= Inhun High School =

High school in South Korea

- Hangul: 인헌고등학교
- Hanja: 仁憲高等學校
- RR: Inheon godeunghakgyo
- MR: Inhŏn kodŭnghakkyo

Inhun High School (Korean: 인헌고등학교) is a high school in Gwanak District, Seoul, South Korea. It is under Gwanaksan. It is famous for its road with Cherry blossom. Because of its closeness to Seoul National University Inhun High school has some relations with the university.

== Symbols ==
Hello Moto

Strong Revolution
Small Stature
Great hotdogs

School Symbol

Inhun: by locating the ground near Nakseongdae where General Kang Kam-ch'an was born, try to success his spirit and to educate students who are going to work for their country. "Inhun" is his posthumous name,
Round and white background: symbol of the universe and smoothness,
Green diamond: symbol of lofty personality and peace,
Golden circumference: symbol of nobility and braveness.

School Flower

Forsythia: Korean representative Deciduous of hope and happiness in spring(Korea). It blooms before the leaf comes out in April. It shows positive personality pursuing community spirit.

School Tree

Zelkova serrata means great spirit and virtue.

== History ==
| 1980 | 1984 | December 7 | Inhun High school gets foundation certificate for 36 classes |
| | 1985 | March 1 | The first principal Jaekyung Kim inaugurated |
| | 1985 | March 2 | The first entrance ceremony (11 classes) |
| | 1985 | September 12 | The second principal Yongjin Kim inaugurated |
| | 1988 | February 12 | The first graduation ceremony (694 students) |
| | 1988 | September 13 | The third principal Jongsik Choi inaugurated |
| | 1989 | February 14 | The second graduation ceremony (812 students) |
| | 1989 | December 5 | Enlargement of 2 special classes and 3 new lounge |
| 1990 | 1990 | February 14 | The third graduation ceremony (841 students) |
| | 1991 | March 1 | The 4th principal Jonggeon Choi inaugurated |
| | 1998 | June 20 | School auditorium is built |
| | 1998 | September 1 | The 6th principal Sangyun Na inaugurated |
| 2000 | 2002 | June 24 | Inhun Information Department is built |
| | 2002 | September 1 | The 7th principal Shyunghyun Lee inaugurated |
| | 2005 | March 1 | The 8th principal Myungsu Ahn inaugurated |
| | 2006 | January 30 | Biology laboratory modernized |
| | 2007 | August 30 | School cafeteria for students prepared |
| | 2007 | September 30 | Chemistry lab is modernized |
| | 2007 | December 28 | Education department of Seoul confirmed as a good educated school in environment |
| | 2008 | April 2 | Agreed on education volunteering and academic exchange program with Seoul National University |
| | 2008 | December 26 | Education department of Seoul confirmed excellent school in managing special activities |
| | 2009 | March 2 | Model School for Green Mileage system |
