= List of Treasures of South Korea (2005–2009) =

The Treasures of South Korea designation was established in 1962 and is managed by the Korea Heritage Service (KHS; formerly "Cultural Heritage Administration"). This designation is distinct from the National Treasure designation. Covered here are items designated in the years 2005 through 2009.

== List ==
| No. (Note: On November 19, 2021, the Cultural Heritage Administration removed the numbering system for all of its designations, including Treasure. Previously assigned numbers are preserved here for the sake of reference.) | Image | Official names (Note: (English, Hangul, Hanja/mixed script)) | Location | Dates | Refs |
|---|---|---|---|---|---|
| 1426 | | Painting of Avalokitesvara Bodhisattva 수월관음도 水月觀音圖 | Yongin, Gyeonggi | 2005-01-22 | |
| 1427 | | Stone Guardians and Pillars in the Tomb of King Wonseong, Gyeongju 경주 원성왕릉 석상 및 석주일괄 慶州 元聖王陵 石像 및 石柱一括 | Gyeongju, North Gyeongsang | 2005-01-22, 2010-12-27 renamed | |
| 1428 | | Buncheong Memorial Tablet with Inlaid Inscription of "the Thirteenth Jeongtong Year" and Buncheong Wares 분청사기 상감‘정통 13년’명 묘지 및 분청사기 일괄 粉靑沙器 象嵌‘正統十三年’銘 墓誌 및 粉靑沙器一括 | Yongsan District, Seoul | 2005-01-22 | |
| 1429 | | East and West Three-story Stone Pagodas at Wonwonsa Temple Site, Gyeongju 경주 원원사지 동·서 삼층석탑 慶州 遠願寺址 東·西 三層石塔 | Gyeongju, North Gyeongsang | 2005-04-07, 2010-12-27 renamed | |
| 1430 | | Folding Screen of Hwaseong haenghaengdo (Royal Parade to Hwaseong Fortress) 화성행행도 병풍 華城行幸圖 屛風 | Yongsan District, Seoul | 2005-04-15 | |
| 1430-2 | | 봉수당진찬도 奉壽堂進饌圖 | Jung District, Seoul | 2015-09-02 | |
| 1431 | | Gyehoedo (Gathering of Officials) Including Jeong Sa-sin 정사신 참석 계회도 일괄 鄭士信 參席 契會圖 一括 | Yongsan District, Seoul | 2005-04-15 | |
| 1432 | | Hanging Painting and Flagpole Supports of Jeokcheonsa Temple 적천사괘불탱및지주 磧川寺掛佛幀및支柱 | Cheongdo County, North Gyeongsang | 2005-04-15 | |
| 1433 | | Five-story Stone Pagoda of Dogapsa Temple, Yeongam 영암 도갑사 오층석탑 靈巖 道岬寺 五層石塔 | Yeongam County, South Jeolla | 2005-06-13, 2010-12-27 renamed | |
| 1434 | | Ordination Platform of Ansimsa Temple, Wanju 완주 안심사 금강계단 完州 安心寺 金剛戒壇 | Wanju County, North Jeolla | 2005-06-13, 2010-12-27 renamed | |
| 1435 | | Portrait of Yi Won-ik 이원익 초상 李元翼 肖像 | Gwangmyeong, Gyeonggi | 2005-07-07 | |
| 1436 | | Stone Standing Buddha in Nongsan-ri, Geochang 거창 농산리 석조여래입상 居昌 農山里 石造如來立像 | Geochang County, South Gyeongsang | 2005-07-07, 2010-08-25 renamed | |
| 1437 | | White Porcelain Moon Jar 백자 달항아리 白磁 壺 | Yongsan District, Seoul | 2005-08-12 | |
| 1438 | | White Porcelain Moon Jar 백자 달항아리 白磁 壺 | Jongno District, Seoul | 2005-08-12 | |
| 1439 | | White Porcelain Moon Jar 백자 달항아리 白磁 壺 | Jongno District, Seoul | 2005-08-12 | |
| ~~1440~~ | | ~~White Porcelain Moon Jar~~; ~~백자대호~~; ~~白磁大壺~~ | ~~Nam District, Busan~~ | 2005-08-12, 2007-12-17 removed, made National Treasure No. 310 | |
| 1441 | | White Porcelain Moon Jar 백자 달항아리 白磁 壺 | Yongin, Gyeonggi | 2005-08-12 | |
| 1442 | | Folding Screen of Irwol bandodo (The Sun, the Moon, and Sacred Peaches) 일월반도도 병풍 日月蟠桃圖 屛風 | Jongno District, Seoul | 2005-08-12 | |
| 1443 | | Folding Screen of Wangseja tangang jinhado (Celebration for the Birth of the Crown Prince) 왕세자탄강진하도 병풍 王世子誕降陳賀圖 屛風 | Jongno District, Seoul | 2005-08-12 | |
| 1444 | | Iron Mace with Silver-inlaid Demon Design 은입사귀면문철퇴 銀入絲鬼面文鐵鎚 | Jongno District, Seoul | 2005-08-12 | |
| 1445 | | Hanging Painting of Yongmunsa Temple, Yecheon (The Vulture Peak Assembly) 예천용문사영산회괘불탱 醴泉龍門寺靈山會掛佛幀 | Yecheon County, North Gyeongsang | 2005-09-06 | |
| 1446 | | Hanging Painting of Yongmunsa Temple, Namhae 남해용문사괘불탱 南海龍門寺掛佛幀 | Namhae County, South Gyeongsang | 2005-09-06 | |
| 524-2 | | Books of the Oksan Branch of the Yeoju Yi Clan 여주이씨 옥산문중 전적 驪州李氏 玉山門中 典籍 | Gyeongju, North Gyeongsang | 2006-07-18 | |
| 1077-2 | | Geunsarok (Reflections on Things at Hand) 근사록 近思錄 | Jongno District, Seoul | 2006-01-17 | |
| 1087-2 | | Sinchan byeogonbang (Prescriptions to Prevent Epidemics) 신찬벽온방 新纂辟瘟方 | Gangseo District, Seoul | 2006-01-17 | |
| 1189-2 | | Portrait of Bak Mun-su 박문수초상 朴文秀 肖像 | Jongno District, Seoul | 2006-12-29 | |
| 1447 | | Celadon Plaque with Inlaid Flower and Bird Design 청자 상감화조문 도판 靑磁 象嵌花鳥文 陶板 | Yongsan District, Seoul | 2006-01-17 | |
| 1448 | | White Porcelain Jar with Floral Medallion and Scroll Design in Underglaze Cobalt Blue 백자 청화보상당초문 항아리 白磁 靑畵寶相唐草文 壺 | Yongsan District, Seoul | 2006-01-17 | |
| 1449 | | Celadon Girin-shaped Water Dropper 청자 기린모양 연적 靑磁 麒麟形 硯滴 | Jongno District, Seoul | 2006-01-17 | |
| 1450 | | Buncheong Memorial Tablet with Inlaid Inscription and Square Flat Bottle with Stamped Design 분청사기 상감사각묘지 및 분청사기 인화문 사각편병 粉靑沙器 象嵌四角墓誌 및 粉靑沙器 印花文 四角扁甁 | Yongin, Gyeonggi | 2006-01-17 | |
| 1451 | | Celadon Bottle-shaped Ewer with Inlaid Cloud, Crane, and Chrysanthemum Design 청자 상감운학국화문 병형 주전자 靑磁 象嵌雲鶴菊花文 甁形 注子 | Gwanak District, Seoul | 2006-01-17 | |
| 1452 | | Celadon Prunus Vase with Inlaid Lotus and Willow Design and Inscription of "Deokcheon" 청자 상감‘덕천’명 연화양류문 매병 靑磁 象嵌'德泉'銘 蓮花楊柳文 梅甁 | Gwanak District, Seoul | 2006-01-17 | |
| 1453 | | Celadon Ewer 청자 주전자 靑磁 注子 | Gwanak District, Seoul | 2006-01-17 | |
| 1454 | | Celadon Octagonal Bottle with Long Neck and Incised Lotus Design 청자 음각연화문 팔각장경병 靑磁 陰刻蓮花文 八角長頸甁 | Gwanak District, Seoul | 2006-01-17 | |
| 1455 | | Buncheong Bottle with Inlaid Wave and Fish Design 분청사기 상감파도어문 병 粉靑沙器 象嵌波濤魚文 甁 | Gwanak District, Seoul | 2006-01-17 | |
| 1456 | | Buncheong Flat Bottle with Sgraffito Taegeuk Design 분청사기 박지태극문 편병 粉靑沙器 剝地太極文 扁甁 | Gwanak District, Seoul | 2006-01-17 | |
| 1457 | | White Porcelain Ritual Vessel in the Shape of a Square Bowl 백자 사각발형 제기 白磁 四角鉢形 祭器 | Gwanak District, Seoul | 2006-01-17 | |
| 1458 | | White Porcelain Octagonal Water Dropper with Butterfly Design and Inscription of a Poem in Underglaze Cobalt Blue and Iron 백자 청화철화‘시’명나비문 팔각연적 白磁 靑畵鐵畵‘詩’銘蝶文 八角硯滴 | Gwanak District, Seoul | 2006-01-17 | |
| 1459 | | Haedong Jogye Bogamhwasang japjeo (Miscellaneous Writings of Buddhist Monk Bogam) 해동조계복암화상잡저 海東曹溪宓庵和尙雜著 | Jongno District, Seoul | 2006-01-17 | |
| 1460 | | Bronze Bell with Inscription of "Heungcheonsa Temple" 흥천사명 동종 興天寺銘 銅鍾 | Jung District, Seoul | 2006-01-17 | |
| 1461 | | Jogyemun Gate of Beomeosa Temple, Busan 부산 범어사 조계문 釜山 梵魚寺 曹溪門 | Geumjeong District, Busan | 2006-02-07 | |
| 1462 | | Stele for the Private Residence Site of King Injo, Seoul 서울 인조별서 유기비 서울 仁祖別墅 遺基碑 | Eunpyeong District, Seoul | 2006-02-17, 2010-12-27 renamed | |
| 1463-1 | | ko 용비어천가 권8, 9, 10 龍飛御天歌 卷八, 九, 十 | Dalseo District, Daegu | 2006-04-28 | |
| 1463-2 | | Yongbieocheonga (Song of Dragons Flying in Heaven), Volumes 3 and 4 용비어천가 권3, 4 龍飛御天歌 卷三, 四 | Jongno District, Seoul | 2009-02-23 | |
| 1463-3 | | Yongbieocheonga (Song of Dragons Flying in Heaven), Volumes 1 and 2 용비어천가 권1~2 龍飛御天歌 卷一~二 | Gwanak District, Seoul | 2009-10-20 | |
| 1463-4 | | Yongbieocheonga (Song of Dragons Flying in Heaven), Volumes 1, 2, 7, and 8 용비어천가 권1~2, 7~8 龍飛御天歌 卷一~二, 七~八 | Seongbuk District, Seoul | 2009-10-20 | |
| 1464 | | Sama bangmok (Roster of Successful Licentiate Examination Candidates) 사마방목 司馬榜目 | Dalseo District, Daegu | 2006-04-28 | |
| 1465 | | Doeun seonsaengjip (Collected Works of Yi Sung-in) 도은선생집 陶隱先生集 | Dalseo District, Daegu | 2006-04-28 | |
| 1466 | | Jinil yugo (Posthumous Works of Seong Gan) 진일유고 眞逸遺稿 | Dalseo District, Daegu | 2006-04-28 | |
| 1467 | | Clay Four Guardian Kings of Songgwangsa Temple, Suncheon 순천송광사소조사천왕상 順天松廣寺塑造四天王像 | Suncheon, South Jeolla | 2006-04-28 | |
| 1468 | | Excavated Relics from the Clay Four Guardian Kings of Songgwangsa Temple, Suncheon 순천 송광사 소조 사천왕상 복장유물 順天 松廣寺 塑造 四天王像 腹藏遺物 | Suncheon, South Jeolla | 2006-04-28 | |
| 1469 | | Certificate of Meritorious Subject Issued to Ma Cheon-mok 마천목좌명공신녹권 馬天牧佐命功臣錄券 | Jongno District, Seoul | 2006-04-28 | |
| 1470 | | Excavated Documents of Bulgapsa Temple, Yeonggwang 영광 불갑사 불복장 전적 靈光 佛甲寺 佛腹藏 典籍 | Yeonggwang County, South Jeolla | 2006-04-28 | |
| 1471 | | Three-story Stone Pagoda of Tongdosa Temple, Yangsan 양산 통도사 삼층석탑 梁山 通度寺 三層石塔 | Yangsan, South Gyeongsang | 2006-06-01, 2010-12-27 renamed | |
| 1472 | | Buddhist Painting of Tongdosa Temple (Amitabha Buddha) 통도사 아미타여래설법도 通度寺 阿彌陀如來說法圖 | Yangsan, South Gyeongsang | 2006-07-18 | |
| 1473 | | Documents of the Oksan Branch of the Yeoju Yi Clan 여주이씨 옥산문중 고문서 驪州李氏 玉山門中 古文書 | Gyeongju, North Gyeongsang | 2006-07-18 | |
| 1474-1 | | Documents of the Yangwol Branch of the Gyeongju Yi Clan 경주이씨 양월문중 고문서 및 향안 慶州李氏 楊月門中 古文書 및 鄕案 | Gyeongju, North Gyeongsang | 2006-07-18 | |
| 1474-2 | | Documents of the Yangwol Branch of the Gyeongju Yi Clan 경주이씨 양월문중 고문서 및 향안 - 이지대 왕지 慶州李氏 楊月門中 古文書 및 鄕案 - 李之帶 王旨 | Jongno District, Seoul | 2006-07-18 | |
| 1475 | | Gilt-bronze Buddha Plaques Excavated from Anapji Pond 안압지 출토 금동판 불상 일괄 雁鴨池 出土 金銅板 佛像 一括 | Gyeongju, North Gyeongsang | 2006-09-01 | |
| 1476 | | Royal Certificate of Meritorious Subject Issued to Kim Si-min 김시민 선무공신 교서 金時敏 宣武功臣 敎書 | Jinju, South Gyeongsang | 2006-12-29 | |
| 1477-1 | | Portraits of Chae Je-gong 채제공 초상 일괄-시복본 蔡濟恭 肖像 一括-時服本 | Suwon, Gyeonggi | 2006-12-29 | |
| 1477-2 | | Portraits of Chae Je-gong 채제공 초상 일괄-금관조복본 蔡濟恭 肖像 一括-金冠朝服本 | Dong District, Daejeon | 2006-12-29 | |
| 1477-3 | | Portraits of Chae Je-gong 채제공 초상 일괄-흑단령포본 蔡濟恭 肖像 一括-黑團領袍本 | South Chungcheong | 2006-12-29 | |
| 1478 | | Portrait of Three Jo Brothers 조씨삼형제 초상 趙氏三兄弟 肖像 | Jongno District, Seoul | 2006-12-29 | |
| 1479 | | Portrait of Yu Suk and Related Documents 유숙 초상 및 관련 교지 柳潚 肖像 및 關聯 敎旨 | Jongno District, Seoul | 2006-12-29 | |
| 1480 | | Portrait of Sim Hwan-ji 심환지 초상 沈煥之 肖像 | Yongin, Gyeonggi | 2006-12-29 | |
| 1481 | | Portrait of Kim Yu 김유 초상 金楺 肖像 | Yongin, Gyeonggi | 2006-12-29 | |
| 1482 | | Portrait of Yi Si-bang 이시방 초상 李時昉 肖像 | Yuseong District, Daejeon | 2006-12-29 | |
| 1483 | | Portrait of Yi Chae 이채 초상 李采 肖像 | Yongsan District, Seoul | 2006-12-29 | |
| 1484 | | Portrait of Nam Gu-man 남구만 초상 南九萬 肖像 | Yongsan District, Seoul | 2006-12-29 | |
| 1485 | | Portrait of Kang I-o 강이오 초상 姜彛五 肖像 | Yongsan District, Seoul | 2006-12-29 | |
| 1486 | | Portrait of Yi Gwang-sa 이광사 초상 李匡師 肖像 | Yongsan District, Seoul | 2006-12-29 | |
| 1487 | | Portrait of Seo Jik-su 서직수 초상 徐直修 肖像 | Yongsan District, Seoul | 2006-12-29 | |
| 1488 | | Portrait of Sim Deuk-gyeong 심득경 초상 沈得經 肖像 | Buk District, Gwangju | 2006-12-29 | |
| 1489 | | Portrait of Bak Yu-myeong 박유명초상 朴惟明 肖像 | Suwon, Gyeonggi | 2006-12-29 | |
| 1490 | | Portrait of Yi Seong-yun 이성윤 초상 李誠胤 肖像 | Jongno District, Seoul | 2006-12-29 | |
| 1491 | | Portrait of Prince Yeoning 연잉군 초상 延礽君 肖像 | Jongno District, Seoul | 2006-12-29 | |
| 1492 | | Portrait of King Cheoljong 철종 어진 哲宗御眞 | Jongno District, Seoul | 2006-12-29 | |
| 1493 | | Portrait of O Jae-sun 오재순 초상 吳載純 肖像 | Yongsan District, Seoul | 2006-12-29 | |
| 1494 | | Portrait and Photography of Hwang Hyeon 황현 초상 및 사진 黃玹 肖像 및 寫眞 | Suncheon, South Jeolla | 2006-12-29 | |
| 1495 | | Portraits of Yun Jeung 윤증 초상 일괄 尹拯 肖像 一括 | Gongju, South Chungcheong | 2006-12-29 | |
| 1496 | | Portrait of Yun Geup 윤급 초상 尹汲 肖像 | Yongsan District, Seoul | 2006-12-29 | |
| 1497 | | Portrait of Kim Si-seup 김시습 초상 金時習 肖像 | Jongno District, Seoul | 2006-12-29 | |
| 1498 | | Portrait of a Literatus of the Late Joseon Dynasty 조선후기 문인초상 朝鮮後期 文人 肖像 | Nam District, Busan | 2006-12-29 | |
| 1499-1 | | Portraits of Yi Ha-eung 이하응 초상 일괄 - 흑단령포본, 금관조복본, 와룡관학창의본, 흑건청포본, 복건심의본 李昰應 肖像 一括 | Jongno District, Seoul | 2006-12-29 | |
| 1499-2 | | 이하응 초상 일괄 - 금관조복본 李昰應 肖像 一括 - 金冠朝服本)] (Portraits of Yi Ha-eung | Yongsan District, Seoul | 2006-12-29 | |
| 1500 | | Portrait of Kim I-an 김이안초상 金履安 肖像 | Seodaemun District, Seoul | 2006-12-29 | |
| 1501 | | Portrait of Yi Deok-seong and Related Relics 이덕성 초상 및 관련자료 일괄 李德成 肖像 및 關聯資料 一括 | Nam District, Busan | 2006-12-29 | |
| 1502 | | Portrait of Yun Hyo-jeon (Presumed) 전 윤효전 초상 傳 尹孝全 肖像 | Jung District, Daegu | 2006-12-29 | |
| 1503 | | Portrait of Im Jang 임장 초상 任章 肖像 | Seodaemun District, Seoul | 2006-12-29 | |
| 1504 | | Portrait of Yu Eon-ho 유언호 초상 兪彦鎬 肖像 | Gwanak District, Seoul | 2006-12-29 | |
| 1505 | | Portrait of Buddhist Monk Yujeong in Donghwasa Temple, Daegu 대구 동화사 사명당 유정 진영 大邱 桐華寺 泗溟堂 惟政 眞影 | Dong District, Daegu | 2006-12-29 | |
| 1506 | | Portrait of State Preceptor Seongak in Seonamsa Temple, Suncheon 순천 선암사 선각국사 도선 진영 順天 仙巖寺 先覺國師 道詵 眞影 | Suncheon, South Jeolla | 2006-12-29 | |
| 1507 | | Wooden Seated Amitabha Buddha and Excavated Relics of Jaunsa Temple, Gwangju 광주 자운사 목조아미타여래좌상 및 복장유물 光州 紫雲寺 木造阿彌陀如來坐像 및 腹藏遺物 | Dong District, Gwangju | 2006-12-29 | |
| 1508 | | Royal Certificate of Meritorious Subject Issued to Yi Seong-yun and Related Relics 이성윤 위성공신교서 및 관련유물 李誠胤 衛聖功臣敎書 및 關聯遺物 | Bupyeong District, Incheon | 2006-12-29 | |
| 569-26 | | Calligraphy by An Jung-geun 안중근의사유묵 - 임적선진위장의무 安重根義士遺墨 - 臨敵先進 爲將義務 | Changwon, South Gyeongsang | 2007-10-24 | |
| 894-2 | | Annotated Brahmajala Sutra (The Sutra of Brahma's Net) 주범망경 注梵網經 | Geumjeong District, Busan | 2007-09-18 | |
| 1224-2 | | Buljo samgyeong (The Three Sutras) 불조삼경 佛祖三經 | Geumjeong District, Busan | 2007-09-18 | |
| 1509 | | Portrait of Heo Mok 허목초상 許穆 肖像 | Chuncheon, Gangwon | 2007-02-27 | |
| 1510 | | Portrait of Choe Ik-hyeon 최익현초상 崔益鉉 肖像 | Jeju City, Jeju | 2007-02-27 | |
| 1511 | | Gukjo jeongtorok (Records of Wars in the Early Joseon Period) 국조정토록 國朝征討錄 | Seongnam, Gyeonggi | 2007-04-20 | |
| 1512 | | Isip gongsin hoemaengchuk (Scroll of Oath-taking Rites by 20 Meritorious Subjects); 20공신회맹축 - 영국공신녹훈후 二十功臣會盟軸 - 寧國功臣錄勳後 | Seongnam, Gyeonggi | 2007-04-20 | |
| 1513 | | Isip gongsin hoemaengchuk (Scroll of Oath-taking Rites by 20 Meritorious Subjects); 20공신회맹축 - 보사공신녹훈후 二十功臣會盟軸 - 保社功臣錄勳後 | Seongnam, Gyeonggi | 2007-04-20 | |
| 1514 | | Mahavaipulya purnabudha Sutra (The Complete Enlightenment Sutra), Part 1-1 of Volume 1 대방광원각수다라요의경 권상1의1 大方廣圓覺修多羅了義經 卷上 一之一 | Seongnam, Gyeonggi | 2007-04-20 | |
| 1515 | | Shurangama Sutra (The Sutra of the Heroic One), Korean Translation, Volumes 2 and 10 대불정여래밀인수증요의제보살만행수능엄경 권2, 10 大佛頂如來密因修證了義諸菩薩萬行首楞嚴經 卷二, 十 | Seongnam, Gyeonggi | 2007-04-20 | |
| 1516 | | Clay Seated Vairocana Buddha Triad of Gwisinsa Temple, Gimje 김제 귀신사 소조비로자나삼불좌상 金堤 歸信寺 塑造毘盧遮那三佛坐像 | Gimje, North Jeolla | 2007-04-20 | |
| 1517 | | Dry-lacquered Seated Amitabha Buddha and Excavated Relics of Seonguksa Temple, Namwon 남원 선국사 건칠아미타여래좌상 및 복장유물 南原 善國寺 乾漆阿彌陀如來坐像 및 腹藏遺物 | Namwon, North Jeolla | 2007-07-13 | |
| 1518 | | Mahavaipulya purnabudha Sutra (The Complete Enlightenment Sutra), Volume 1 대방광원각수다라요의경 권1 大方廣圓覺脩多羅了義經 卷1 | Jongno District, Seoul | 2007-07-13 | |
| 1518-2 | | Saddharmapundarika Samadhi (Meditation on the Lotus Stura) 대방광원각수다라요의경 大方廣圓覺脩多羅了義經 | Ulju County, Ulsan | 2015-04-22 | |
| 1519 | | Shurangama Sutra (The Sutra of the Heroic One), Volume 1 묘법연화경삼매참법 권상 妙法蓮華經三昧懺法 卷上 | Yuseong District, Daejeon | 2007-07-13 | |
| 1520 | | 대불정여래밀인수증요의제보살만행수능엄경 권1; Shurangama Sutra (The Sutra of the Heroic One), Volume 1 | Jongno District, Seoul | 2007-07-13 | |
| 1521 | | [[大佛頂如來密因修證了義諸菩薩萬行首楞嚴經 卷1) (Gyeongguk daejeon (National Code), Volume 3]] 경국대전 권3 經國大典 卷三 | Jongno District, Seoul | 2007-07-13 | |
| 1522 | | Painting of the Vulture Peak Assembly 영산회상도 靈山會上圖 | Seo District, Busan | 2007-07-13 | |
| 1523 | | Stone Basin of Bulguksa Temple, Gyeongju 경주 불국사 석조 慶州 佛國寺 石槽 | Gyeongju, North Gyeongsang | 2007-09-11, 2010-12-27 renamed | |
| 1524 | | Epitaph of Yi Yun-tak Written in Hangeul (Korean Alphabet), Seoul 서울 이윤탁 한글영비 서울 李允濯 한글靈碑 | Nowon District, Seoul | 2007-09-18, 2010-12-27 renamed | |
| 1525 | | Geumjang yojipgyeong (Collection of the Essentials of Sutras), Volumes 1 and 2 금장요집경 권1~2 金藏要集經 卷一~二 | Geumjeong District, Busan | 2007-09-18 | |
| 1526 | | Wooden Seated Sakyamuni Buddha Triad of Beomeosa Temple, Busan 부산 범어사 목조석가여래삼존좌상 釜山 梵魚寺 木造釋迦如來三尊坐像 | Geumjeong District, Busan | 2007-09-18 | |
| 1527 | | Iron Seated Buddha at Baegunam Hermitage, Chungju 충주백운암철조여래좌상 忠州白雲庵鐵造如來坐像 | Chungju, North Chungcheong | 2007-10-24 | |
| 1528 | | Sadugan Jiniltaeja isippalsugyeong, the First Tripitaka Koreana Edition 초조본사두간진일태자이십팔수경 初雕本 舍頭諫晉日太子二十八宿經 | Seodaemun District, Seoul | 2007-10-24 | |
| 1529 | | Abhidharma sara prakirnaka Sastra (Heart of Scholasticism), the First Tripitaka Koreana Edition, Volume 9 초조본 잡아비담심론 권9 初雕本 雜我毘曇心論 卷九 | Seodaemun District, Seoul | 2007-10-24 | |
| 1530 | | Suyong samsu yohaengbeop (Essential Actions for the Use of Water), the First Tripitaka Koreana Edition 초조본수용삼수요행법 初雕本 受用三水要行法 | Seodaemun District, Seoul | 2007-10-24 | |
| 1531 | | Folding Screen of Giroyeondo and Sujagyeondo (Gathering of Elders and Celebration for Granting Titles of Nobility Under King Yeongjo) 영조 기로연·수작연도 병풍 英祖 耆老宴·受爵宴圖 屛風 | Jongno District, Seoul | 2007-10-24 | |
| 1532 | | Tomb Keeper's House at Nyeongneung Royal Tomb, Yeoju 여주 효종 영릉재실 驪州 孝宗 寧陵齋室 | Yeoju County, Gyeonggi | 2007-11-29 | |
| 1533 | | Haedong paldo bonghwa sanak jido (Map of Beacon Mounds in the Eight Provinces of Korea) 해동팔도봉화산악지도 海東八道烽火山岳地圖 | Seongbuk District, Seoul | 2007-12-31 | |
| 1534 | | Seogwoldoan (Plan of the Western Palace) 서궐도안 西闕圖案 | Seongbuk District, Seoul | 2007-12-31 | |
| 1535 | | Soryeongwondo (Tomb of the Royal Lady Choe) 숙빈최씨 소령원도 淑嬪崔氏 昭寧園圖 | Seongnam, Gyeonggi | 2007-12-31 | |
| 1536 | | Woljungdo (Scenes of Yeongwol) 월중도 越中圖 | Seongnam, Gyeonggi | 2007-12-31 | |
| 1537-1 | | Seobuk pia yanggye malli illam jido (Comprehensive Map for Defense of West and North Border) 서북피아양계만리일람지도 西北彼我兩界萬里一覽之圖 | Seocho District, Seoul | 2007-12-31 | |
| 1537-2 | | Seobuk pia yanggye malli illam jido (Comprehensive Map for Defense of West and North Border) 서북피아양계만리일람지도 西北彼我兩界萬里一覽之圖 | Gwanak District, Seoul | 2008-12-22 | |
| 1538 | | Dongguk daejido (Great Map of the Eastern State) 동국대지도 東國大地圖 | Yongsan District, Seoul | 2007-12-31 | |
| 1539 | | Bongnae yumuk (Calligraphy by Yang Sa-eon) 봉래유묵 蓬萊遺墨 | Seodaemun District, Seoul | 2007-12-31 | |
| 1540 | | Celadon Gourd-shaped Ewer 청자 표주박모양 주전자 靑磁 瓢形 注子 | Gwanak District, Seoul | 2007-12-31 | |
| 1541 | | Buncheong Bottle with Inlaid Peony and Willow Design 분청사기 상감모란양류문 병 粉靑沙器 象嵌牡丹楊柳文 甁 | Gwanak District, Seoul | 2007-12-31 | |
| 850-3 | | Daedong yeojido (Map of the Great East) 대동여지도 신유본 大東輿地圖 | Gwanak District, Seoul | 2008-12-22 | |
| 1147-2 | | Saddharmapundarika Sutra (The Lotus Sutra), Volumes 1 and 2 묘법연화경 권1~2 妙法蓮華經 卷一~二 | Yesan County, South Chungcheong | 2008-03-12 | |
| 1219-2 | | Mahavaipulya purnabudha Sutra (The Complete Enlightenment Sutra), Part 2-2 of Volume 2 and Part 3-1 to 3-2 of Volume 2 대방광원각수다라요의경 권상2의2, 권하3의1~3의2 大方廣圓覺脩多羅了義經 卷上二之二, 卷下三之一~三之二 | Jongno District, Seoul | 2008-06-27 | |
| 1358-2 | | Dongyeodo (Atlas of the Eastern State) 동여도 東輿圖 | Gwanak District, Seoul | 2008-12-22 | |
| 1542 | | Yogye gwanbang jido (Borderland Map of Liaodong and Beijing) 요계관방지도 遼薊關防地圖 | Gwanak District, Seoul | 2008-03-12 | |
| 1543-1 | | Jabi doryang chambeop (Repentance Ritual of the Great Compassion), Revised Version, Volumes 9 and 10 상교정본자비도량참법 권9~10 詳校正本慈悲道場懺法 卷九~十 | Yesan County, South Chungcheong | 2008-03-12, 2019-01-03 renumbered | |
| 1543-2 | | Jabi doryang chambeop (Repentance Ritual of the Great Compassion), Revised Version, Volumes 5 상교정본자비도량참법 권5 詳校正本慈悲道場懺法卷五 | Bucheon, Gyeonggi | 2019-01-03 | |
| 1544 | | Dry-lacquered Seated Amitabha Buddha of Simhyangsa Temple, Naju 나주 심향사 건칠아미타여래좌상 羅州 尋香寺 乾漆 阿彌陀如來坐像 | Naju, South Jeolla | 2008-03-12 | |
| 1545 | | Dry-lacquered Seated Vairocana Buddha of Bulhoesa Temple, Naju 나주불회사건칠비로자나불좌상 羅州 佛會寺 乾漆 毘盧遮那佛坐像 | Naju, South Jeolla | 2008-03-12 | |
| 1546 | | Portable Shrine of Gilt-bronze Buddhas at Cheoneunsa Temple, Gurye 구례 천은사 금동불감 求禮 泉隱寺 金銅佛龕 | Gurye County, South Jeolla | 2008-03-12 | |
| 1547 | | Gilt-bronze Seated Avalokitesvara Bodhisattva of Daeheungsa Temple, Haenam 해남 대흥사 금동관음보살좌상 海南 大興寺 金銅觀音菩薩坐像 | Haenam County, South Jeolla | 2008-03-12 | |
| ~~1548~~ | | ~~Wooden Seated Vairocana Buddha Triad of Hwaeomsa Temple, Gurye~~; ~~구례화엄사목조비로자나삼신불좌상~~; ~~求禮 華嚴寺 木造毘盧遮那三身佛坐像~~ | ~~Gurye County, South Jeolla~~ | 2008-03-12; 2021-06-23 removed and made National Treasure No. 336 | |
| 1549 | | Wooden Sakyamuni Buddha Triad and Clay Sixteen Arhats of Songgwangsa Temple, Suncheon 순천 송광사 목조석가여래삼존상 및 소조16나한상 일괄 順天 松廣寺 木造釋迦如來三尊像 및 塑造十六羅漢像 一括 | Suncheon, South Jeolla | 2008-03-12 | |
| 1550 | | Wooden Sakyamuni Buddha Triad of Heungguksa Temple, Yeosu 여수 흥국사 목조석가여래삼존상 麗水 興國寺 木造釋迦如來三尊像 | Yeosu, South Jeolla | 2008-03-12 | |
| 1551 | | Hanging Painting of Yeongsusa Temple, Jincheon (The Vulture Peak Assembly) 진천 영수사 영산회괘불탱 鎭川 靈水寺 靈山會掛佛幀 | Jincheon County, North Chungcheong | 2008-03-12 | |
| 1552 | | Hanging Painting of Daeheungsa Temple, Haenam (The Vulture Peak Assembly) 해남 대흥사 영산회괘불탱 海南 大興寺 靈山會掛佛幀 | Haenam County, South Jeolla | 2008-03-12 | |
| 1553 | | Buddhist Painting of Seonamsa Temple, Suncheon (The King of Sweet Dew) 순천 선암사 서부도암감로왕도 順天 仙巖寺 西浮屠庵 甘露王圖 | Suncheon, South Jeolla | 2008-03-12 | |
| 1554 | | Buddhist Painting of Seonamsa Temple, Suncheon (Thirty Three Patriarchs) 순천 선암사 33조사도 順天 仙巖寺 三十三祖師圖 | Suncheon, South Jeolla | 2008-03-12 | |
| 1555 | | Bronze Bell of Yongheungsa Temple, Damyang 담양 용흥사동종 潭陽 龍興寺 銅鍾 | Damyang County, South Jeolla | 2008-03-12 | |
| 1556 | | Bronze Bell of Heungguksa Temple, Yeosu 여수 흥국사 동종 麗水 興國寺 銅鍾 | Yeosu, South Jeolla | 2008-03-12 | |
| 1557 | | Bronze Bell of Neunggasa Temple, Goheung 고흥 능가사 동종 高興 楞伽寺 銅鍾 | Goheung County, South Jeolla | 2008-03-12 | |
| 1558 | | Bronze Bell of Seonamsa Temple, Suncheon 순천 선암사 동종 順天 仙巖寺 銅鍾 | Suncheon, South Jeolla | 2008-03-12 | |
| 1559 | | Transcription of Avatamsaka Sutra (The Flower Garland Sutra) in Silver on Indigo Paper 감지은니대방광불화엄경 紺紙銀泥大方廣佛華嚴經 | Yongsan District, Seoul | 2008-04-22 | |
| 1560 | | Doseongdo (Map of the Capital) 도성도 都城圖 | Gwanak District, Seoul | 2008-04-22 | |
| 1561 | | Bronze Bell of Seonamsa Temple, Suncheon 순천 선암사 동종 順天 仙巖寺 銅鍾 | Suncheon, South Jeolla | 2008-04-22 | |
| 1562 | | Hanging Painting of Buseoksa Temple, Yeongju (Five Buddhas) 영주 부석사 오불회 괘불탱 榮州 浮石寺 五佛會 掛佛幀 | Yeongju, North Gyeongsang | 2008-04-22 | |
| 1563 | | Daeungjeon Hall of Donghwasa Temple, Daegu 대구 동화사 대웅전 大邱 桐華寺 大雄殿 | Dong District, Daegu | 2008-04-28 | |
| 1564-1 | | Royal Certificate of Meritorious Subject Issued to Yi Sun-sin 이순신 선무공신교서 李蕣臣 宣武功臣敎書 | Asan, South Chungcheong | 2008-06-27 | |
| 1564-2 | | Documents Related to Yi Sun-sin 이순신 등 선유호상교서 李舜臣 等 宣諭犒賞敎書 | Asan, South Chungcheong | 2011-04-27 | |
| 1564-3 | | Documents Related to Yi Sun-sin 이순신 사명훈유교서 李舜臣 使命訓諭敎書 | Asan, South Chungcheong | 2011-04-27 | |
| 1564-4 | | Documents Related to Yi Sun-sin 이순신 유서 李舜臣 諭書 | Asan, South Chungcheong | 2011-04-27 | |
| 1564-5 | | Documents Related to Yi Sun-sin 이순신 유서 李舜臣 諭書 | Asan, South Chungcheong | 2011-04-27 | |
| 1564-6 | | Documents Related to Yi Sun-sin 이순신 유서 李舜臣 諭書 | Asan, South Chungcheong | 2011-04-27 | |
| 1564-7 | | Documents Related to Yi Sun-sin 이순신 무과홍패 李舜臣 武科紅牌 | Asan, South Chungcheong | 2011-04-27 | |
| 1564-8 | | Documents Related to Yi Sun-sin 이순신처 방씨 고신교지 李舜臣妻 方氏 告身敎旨 | Asan, South Chungcheong | 2011-04-27 | |
| 1564-9 | | Documents Related to Yi Sun-sin 이순신처 방씨 고신교지 李舜臣妻 方氏 告身敎旨 | Asan, South Chungcheong | 2011-04-27 | |
| 1564-10 | | Documents Related to Yi Sun-sin 이순신 증직교지 李舜臣 贈職敎旨 | Asan, South Chungcheong | 2011-04-27 | |
| 1564-11 | | Documents Related to Yi Sun-sin 이순신 사패교지 李舜臣 賜牌敎旨 | Asan, South Chungcheong | 2011-04-27 | |
| 1564-12 | | Documents Related to Yi Sun-sin 이순신 증시교지 李舜臣 贈諡敎旨 | Asan, South Chungcheong | 2011-04-27 | |
| 1564-13 | | Documents Related to Yi Sun-sin 이순신 유지 李舜臣 有旨 | Asan, South Chungcheong | 2011-04-27 | |
| 1564-14 | | Documents Related to Yi Sun-sin 이순신 별급문기 李舜臣 別給文記 | Asan, South Chungcheong | 2011-04-27 | |
| 1564-15 | | Documents Related to Yi Sun-sin 사패교지 賜牌敎旨 | Asan, South Chungcheong | 2012-02-22 | |
| 1564-16 | | Documents Related to Yi Sun-sin 증직교지 贈職敎旨 | Asan, South Chungcheong | 2012-02-22 | |
| 1565 | | Clay Seated Amitabha Buddha Triad of Muryangsa Temple, Buyeo 부여 무량사 소조아미타여래삼존좌상 扶餘無量寺塑造阿彌陀如來三尊坐像 | Buyeo County, South Chungcheong | 2008-06-27 | |
| 1566 | | Wooden Ksitigarbha Bodhisattva Triad and Ten Underworld Kings and Excavated Relics of Heungguksa Temple, Yeosu 여수 흥국사 목조지장보살삼존상·시왕상 일괄 및 복장유물 麗水 興國寺 木造地藏菩薩三尊像·十王像 一括 및 腹藏遺物 | Yeosu, South Jeolla | 2008-06-27 | |
| 1567 | | Ksitigarbha pranidhana Sutra (Great Vows of Ksitigarbha Bodhisattva) 지장보살본원경 地藏菩薩本願經 | Jongno District, Seoul | 2008-06-27 | |
| 1568 | | Yangjindang House, Sangju 상주 양진당 尙州 養眞堂 | Sangju, North Gyeongsang | 2008-07-10 | |
| 1569 | | Eungdodang Lecture Hall of Donamseowon Confucian Academy, Nonsan 논산 돈암서원 응도당 論山 遯岩書院 凝道堂 | Nonsan, South Chungcheong | 2008-07-10 | |
| 1570 | | Bogwangjeon Hall of Daejeonsa Temple, Cheongsong 청송 대전사 보광전 靑松 大典寺 普光殿 | Cheongsong County, North Gyeongsang | 2008-07-28 | |
| 1571 | | Wooden Seated Avalokitesvara Bodhisattva and Excavated Relics of Bogwangsa Temple, Andong 안동 보광사 목조관음보살좌상 및 복장유물 安東 普光寺 木造觀音菩薩坐像 및 腹藏遺物 | Andong, North Gyeongsang | 2008-08-28 | |
| 1572 | | Excavated Relics from the Gilt-bronze Seated Buddha of Munsusa Temple, Seosan 서산 문수사 금동여래좌상 복장유물 瑞山 文殊寺 金銅如來坐像 腹藏遺物 | Yesan County, South Chungcheong | 2008-08-28 | |
| 1573 | | Celadon Dish with Lotus Design in Relief 청자 양각연판문 접시 靑磁 陽刻蓮瓣文 楪匙 | Icheon, Gyeonggi | 2008-08-28 | |
| 1574 | | Geungnakjeon Hall of Bongamsa Temple, Mungyeong 문경 봉암사 극락전 聞慶 鳳巖寺 極樂殿 | Mungyeong, North Gyeongsang | 2008-09-03 | |
| 1575 | | Daeseongjeon Shrine and Myeongnyundang Lecture Hall of Seongjuhyanggyo Local Confucian School 성주향교 대성전 및 명륜당 星州鄕校 大成殿 및 明倫堂 | Seongju County, North Gyeongsang | 2008-09-03 | |
| 1576 | | Daeungjeon Hall of Jikjisa Temple, Gimcheon 김천 직지사 대웅전 金泉 直指寺 大雄殿 | Gimcheon, North Gyeongsang | 2008-09-03 | |
| 1577 | | Jeunggeup yubang (Collection of Prescriptions for Emergency Treatment) 증급유방 拯急遺方 | Yongin, Gyeonggi | 2008-10-17 | |
| 1578 | | Main Hall of Gyeonggijeon Shrine, Jeonju 전주 경기전 정전 全州 慶基殿 正殿 | Jeonju, North Jeolla | 2008-12-01 | |
| 1579 | | Seongjise daranigyeong, the First Tripitaka Koreana Edition 초조본성지세다라니경 初雕本聖持世陀羅 尼經 | Yongin, Gyeonggi | 2008-12-22 | |
| 1580 | | Wooden Seated Amitabha Buddha and Excavated Relics of Suguksa Temple, Seoul 서울 수국사 목조아미타여래좌상 및 복장유물 서울 守國寺 木造阿彌陀如來坐像 및 腹藏遺物 | Eunpyeong District, Seoul | 2008-12-22 | |
| 1581 | | Printing Woodblocks of Daedong yeojido (Map of the Great East) 대동여지도목판 大東輿地圖木板 | Yongsan District, Seoul | 2008-12-22 | |
| 1582 | | Cheonggugwan haebang chongdo (Comprehensive Map of Land and Sea Borders of Korea) 청구관해방총도 靑丘關海方摠圖 | Yongsan District, Seoul | 2008-12-22 | |
| 1583 | | Hamgyeong-do jeondo (Atlas of Hamgyeong-do) 함경도전도 咸鏡道全圖 | Gwanak District, Seoul | 2008-12-22 | |
| 1584 | | Haeseo jido (Atlas of Hwanghae-do) 해서지도 海西地圖 | Gwanak District, Seoul | 2008-12-22 | |
| 1585 | | Yeongnam jido (Atlas of Gyeonsang-do) 영남지도 嶺南地圖 | Gwanak District, Seoul | 2008-12-22 | |
| 1586 | | Jeonju jido (Map of Jeonju) 전주지도 全州地圖 | Gwanak District, Seoul | 2008-12-22 | |
| 1587 | | Joseon jido (Atlas of Korea) 조선지도 朝鮮地圖 | Gwanak District, Seoul | 2008-12-22 | |
| 1588 | | Honam jido (Atlas of Jeolla-do) 호남지도 湖南地圖 | Gwanak District, Seoul | 2008-12-22 | |
| 1589 | | Hoseo jido (Atlas of Chungcheong-do) 호서지도 湖西地圖 | Gwanak District, Seoul | 2008-12-22 | |
| 1590 | | Hwadong gojido (Old Map of China and Korea) 화동고지도 華東古地圖 | Gwanak District, Seoul | 2008-12-22 | |
| 1591 | | Haedong jido (Atlas of Korea) 해동지도 海東地圖 | Gwanak District, Seoul | 2008-12-22 | |
| 1592 | | Yeojido (Atlas of Korea) 여지도 輿地圖 | Gwanak District, Seoul | 2008-12-22 | |
| 1593 | | Haedong yeojido (Atlas of Korea) 해동여지도 海東輿地圖 | Seocho District, Seoul | 2008-12-22 | |
| 1594-1 | | Cheonggudo (Map of Korea) 청구도 靑邱圖 | Seocho District, Seoul | 2008-12-22 | |
| 1594-2 | | Cheonggudo (Map of Korea) 청구도 靑邱圖 | Gyeongsan, North Gyeongsang | 2008-12-22 | |
| 1594-3 | | Cheonggudo (Map of Korea) 청구도 靑邱圖 | Seongbuk District, Seoul | 2009-04-22 | |
| 1595-1 | 진헌마정색도 | Mokjang jido (Maps of Ranches) 목장지도 牧場地圖 | Seocho District, Seoul | 2008-12-22 | |
| 1595-2 | | Mokjang jido (Maps of Ranches) 목장지도 牧場地圖 | Geumjeong District, Busan | 2008-12-22 | |
| 1596 | | Dongyeo bigo (Reference Atlas of Korea) 동여비고 東輿備攷 | Yangsan, South Gyeongsang | 2008-12-22 | |
| 1597 | | Aguk yeojido (Map of the Russia-Korea Borderland) 아국여지도 俄國輿地圖 | Seongnam, Gyeonggi | 2008-12-22 | |
| 1598 | | Hamgyeong-do, Gyeonggi-do, Gangwon-do jido (Maps of Hamgyeong-do, Gyeonggi-do, and Gangwon-do) 함경도·경기도·강원도 지도 咸鏡道·京畿道·江原道 地圖 | Yongin, Gyeonggi | 2008-12-22 | |
| 1599 | | Gyeongsang chongyeodo (Comprehensive Map of Gyeongsang-do) 경상총여도 慶尙摠輿圖 | Nam District, Busan | 2008-12-22 | |
| 1600 | | Folding Screen of Jinjuseongdo (Jinjuseong Fortress) 진주성도 晉州城圖 | Dalseo District, Daegu | 2008-12-22 | |
| 1601 | | Cheonha yeojido (Map of the World) 천하여지도 天下輿地圖 | Jongno District, Seoul | 2008-12-22 | |
| 1602 | 조선팔도고금총람도 | Joseon paldo gogeum chongnamdo (Comprehensive Map of the Eight Provinces of Korea of Past and Present) 조선팔도고금총람도 朝鮮八道古今總攬圖 | Jongno District, Seoul | 2008-12-22 | |
| 1603 | | Shurangama Sutra (The Sutra of the Heroic One) 대불정여래밀인수증요의제보살만행수능엄경 大佛頂如來密因修證了義諸菩薩萬行首楞嚴經 | Jongno District, Seoul | 2009-02-23 | |
| 1604 | | Bronze Gong and Rack of Eunhaesa Temple, Yeongcheon 영천 은해사 청동북 및 북걸이 永川 銀海寺 靑銅金鼓 및 金鼓虡 | Yeongcheon, North Gyeongsang | 2009-02-23 | |
| 1605 | | Wooden Seated Sakyamuni Buddha Triad of Songnimsa Temple, Chilgok 칠곡 송림사 목조석가여래삼존좌상 漆谷 松林寺 木造釋迦如來三尊坐像 | Chilgok County, North Gyeongsang | 2009-02-23 | |
| 1606 | | Stone Seated Amitabha Buddha Triad of Songnimsa Temple, Chilgok 칠곡 송림사 석조아미타여래삼존좌상 漆谷 松林寺 石造阿彌陀如來三尊坐像 | Chilgok County, North Gyeongsang | 2009-02-23 | |
| 1607 | | Excavated Documents from the Wooden Seated Bhaisajyaguru Buddha of Donghwasa Temple, Daegu 대구 동화사 목조약사여래좌상 복장전적 大邱 桐華寺 木造藥師如來坐像 腹藏典籍 | Dong District, Daegu | 2009-02-23 | |
| 1608 | | Hanging Painting of Seonseoksa Temple, Seongju (The Vulture Peak Assembly) 성주 선석사 영산회 괘불탱 星州 禪石寺 靈山會 掛佛幀 | Seongju County, North Gyeongsang | 2009-02-23 | |
| 1609 | | Hanging Painting of Bogyeongsa Temple, Pohang 포항 보경사 괘불탱 浦項 寶鏡寺 掛佛幀) | Pohang, North Gyeongsang | 2009-02-23 | |
| 1610 | | Buddhist Painting of Donghwasa Temple, Daegu (Amitabha Buddha) 대구 동화사 아미타회상도 大邱 桐華寺 阿彌陀會上圖 | Dong District, Daegu | 2009-02-23 | |
| 1611 | | Buddhist Painting of Girimsa Temple, Gyeongju (Vairocana Buddha Triad) 경주 기림사 비로자나삼불회도 慶州 祇林寺 毘盧遮那三佛會圖 | Gyeongju, North Gyeongsang | 2009-02-23 | |
| 1612 | | Buddhist Painting (The Vulture Peak Assembly) and Excavated Relics of Bongnimsa Temple, Yeongcheon 영천 봉림사 영산회상도 및 복장유물 永川 鳳林寺 靈山會上圖 및 腹藏遺物 | Yeongcheon, North Gyeongsang | 2009-02-23 | |
| 1613 | | Buddhist Painting of Unmunsa Temple, Cheongdo (Vairocana Buddha Triad) 청도 운문사 비로자나삼신불회도 淸道 雲門寺 毘盧遮那三身佛會圖 | Cheongdo County, North Gyeongsang | 2009-02-23 | |
| 1614 | | Mural Painting of Bongjeongsa Temple, Andong (The Vulture Peak Assembly) 안동봉정사영산회상벽화 安東鳳停寺靈山會上壁畵 | Andong, North Gyeongsang | 2009-04-22 | |
| 1615 | | Wooden Seated Amitabha Buddha of Wangnyongsawon Temple, Gyeongju 경주 왕룡사원 목조아미타여래좌상 慶州 王龍寺院 木造阿彌陀如來坐像 | Gyeongju, North Gyeongsang | 2009-04-22 | |
| 1616 | | Gyehoedo (Gathering of Officials) Handed Down in the Yean Kim Clan 예안김씨가전계회도일괄 禮安 金氏 家傳契會圖 一括 | Dong District, Busan | 2009-04-22 | |
| 1617 | | Royal Certificate of Meritorious Subject Issued to Yi Heon-guk 이헌국 호성공신교서 李憲國扈聖功臣敎書 | Suseong District, Daegu | 2009-06-29 | |
| 1618-1 | | Seal of Emperor Gojong of the Korean Empire 대한제국 고종 황제어새 大韓帝國 高宗 皇帝御璽 | Jongno District, Seoul | 2009-09-02 | |
| 1618-2 | | 국새 황제지보 國璽 皇帝之寶 | Jongno District, Seoul | 2017-01-02 | |
| 1618-3 | | 국새 유서지보 國璽 諭書之寶 | Jongno District, Seoul | 2017-01-02 | |
| 1618-4 | | 국새 준명지보 國璽 濬明之寶 | Jongno District, Seoul | 2017-01-02 | |
| 1618-4 | | 국새 준명지보 國璽 濬明之寶 | Jongno District, Seoul | 2017-01-02 | |
| 1618-5 | | 국새 대군주보 國璽 大君主寶 | Jongno District, Seoul | 2021-08-24 | |
| 1618-6 | | 국새 제고지보 國璽 制誥之寶 | Jeonju, North Jeolla | 2021-08-24 | |
| 1618-7 | Imperial Royal Seal of the Great Han Empire 01 | 국새 칙명지보 國璽 勅命之寶 | Yongsan District, Seoul | 2021-08-24 | |
| 1618-8 | | 국새 대원수보 國璽 大元帥寶 | Yongsan District, Seoul | 2021-08-24 | |
| 1619 | | Wooden Seated Amitabha Buddha of Gaesimsa Temple, Seosan 서산 개심사 목조아미타여래좌상 瑞山 開心寺 木造阿彌陀如來坐像 | Seosan, South Chungcheong | 2009-10-20 | |
| 1620 | | Wooden Seated Avalokitesvara Bodhisattva of Bongjeongsa Temple, Andong 안동 봉정사 목조관음보살좌상 安東 鳳停寺 木造觀音菩薩坐像 | Andong, North Gyeongsang | 2009-10-20 | |
| 1621 | | Wooden Seated Vairocana Buddha at Jijangam Hermitage, Seoul 서울 지장암 목조비로자나불좌상 서울 地藏庵 木造毘盧遮那佛坐像 | Jongno District, Seoul | 2009-10-20 | |
