= Anguksa (Seoul) =

Shrine to Kang Kamch'an in South Korea

Coordinates: 37°28′15.31″N 126°57′40.13″E

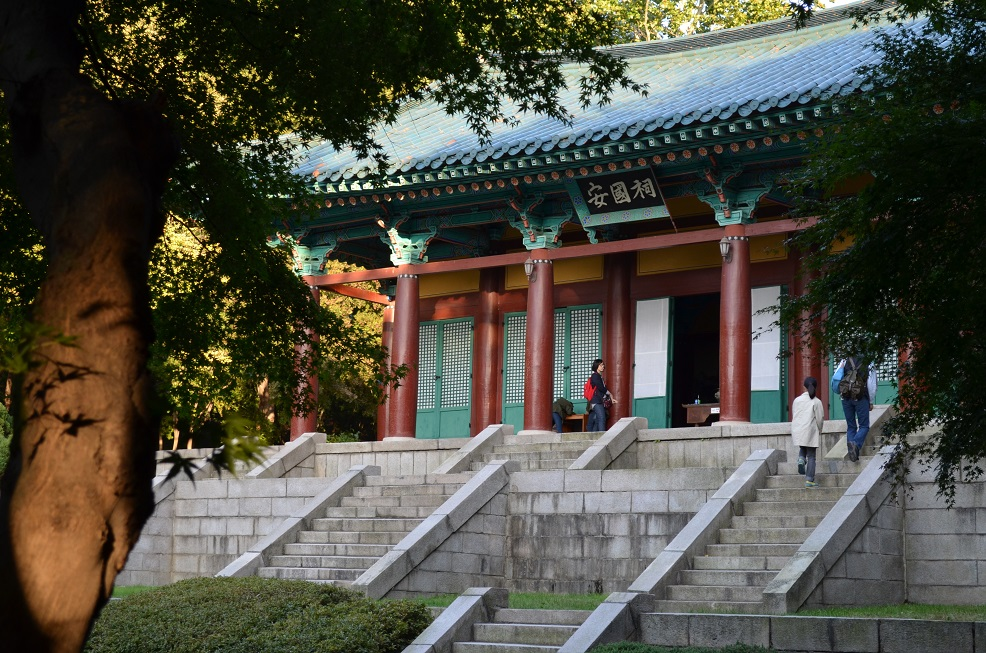
- Anguksa shrine in Nakseongdae Park, Seoul, South Korea

Korean name
- Hangul: 안국사
- Hanja: 安國祠
- RR: Anguksa
- MR: An'guksa

Anguksa (Korean: 안국사) is a shrine located in Nakseongdae Park, Seoul, South Korea. It was built in 1973–74 to commemorate General Kang Kam-ch'an (948–1031). A memorial ceremony is held at the shrine every October to commemorate the general.

== Description ==
The shrine itself was built in a style like that seen in the Goryeo period. It has high ceilings, and houses various portraits of General Gang.

Situated by the shrine is a Three Storied Stone Pagoda (designation Seoul Tangible Cultural Property No. 4) of the Goryeo dynasty, also erected to commemorate General Kang at the place of his birth, Nakseongdae. Nakseongdae (낙성대, 落星垈) literally means “place where a star has fallen,” and refers to the legend that a star fell from the sky when General Kang was born. The pagoda was moved from the original site of Gang's birth (Nakseongdae Yuji, 낙성대유지), and relocated to the Nakseongdae Park area in 1973.

In front of the shrine is a large statue of General Kang on horseback.

== Location ==
Anguksa shrine at Nakseongdae Park can be visited by taking the Green 02 bus from Nakseongdae Station on Subway Line 2.

== Gallery ==
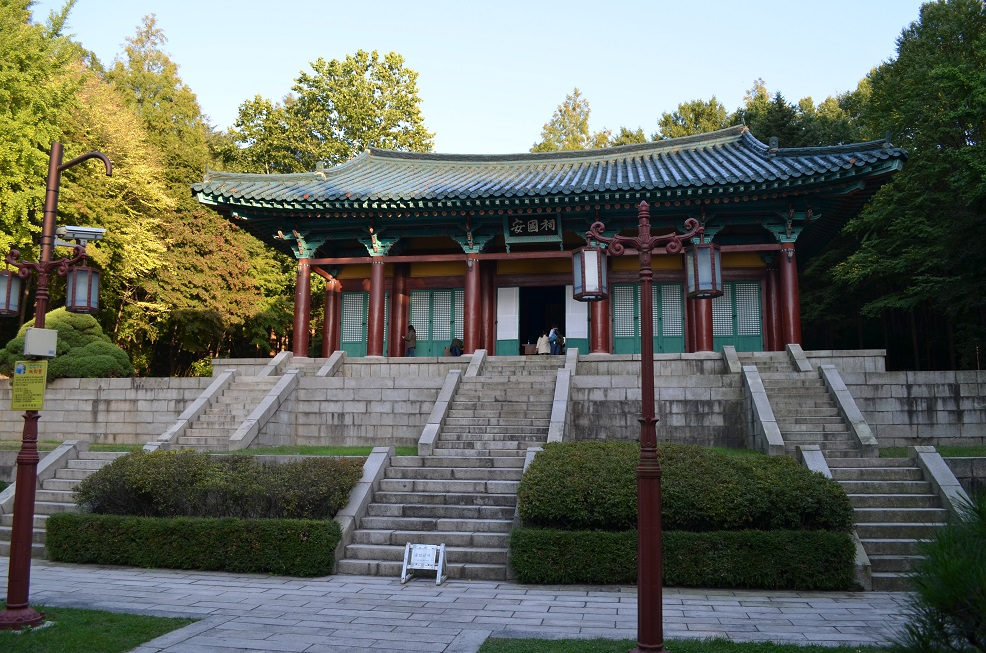
Anguksa shrine, 2013.

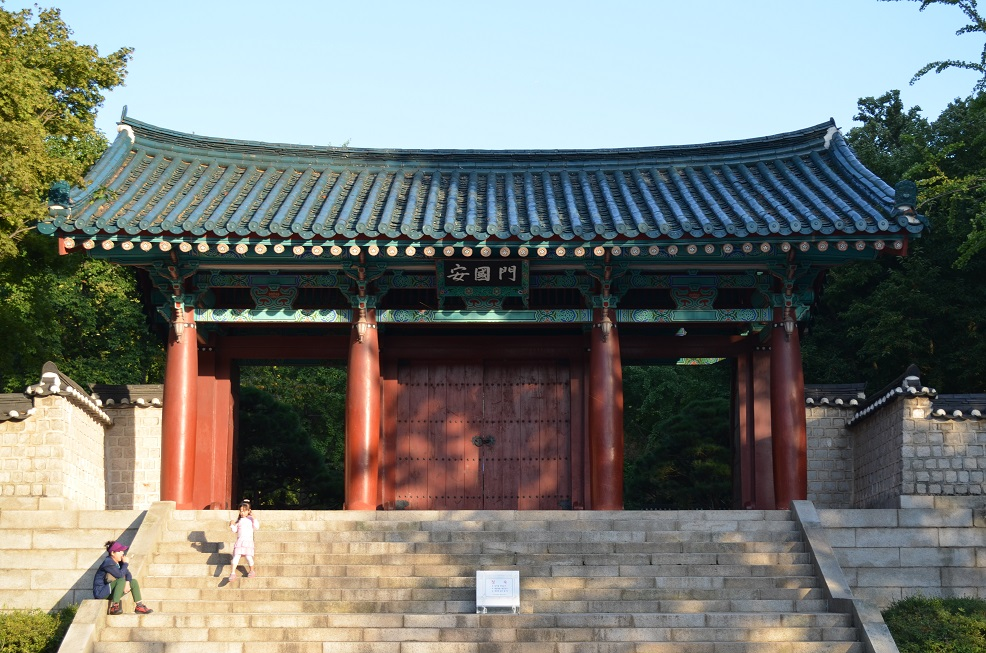
Angukmun gate, one of two gates leading to the shrine.

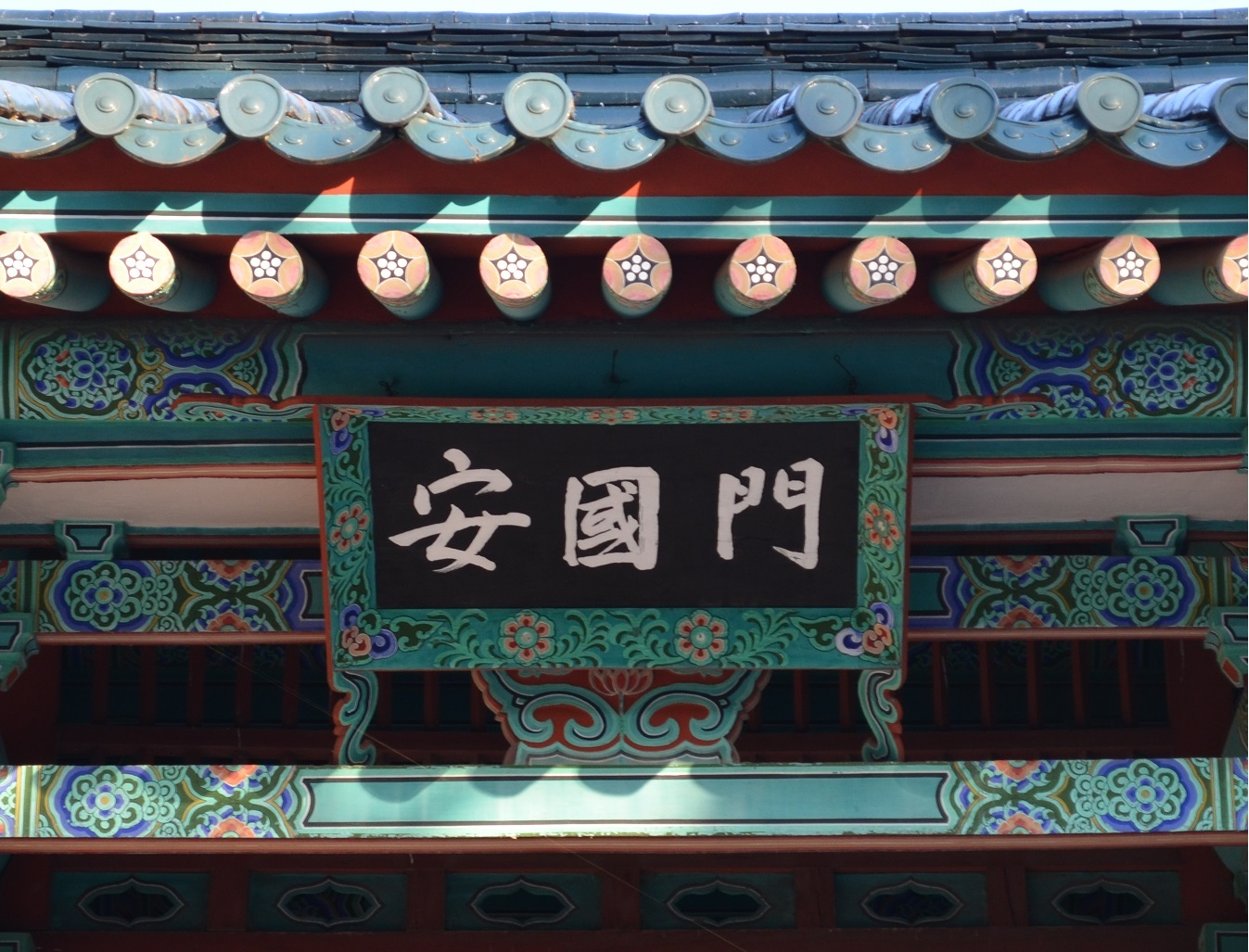
Signboard for the Angukmun gate.

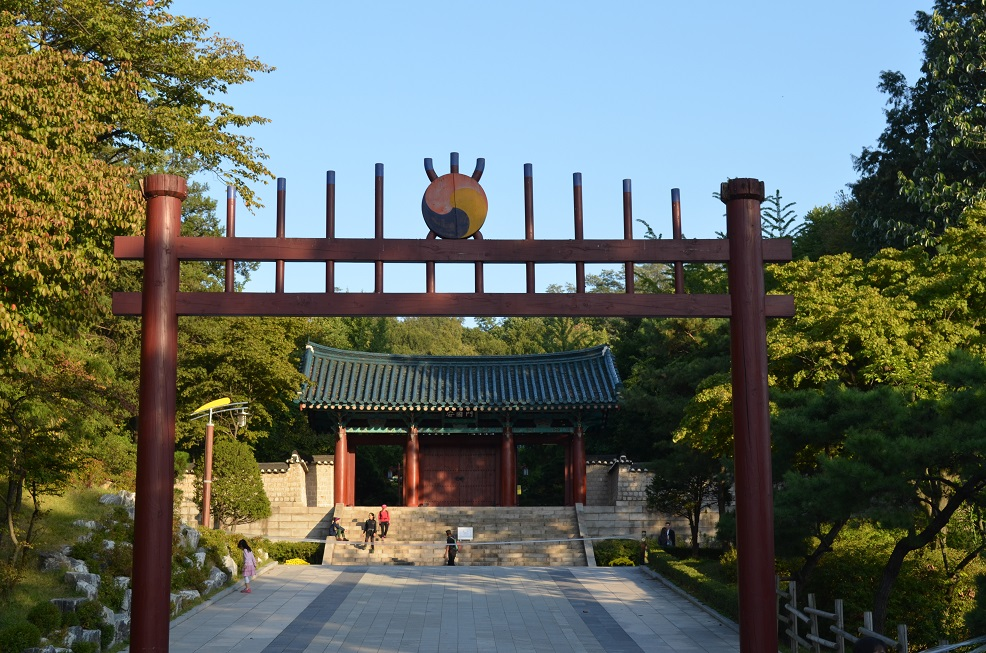
Entrance to the shrine area of the park. Angukmun gate sits behind.

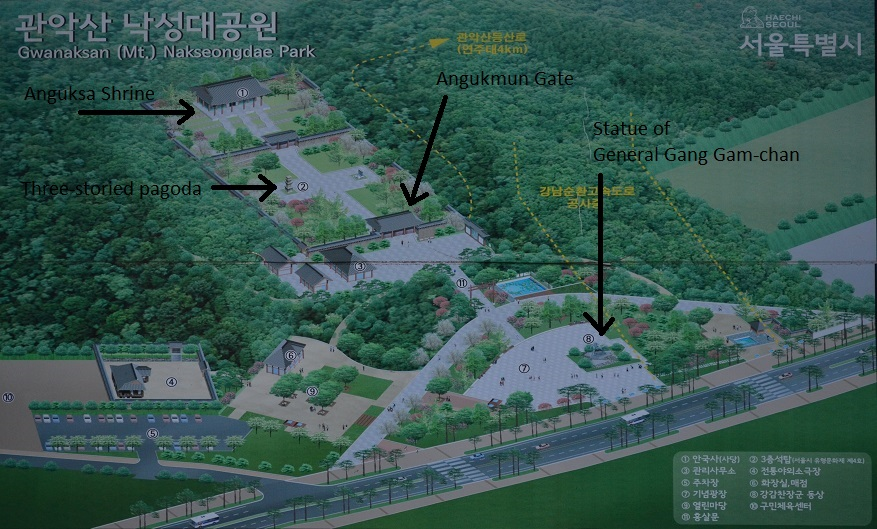
Overview of shrine and park area from park signage.
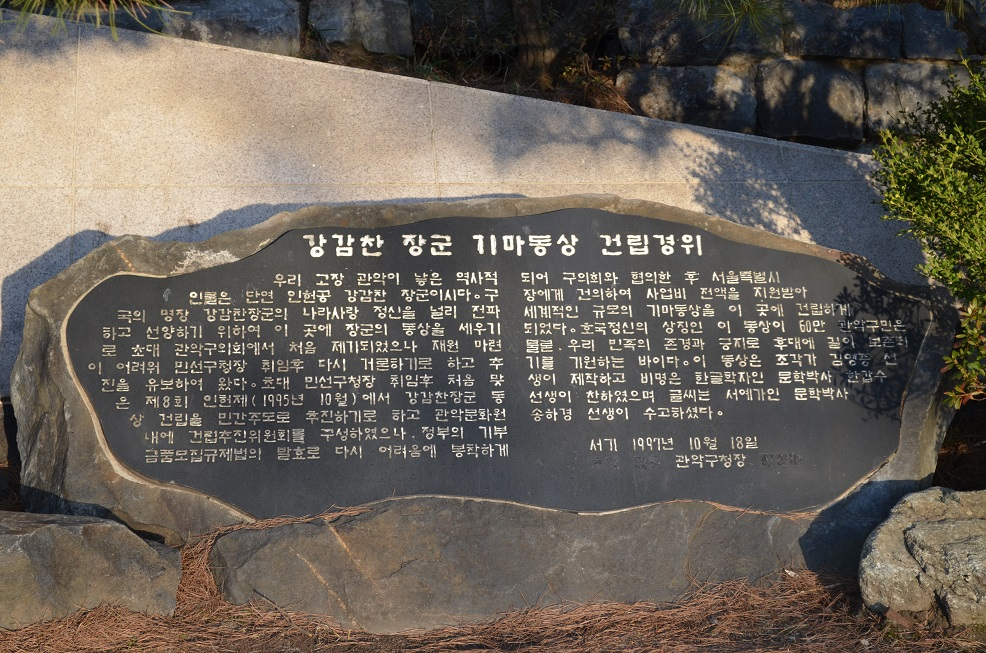
Inscription at the base of the statue.
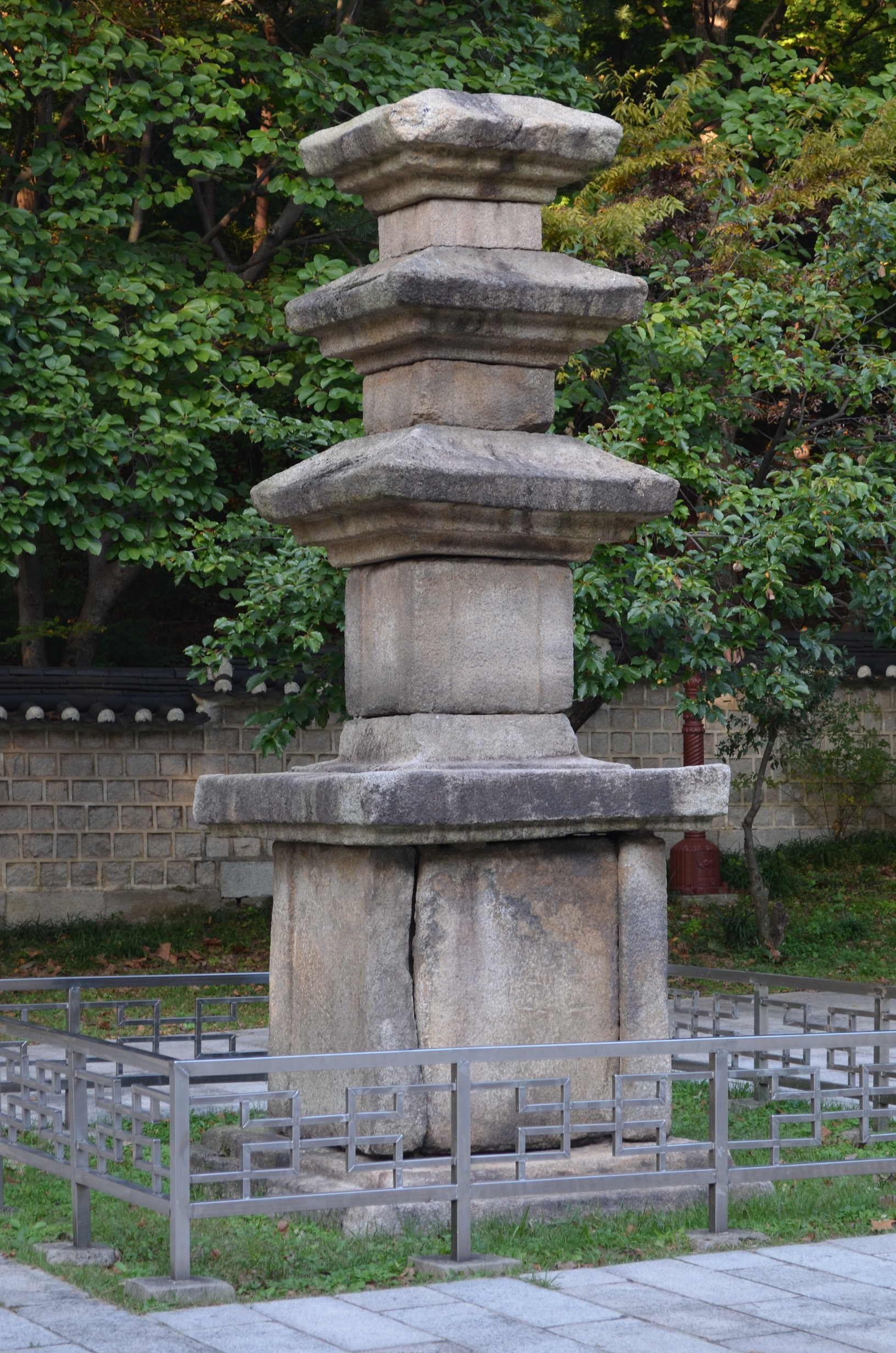
Three-storied pagoda.

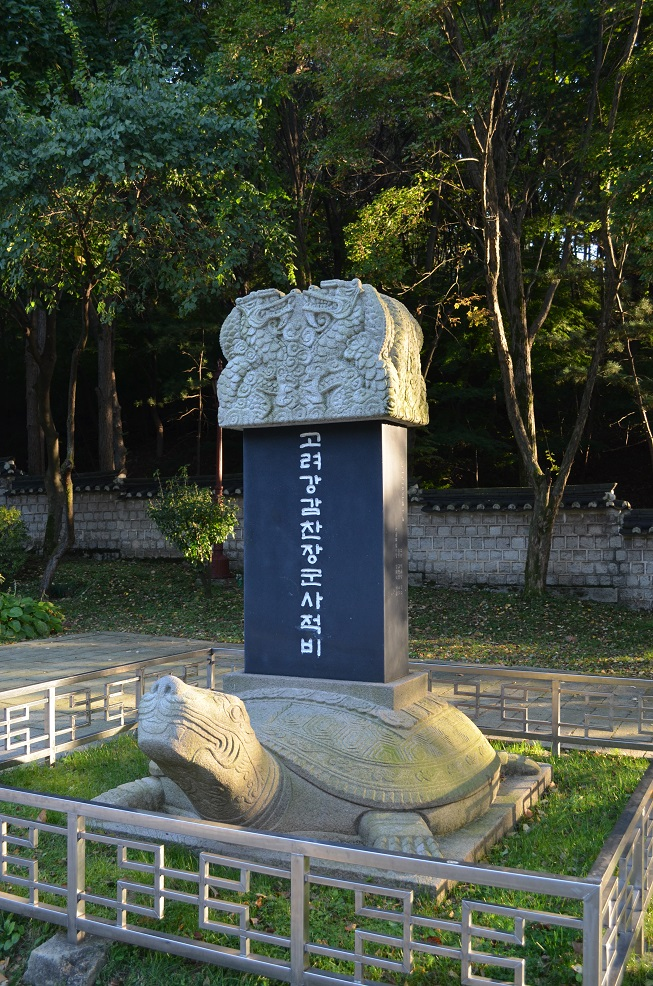
Turtle monument at shrine.

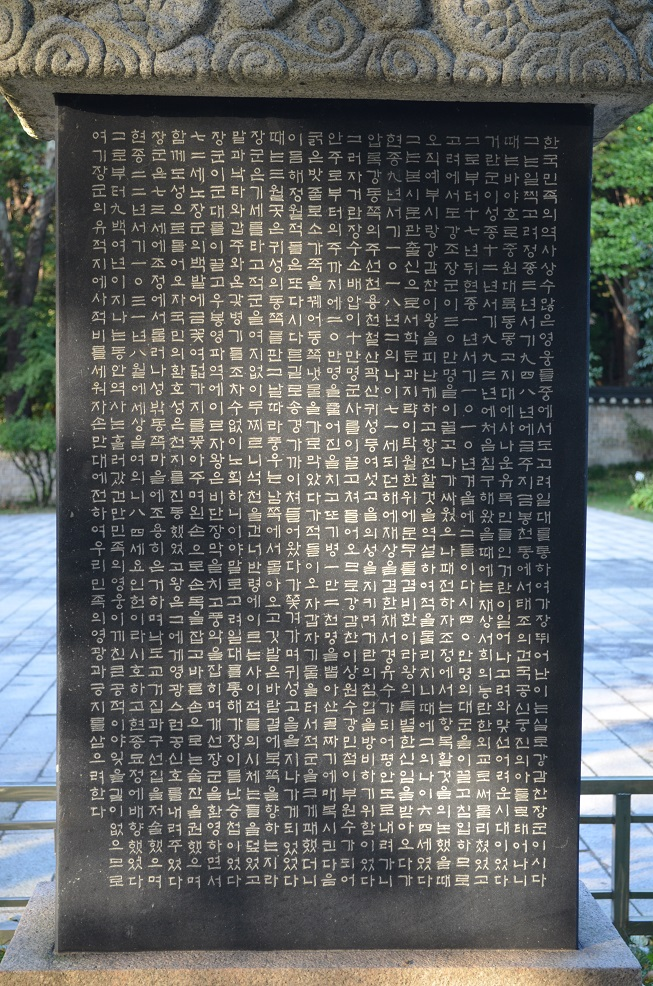
Back of the same monument.

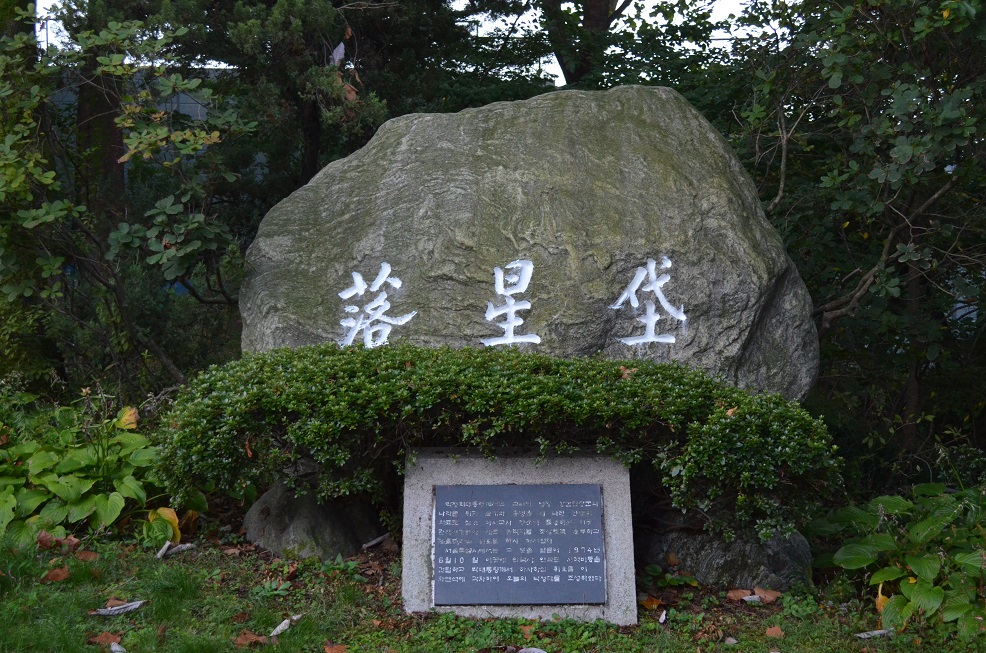
Rock monument at shrine. The three characters read "Nakseongdae."

== See also ==
- Kang Kam-ch'an
- Nakseongdae
