= Seoul National University station =

Subway station near Seoul National University in Gwanak, Seoul

Coordinates: 37°28′52″N 126°57′10″E

서울대입구 (관악구청); Seoul Nat'l Univ. (Gwanak-gu Office)
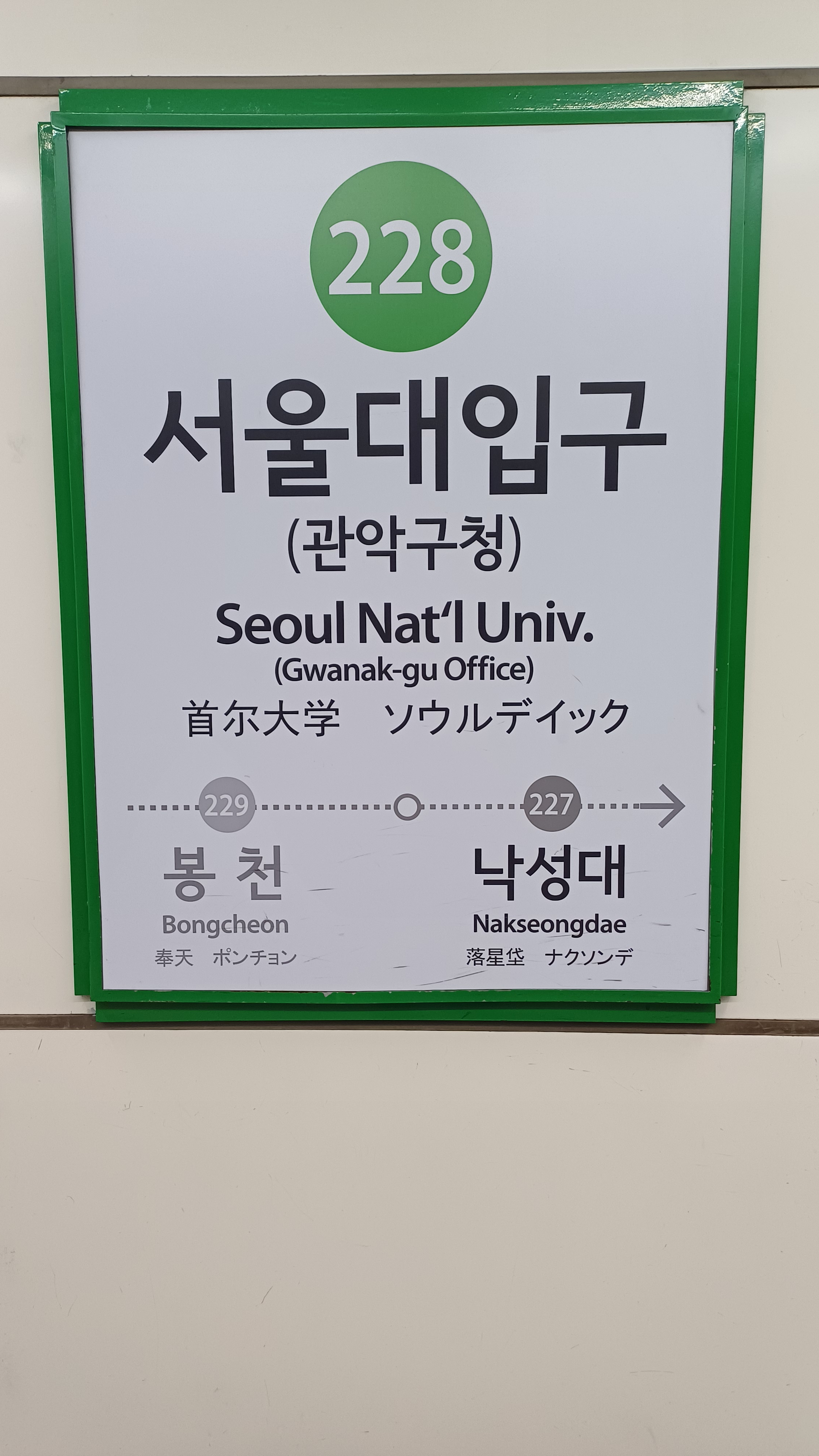
- Station sign in November 2025

Korean name
- Hangul: 서울대입구
- Hanja: 서울大入口
- Revised Romanization: Seouldaeipgu-yeok
- McCune–Reischauer: Sŏuldaeipku-yŏk

General information
- Location: 979-2 Bongcheon-dong, 1822 Nambusunhwanno Jiha, Gwanak-gu, Seoul
- Operator: Seoul Metro
- Line: Line 2
- Platforms: 1
- Tracks: 2

Construction
- Structure type: Underground

History
- Opened: December 17, 1983

Passengers
- (Daily) Based on Jan-Dec of 2012. Line 2: 107,086

Services
Preceding station	Seoul Metropolitan Subway	Following station
Nakseongdae Next counterclockwise	Line 2	Bongcheon Next clockwise
Location

Seoul National University Station is a station on Seoul Subway Line 2, located in Bongcheon-dong, Gwanak-gu of southern Seoul. This station has the subname Gwanak-gu Office. There are eight exits, two at each corner of the crossroads – of Nambu Beltway (Nambusunhwan-ro) and Gwanak-ro – where the station lies beneath.

Seoul National University Station has one curved island platform, which is wide in the middle and narrow at both ends. The platform screen doors were installed for both tracks by 2006. Escalators are available between the platform and the waiting/ticketing area. Despite being named the Seoul National University Station, Seoul National University is actually approximately 1.75 kilometres (1.09 mi) south of the station; it typically takes more than thirty minutes to reach the university on foot from the station.

In The Amazing Race 4, teams had to find this station (which was labeled only as Station 228) to obtain the next route marker.

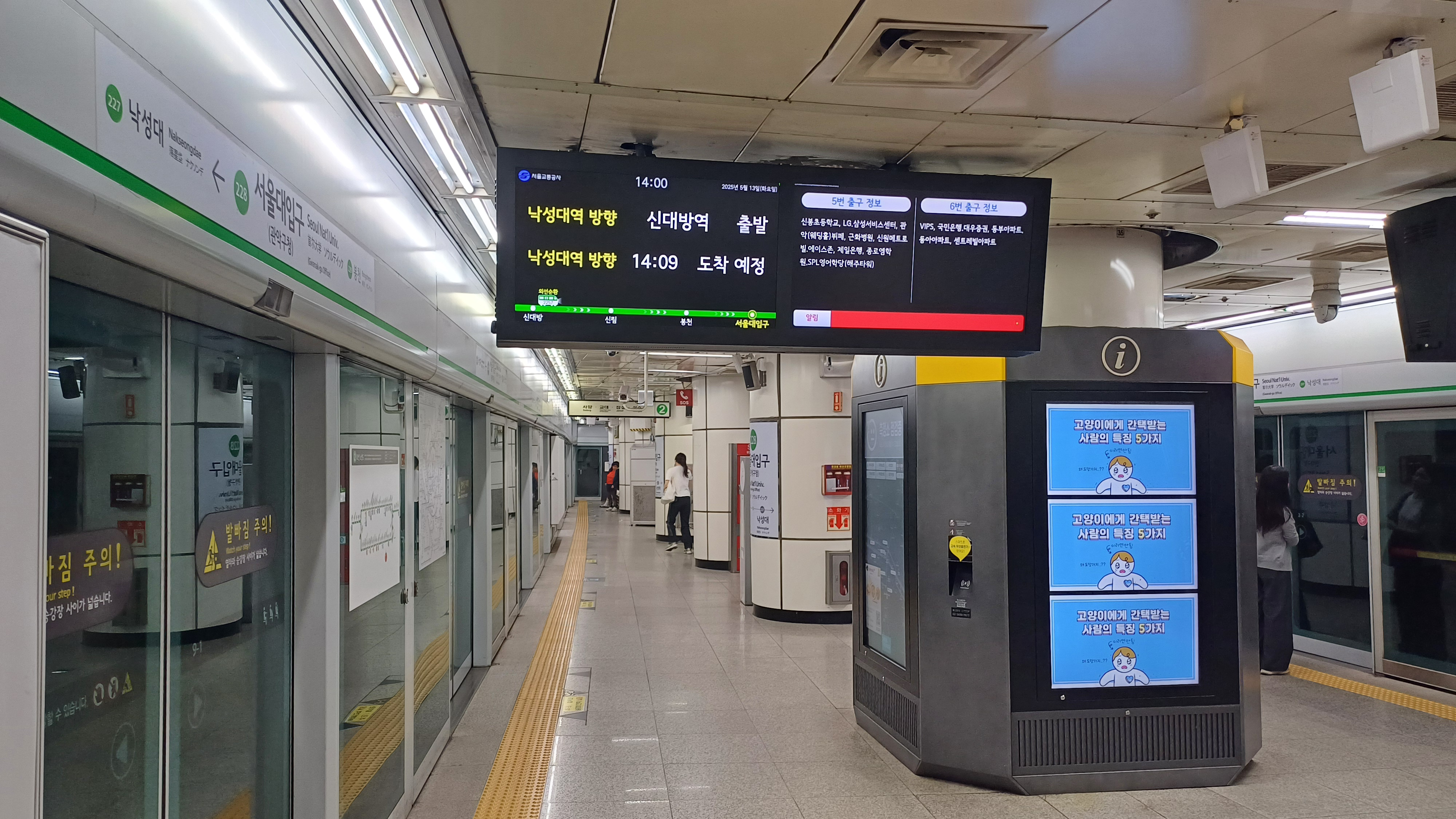
Station platform

== Station layout ==
G	Street level	Exit

L1; Concourse	Lobby	Customer Service, Shops, Vending machines, ATMs

L2; Platform level	Inner circle	← Line 2 Next clockwise (Bongcheon)
L2; Platform level	Island platform, doors will open on the left
L2; Platform level	Outer circle	Line 2 Next counterclockwise (Nakseongdae) →

== Vicinity ==
- Exit 1 : Hana Bank
- Exit 2 : Seoul National University (approximately 1.75 km (1.09 mi) away)
- Exit 3 : Seoul National University (approximately 1.75 km (1.09 mi) away), Gwanak Police Station, Cheongnyong Elementary School, Raboum Outlet
- Exit 4 : Gwanak District Office
- Exit 5 : Geunhwa Hospital
- Exit 6 : Bongcheon Central Market
- Exit 7 : Bongwon Middle School
- Exit 8 : Wondang Elementary School, Korea Post Office, Korea Exchange Bank
