= Nakseongdae station =

Station on Seoul Subway Line 2

Coordinates: 37°28′37″N 126°57′50″E

낙성대 (강감찬); Nakseongdae (Ganggamchan)
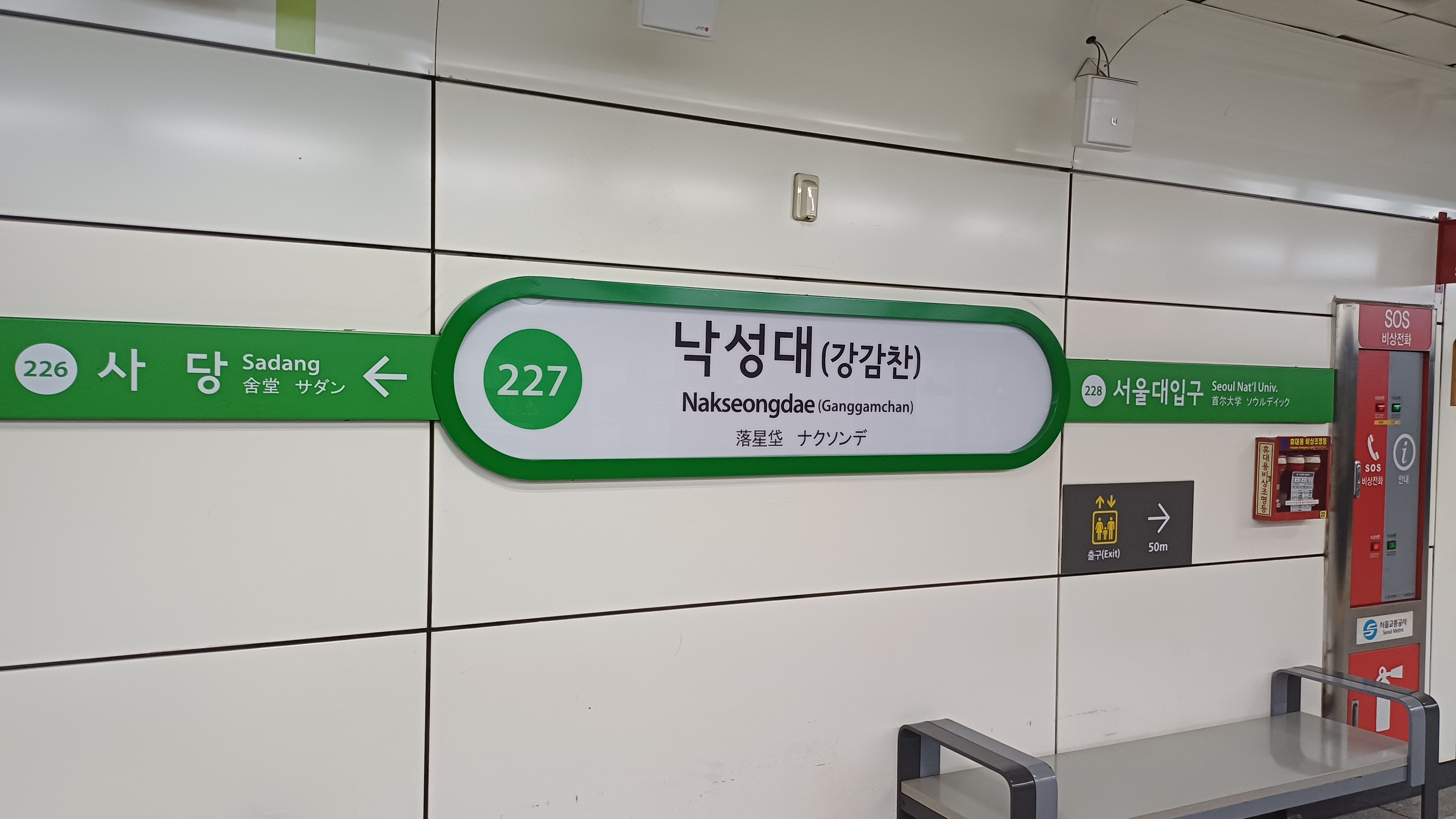

Korean name
- Hangul: 낙성대역
- Hanja: 落星垈驛
- Revised Romanization: Nakseongdae-yeok
- McCune–Reischauer: Naksŏngdae-yŏk

General information
- Location: 1693-39 Bongcheon-dong, 1928 Nambusunhwanno Jiha, Gwanak-gu, Seoul
- Operator: Seoul Metro
- Line: Line 2
- Platforms: 2
- Tracks: 2

Construction
- Structure type: Underground

History
- Opened: December 17, 1983

Passengers
- (Daily) Based on Jan-Dec of 2012. Line 2: 61,313

Services
Preceding station	Seoul Metropolitan Subway	Following station
Sadang Next counterclockwise	Line 2	Seoul National University Next clockwise
Location

Nakseongdae Station (Korean pronunciation: [naks͈ʌŋdɛ]) is a station on Seoul Subway Line 2. This station is named after a nearby place called Nakseongdae, which was the birthplace of the great Goryeo general Kang Kam-ch'an, (which is also the second name of this station) best known for his heroics against an invading Khitan force in the Battle of Gwiju.

This station is located in Bongcheon-dong, Gwanak-gu, Seoul.

== Station layout ==
G	Street level	Exit

L1; Concourse	Lobby	Customer Service, Shops, Vending machines, ATMs

L2; Platform level	Side platform, doors will open on the right
L2; Platform level	Inner circle	← Line 2 Next clockwise (Seoul Nat'l Univ.)
L2; Platform level	Outer circle	Line 2 Next counterclockwise (Sadang) →
L2; Platform level	Side platform, doors will open on the right
