= Bongcheon-Dong Ghost =

2011 horror webtoon by Horang

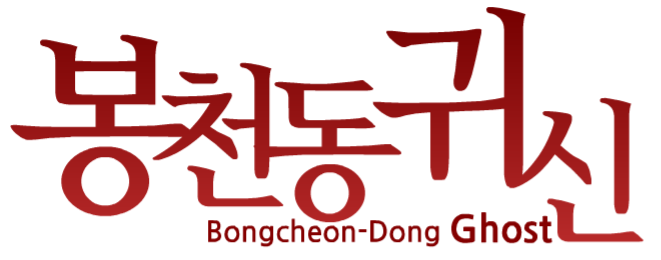
- Author: Horang
- Website: comic.naver.com
- Current status/schedule: One-off
- Launch date: August 23, 2011
- Publisher: Naver Webtoon
- Genre: Horror
- Preceded by: "Ok-su Station Ghost"

"Bongcheon-Dong Ghost" (Note: Korean: 봉천동 귀신; Hanja: 奉天洞鬼神; RR: Bongcheon-dong Gwisin) is a short South Korean horror webtoon created by Horang in 2011. Part of The Vault of Horror: A Collection of Nightmares (Korean version), (Note: Korean: 2011 미스테리 단편; RR: 2011 Mystery Danpyeon; lit. '2011 Mystery Shorts') (Note: The work is not included in the English version of The Vault of Horror: A Collection of Nightmares. Instead, the work is included in the English version of Chiller.) "Bongcheon-Dong Ghost" is an urban ghost story that uses sudden animations to deliver jump scares. The webcomic went viral shortly after its release.

== Background ==
In July 2011, artist Choi Jong-ho (최종호) also known as Horang (호랑), published the short webtoon "Ok-su Station Ghost" (Note: Korean: 옥수역 귀신; Hanja: 玉水驛鬼神; RR: Oksuyeok Gwisin) on Naver Webtoon. This webtoon, published as part of The Vault of Horror: A Collection of Nightmares (Korean version), included 3D-like effects, including in a scene in which a ghost's hand appears to jump out of the screen as if to grab the viewer. Horang followed this webcomic up with "Bongcheon-Dong Ghost", another short horror webtoon, the next month (August 2011), though one source gives the publication date as July 2011. An English fan translation and video dub were created in August, as the webcomic quickly went viral internationally. An official English translation was published on September 17. It was translated on the English page of Line Webtoon, an overseas service of Naver Webtoon, on November 1, 2015, when it was released as part of Chiller. On November 3, 2020, in the Horang's Nightmare, a remastered version of the work has also been translated into English, however, to read this, it should need to install the WEBTOON application.

== Synopsis ==
"Bongcheon-Dong Ghost" starts with a warning, stating "Reader discretion is advised for pregnant women, the elderly, and those suffering from serious medical conditions".

Set in Bongcheon-dong, Seoul, a student, walking home from school late at night, meets a female ghost who is apparently looking for her baby. The frightened student points in a random direction just to create distance between her and the ghost. However, as she starts to leave, the ghost rapidly chases her and quickly catches up with her, at which point she faints. When she is woken up by a neighbour the next day, she finds out that a woman in her district had committed suicide after losing custody of her child some time ago.

=== Animation ===
Horang uses two animations in the webcomic to deliver jump scares. The ghost's head suddenly rotates 180 degrees when the student first approaches her, and the rapid attack of the ghost is similarly animated.

== Impact and reviews ==
"Bongcheon-Dong Ghost" was popularized for English-speaking audiences in part by YouTuber PewDiePie. The Daily Dot, recommending it in a 2017 article, said it had become "a meme unto itself" and said "it has the same vibe as a dumb but terrifying ghost story told under the covers at summer camp, and once you're finished, you'll understand why so many people immediately share this comic with their friends."

"Bongcheon-Dong Ghost" served as an inspiration for the 2017 horror visual novel The Letter, alongside various Japanese horror works. The webtoon similarly influenced Cameron Lucente in creating his webcomic RoomZero.

Horang has continued creating horror webtoons: he has released a large number of short animated webcomics since 2007. In 2013, Horang posted "Ghost in the Masung Tunnel", which similarly used 3D animation and programming to set a mood and deliver jump scares.
