= Kang Kamch'an =

Korean general (948–1031)

- 강감찬
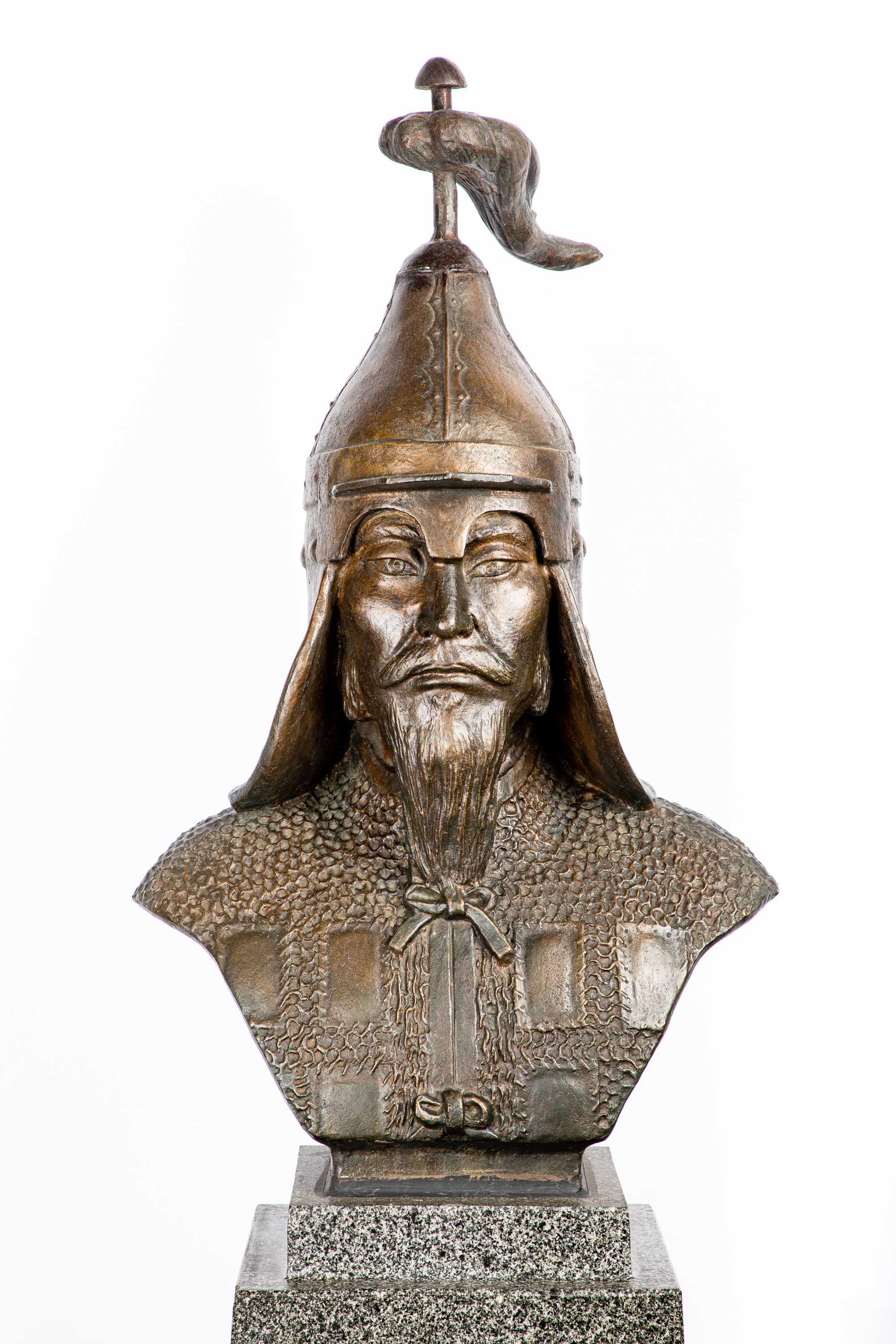
- Bust of Kang Kamch'an, War Memorial of Korea
- Born: 22 December 948; Geumju, Goryeo
- Died: 9 September 1031 (aged 82)
- Children: Kang Haeng-gyŏng
- Relatives: Kang Kung-jin (father)
- Military career
- Conflicts: Goryeo–Khitan War

Korean name
- Hangul: 강감찬
- Hanja: 姜邯贊 or 姜邯瓚
- RR: Gang Gamchan
- MR: Kang Kamch'an

Posthumous name
- Hangul: 인헌
- Hanja: 仁憲
- RR: Inheon
- MR: Inhŏn

Childhood name
- Hangul: 은천
- Hanja: 殷川
- RR: Euncheon
- MR: Ŭnch'ŏn

Kang Kamch'an (Korean: 강감찬; Hanja: 姜邯贊; 22 December 948 – 9 September 1031 (Note: In the Korean calendar (lunisolar), he was born on 19 November 948 and died on 20 August 1031.)) was a medieval Korean government official and military commander during the early days of the Goryeo period (918–1392). Even though he was a career scholar and government official, he is best known for his military victories during the Third Goryeo-Khitan War. Kang came from the Geumju Kang clan.

== Early life ==
Kang was born on 22 December 948 into a prominent aristocratic family in the hyeon of Geumju (now Gwanak District, Seoul). His father also worked for the King Taejo of Goryeo, and he had been awarded for helping establish a new dynasty and unifying the Korean Peninsula. A legend tells that on the day he was born a meteor fell toward his house, and an advisor to the king visited to find that a baby had just been born there, whom he predicted would become great and be long remembered. Kang Kamch'an's birth site is called Nakseongdae (site of the falling star), near Seoul's Nakseongdae Station on the Line two subway.

As a child, Kang was small for his age, but he showed signs of leadership and loyalty at an early age. At seven he began to learn Confucian philosophy, military tactics and martial arts from his father. After his father's death in 964, he left his household and traveled around the country. In 983, he received the top score in the civil service examination, and qualified as a government official at age thirty-six. In 992, he joined the royal court as a deputy under the Minister of Education.

== Goryeo-Khitan Wars ==
In 993, the Liao dynasty ordered General Xiao Paiya to invade Goryeo. The opinions among the court officials were divided, either to fight against the Khitans or to negotiate with them. Kang supported the use of negotiations, which was also supported by the king as the official decision. Sŏ Hŭi was sent to General Xiao as Korean representative, and the successful truce negotiation led to the withdrawal of Khitan forces and establishment of friendly relationship between Liao and Goryeo.

In 1004, the Khitans defeated the Chinese Song dynasty and forced its emperor to pay tribute to the Khitan. With Song defeated, the only threat remaining against the Khitans was Goryeo. Also in 1009, General Kang Cho of Goryeo led a coup against the government; he deposed and murdered King Mokjong and began a military rule, and broke the peaceful relationship with the Khitans. The Khitans saw this as their reason to attack Goryeo, and in 1010, Emperor Shengzong of Liao led a massive invasion with a contingent of 400,000 soldiers, commanding the troops himself. Suffering heavy casualties in five major engagements, the Khitans finally defeated the Goryeo army and executed their commander General Kang Cho.

However, Kang Kamch'an urged King Hyeonjong to escape from the palace, not to surrender to the invading Liao troops. The King followed Kang's advice, and managed to escape from the burning capital. A Korean insurgency began to harass Khitan forces, which finally compelled Shengzong to withdraw his army. The Khitans gained no benefit from the war; rather spending precious resources in vain and reducing the national treasury. Thus another bloody war between the two nations was foreshadowed, and tensions would further lead to the Third Goryeo-Khitan War. In 1011, after the Khitan invasion was over, Kang was promoted to Hallim Academican Recipient of Edicts (한림학사 승지; 翰林學士 承旨; Hallim haksa sŭngji).

In 1018, General Xiao Baiya, under orders of the Liao administration, led an expedition to Goryeo with a 100,000 man contingent. This time, many officials urged the king to commence peace negotiations, since the damage from the Second Goryeo-Khitan War had been so great, leaving Goryeo difficult to recover. However, Kang advised the king to declare war against the Liao, since the enemy contingent was much smaller than in previous invasions. He volunteered to be the acting deputy War minister for the duration of the war, at the age of seventy-one. He led about 208,000 men toward the Goryeo-Liao border.

The first battle of the war was the Battle of Heunghwajin, which was a significant victory of Goryeo by blocking the stream and destroying the dam when Khitans were crossing the water. However, General Xiao did not give up the hope of capturing the capital Gaegyeong, and continued to march south. Later, Xiao realized that the mission was impossible to accomplish, and decided to retreat. General Kang knew that the Khitan army would withdraw from the war, and awaited them at the fortress of Gwiju, where he encountered the retreating Khitans in 1019.

Discouraged and starving, the Khitans were defeated by the Goryeo army. Only General Xiao and few remaining survivors managed to escape from the devastating defeat. This battle is known as the Battle of Gwiju. General Kang returned to the capital and was welcomed as the military hero who saved the kingdom. After the war, in 1020, Kang retired from both the military and the government to rest, since he was too old, already having become a national hero. He was appointed as Supreme Chancellor in 1030, one year before his death. He died in 1031 on the 20th day of the 8th lunar month (9 September 1031). He was buried in modern-day Cheongju, South Korea.

== Legacy ==
General Kang's overwhelming victories in the battles of Kwiju and Heunghwajin are often compared with the victories of General Ŭlchi Mundŏk at the Battle of Salsu or Admiral Yi Sun-sin at the battles of Hansan and Myeongnyang, which, like Kang's battles, overcame disadvantages and successfully defended the country. Of course, Kang is regarded as one of the greatest military commanders in Korean history, along with General Ŭlchi and Admiral Yi, even though Kang was never trained as a soldier like Ŭlchi or Yi.

Following his victories in the Third Goryeo-Khitan War, the peace among the three powerful East-Asian empires settled; Goryeo established a peaceful but tense relationship with the Liao dynasty, which gave up the hope of taking over either Song or Goryeo. As a result, Goryeo broke off relationships with the Song dynasty, but continued commercial trading with the Chinese; Song continued to pay tribute to Liao, and Song would also pay tribute to Western Xia, which would pay tribute to the Khitans. The peace lasted for about a century. The Jurchens took advantage of this time to expand their power without any interruption until their establishment of the Jin dynasty. The Song dynasty got the least benefit from the peace, and secretly encouraged the Jurchens to attack Liao, but after the fall of the Khitans, the Jurchens turned on Song and took over its capital, forcing the Chinese to flee southward. The victories of General Kang thus marked the ending point of the chain of wars between countries and was the beginning of a triangle diplomacy (Goryeo, Liao, Song), setting the scene for the ascendance of the Jurchens.

Kang's shrine, called Anguksa, stands today in Sadang-dong, Gwanak District, Seoul.

== Popular culture ==
- Portrayed by Lee Deok-hwa in the 2009 KBS2 TV series Empress Cheonchu.
- Portrayed by Choi Soo-jong in the 2023 KBS2 TV series Korea–Khitan War

== See also ==
- List of Goryeo people
- Military history of Korea
- Battle of Kwiju
- Goryeo
- Goryeo-Khitan Wars
