= Nakseongdae =

Park in Seoul, South Korea

- Interactive map of Nakseongdae
- Location: Gwanak District, Seoul, South Korea
- Coordinates: 37.471223°N 126.959983°E
- Public transit: Nakseongdae Station

Nakseongdae (Korean pronunciation: [naks͈ʌŋdɛ]; Korean: 낙성대; Hanja: 落星垈) is a park located in Gwanak, Seoul. It is the birthplace of Goryeo general, Kang Kam-ch'an.

== Toponymy ==
Nakseongdae means "where a star landed" in Hanja. This alludes to a legend surrounding general Kang Kam-ch'an; it is said that when he was born, a star fell to the earth and landed at the location of the park.

== Description ==
In 1972, the park was designated as a Tangible Cultural Heritage of Seoul. From 1973 to 1974, the shrine Anguksa (안국사; 安國祠) was constructed in the park. This shrine is dedicated to General Kang. Stone wall of 409 meter circumference was built to surround it.

Near the park is Nakseongdae Station of Seoul Subway Line 2.

The park is located close to Seoul National University (SNU), which is often considered the top university in South Korea. The term Nakseongdae resembles the name of a university, owing particularly to the term dae (대; 大). Due to its proximity to SNU, it has become used as a euphemism or nickname for the university. The term is sometimes used to avoid the appearance of bragging about attending South Korea's top university.
