= Gwanak District =

District of Seoul, South Korea

Gwanak
- Autonomous District
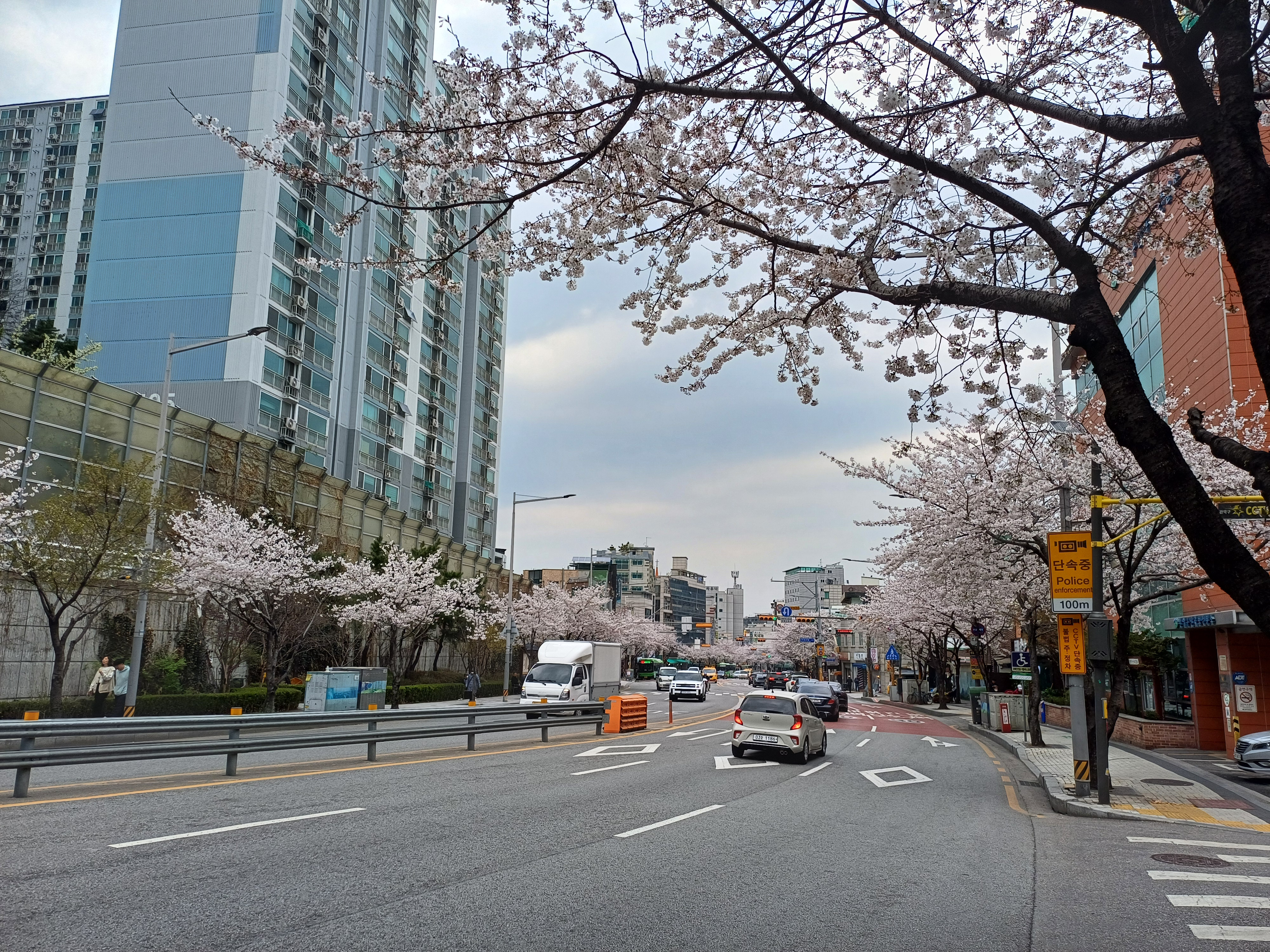
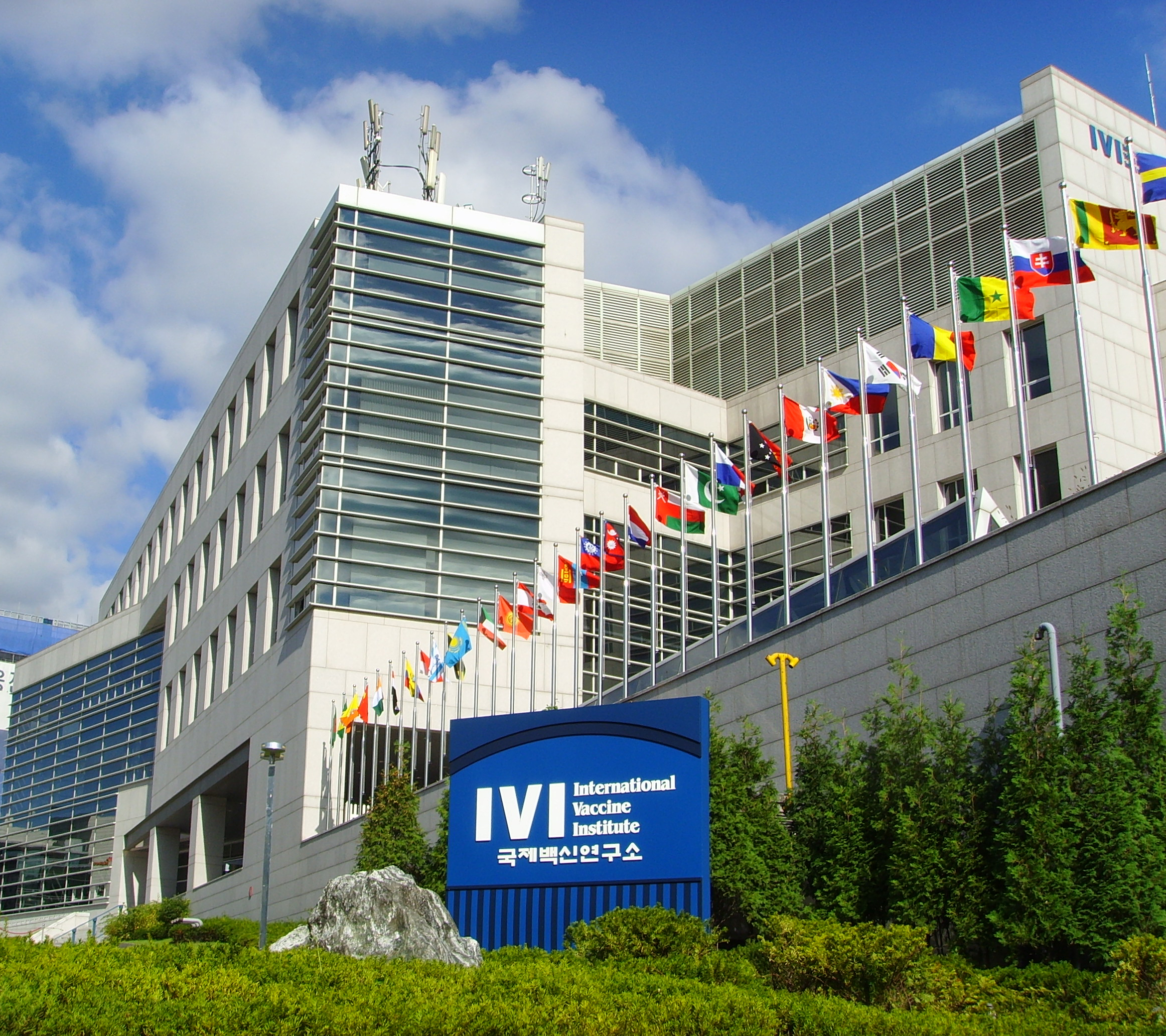
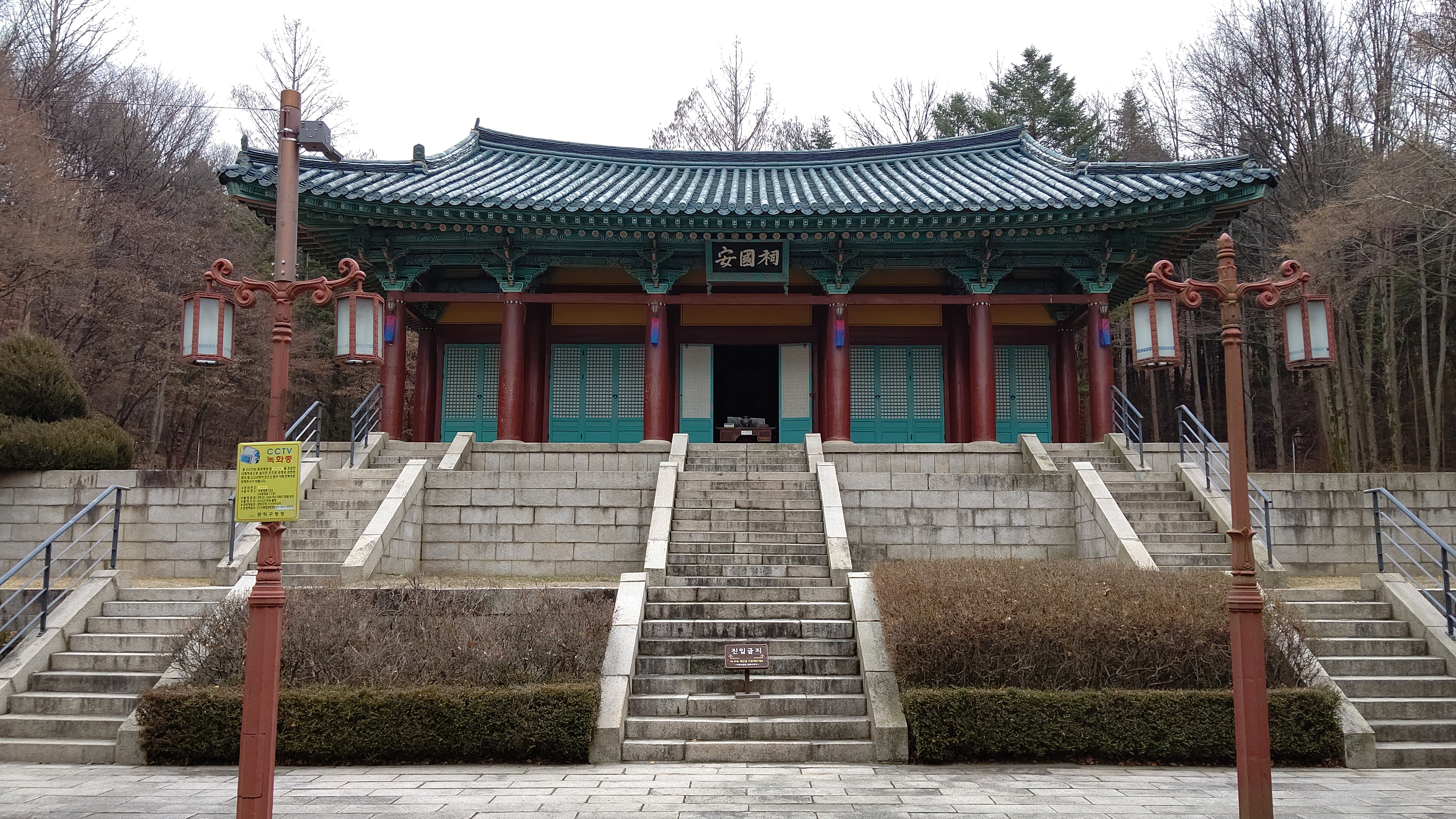
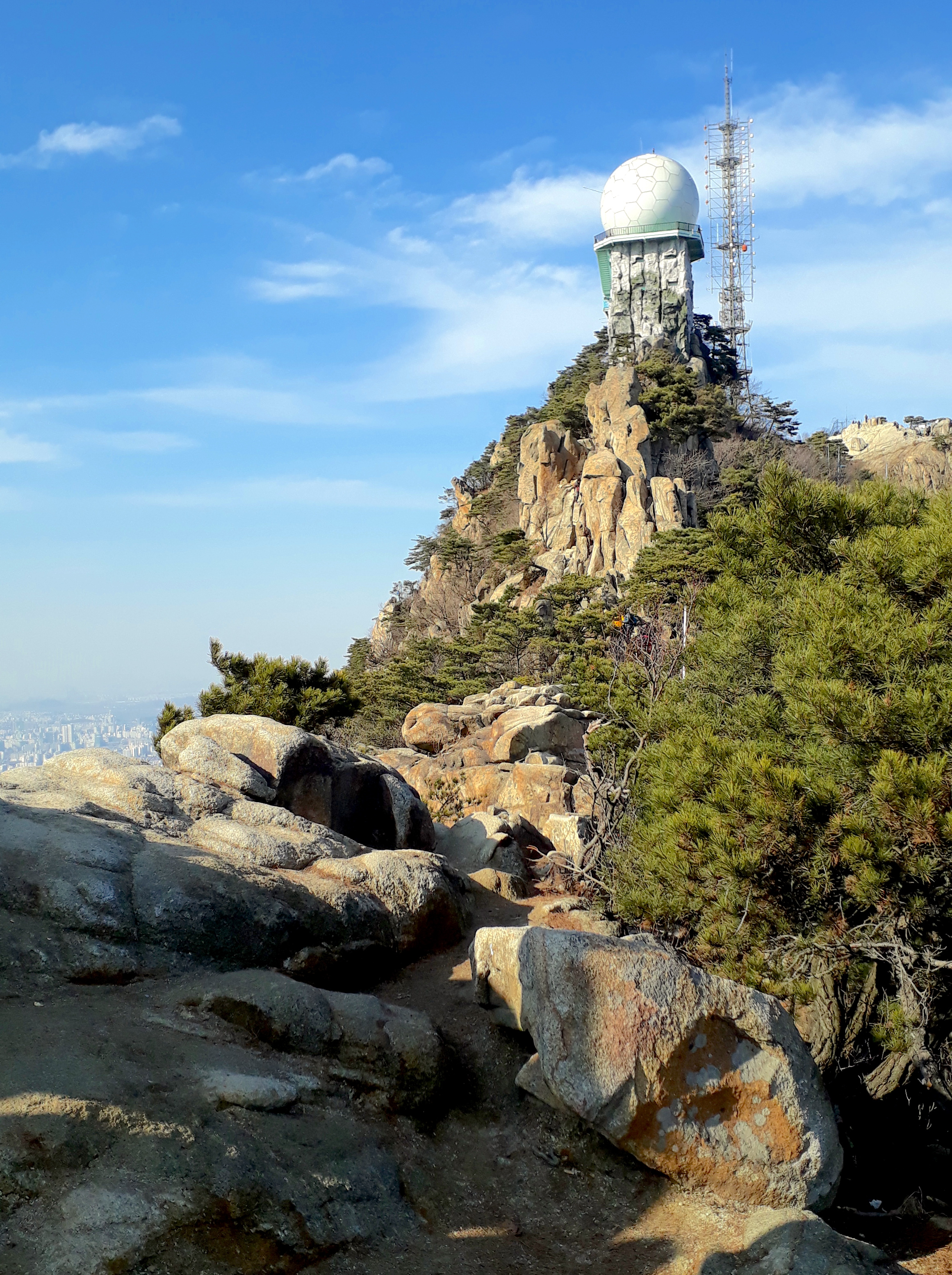
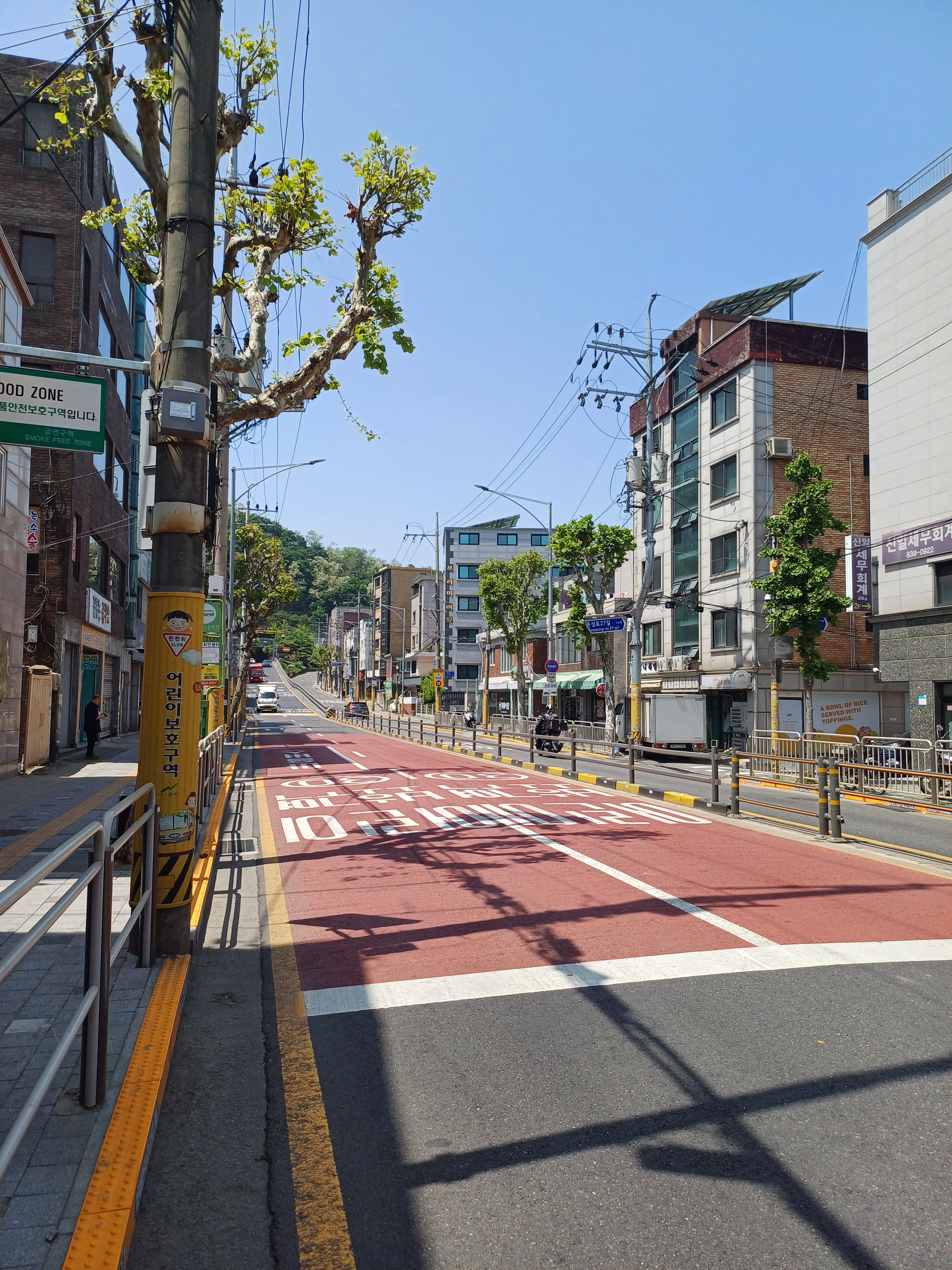
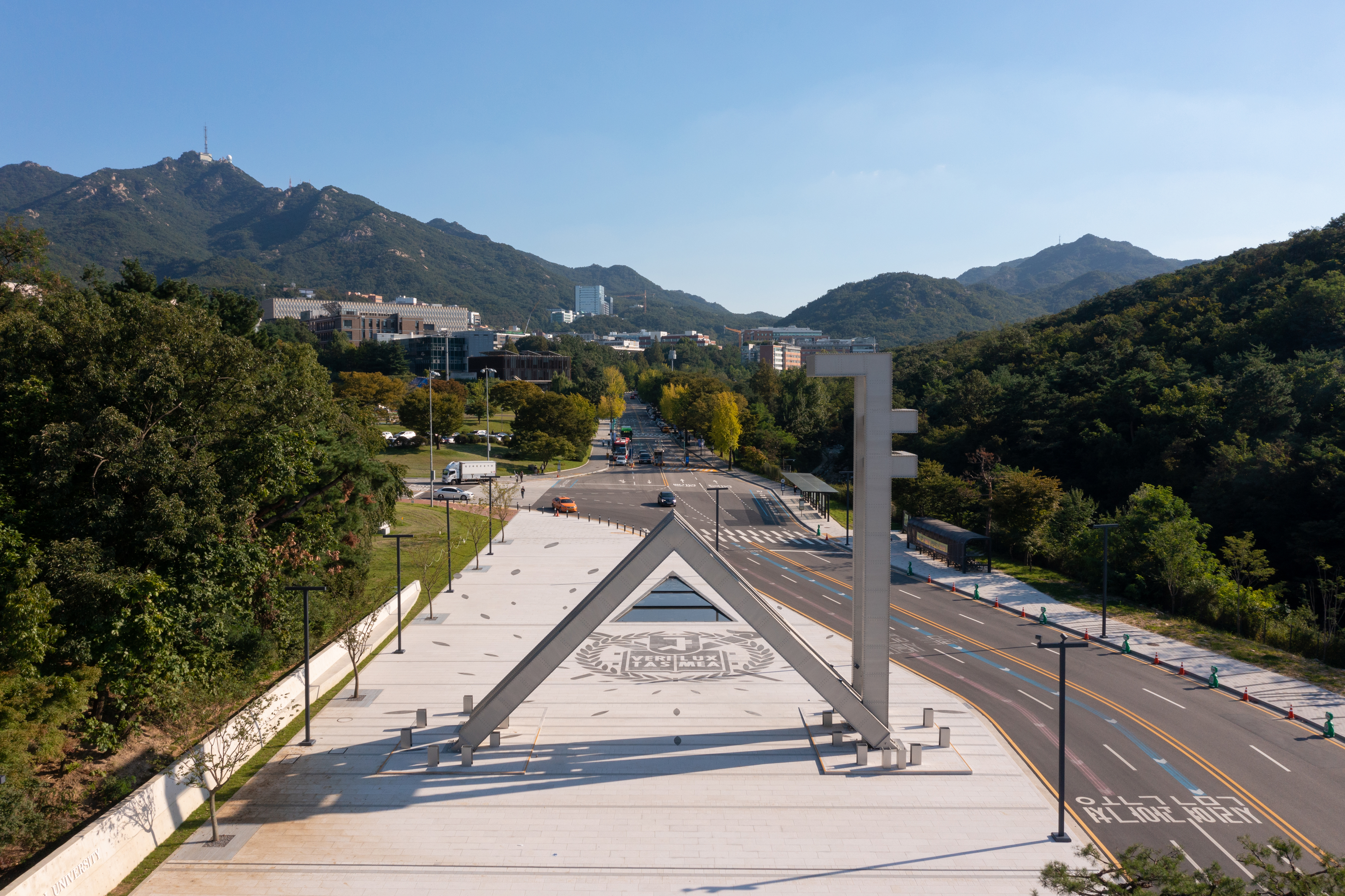
- Nangok-ro IVI headquarters Anguksa Shrine Gwanaksan Munseong-ro Seoul National University (Main Gate)

- Flag

- Location of Gwanak District in Seoul
- Interactive map of Gwanak
- Coordinates: 37.4784°N 126.9516°E
- Country: South Korea
- Region: Sudogwon
- Special City: Seoul
- Administrative dong: 21

Government
  - Body: Gwanak-gu Council
  - Mayor: Park Jun-hee (Democratic)
  - MNAs: List of MNAs: Yoo Ki-hong (Democratic); Jeong Tae-ho (Democratic)

Area
  - Total: 29.57 km^{2} (11.42 sq mi)

Population (2010)
  - Total: 520,849
  - Density: 17,610/km^{2} (45,620/sq mi)
- Time zone: UTC+9 (Korea Standard Time)
- Postal code: 08700 – 08899
- Area codes: +82-2-5xx, 8xx
- Website: Gwanak District official website

Korean name
- Hangul: 관악구
- Hanja: 冠岳區
- RR: Gwanak-gu
- MR: Kwanak-ku

Gwanak District (Korean: 관악구) is one of the 25 districts (gu) of Seoul, South Korea. It lies on the southern skirt of Seoul, bordering Anyang, Gyeonggi Province. The southern border of Gwanak District, bordering Anyang, consists of the craggy ridgeline of Gwanaksan (Mt. Gwanak), which dominates the local geography.

Originally a part of Siheung, Gyeonggi Province, it was transferred to Seoul with the rapid expansion of the National Capital Area and its population growth in 1960s. Partitioned from Yeongdeungpo District and established as a district in 1973, it now neighbours the Seocho, Dongjak, Guro, and Geumcheon Districts, and exercises jurisdiction over 21 neighborhoods (dong), with a population of 500,000.

== Overview ==
Gwanak District is densely populated with over 500,000 people. While it was once a rural area dominated by the presence of Gwanaksan (Mt. Gwanak), population booms in the late 1950s and early 1960s, accompanied by rapid industrialization of the capital area, quickly changed the town into a mosaic of dense residential and industrial areas. Large slum quarters were formed by migrant populations from all over Korea who sought jobs in industrialized Seoul. A series of redevelopment projects starting in the 1970s, and the relocation of Seoul National University to the district, led to a reduction of slum quarters and indigent textile industries and transformed the town into a residential uptown neighborhood of Seoul. The area is also heavily populated by university students from surrounding provinces.

=== Commercial zones ===
Central commercial zones include the Seorim and Daehak area and the Cheongnyong area near Seoul National University. These areas also form a large zone of private dormitories and small houses, which primarily target university students and national examination takers (gosi-saeng) looking for an environment that is favorable for studying. Restaurants, supermarkets, bars and pubs in the area are centered in Nokdu Street (Nokdu-geori) in the Daehak area and near Seoul National University Station. Other commercial zones for residents are located along the Nambu Beltway and two main roads.

The main shopping district, the Bongcheon Central Market (Bongcheon-jungang-sijang), is positioned in Jungang neighborhood, north from Seoul National University Station.

== Transportation ==
Nambu Beltway, which circles Seoul, passes through the very center of the district. The beltway and two main avenues, Gwanak Road (Gwanak-ro) and Sillim Road (Sillim-ro), make the main route of the automobile traffic. Nambu Beltway is connected to multiple expressways.

=== Public transportation ===
Green Line (Line 2) and Blue Line (Line 4) of Seoul Metro links Gwanak District and other areas. Many trunk (painted in blue) buses such as 501, 506, 651 and 750 lines, and branch (in green) buses in 5XXX or X5XX line passes Gwanak area.

==== Metro stations ====
- Seoul Metro (Seoul Metropolitan Rapid Transit Corporation)
  - Seoul Subway Line 2 (Green Line)
    - (Dongjak) ← Nakseongdae — Bongcheon — Sillim → (Dongjak)
  - Seoul Subway Line 4 (Blue Line)
    - (Dongjak) ← Sadang → (Seocho)

== Administrative divisions ==
Administrative divisions

There are three statutory subdivisions: Sillim, Bongcheon and Namhyeon neighborhood. Those are further divided into multiple administrative neighborhoods (dong) to balance excessive populations and for administrative expedience. As of September 2008, there are 21 administrative neighborhoods in Gwanak District.

Statutory neighborhood	Administrative neighborhood	Hangul	Hanja
Sillim	Seowon	서원	書院
Sillim	Sinwon	신원	新源
Sillim	Seorim	서림	西林
Sillim	Nangok	난곡	蘭谷
Sillim	Sinsa	신사	新士
Sillim	Sillim	신림	新林
Sillim	Samseong	삼성	三聖
Sillim	Nanhyang	난향	蘭香
Sillim	Jowon	조원	棗園
Sillim	Daehak	대학	大學
Sillim	Miseong	미성	美星
Bongcheon	Euncheon	은천	殷川
Bongcheon	Seonghyeon	성현	成賢
Bongcheon	Cheongnyong	청룡	靑龍
Bongcheon	Boramae	보라매	No hanja notation
Bongcheon	Cheongnim	청림	靑林
Bongcheon	Haengun	행운	幸運
Bongcheon	Nakseongdae	낙성대	落星垈
Bongcheon	Jungang	중앙	中央
Bongcheon	Inheon	인헌	仁憲
Namhyeon	Namhyeon	남현	南峴

== Points of interest ==
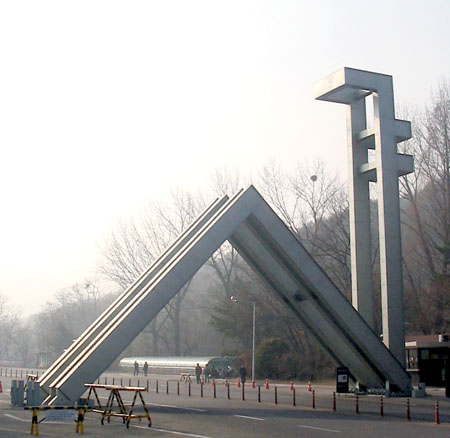
Seoul National University main gate

- Seoul National University
  - Kyujanggak Archives
  - Seoul National University Museum of Art
- Seoul Museum of Art, South Branch (SeMA Nam-Seoul)
  - Former Belgian Consulate Building
- Horim Museum
- Nokdu Street
- Nakseongdae
  - Anguk Shrine
- Gwanaksan (Mt. Gwanak)
  - Gwaneumsa (in Gwanaksan Park)

== Sister cities ==
- Daxing, Beijing, China
- Tiexi, Shenyang, China
- Royal Kingston, London, United Kingdom
- Montgomery County, Pennsylvania, United States of America

== Notable people from Gwanak District ==
- Kang Kam-ch'an, Korean medieval government official and military commander during the early days of Goryeo Dynasty
- Yang Jungwon (정원), singer, dancer and K-pop idol, leader and member of K-pop boygroup ENHYPEN
- Solji (Real Name: Heo Sol-ji, 허솔지), singer, dancer, model and K-pop idol, leader and member of K-pop girlgroup EXID and former member of ballad duo group 2NB
- Taeyong (Real Name: Lee Tae-yong, 이태용), singer-songwriter, rapper, dancer and K-pop idol, leader and member of K-pop boygroup NCT, of its subunits NCT U and NCT 127 and member of the K-pop superboygroup Super M
- Hyeju (Real Name: Son Hye-ju, 손혜주), singer, dancer and K-pop idol, member of girlgroup Loona, and it's subunits Loona yyxy, and Loossemble
- Lim Na-young (임나영), singer, rapper, dancer, and actress, former leader and member of K-pop girlgroups I.O.I and Pristin
- Hong Eun-chae (홍은채), singer, dancer, and K-pop idol, member of girlgroup Le Sserafim under Source Music, and current host of KBS Music Bank

== See also ==
- Geography of South Korea
- Gwanaksan
- Seoul National University
- Nokdu Street
- Nakseongdae
