= Bongcheon-dong =

Neighborhood in Seoul, South Korea

Coordinates: 37.479°N 126.954°E

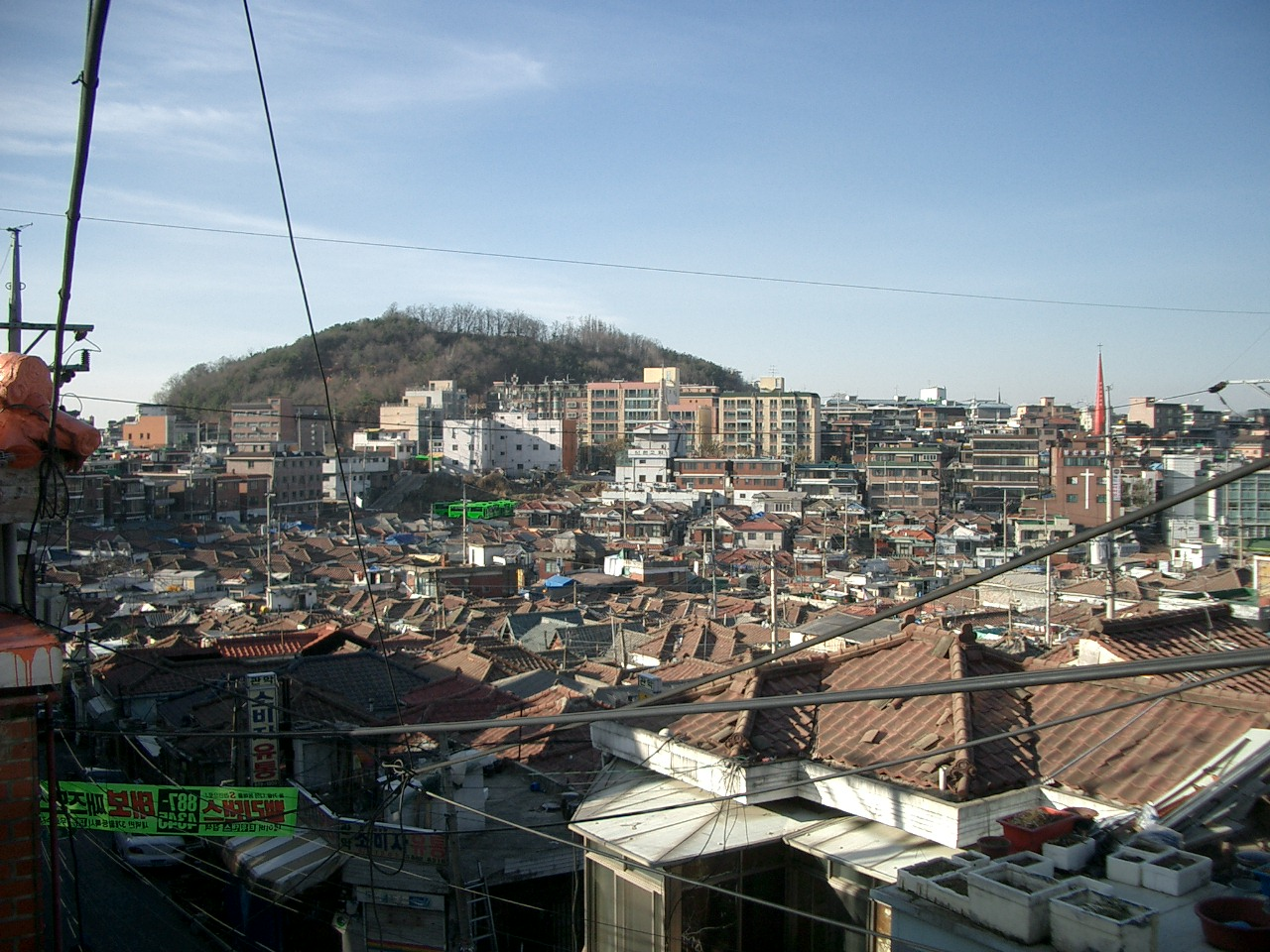
- Interactive map of Bongcheon-dong
- Country: South Korea

Area
  - Total: 8.16 km^{2} (3.15 sq mi)

Population (2001)
  - Total: 217,353
  - Density: 26,636/km^{2} (68,990/sq mi)

Korean name
- Hangul: 봉천동
- Hanja: 奉天洞
- RR: Bongcheon-dong
- MR: Pongch'ŏn-dong

Bongcheon-dong (Korean: 봉천동) is a statutory division of Gwanak District, Seoul, South Korea. Its name means "enshrining heaven" which was derived from its location, northern skirt of Mt. Gwanak, stretching to the mountain ridge. It consists of 9 administrative neighborhoods. The district office of Gwanak is located in Bongcheon.

== Administrative divisions ==
As of September 2008, there are 9 administrative neighborhoods (dong) in Bongcheon. "Bongsari" = Bongcheon Sageori

Name	Hangul	Hanja
Euncheon	은천	殷川
Seonghyeon	성현	成賢
Cheongnyong	청룡	靑龍
Boramae	보라매	No Chinese Characters notation
Cheongnim	청림	靑林
Haengun	행운	幸運
Nakseongdae	낙성대	落星垈
Jungang	중앙	中央
Inheon	인헌	仁憲

== In popular culture ==
The division is where the 2011 webtoon "Bongcheon-Dong Ghost" is set. It is also the home of Jang Geum-ja (Player 149) and Park Yong-sik (Player 007) in Squid Game (season 2).

== See also ==
- Administrative divisions of South Korea
