= Line 21 (Shenzhen Metro) =

Future Shenzhen Metro line

Overview
- Status: Under planning
- Locale: Shenzhen, Guangdong
- Termini: Aobei (Phase 1) Future: Qianbao; Longyuan (Phase 1) Future: Jikeng
- Stations: 6 (Phase 1)

Service
- Type: Rapid transit
- System: Shenzhen Metro
- Services: 1
- Operator(s): SZMC (Shenzhen Metro Group)

Technical
- Line length: 12.5km (Phase 1)
- Character: Underground
- Operating speed: 120km/h

Line 21 of the Shenzhen Metro is an express line under planning, which will connect across Shenzhen through the districts of Nanshan, Longhua and Longgang for 66 kilometers and 26 stations. The first phase of Line 21 originally entered Phase V planning in September 2022, and will run from Aobei to Longyuan in Longgang District, with 6 stations and 12.5 kilometers of track, however planning has been put on hold since 31 March 2023. The line is proposed to use 8 car type A trains.

== Stations (Phase 1) ==
Station name		Connections	Location
English	Chinese	Connections	Location
Aobei	坳背	14	Longgang
Universiade University Town	大运大学城		Longgang
Universiade North	大运北		Longgang
Huanggekeng	黄阁坑	10 16	Longgang
Longcheng	龙城		Longgang
Longyuan	龙园	16	Longgang
