= Yanzihu station =

Shenzhen Metro Line 16 station

Yanzihu 燕子湖
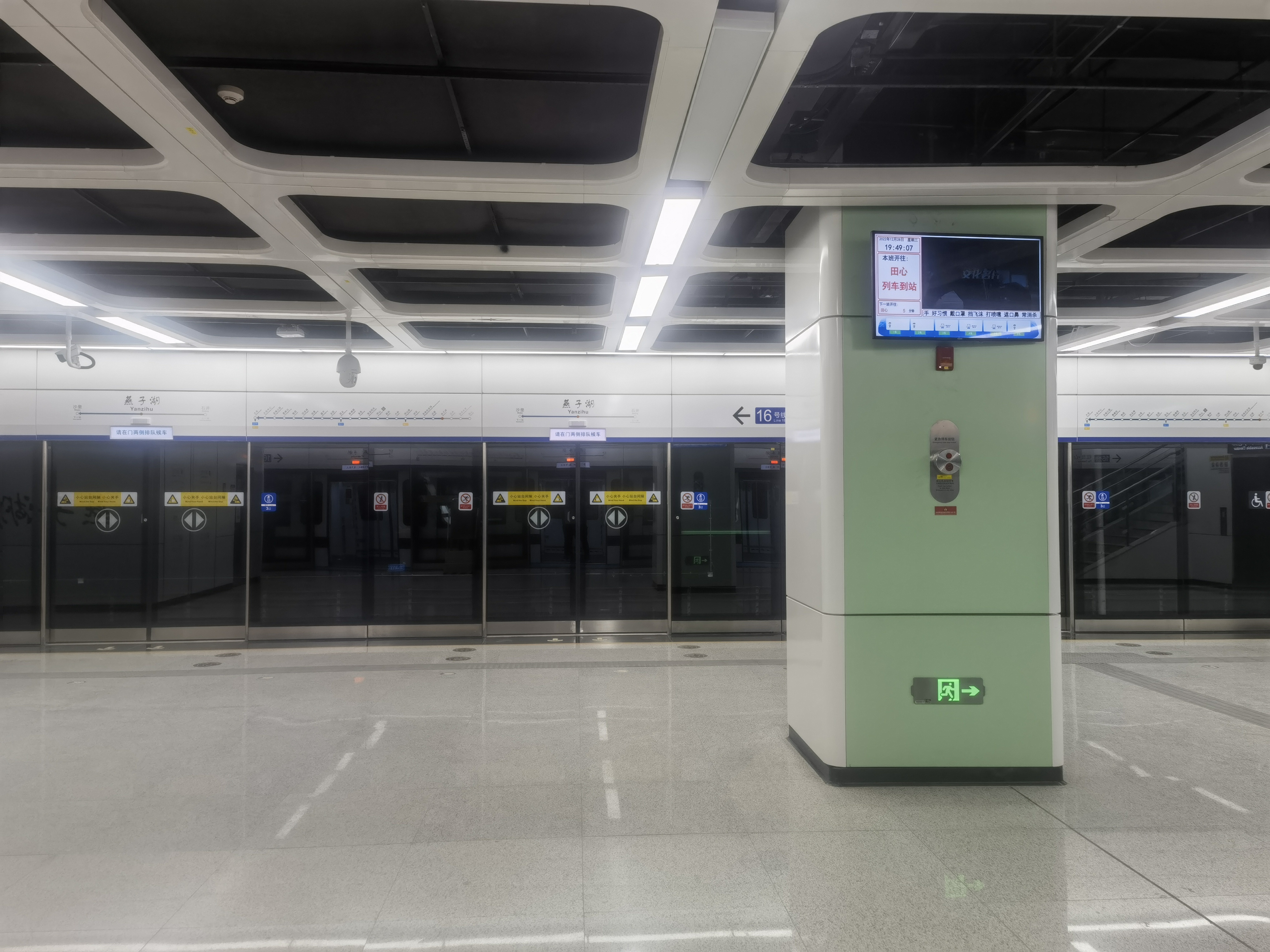
- Platform

Chinese name
- Chinese: 燕子湖
Transcriptions
Standard Mandarin
- Hanyu Pinyin: Yànzǐhú
Yue: Cantonese
- Yale Romanization: Yinzíwù
- Jyutping: Jin3 Zi2 Wu4

General information
- Location: Intersection of Dongzong Road and Shangjing Road (under planning); Maluan Subdistrict, Pingshan District, Shenzhen, Guangdong; China
- Coordinates: 22°41′27.49″N 114°22′13.26″E
- Operated by: SZMC (Shenzhen Metro Group)
- Line: Line 16
- Platforms: 2 (1 island platform)
- Tracks: 2

Construction
- Structure type: Underground
- Accessible: Yes

History
- Opened: 28 December 2022; 2 years ago

Services
Preceding station	Shenzhen Metro	Following station
Shabo towards Yuanshan Xikeng	Line 16	Shijing towards Tianxin
Location

Yanzihu station (Chinese: 燕子湖; pinyin: Yànzǐhú; Cantonese Yale: Yinzíwù) is a station on Line 16 of Shenzhen Metro. It opened on 28 December 2022.

== Station layout ==
The station has an island platform under Dongzong Road.

G	-	Exits A-D
B1F; Concourse	Lobby	Ticket Machines, Customer Service, Automatic Vending Machines
B2F; Platforms	Platform	16 towards Yuanshan Xikeng (Shabo)
B2F; Platforms	Island platform, doors will open on the left
B2F; Platforms	Platform	16 towards Tianxin (Shijing)

== Exits ==
Exit	Destination
Exit A	Dongzong Road (S), Maluan Police Station
Exit B	Dongzong Road (S), Pingshan 2nd Primary School
Exit C	Dongzong Road (N), Shijing Community Health Service Center
Exit D	Dongzong Road (N), The Party School of the Pingshan District Committee of the Chinese Communist Party, Shenzhen Pingshan District Swallow Lake International Convention and Exhibition Center, Grand Skylight International Hotel in Pingshan
