= Universiade Center station =

Shenzhen Metro Line 16 station

Universiade Center 大运中心
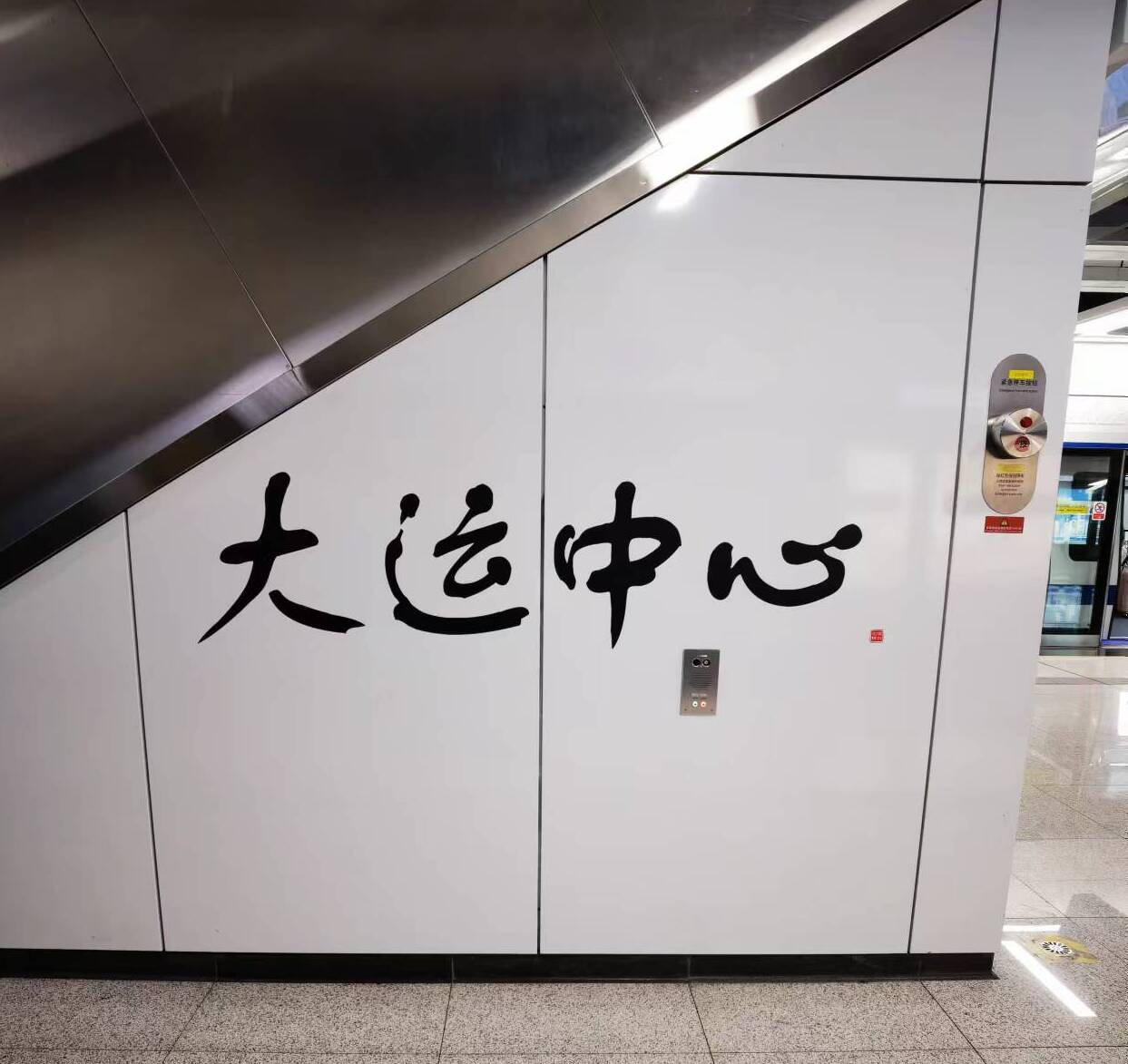
- Calligraphy

Chinese name
- Traditional Chinese: 大運中心
- Simplified Chinese: 大运中心
Transcriptions
Standard Mandarin
- Hanyu Pinyin: Dàyùn Zhōngxīn
Yue: Cantonese
- Yale Romanization: Daaihwahn Jūngsām
- Jyutping: Daai6 Wan6 Zung1 Sam1

General information
- Location: Northwest side of the intersection of Longxiang Boulevard and Huangge Road; Longcheng Subdistrict, Longgang District, Shenzhen, Guangdong; China
- Coordinates: 22°41′59.03″N 114°12′51.16″E
- Operated by: SZMC (Shenzhen Metro Group)
- Line: Line 16
- Platforms: 2 (1 island platform)
- Tracks: 2

Construction
- Structure type: Underground
- Accessible: Yes

History
- Opened: 28 December 2022; 3 years ago

Services
Preceding station	Shenzhen Metro	Following station
Universiade towards Yuanshan Xikeng	Line 16	Longcheng Park towards Tianxin
Location

Universiade Center station (simplified Chinese: 大运中心; traditional Chinese: 大運中心; pinyin: Dàyùn Zhōngxīn; Cantonese Yale: Daaihwahn Jūngsām) is a station on Line 16 of Shenzhen Metro. It opened on 28 December 2022.

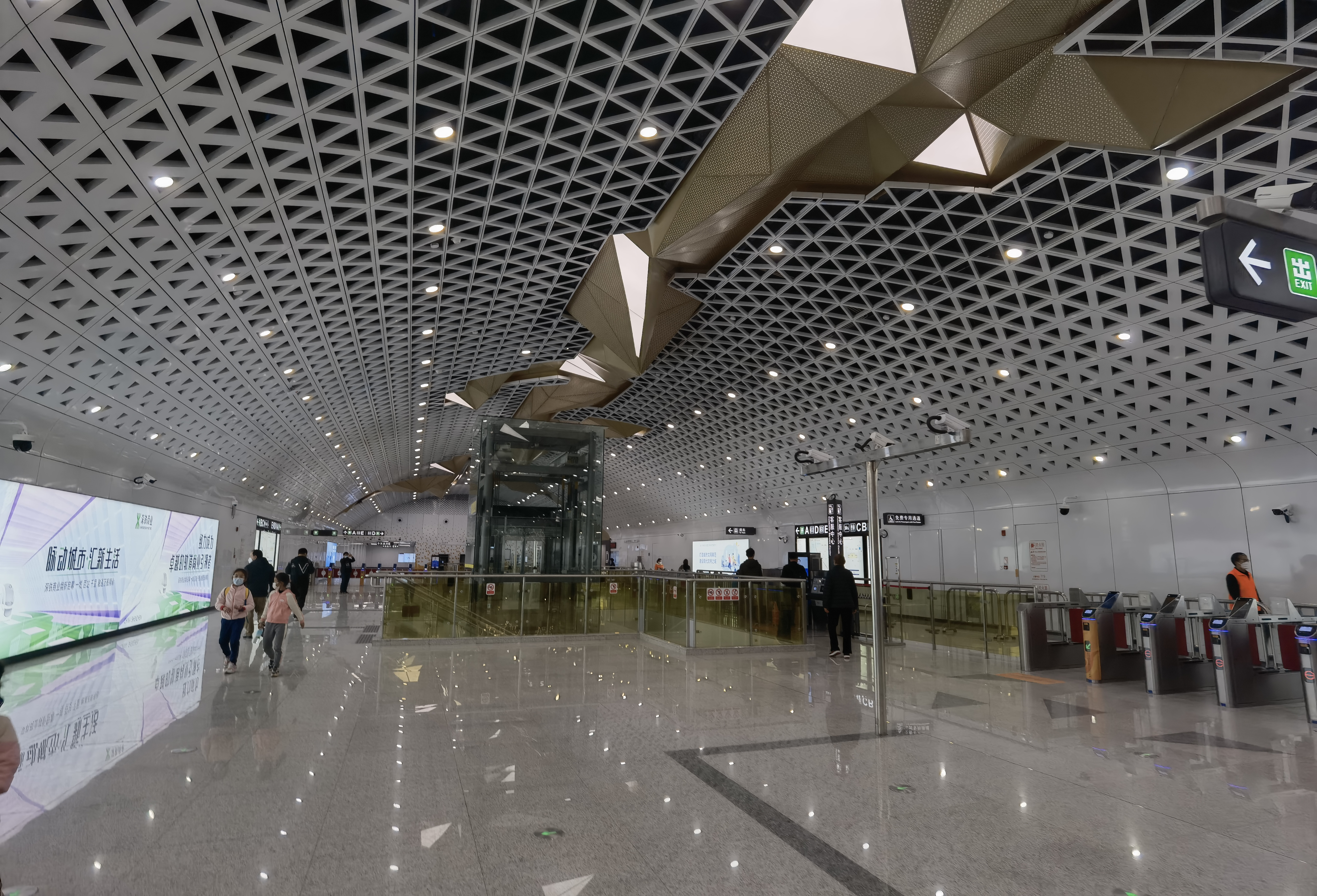
Concourse

== Station layout ==
The station has an island platform under Huangge Road.

G	-	Exits A-D
B1F; Concourse	Lobby	Ticket Machines, Customer Service, Automatic Vending Machines
B2F; Platforms	Platform	16 towards Yuanshan Xikeng (Universiade)
B2F; Platforms	Island platform, doors will open on the left
B2F; Platforms	Platform	16 towards Tianxin (Longcheng Park)

== Exits ==
Exit		Destination
Exit A	A1	Longxiang Boulevard (E), Jianxin Village, Galaxy Times, Taichung Industrial Zone, Vienna International Hotel
Exit A	A2	Longxiang Boulevard (W), City Cube International Children's Center, Jinshun Pioneer Park, Huihe Building
Exit B		Huangge Road (N), LVGEM Grand Mansion, Shenzhen Longgang District Foreign Chinese School
Exit C		Huangge Road (S), Shenzhen Universiade Sports Centre
Exit D		Longxiang Boulevard (E), Shenzhen Information Vocational and Technical College, Longgang Universiade School affiliated to South China Normal University

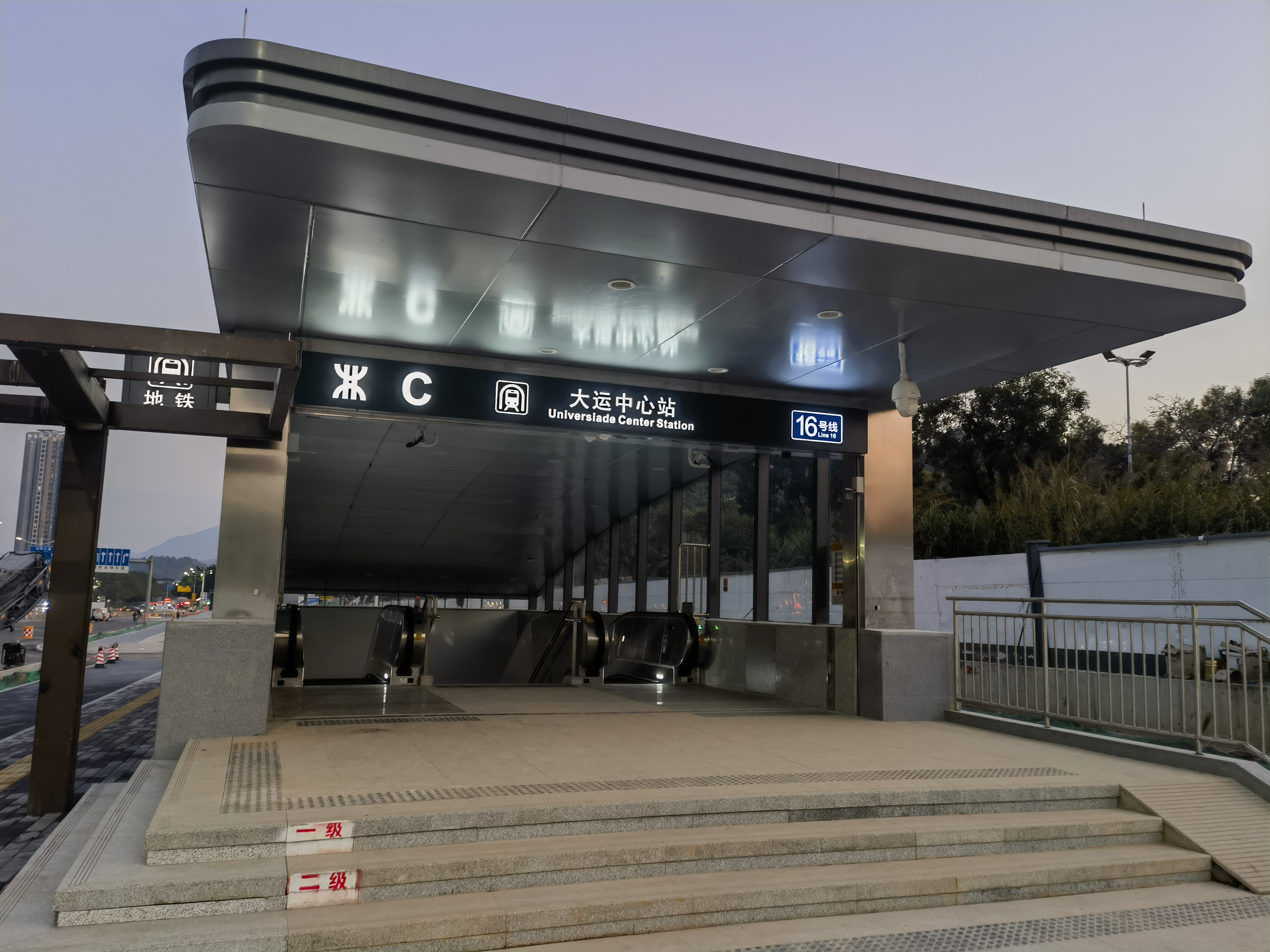
Entrance C

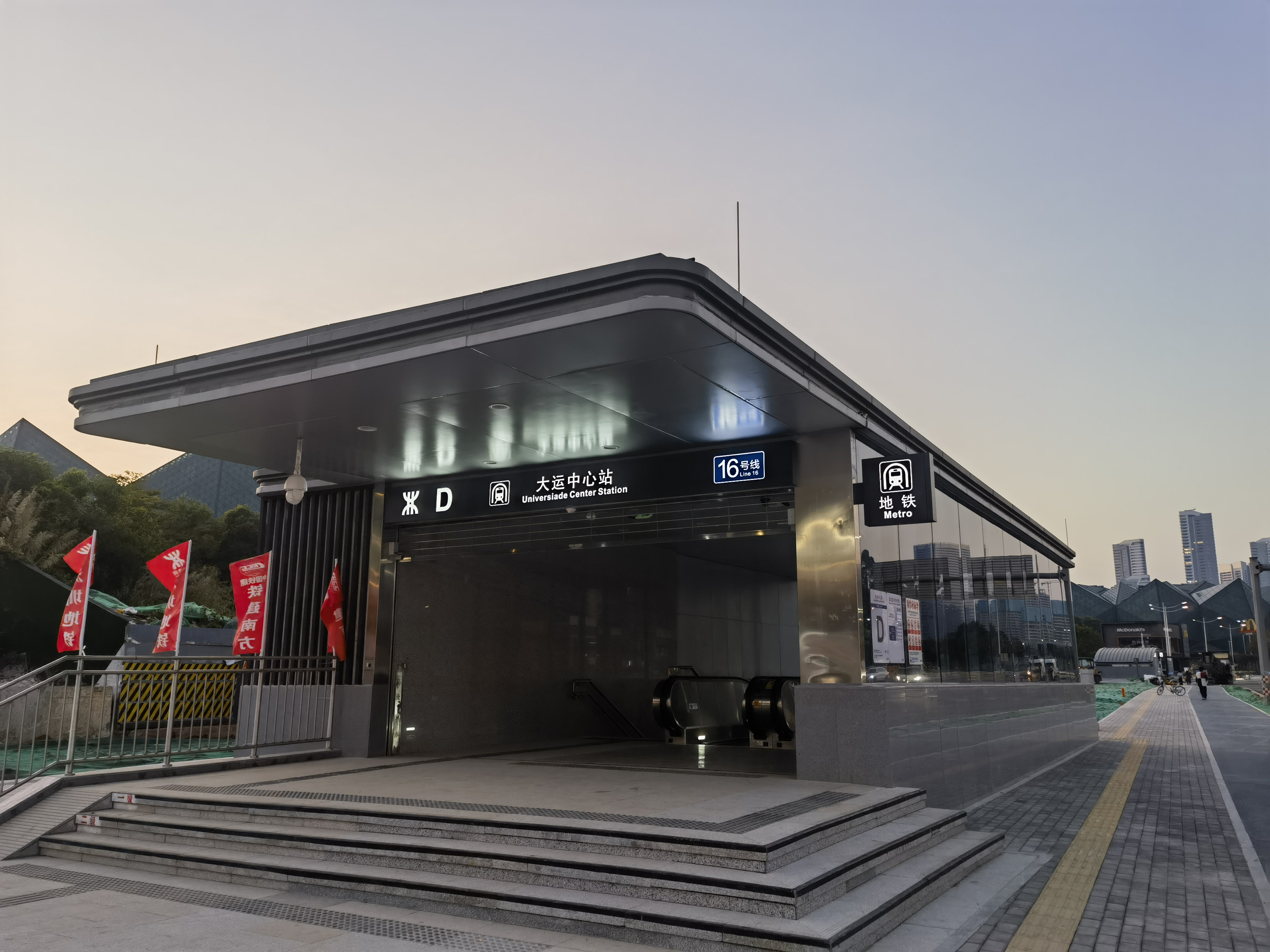
Entrance D
