= Shabo station =

Shenzhen Metro Line 16 station

Shabo 沙壆
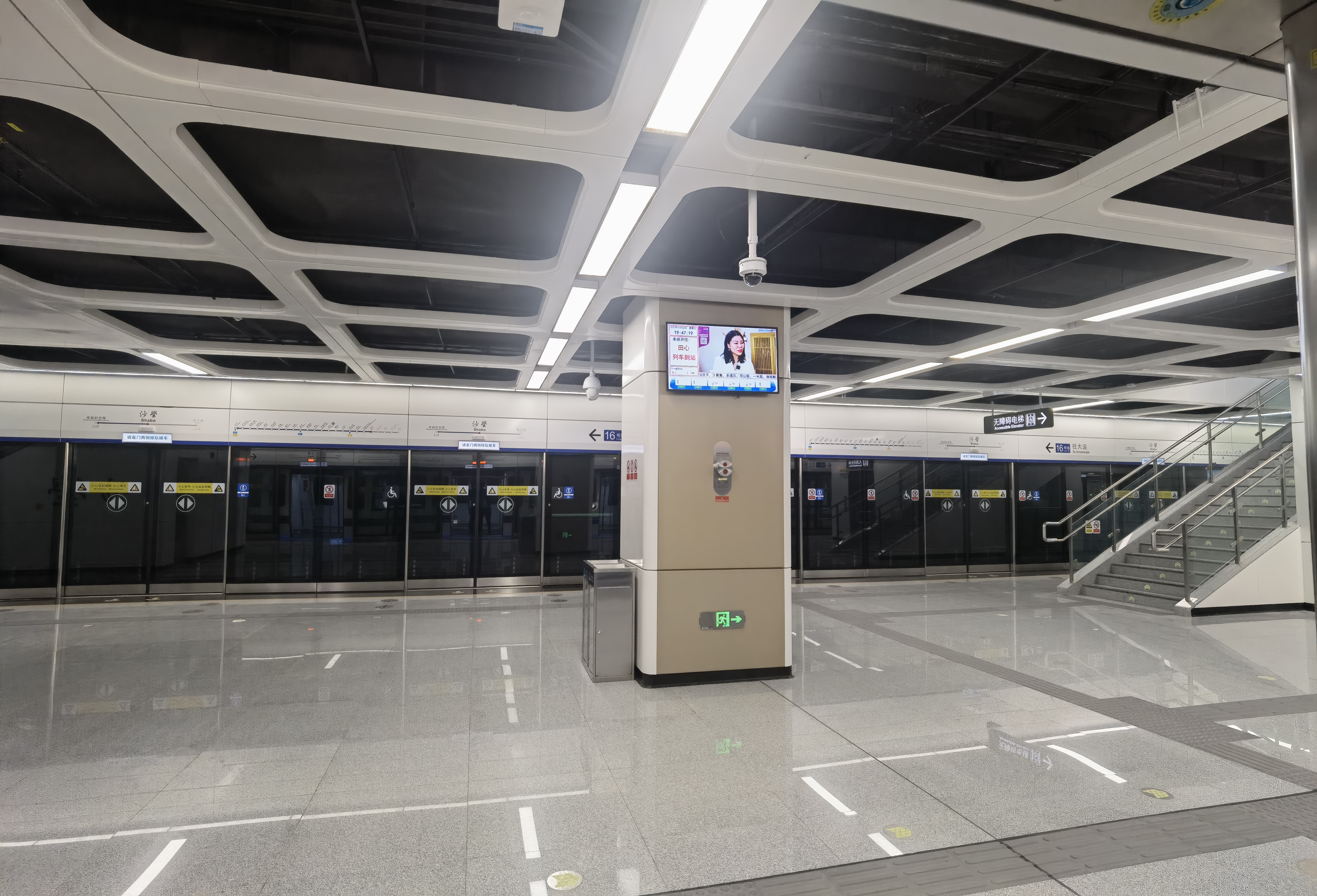
- Platform

Chinese name
- Chinese: 沙壆
Transcriptions
Standard Mandarin
- Hanyu Pinyin: Shābó
Yue: Cantonese
- Yale Romanization: Sāabok
- Jyutping: Saa1 Bok3

General information
- Location: Intersection of Dongzong Road and Shaxin Road; Maluan Subdistrict, Pingshan District, Shenzhen, Guangdong; China
- Coordinates: 22°41′20.58″N 114°21′35.32″E
- Operated by: SZMC (Shenzhen Metro Group)
- Line: Line 16
- Platforms: 2 (1 island platform)
- Tracks: 2

Construction
- Structure type: Underground
- Accessible: Yes

History
- Opened: 28 December 2022; 2 years ago

Services
Preceding station	Shenzhen Metro	Following station
Dongjiang Column Memorial Hall towards Yuanshan Xikeng	Line 16	Yanzihu towards Tianxin
Location

Shabo station (Chinese: 沙壆; pinyin: Shābó; Cantonese Yale: Sāabok) is a station on Line 16 of Shenzhen Metro. It opened on 28 December 2022.

== Station layout ==
The station has an island platform under Dongzong Road.

G	-	Exits A-D
B1F; Concourse	Lobby	Ticket Machines, Customer Service, Automatic Vending Machines
B2F; Platforms	Platform	16 towards Yuanshan Xikeng (Dongjiang Column Memorial Hall)
B2F; Platforms	Island platform, doors will open on the left
B2F; Platforms	Platform	16 towards Tianxin (Yanzihu)

== Exits ==
Exit	Destination
Exit A	Dongzong Road (S), Shenzhen Stomatological Hospital of Southern Medical University, Tax Service Department of Pingshan District Taxation Bureau of Shenzhen, Veteran Cadres Activity Center of Pingshan District, High School Attached to Northeast Normal University
Exit B	Dongzong Road (S), Shenzhen Pingshan Dongzong Primary School, Xincun Community, Pingshan District People's Hospital, Shali Community Health Service Center at Pingshan District People's Hospital
Exit C	Dongzong Road (N), Furun Leting, Longxiang School, Shenzhen Pingshan Swallow Lake (Yanzihu) International Convention and Exhibition Center
Exit D	Dongzong Road (N), Boming School, Dingsheng Industrial Park
