= Shengping station =

Shenzhen Metro Line 16 station

Shengping 盛平
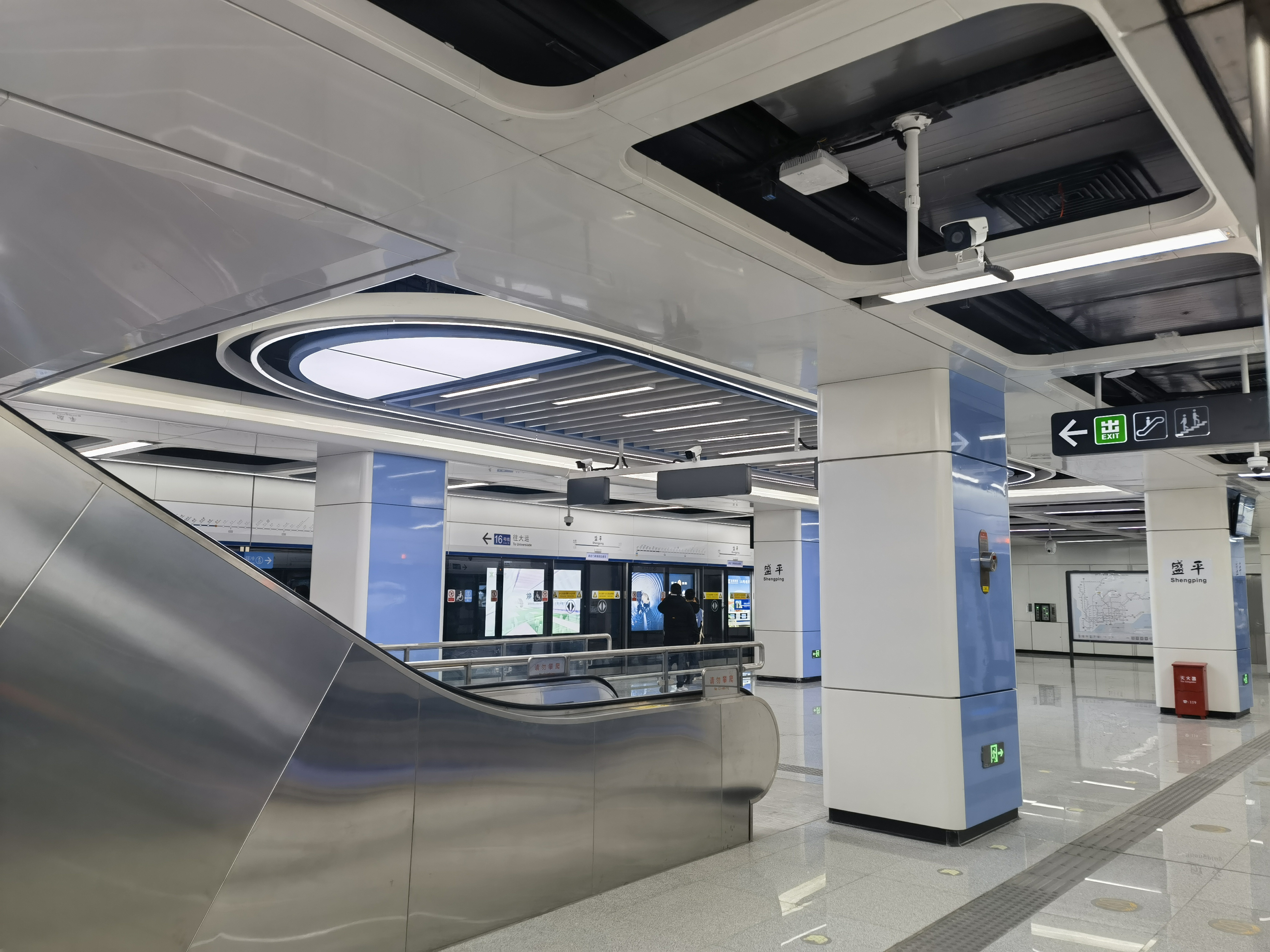
- Platform

Chinese name
- Chinese: 盛平
Transcriptions
Standard Mandarin
- Hanyu Pinyin: Shèngpíng
Yue: Cantonese
- Yale Romanization: Sihngpìhng
- Jyutping: Sing6 Ping4

General information
- Location: Intersection of Longping West Road, Longping East Road and Longcheng Boulevard; Longcheng Subdistrict, Longgang District, Shenzhen, Guangdong; China
- Coordinates: 22°43′58.12″N 114°14′34.40″E
- Operated by: SZMC (Shenzhen Metro Group)
- Line: Line 16
- Platforms: 2 (1 island platform)
- Tracks: 2

Construction
- Structure type: Underground
- Accessible: Yes

History
- Opened: 28 December 2022; 3 years ago

Services
| Preceding station | Shenzhen Metro | Following station |
|---|---|---|
| Shangjing towards Yuanshan Xikeng | Line 16 | Longyuan towards Tianxin |
Location

Shengping station (Chinese: 盛平; pinyin: Shèngpíng; Cantonese Yale: Sihngpìhng) is a station on Line 16 of Shenzhen Metro. It opened on 28 December 2022.

== Station layout ==
The station has an island platform under Longping West Road and Longping East Road.

| G | - | Exits A-D |
| B1F; Concourse | Lobby | Ticket Machines, Customer Service, Automatic Vending Machines |
| B2F; Platforms | Platform | 16 towards Yuanshan Xikeng (Shangjing) |
| B2F; Platforms | Island platform, doors will open on the left |
| B2F; Platforms | Platform | 16 towards Tianxin (Longyuan) |

== Exits ==
| Exit | Destination |
|---|---|
| Exit A | Longping West Road (S), Extraordinary Space, Shangjing Xinyuan, Xingtai Experimental School, and Chengjian Imperial Palace |
| Exit B | Longping West Road (E), Sunshine Plaza, Huilong World, Yulong Garden, Shengping Primary School, Shengping Kindergarten, Shenglong Garden |
| Exit C | Longping West Road (N), Haowanjia Building Materials Market, Xinlonggang Garden, Xinyuan Road, Chufeng Commercial Plaza, Guowei New Estate, Longsheng School, Guanxinhe Residents Group |
| Exit D | Longping West Road (W), New Quansheng Hotel, Longgang Liyuan Building, Lychee Garden, Zhida Industrial Park, Penglitai Industrial Park, Yuelan Mountain Garden, Quanlongsheng Building, Longgang Urban Management Bureau |

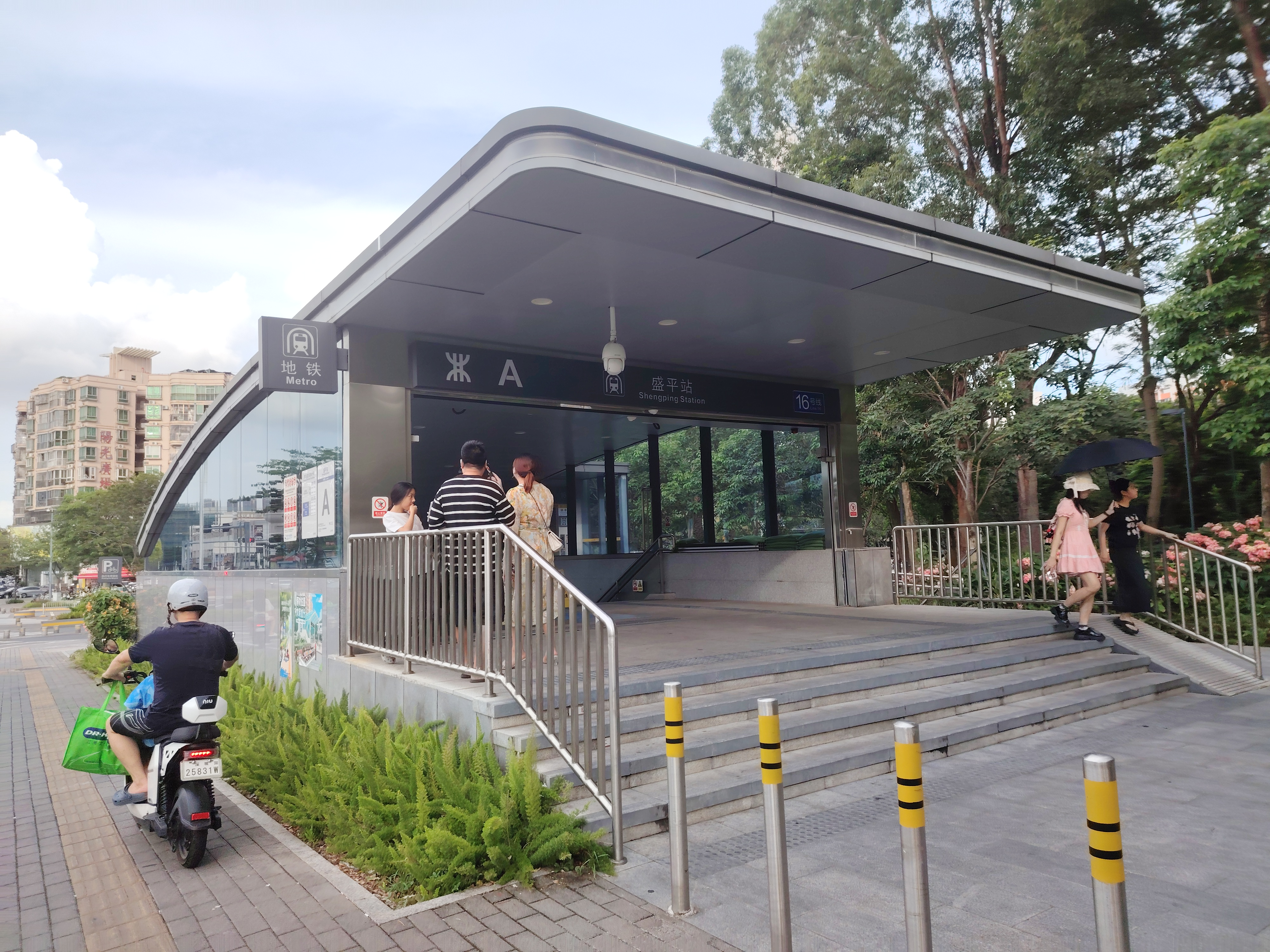
Entrance A
