= Huanggekeng station =

Shenzhen Metro Line 16 station

Huanggekeng 黄阁坑
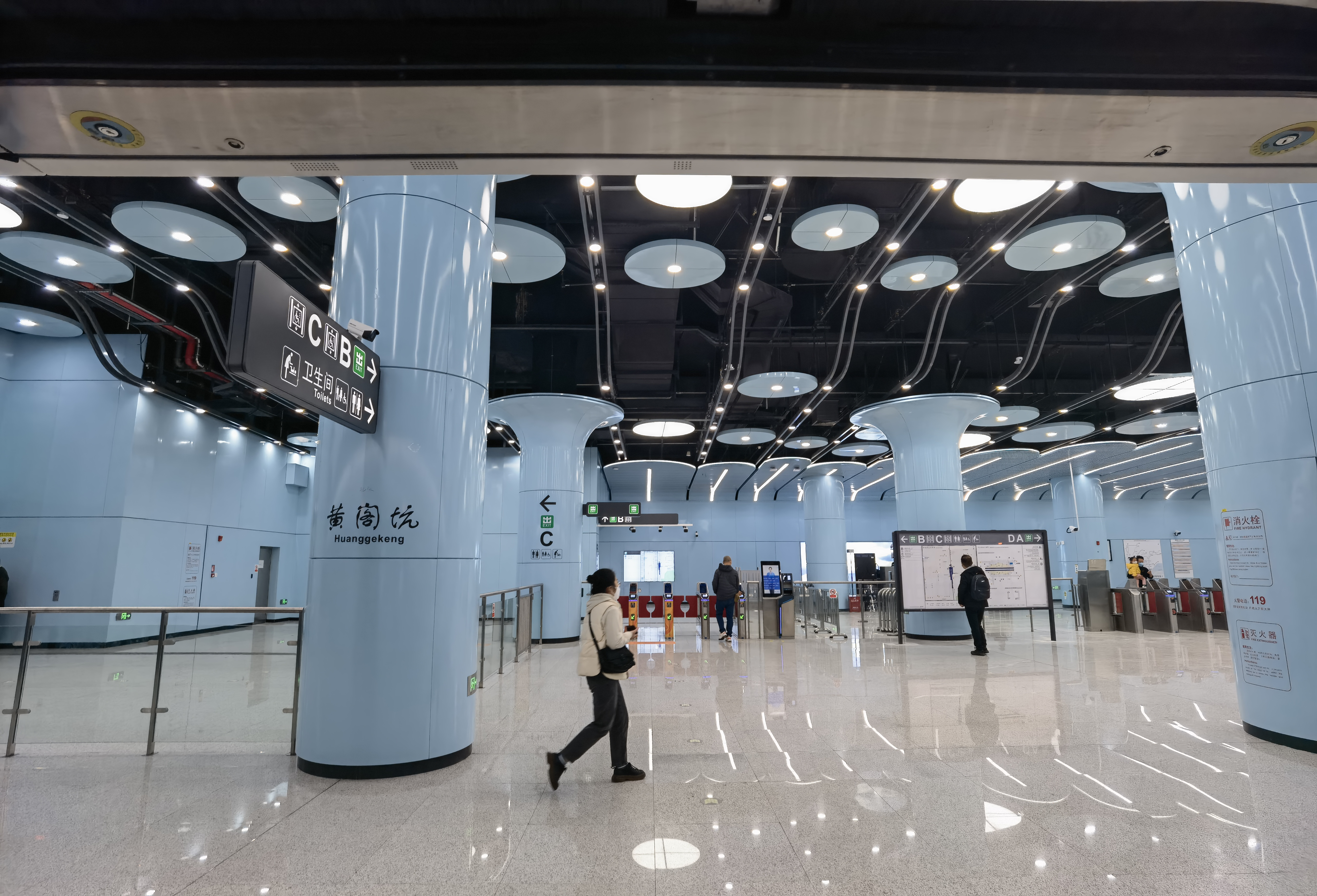
- Platform (towards Tianxin)

Chinese name
- Traditional Chinese: 黃閣坑
- Simplified Chinese: 黃阁坑
Transcriptions
Standard Mandarin
- Hanyu Pinyin: Huánggé Kēng
Yue: Cantonese
- Yale Romanization: Wòhnggok Hāang
- Jyutping: Wong4 Gok3 Haang1

General information
- Location: Intersection of Huangge Road and Qinglin Road; Longcheng Subdistrict, Longgang District, Shenzhen, Guangdong; China
- Coordinates: 22°43′11.71″N 114°12′48.49″E
- Operated by: SZMC (Shenzhen Metro Group)
- Line: Line 16
- Platforms: 2 (2 side platforms)
- Tracks: 2

Construction
- Structure type: Underground
- Accessible: Yes

History
- Opened: 28 December 2022; 3 years ago

Services
Preceding station	Shenzhen Metro	Following station
Longcheng Park towards Yuanshan Xikeng	Line 16	Yuyuan towards Tianxin
Location

Huanggekeng station (simplified Chinese: 黃阁坑; traditional Chinese: 黃閣坑; pinyin: Huánggé Kēng; Cantonese Yale: Wòhnggok Hāang) is a station on Line 16 of Shenzhen Metro. It opened on 28 December 2022. It is located in Longgang District at the junction of Huangge Road and Qinglin Road.

== Future development ==
The station is planned to have interchanges with Line 10 and Line 21, and will be the planned northern terminus of the former.

== Station layout ==
The station has 2 side platforms under Huangge Road.

G	-	Exits A-D
B1F; Mezzanine	-	Paid connecting passage between both sides of the platforms
B1F; Concourse & Platforms	North Lobby	Ticket Machines, Customer Service, Automatic Vending Machines, Toilets
B1F; Concourse & Platforms	Side platform, doors will open on the right
B1F; Concourse & Platforms	Platform	16 towards Yuanshan Xikeng (Longcheng Park)
B1F; Concourse & Platforms	Platform	16 towards Tianxin (Yuyuan)
B1F; Concourse & Platforms	Side platform, doors will open on the right
B1F; Concourse & Platforms	South Lobby	Ticket Machines, Customer Service, Automatic Vending Machines
B2F; Mezzanine	-	Unpaid connecting passage between both sides of the concourses

== Exits ==
Exit		Destination
Exit A	A1	Qinglin Road (S), Shenzhen Longgang Secondary Vocational School/Shenzhen Longgang Vocational and Technical School, Longgang Branch of the Party School of the Municipal Party Committee, Longgang District Education Bureau, Longgang District Water Affairs Bureau, Longgang Customs, Longcheng Park, Shenzhen Longgang District Teachers' Training School
Exit A	A2	Huangge Road (E), Shenzhen Longgang Secondary Vocational School/Shenzhen Longgang Vocational and Technical School, Shenzhen Open University (Longgang Branch)
Exit B		Huangge Road (E), Tianjian Modern City, Longgang District Otolaryngology Hospital, Longgang Fire and Rescue Brigade, Longgang Power Supply Bureau of China Southern Power Grid
Exit C		Huangge Road (W), Longgang Tian'an Cyber City
Exit D		Huangge Road (W), Guangdong Provincial Technician College (Shenzhen Campus), Dawei Industrial Zone

== Gallery ==
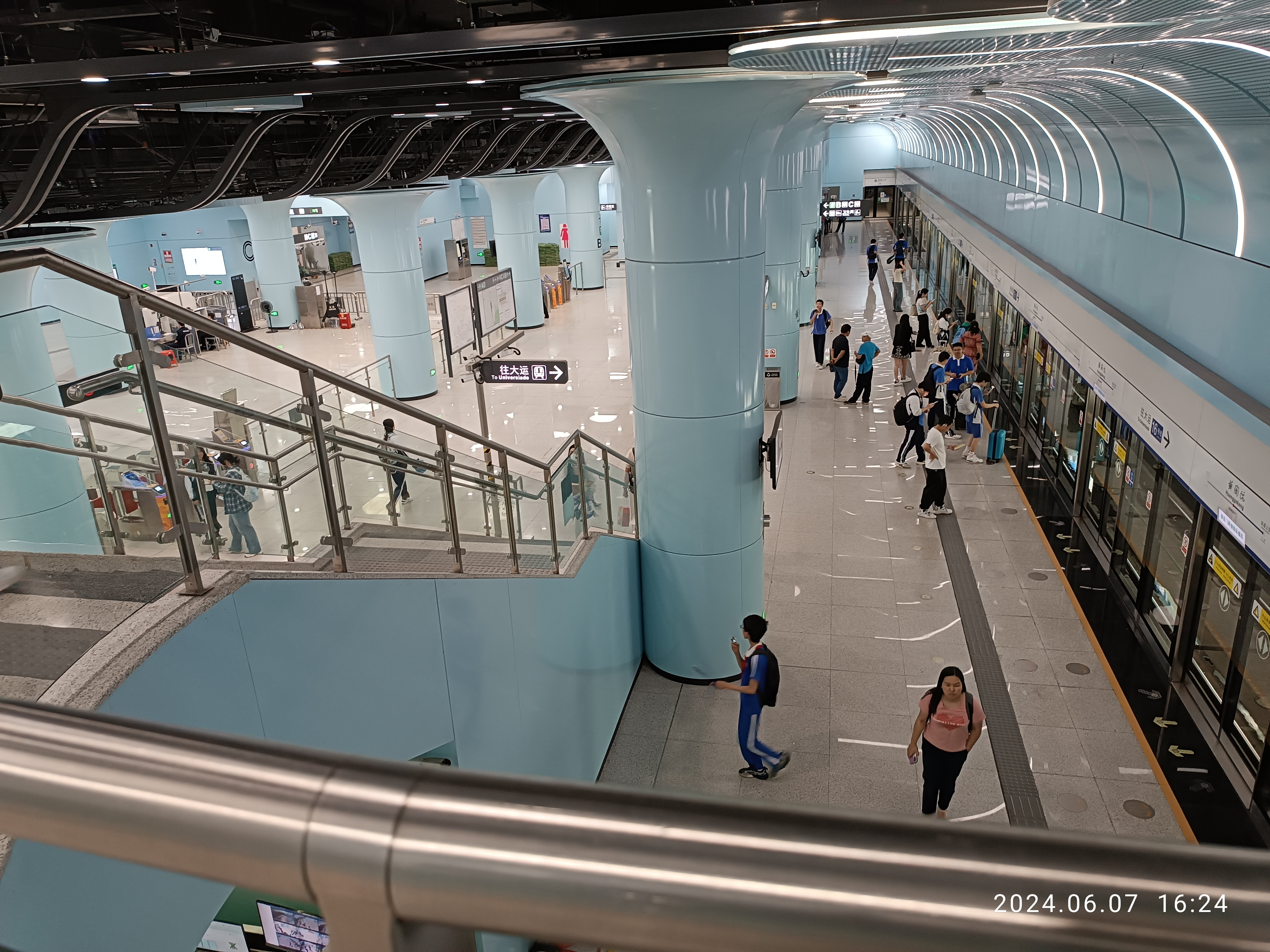
Mezzanine stairs looking down to Yuanshan Xikeng-bound platform

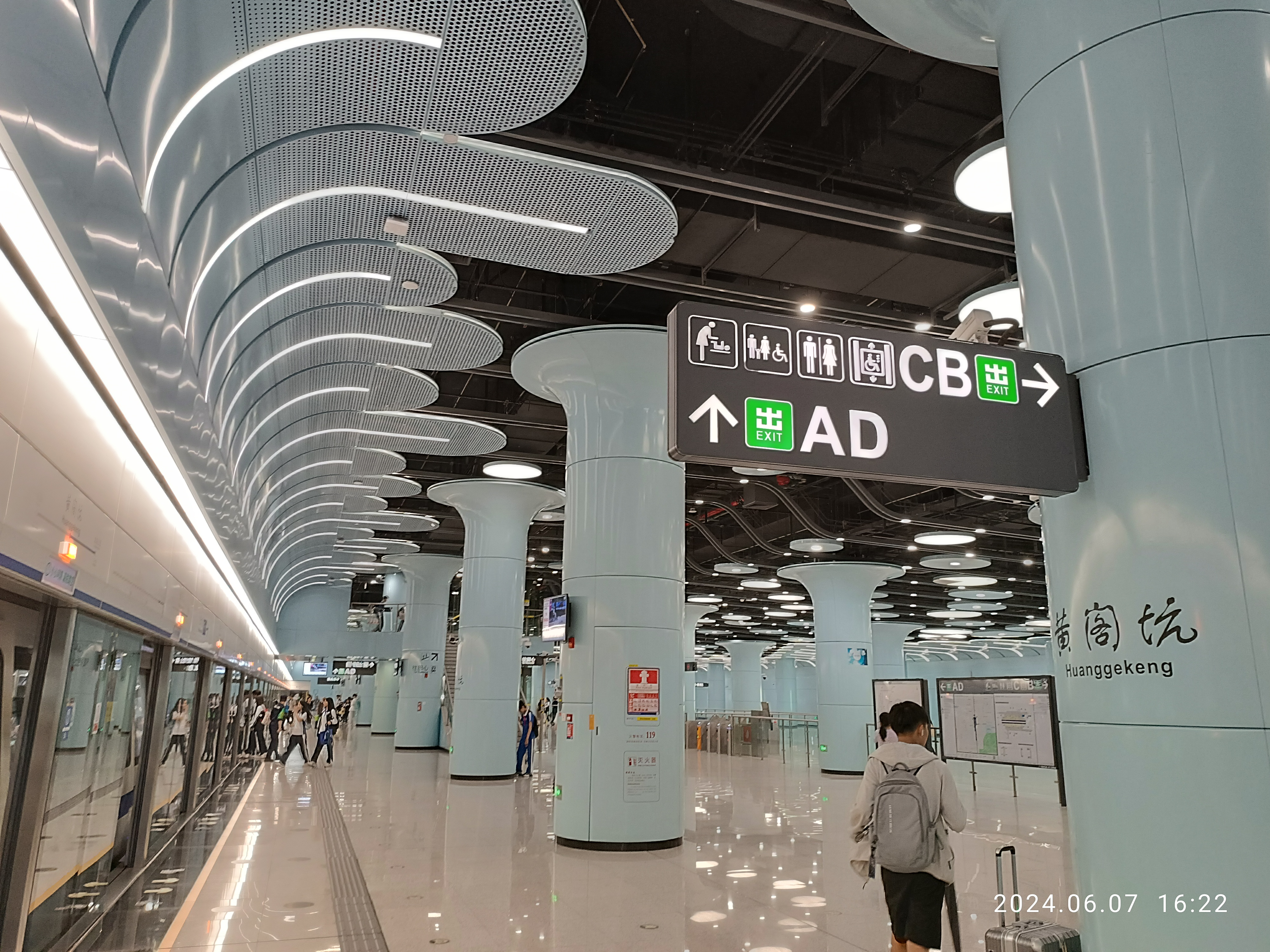
Platform (towards Yuanshan Xikeng)
