= Shangjing station =

Shenzhen Metro Line 16 station

Shangjing 尚景
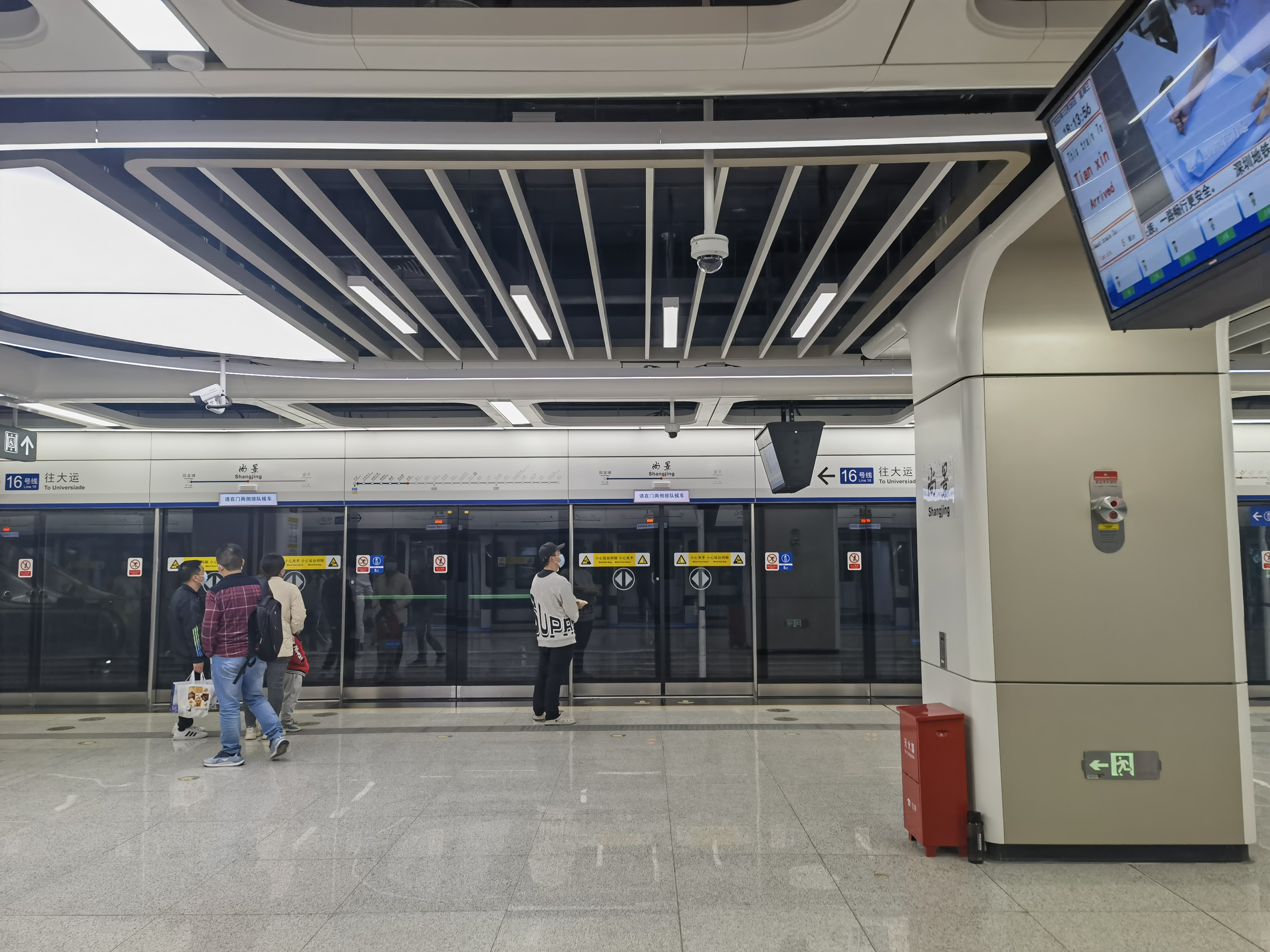
- Platform

Chinese name
- Chinese: 尚景
Transcriptions
Standard Mandarin
- Hanyu Pinyin: Shàngjǐng
Yue: Cantonese
- Yale Romanization: Seuhnggíng
- Jyutping: Soeng6 Ging2

General information
- Location: Intersection of Longping West Road and Changxing Road; Longcheng Subdistrict, Longgang District, Shenzhen, Guangdong; China
- Coordinates: 22°43′55.60″N 114°14′20.18″E
- Operated by: SZMC (Shenzhen Metro Group)
- Line: Line 16
- Platforms: 2 (1 island platform)
- Tracks: 2

Construction
- Structure type: Underground
- Accessible: Yes

History
- Opened: 28 December 2022; 3 years ago

Services
Preceding station	Shenzhen Metro	Following station
Huilongpu towards Yuanshan Xikeng	Line 16	Shengping towards Tianxin
Location

Shangjing station (Chinese: 尚景; pinyin: Shàngjǐng; Cantonese Yale: Seuhnggíng) is a station on Line 16 of Shenzhen Metro. It opened on 28 December 2022.

== Station layout ==
The station has an island platform under Longping West Road.

G	-	Exits A-D
B1F; Concourse	Lobby	Ticket Machines, Customer Service, Automatic Vending Machines
B2F; Platforms	Platform	16 towards Yuanshan Xikeng (Huilongpu)
B2F; Platforms	Island platform, doors will open on the left
B2F; Platforms	Platform	16 towards Tianxin (Shengping)

== Exits ==
Exit	Destination
Exit A	Longping West Road (S), Qinglin Primary School, Shangjing Huayuan, Shangjing Market, City Garden, Longtan Park
Exit B	Longping West Road (S), China Mobile Longgang Machine Building, Tianjian Garden, Tianjian County Town, Shangjing Garden
Exit C	Longping West Road (E), Tianji Yayuan, Le'anju Longgang Store, Shengping Police Station, Zhida Industrial Park, Yueshan Huafu, Shenye Zilin Mountain
Exit D	Longping West Road (N), Longgang District Planning and Land Supervision Bureau, Yuecheng Central, Xinyue Garden, Laowei New Estate, Huilongpu Park, Yuecheng Garden Kindergarten

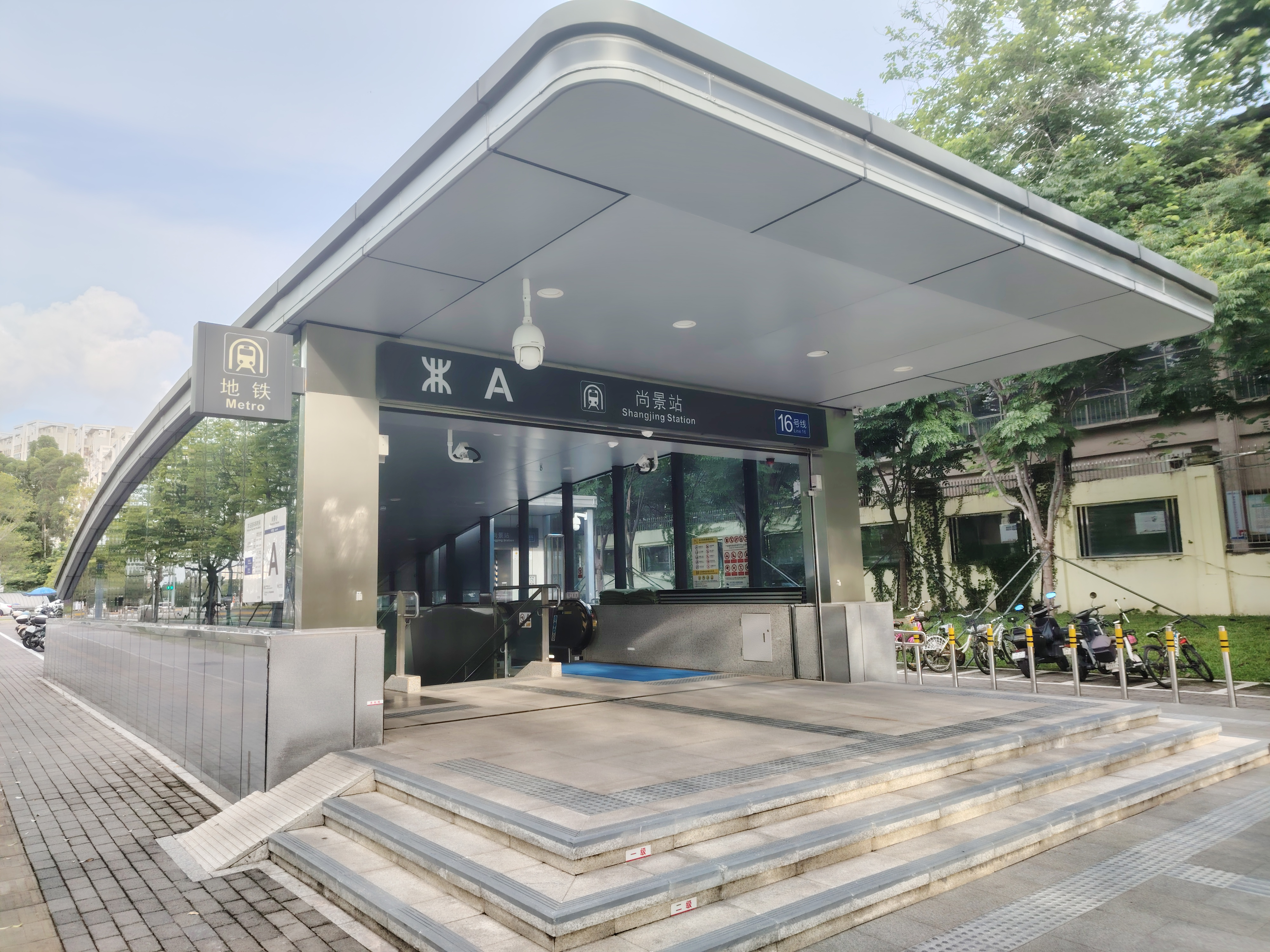
Entrance A
