= Yuyuan station =

Yuyuan station may refer to:

- Yuyuan Garden station, a Shanghai Metro station
- Yuyuan station (Shenzhen Metro), a Shenzhen Metro station
