= Huilongpu station =

Shenzhen Metro Line 16 station

Huilongpu 回龙埔
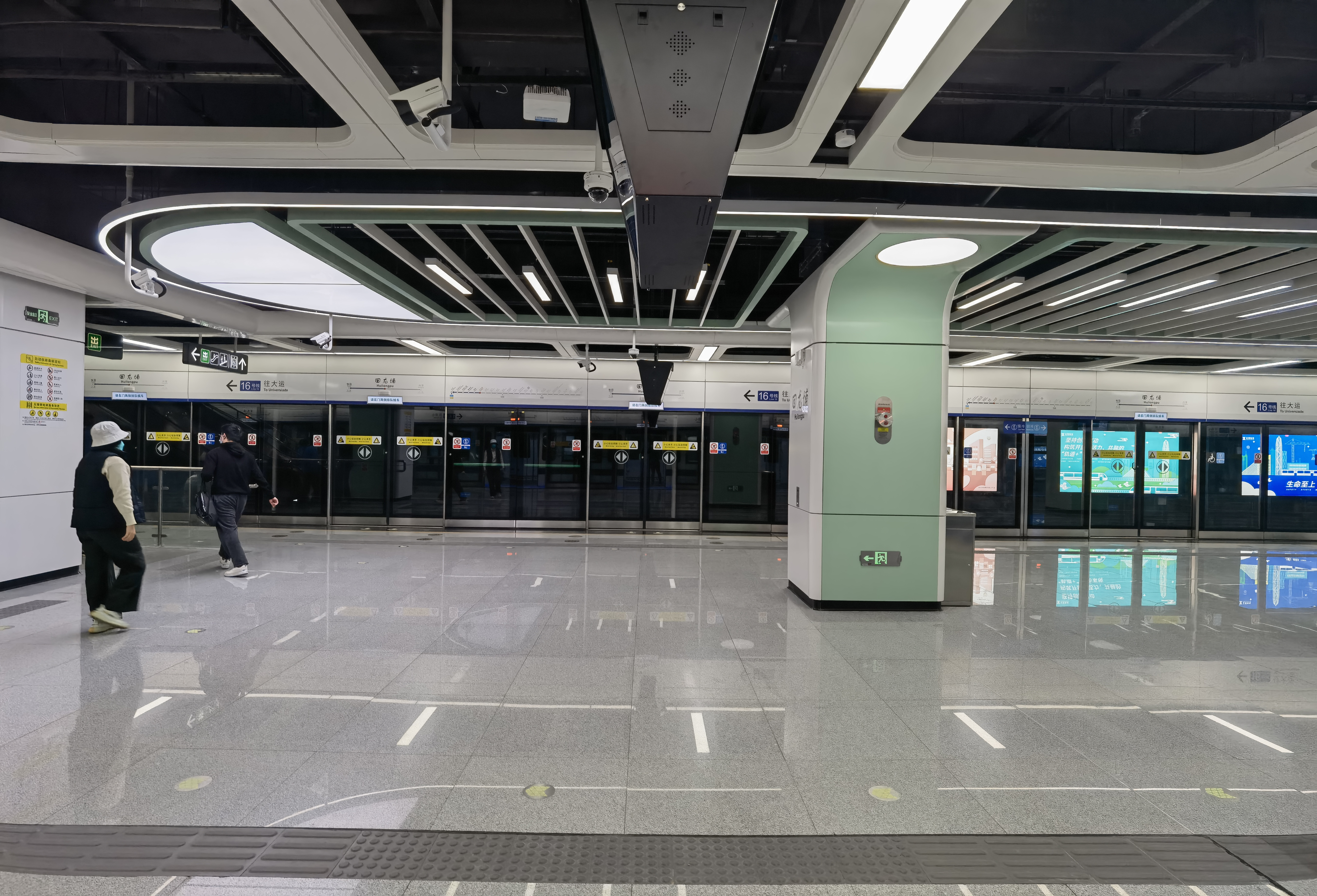
- Platform

Chinese name
- Traditional Chinese: 回龍埔
- Simplified Chinese: 回龙埔
Transcriptions
Standard Mandarin
- Hanyu Pinyin: Huílóngpǔ
Yue: Cantonese
- Yale Romanization: Wùihlùhngbou
- Jyutping: Wui4 Lung4 Bou3

General information
- Location: West of the intersection of Longping West Road and Jixiang Road; Longcheng Subdistrict, Longgang District, Shenzhen, Guangdong; China
- Coordinates: 22°43′54.88″N 114°13′51.74″E
- Operated by: SZMC (Shenzhen Metro Group)
- Line: Line 16
- Platforms: 2 (1 island platform)
- Tracks: 2

Construction
- Structure type: Underground
- Accessible: Yes

History
- Opened: 28 December 2022; 3 years ago

Services
Preceding station	Shenzhen Metro	Following station
Yuyuan towards Yuanshan Xikeng	Line 16	Shangjing towards Tianxin
Location

Huilongpu station (simplified Chinese: 回龙埔; traditional Chinese: 回龍埔; pinyin: Huílóngpǔ; Cantonese Yale: Wùihlùhngbou) is a station on Line 16 of Shenzhen Metro. It opened on 28 December 2022.

== Station layout ==
The station has an island platform under Longping West Road.

G	-	Exits A-D
B1F; Concourse	Lobby	Ticket Machines, Customer Service, Automatic Vending Machines
B2F; Platforms	Platform	16 towards Yuanshan Xikeng (Yuyuan)
B2F; Platforms	Island platform, doors will open on the left
B2F; Platforms	Platform	16 towards Tianxin (Shangjing)

== Exits ==
Exit	Destination
Exit A	Longping West Road (S), Tongxiang Road, Longgang District Maternal and Child Health Hospital, Ruihua Garden, Xihe Garden
Exit B	Longping West Road (S), Jixiang Middle Road, City Garden
Exit C	Longping West Road (N), Jixiang Middle Road, Yangtze River Garden, Huaye Rose County, Huilongpu Community Park, Quansheng Ziyue Dragon Garden, Tongchuang Jiuzhu
Exit D	Longping West Road (N), Huilongpu Kindergarten, Huilongpu Comprehensive Market, Longpu Road, Yanzhu Road, Aixin Road, Vanke Hanlin City

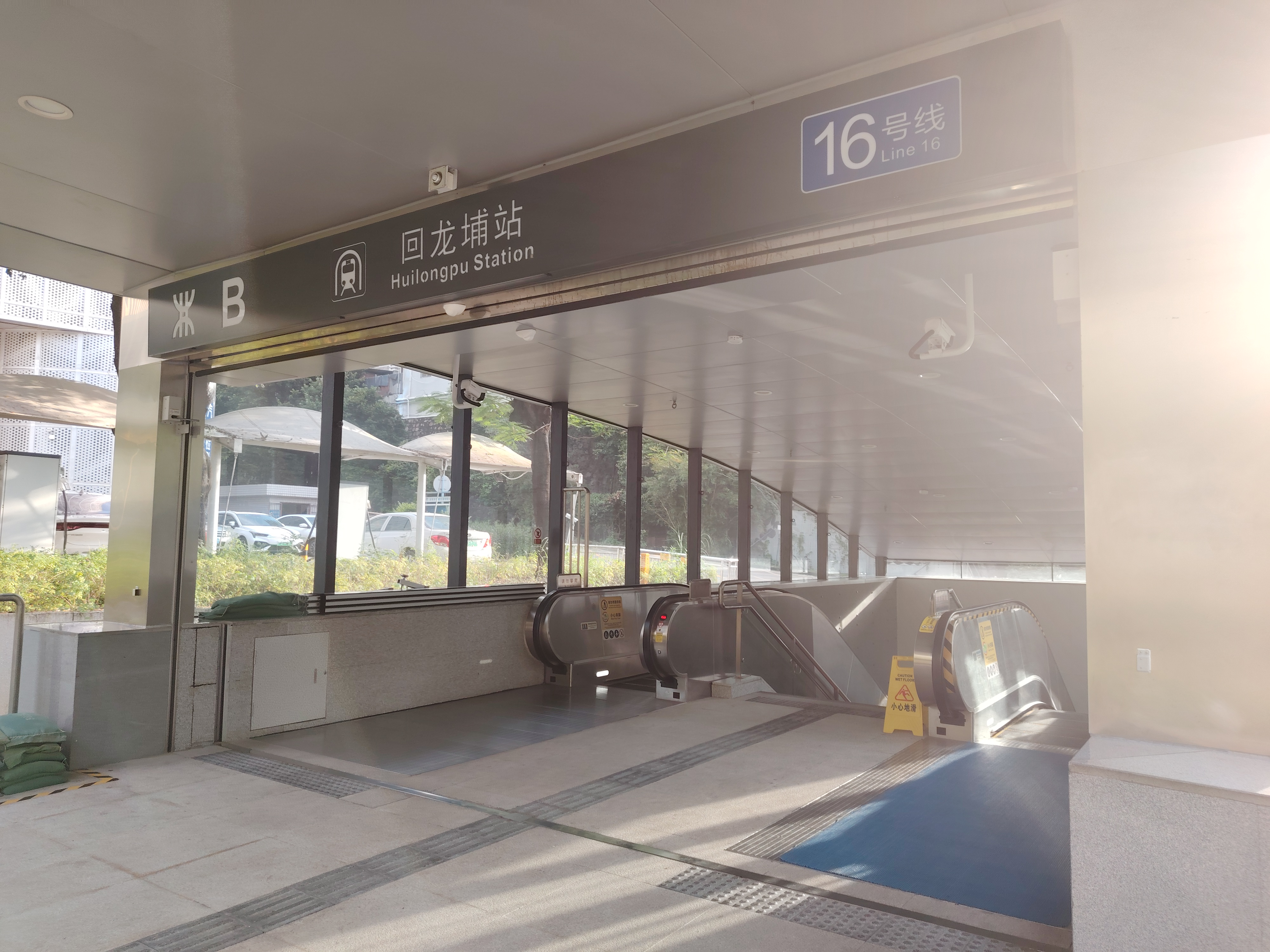
Entrance B

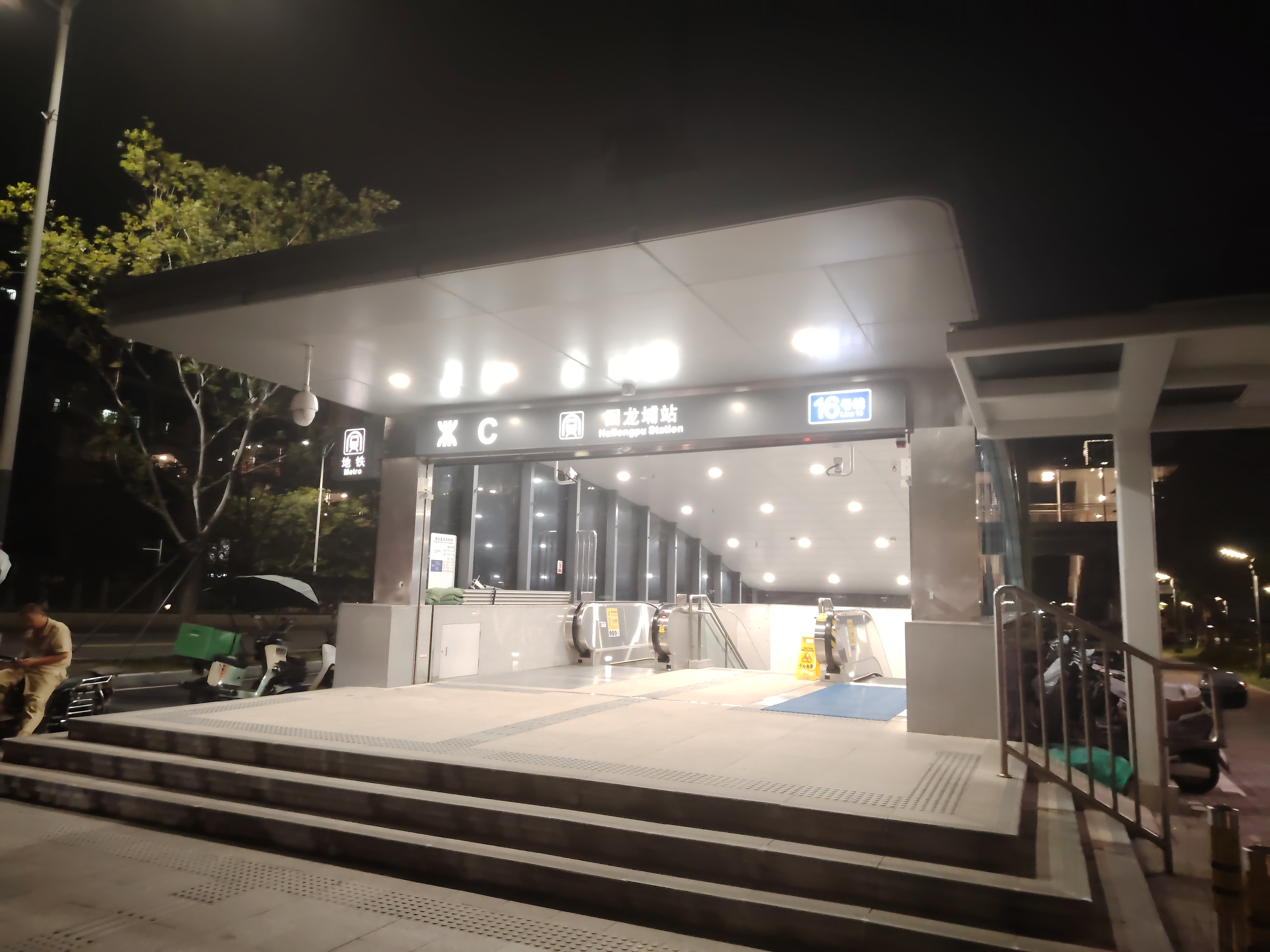
Entrance C

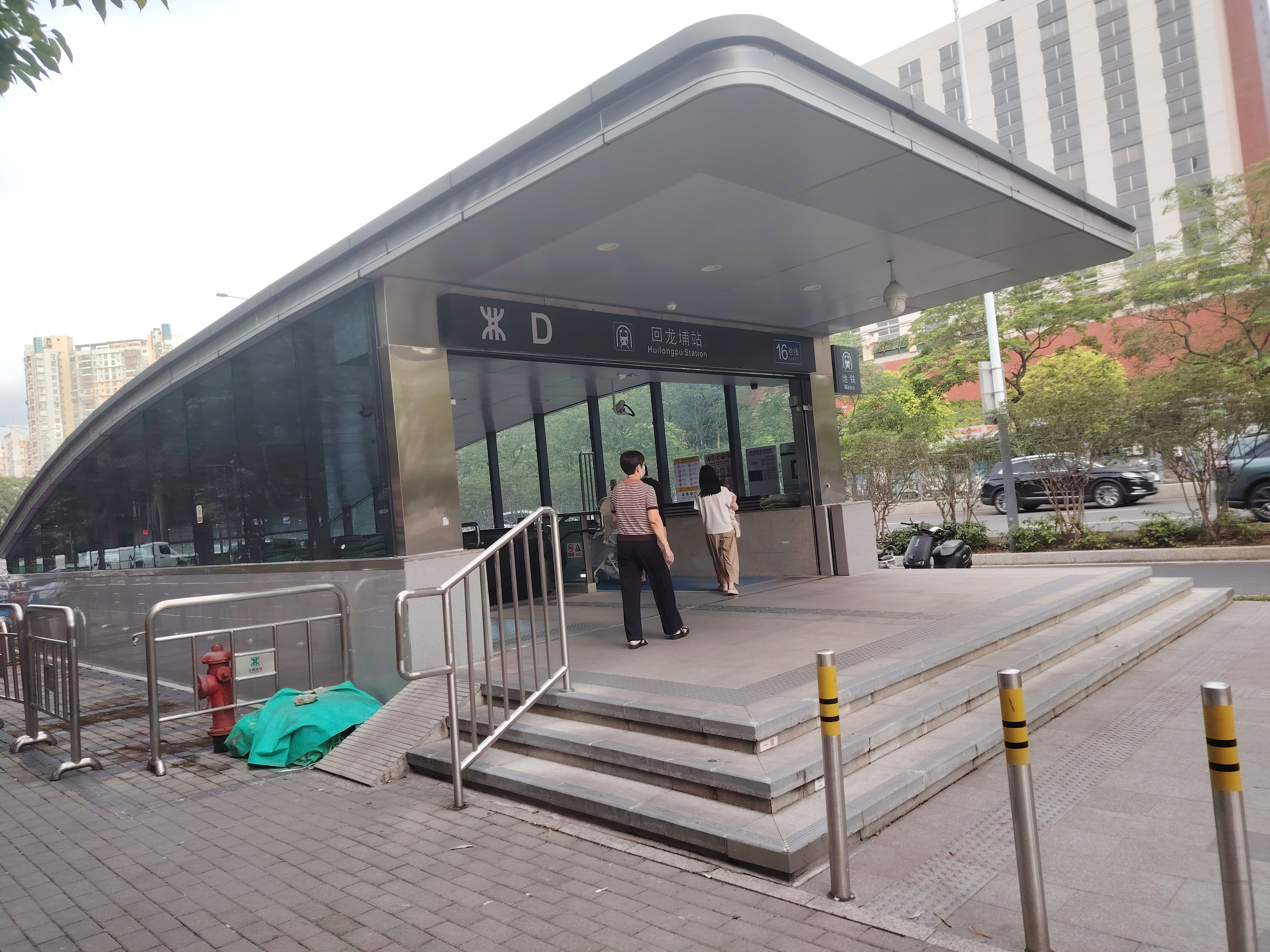
Entrance D

== Gallery ==
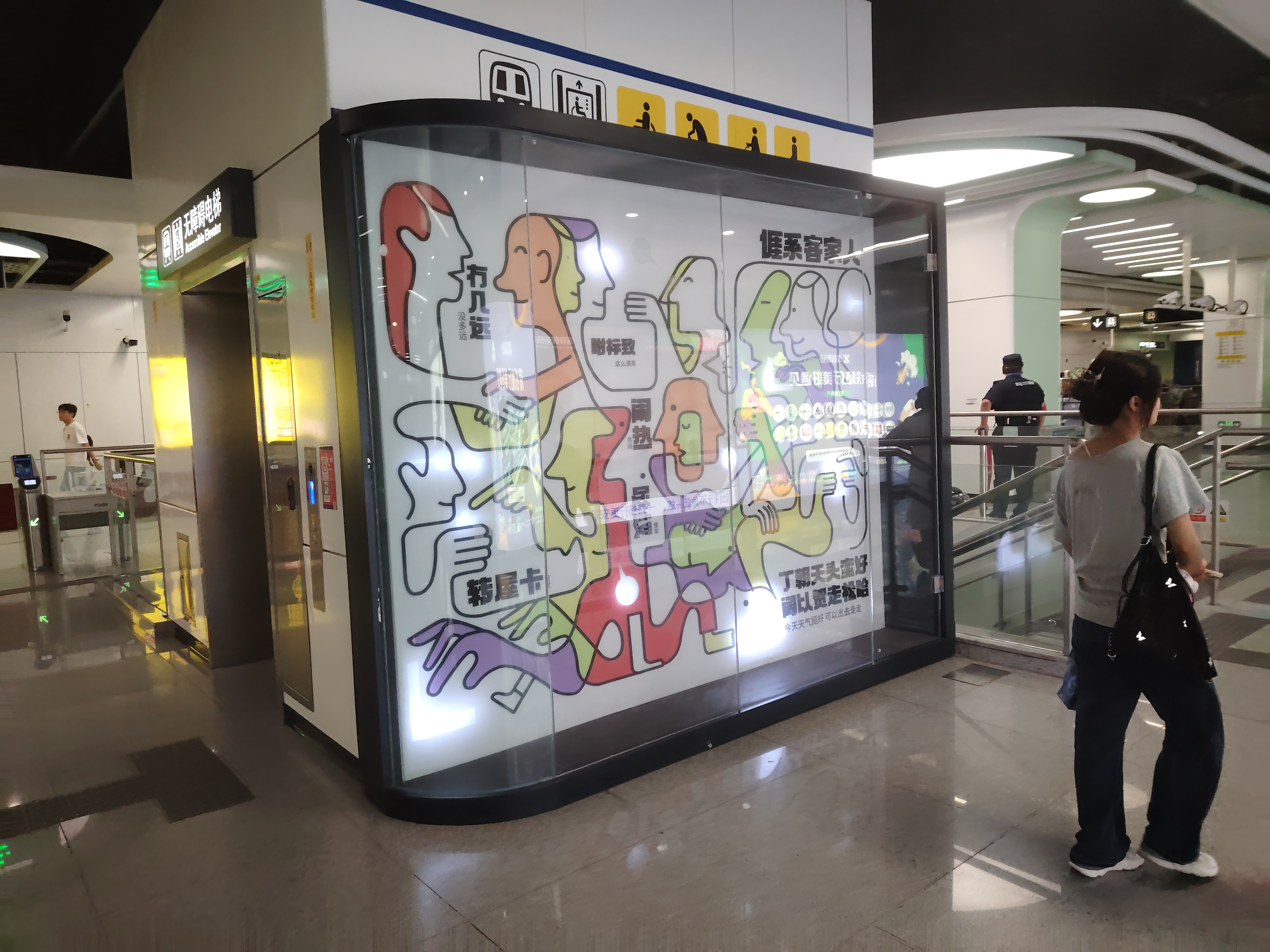
Art wall

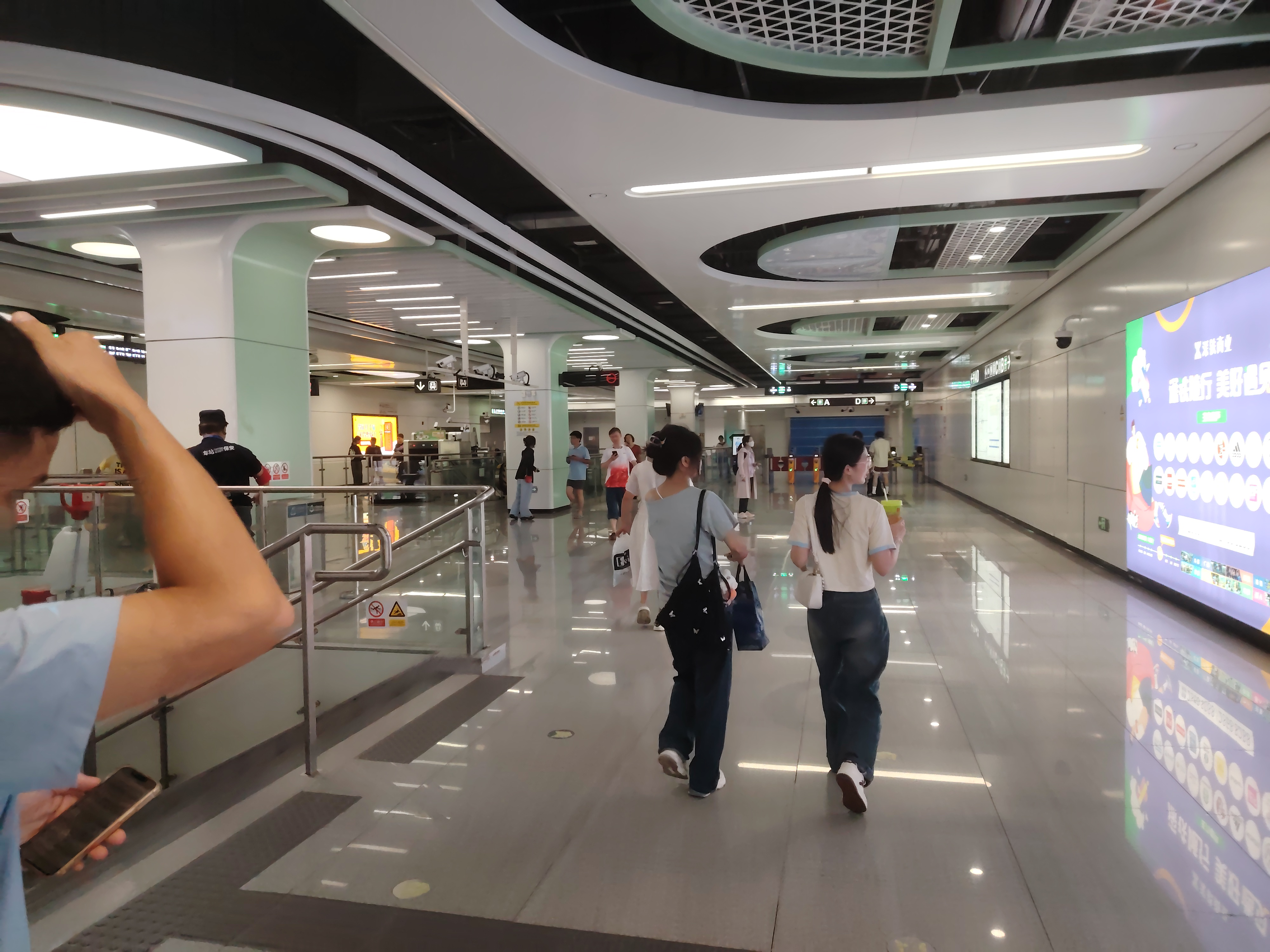
Concourse
