= Longcheng Park station =

Shenzhen Metro Line 16 station

Longcheng Park 龙城公园
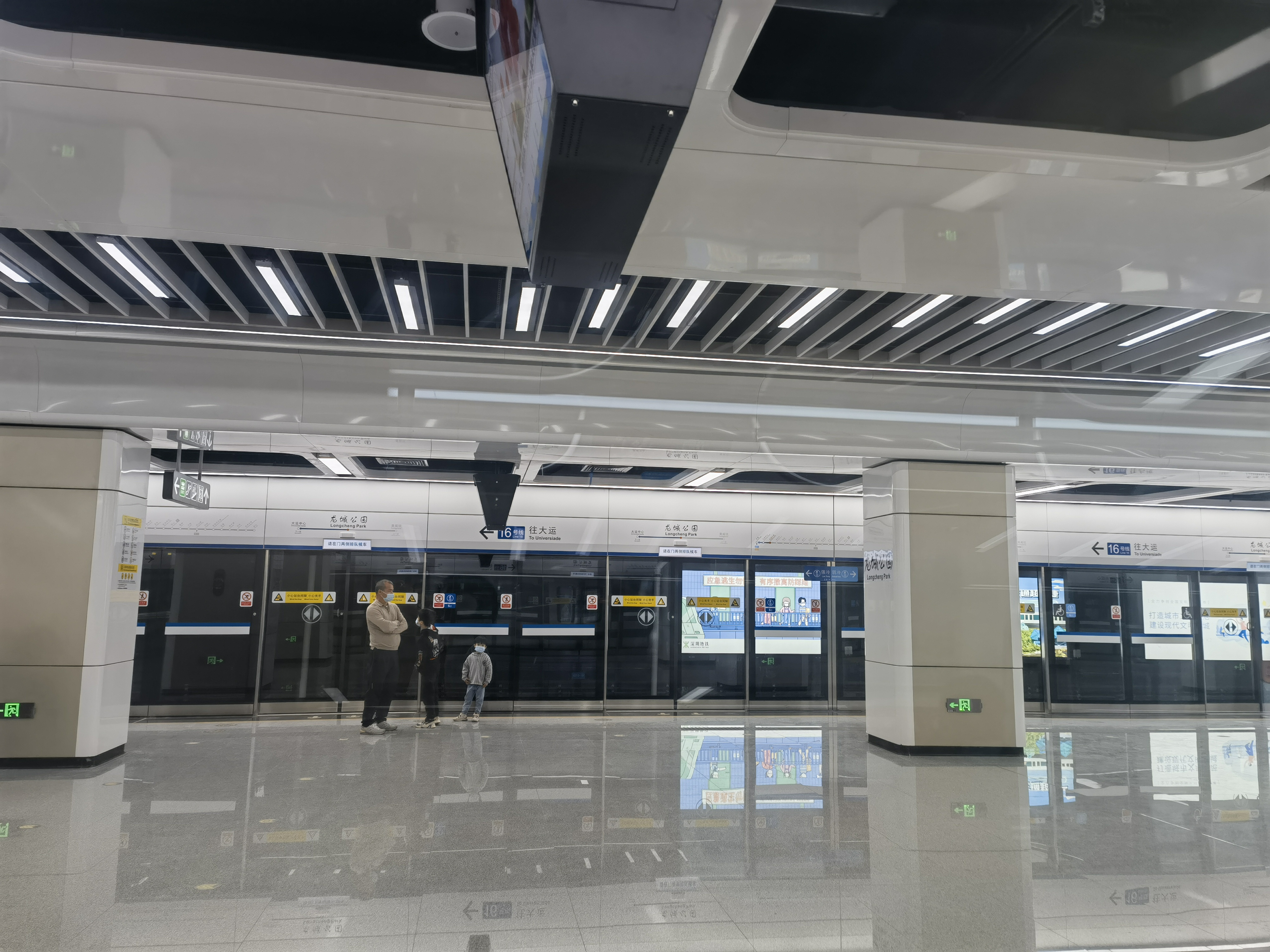
- Platform

Chinese name
- Traditional Chinese: 龍城公園
- Simplified Chinese: 龙城公园
Transcriptions
Standard Mandarin
- Hanyu Pinyin: Lóngchéng Gōngyuán
Yue: Cantonese
- Yale Romanization: Lùhngsìhng Gūng'yún
- Jyutping: Lung4 Sing4 Gung1 Jyun4

General information
- Location: Intersection of Huangge Road and Ruyi Road; Longcheng Subdistrict, Longgang District, Shenzhen, Guangdong; China
- Coordinates: 22°42′20.63″N 114°12′49″E
- Operated by: SZMC (Shenzhen Metro Group)
- Line: Line 16
- Platforms: 2 (1 island platform)
- Tracks: 2

Construction
- Structure type: Underground
- Accessible: Yes

History
- Opened: 28 December 2022; 3 years ago

Services
| Preceding station | Shenzhen Metro | Following station |
|---|---|---|
| Universiade Center towards Yuanshan Xikeng | Line 16 | Huanggekeng towards Tianxin |
Location

Longcheng Park station (simplified Chinese: 龙城公园; traditional Chinese: 龍城公園; pinyin: Lóngchéng Gōngyuán; Cantonese Yale: Lùhngsìhng Gūng'yún) is a station on Line 16 of Shenzhen Metro. It opened on 28 December 2022.

== Station layout ==
The station has an island platform under Huangge Road.

| G | - | Exits A-D |
| B1F; Concourse | Lobby | Ticket Machines, Customer Service, Automatic Vending Machines |
| B2F; Platforms | Platform | 16 towards Yuanshan Xikeng (Universiade Center) |
| B2F; Platforms | Island platform, doors will open on the left |
| B2F; Platforms | Platform | 16 towards Tianxin (Huanggekeng) |

== Exits ==
| Exit | Destination |
|---|---|
| Exit A | Olin Huafu, Sunshine Tianjian City, ECCOM Commercial Building, Longcheng Subdistrict Office |
| Exit B | Ruyi Road (N), Shenzhen No. 3 Senior High School, Longcheng Park (South Gate) |
| Exit C | Huangge Road (W), Yi'an Zhifu Building, Jingji Yujing Times Building, Kaisa Times Building, Beijing University of Chinese Medicine Shenzhen Hospital, Jiaxin Garden, Huangge Cuiyuan |
| Exit D | Huangge Road (W), Zhonghai Kaili Hotel, Shenzhen-Hong Kong International Center |
