= Longyuan station =

Shenzhen Metro Line 16 station

Longyuan 龙园
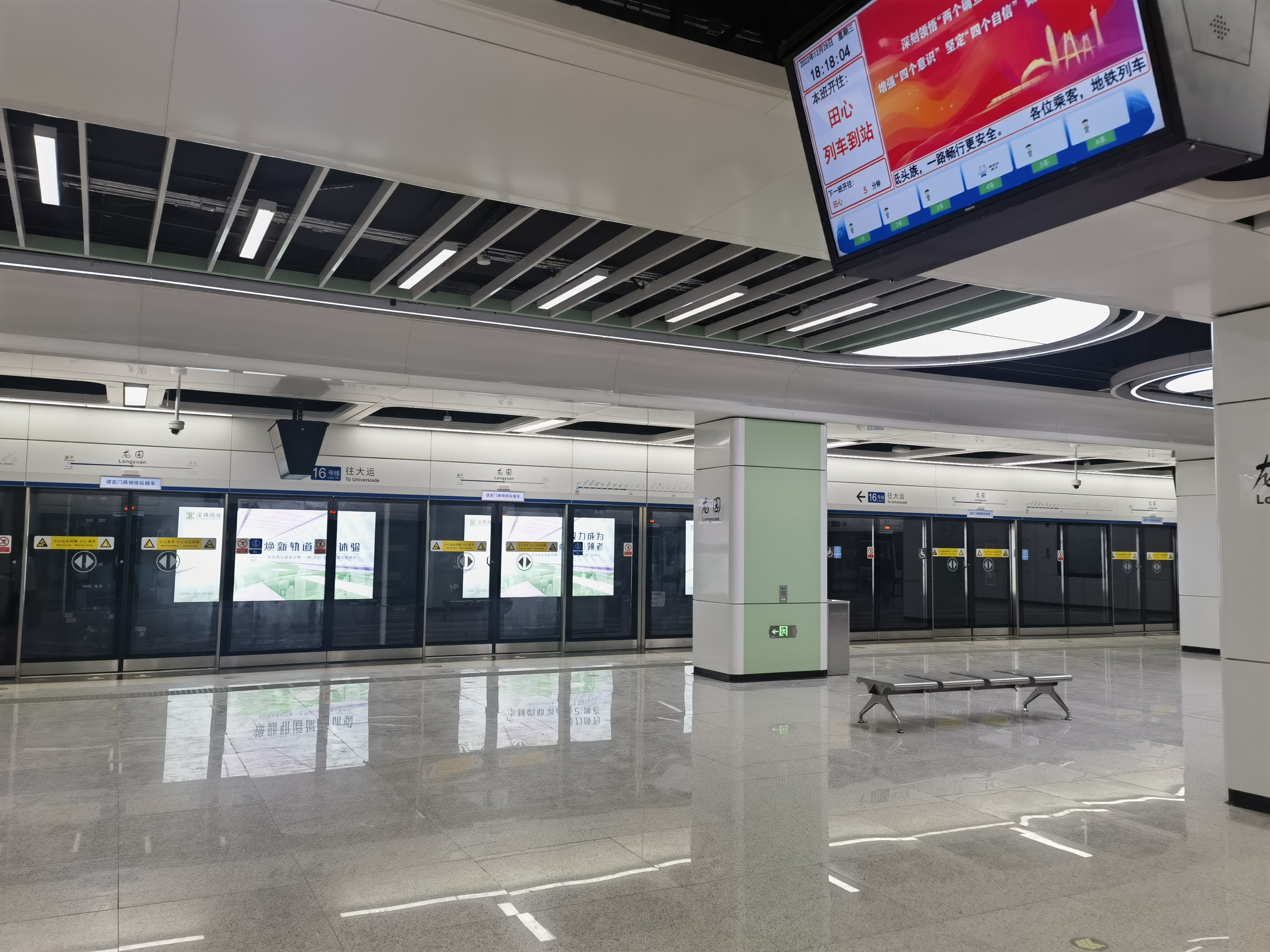
- Platform

Chinese name
- Traditional Chinese: 龍園
- Simplified Chinese: 龙园
Transcriptions
Standard Mandarin
- Hanyu Pinyin: Lóngyuán
Yue: Cantonese
- Yale Romanization: Lùhngyùhn
- Jyutping: Lung4 Jyun4

General information
- Location: Intersection of Longyuan Road and Longping East Road; Longcheng Subdistrict, Longgang District, Shenzhen, Guangdong; China
- Coordinates: 22°44′1.72″N 114°15′41″E
- Operated by: SZMC (Shenzhen Metro Group)
- Line: Line 16
- Platforms: 2 (1 island platform)
- Tracks: 2

Construction
- Structure type: Underground
- Accessible: Yes

History
- Opened: 28 December 2022; 3 years ago

Services
Preceding station	Shenzhen Metro	Following station
Shengping towards Yuanshan Xikeng	Line 16	Shuanglong towards Tianxin
Location

Longyuan station (simplified Chinese: 龙园; traditional Chinese: 龍園; pinyin: Lóngyuán; Cantonese Yale: Lùhngyùhn) is a station on Line 16 of Shenzhen Metro. It opened on 28 December 2022. It is located in Longgang District at the junction of Longyuan Road and Longping East Road.

== Station layout ==
The station has an island platform under Longping East Road.

G	-	Exits B-D
B1F; Concourse	Lobby	Ticket Machines, Customer Service, Automatic Vending Machines
B2F; Platforms	Platform	16 towards Yuanshan Xikeng (Shengping)
B2F; Platforms	Island platform, doors will open on the left
B2F; Platforms	Platform	16 towards Tianxin (Shuanglong)

== Exits ==
Exit	Destination
Exit A	Reserved
Exit B	Longping East Road (S), Jingfeng Building, Jinsheng Orchard
Exit C	Longping East Road (N), Funing Community, Shangwei Community, Pingmen Junior High School
Exit D	Longping East Road (N), Longyuan Park

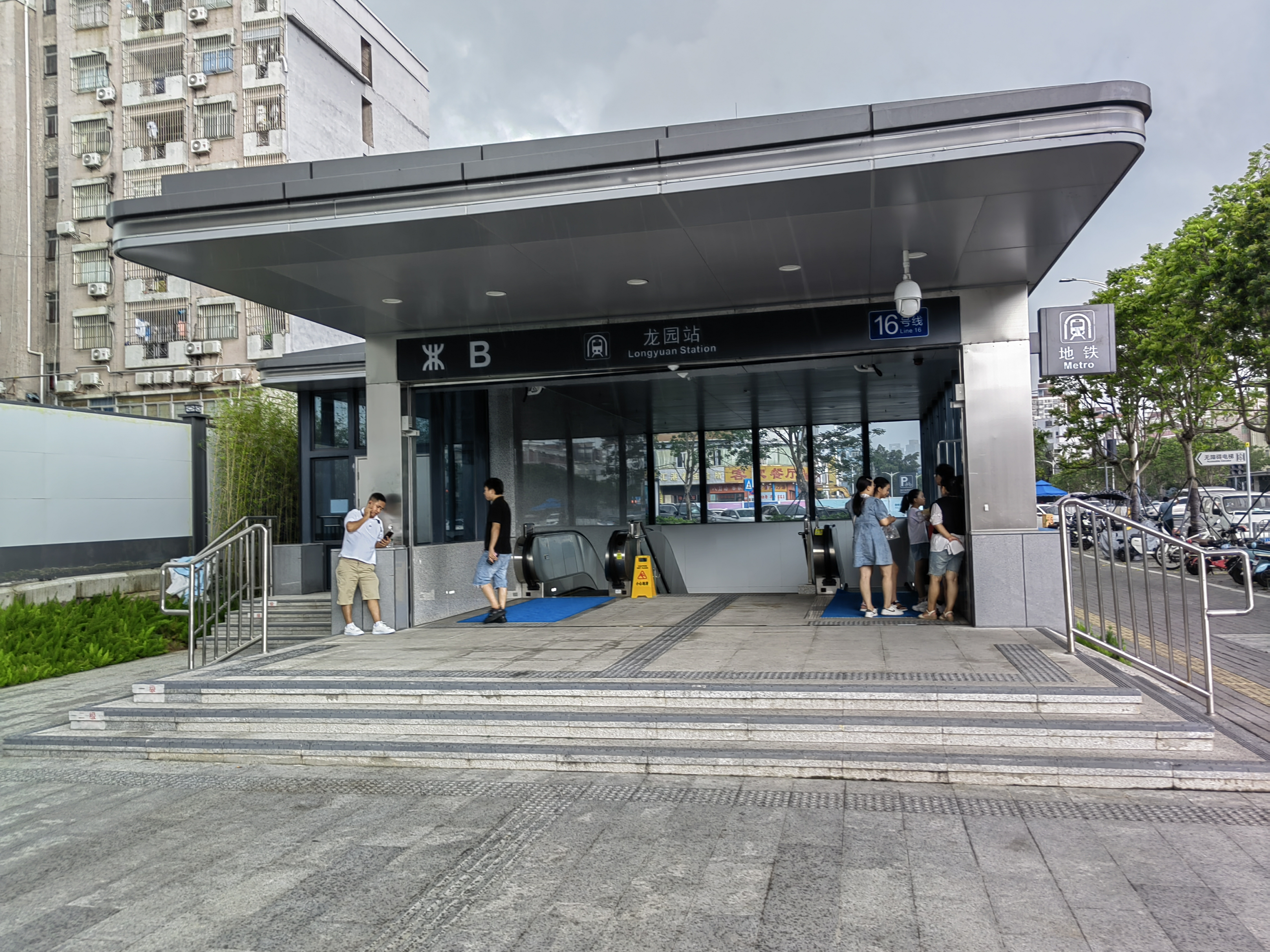
Entrance B

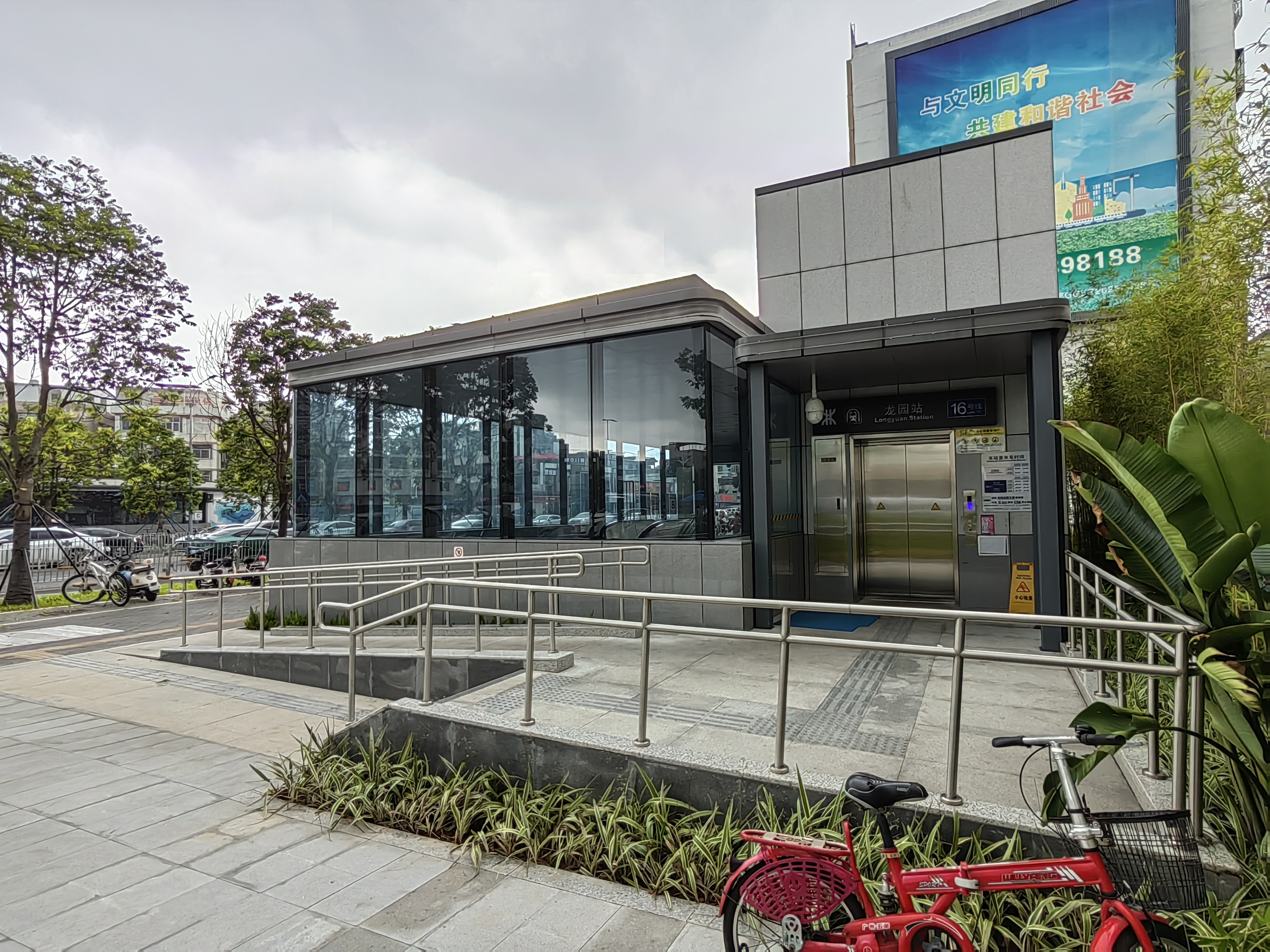
Entrance B (elevator entrance)

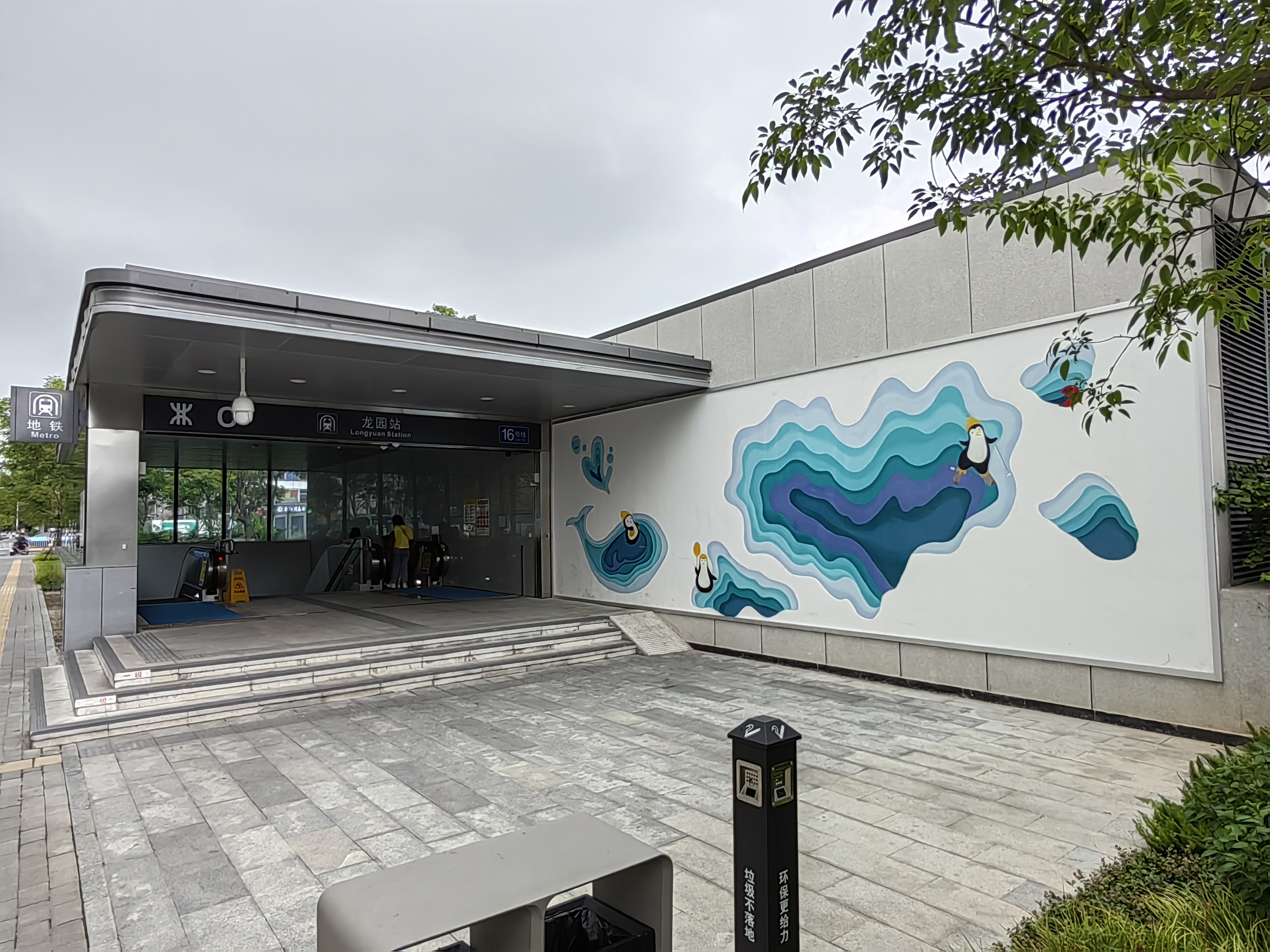
Entrance C
