= Yuyuan station (Shenzhen Metro) =

Shenzhen Metro Line 16 station

Yuyuan 愉园
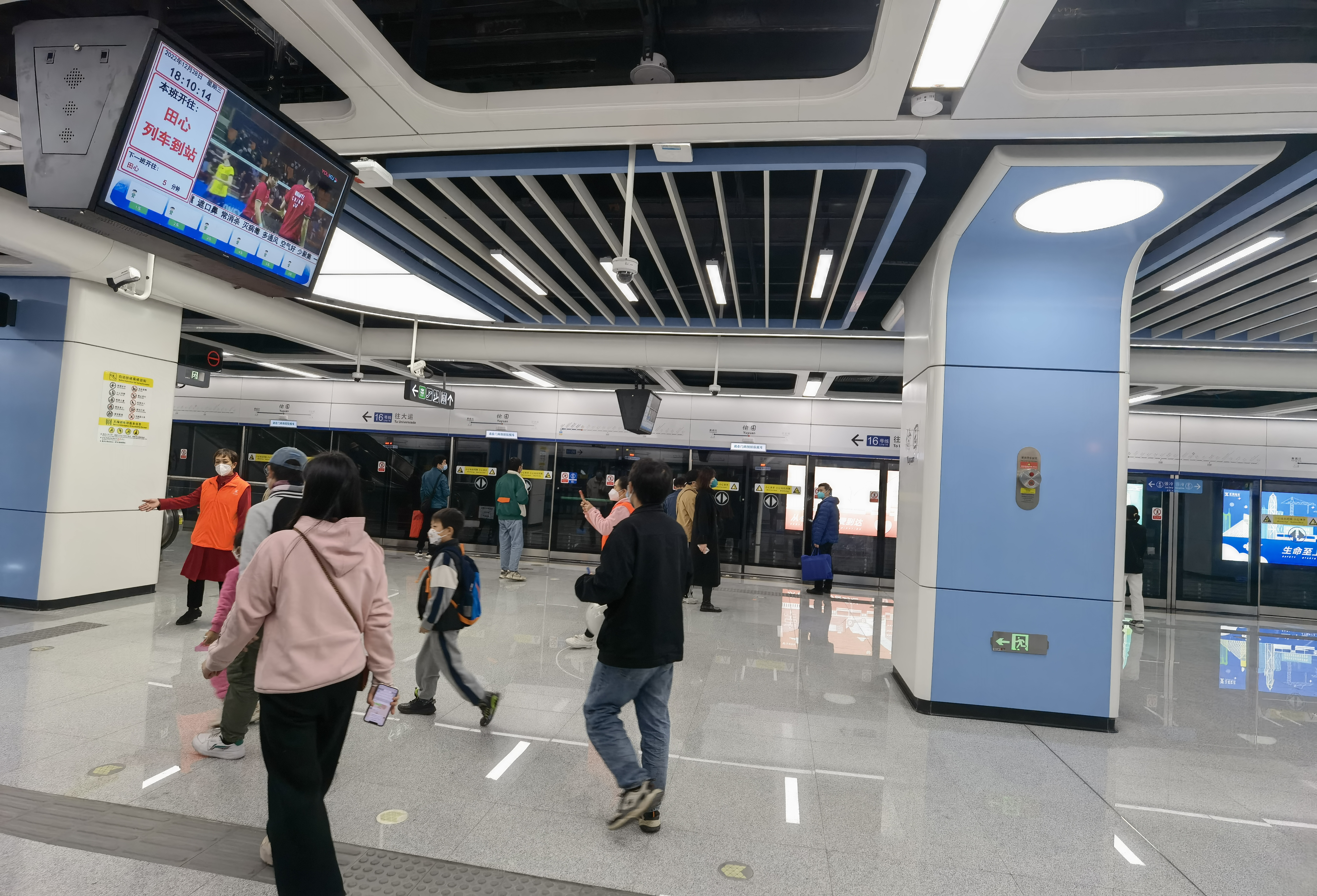
- Platform

Chinese name
- Traditional Chinese: 愉園
- Simplified Chinese: 愉园
Transcriptions
Standard Mandarin
- Hanyu Pinyin: Yúyuán
Yue: Cantonese
- Yale Romanization: Yùhyún
- Jyutping: Jyu4 Jyun4

General information
- Location: Intersection of Longping West Road and Yulong Road; Longcheng Subdistrict, Longgang District, Shenzhen, Guangdong; China
- Coordinates: 22°43′51.56″N 114°13′6.89″E
- Operated by: SZMC (Shenzhen Metro Group)
- Line: Line 16
- Platforms: 2 (1 island platform)

Construction
- Structure type: Underground
- Accessible: Yes

History
- Opened: 28 December 2022; 3 years ago

Services
Preceding station	Shenzhen Metro	Following station
Huanggekeng towards Yuanshan Xikeng	Line 16	Huilongpu towards Tianxin
Location

Yuyuan station (simplified Chinese: 愉园; traditional Chinese: 愉園; pinyin: Yúyuán; Cantonese Yale: Yùhyún) is a station on Line 16 of Shenzhen Metro in Shenzhen, Guangdong, China, which was opened on 28 December 2022. It is located in Longgang District at the junction of Longping Road West and Yulong Road.

== Station layout ==
G	-	Exit
B1F; Concourse	Lobby	Ticket Machines, Customer Service, Automatic Vending Machines
B2F; Platforms	Platform	16 towards Yuanshan Xikeng (Huanggekeng)
B2F; Platforms	Island platform, doors will open on the left
B2F; Platforms	Platform	16 towards Tianxin (Huilongpu)

== Exits ==
Exit	Destination
Exit A	Longping West Road (S), Longguang-Junyue Dragon Palace, Blue Water Bay
Exit B	Longping West Road (S), Aidi Gardens Phase 1, Eastern Qinyuan North
Exit C	Longping West Road (N), Renhen Dream Park
Exit D	Longping West Road (N), Yijing Garden, China Merchants Yishan County
