= Line 16 (Shenzhen Metro) =

Metro line in Shenzhen

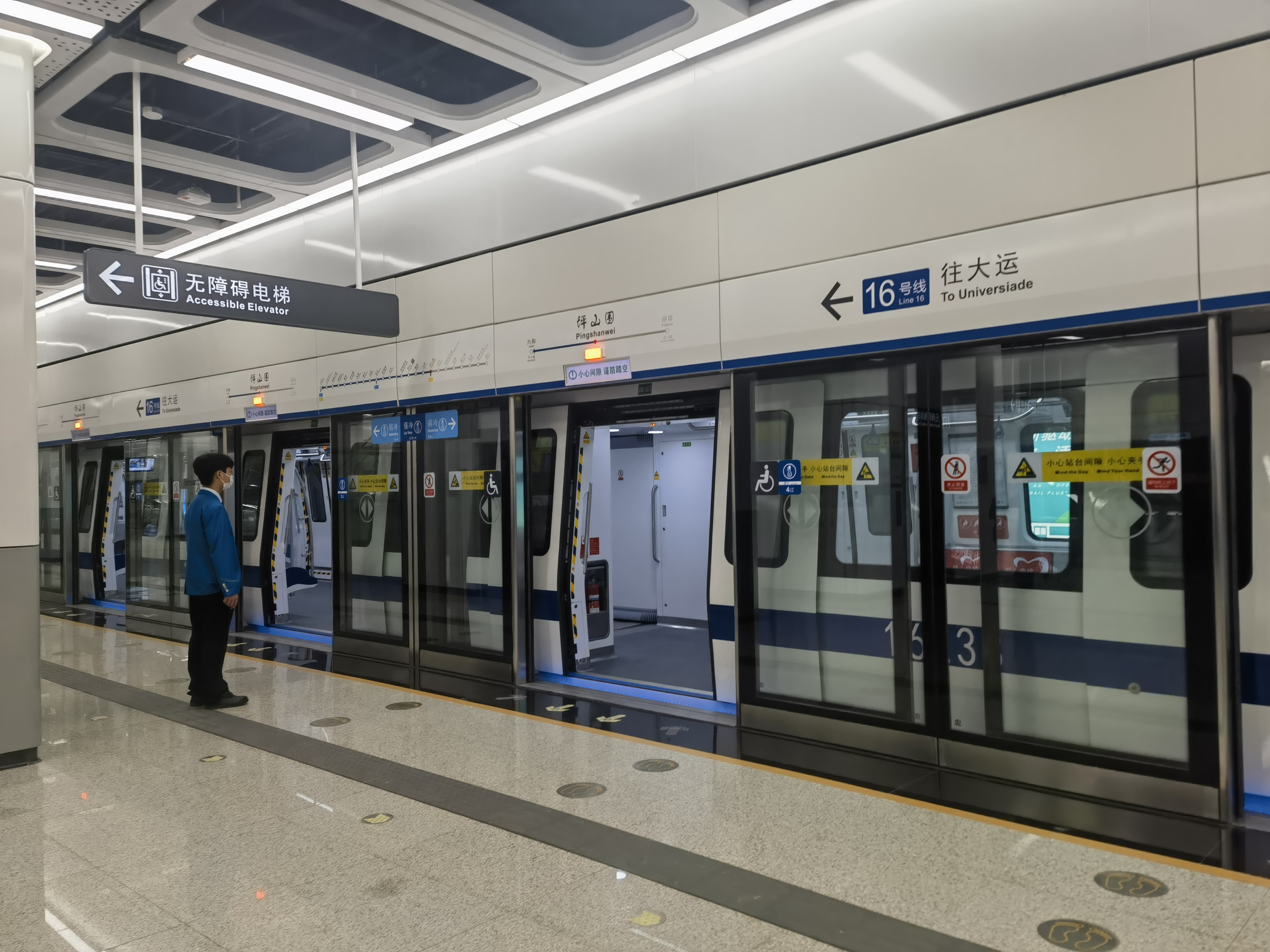
- Pingshanwei station

Overview
- Other name: Longping Line (龙坪线)
- Status: In operation
- Locale: Shenzhen, China
- Termini: Yuanshan Xikeng; Tianxin
- Stations: 32
- Color on map: Ultramarine Violet (#1e22aa)

Service
- Type: Rapid transit
- System: Shenzhen Metro
- Services: 1
- Operator: SZMC (Shenzhen Metro Group)

History
- Opened: 28 December 2022; 3 years ago

Technical
- Line length: 38.66 km (24.02 mi)
- Character: Underground
- Track gauge: 1,435 mm (4 ft 8 1/2 in) standard gauge
- Electrification: 1,500 V DC (overhead lines)
- Operating speed: 80 km/h (50 mph)
- Signalling: Urbalis 888 CBTC Moving block

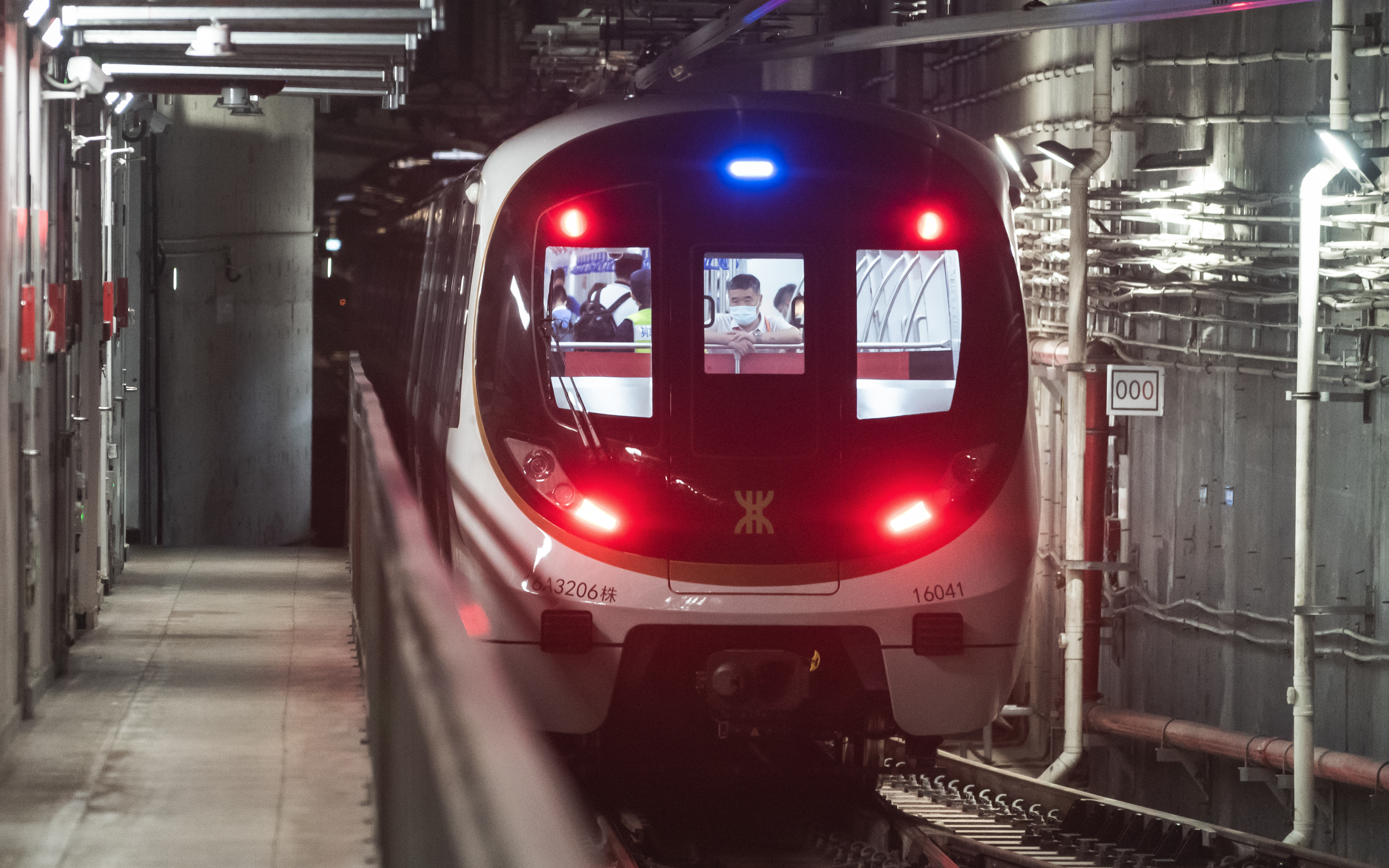
Line 16 train

Line 16 of the Shenzhen Metro is a metro line in north-eastern Shenzhen. It was opened on 28 December 2022. The initial section runs from Universiade in Longgang District to Tianxin in Pingshan District. The initial section has 24 stations and the line is 29.2 kilometers long. Phase 2 opened on 28 September 2025 and extended the line from Universiade to Yuanshan Xikeng, adding 8 stations and extending the line to 38.66 kilometers.

== Stations ==
Station name		Connections	Nearby bus stops	Location
English	Chinese	Connections	Nearby bus stops	Location
Yuanshan Xikeng	园山西坑			Longgang
Anliang	安良			Longgang
Fukeng	福坑			Longgang
Dakang	大康			Longgang
Yuanshan	园山			Longgang
Da'an	大安			Longgang
Jixi	吉溪			Longgang
Jinyuan	金源			Longgang
Universiade	大运	3 14	351 358 833 923 E23 E33 E34 M219 M229 M239 M266 M294 M303 M317 M318 M322 M357 M359 M360 M396 M446 M547 M593 358-express（358快）Peak-time 146（高峰146）Peak-time 957（高峰957）Dongguan 786（莞786）	Longgang
Universiade Center	大运中心		802 923 E5 E6 E27 M139 M229 M315 M317 M318 M360 M386 M446 M447 Peak-express 81（高快81）Dongguan 782（莞782）	Longgang
Longcheng Park	龙城公园		E25 E27 M139 M229 M230 M318 M320 M360 M386 M446 M447 Peak-express 81（高快81）	Longgang
Huanggekeng	黄阁坑		810 818 833 862 E5 E25 E27 M139 M220 M229 M230 M276 M280 M317 M360 M386 M446 M447 M589 M593 Peak-express 81（高快81）Peak-time 185（高峰185）	Longgang
Yuyuan	愉园		M230 M276 M317 M361 M446 M458 Peak-time 185（高峰185）	Longgang
Huilongpu	回龙埔		818 923 B872 E5 M229 M275 M276 M303 M306 M317 M361 M446 M304-clockwise（304顺时针）Peak-express 56（高快56）Peak-time 123（高峰123）Huizhou 208（惠州208）	Longgang
Shangjing	尚景		M303 M306 M317 M319 M501A M501B Peak-time 185（高峰185）	Longgang
Shengping	盛平		802 B629 M276 M303 M317 M386 M556 M304-clockwise（304顺时针）	Longgang
Longyuan	龙园		358 810 M276 M277 M308 M386 M556 358-Express（358快）M304-clockwise（304顺时针）M304-anticlockwise（304逆时针）	Longgang
Shuanglong	双龙	3	351 810 811 818 862 E6 E7 E23 E25 E33 E34 M136 M139 M219 M230 M239 M266 M275 M276 M277 M280 M307 M308 M359 M361 M386 M396 M304-clockwise（304顺时针）M305-clockwise（305顺时针）Peak-time 17（高峰17）	Longgang
Xintangwei	新塘围		802 818 E6 E33 E34 M136 M230 M266 M277 M279 M296 M359 M361 M304-clockwise（304顺时针）M305-clockwise（305顺时针）	Longgang
Longdong	龙东		802 818 E34 M136 M230 M266 M277 M279 M296 M320 M359 M361 M304-clockwise（304顺时针）	Longgang
Baolong Tongle	宝龙同乐		802 818 E34 M136 M266 M277 M279 M288 M296 M359 M361 M395	Longgang
Pingshan	坪山	IFQ; Pingshan SkyShuttle Line 1	802 915 939A 939B 963 978 B760 B923 M288 M293 M308 M317 M325 M359 M426 M427 M440 M443 M478 M479 M480 M497 M546-clockwise（546顺时针）M546-anticlockwise（546逆时针）Pingmei-holiday-express（坪梅假日快线）	Pingshan
Xinhe	新和	19	B923	Pingshan
Liuhe	六和		818 939A 939B 941 963 964 978 B811 E34 M136 M277 M279 M296 M325 M357 M361 M368 M434 M443 M447 M480 M564	Pingshan
Pingshanwei	坪山围	14	366 833 915 941 963 964 978 B760 E22 M136 M277 M288 M295 M296 M325 M326 M361 M434 M439 M443 M479 M564 M575 M546-clockwise（546顺时针）M546-anticlockwise（546逆时针）	Pingshan
Pinghuan	坪环		818 915 939A 939B 964 B760 M143 M279 M357 M479 M480 M564 M575 M546-clockwise（546顺时针）M546-anticlockwise（546逆时针）	Pingshan
Dongjiang Column Memorial Hall	东纵纪念馆	Pingshan SkyShuttle Line 1	818 939A 939B 964 M143 M279 M357 M479 M564 M571 M575 M546-clockwise（546顺时针）M546-anticlockwise（546逆时针）	Pingshan
Shabo	沙壆		818 939A 939B E17 M151 M279 M357 M426 M564 M546-clockwise（546顺时针）M546-anticlockwise（546逆时针）Peak-time 175（高峰175）	Pingshan
Yanzihu	燕子湖		818 939A 939B M151 M279 M294 M357 M426 M564 M576	Pingshan
Shijing	石井		939A 939B E17 M151 M294 M440 M576	Pingshan
Technology University	技术大学		939A 939B E17 M151 M189 M296	Pingshan
Tianxin	田心		939A 939B M189 M296 M440 Dayawan 138B（大亚湾138B）	Pingshan
