= Tianxin station =

Shenzhen Metro station

Tianxin 田心
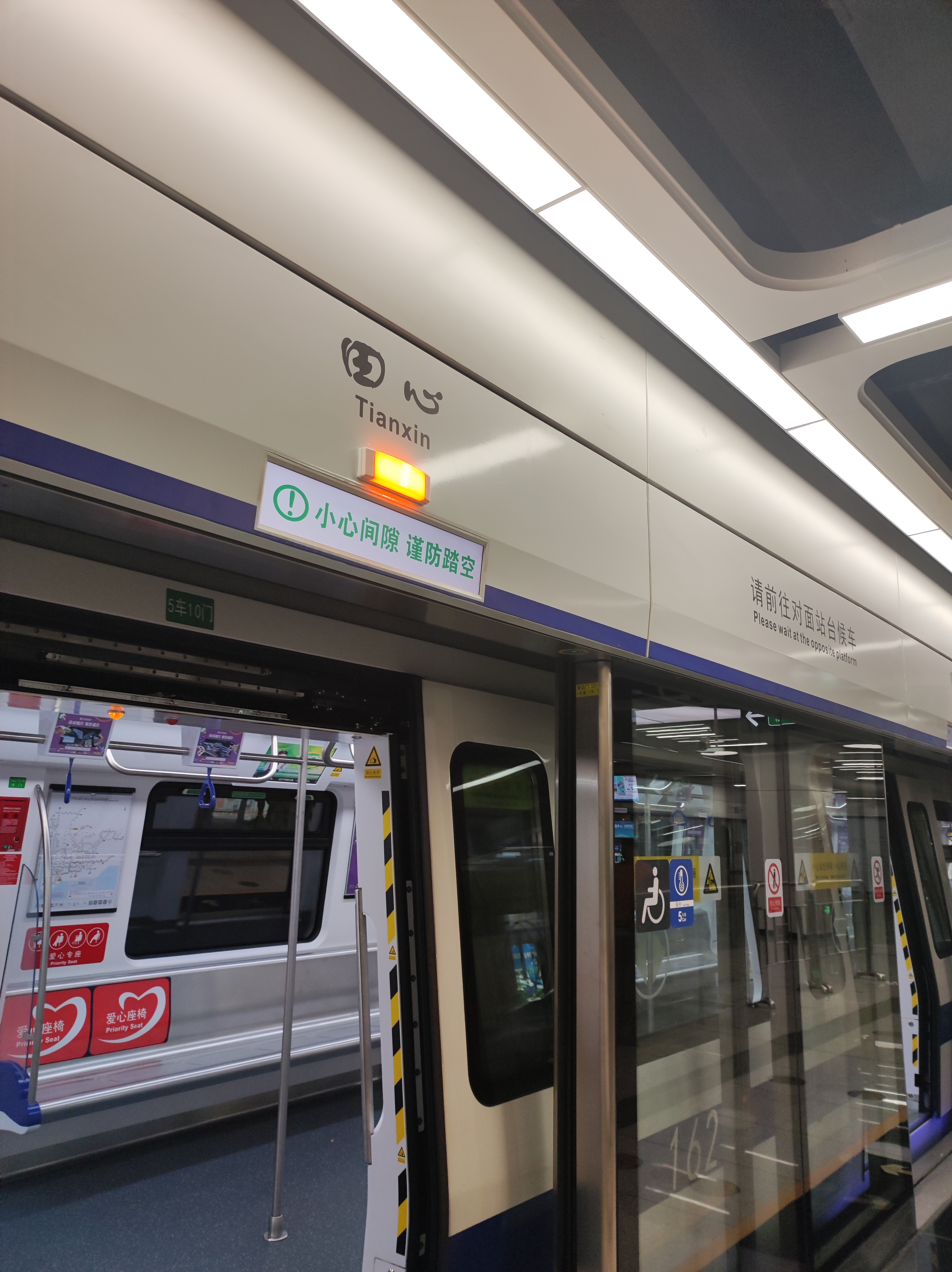
- Terminating platform

Chinese name
- Chinese: 田心
Transcriptions
Standard Mandarin
- Hanyu Pinyin: Tiánxīn
Yue: Cantonese
- Yale Romanization: Tìnsām
- Jyutping: Tin4 Sam1

General information
- Location: West of the intersection of Pingshan Jintian Road and Xintian Road; Pingshan District, Shenzhen, Guangdong; China
- Coordinates: 22°41′46″N 114°24′34″E
- Operated by: SZMC (Shenzhen Metro Group)
- Line: Line 16
- Platforms: 2 (1 island platform)
- Tracks: 2

Construction
- Structure type: Underground
- Accessible: Yes

History
- Opened: 28 December 2022; 3 years ago

Services
Preceding station	Shenzhen Metro	Following station
Technology University towards Yuanshan Xikeng	Line 16	Terminus
Location

Tianxin station (Chinese: 田心; pinyin: Tiánxīn; Cantonese Yale: Tìnsām) is a station on Line 16 of Shenzhen Metro in China. It opened on 28 December 2022, and is the eastern terminus of the line.

== Station layout ==
The station has an island platform under Pingshan Jintian Road.

G	-	Exits A-C
B1F; Concourse	Lobby	Ticket Machines, Customer Service, Automatic Vending Machines
B2F; Platforms	Platform	16 towards Yuanshan Xikeng (Technology University)
B2F; Platforms	Island platform, doors will open on the left
B2F; Platforms	Platform	16 termination platform

== Exits ==
Exit	Destination
Exit A	Pingshan Jintian Road (S), Red Army Yard
Exit B	Pingshan Jintian Road (N), Tianxin Depot
Exit C	Pingshan Jintian Road (N), Tianxin Depot

== Gallery ==
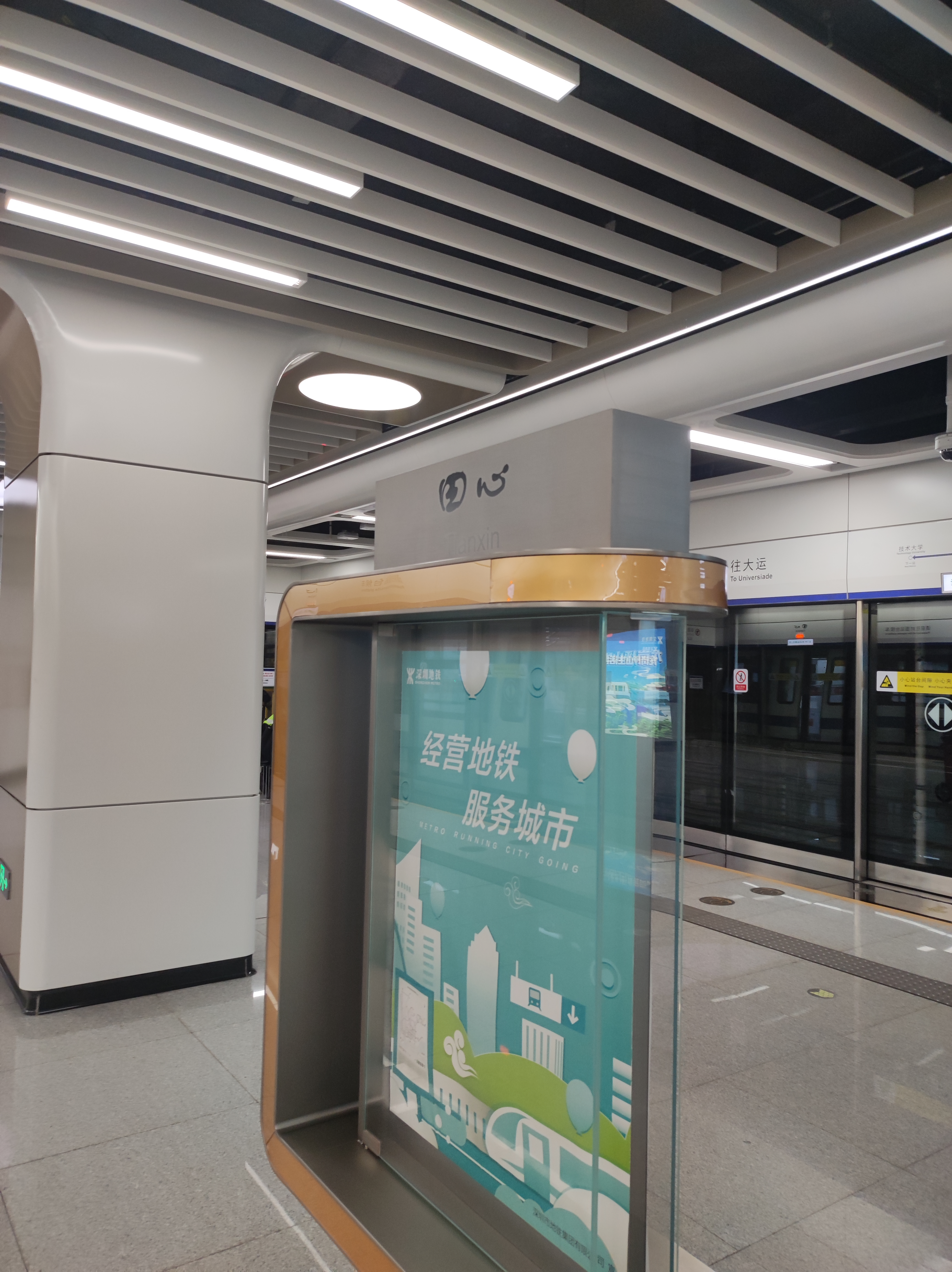
Platform plaque

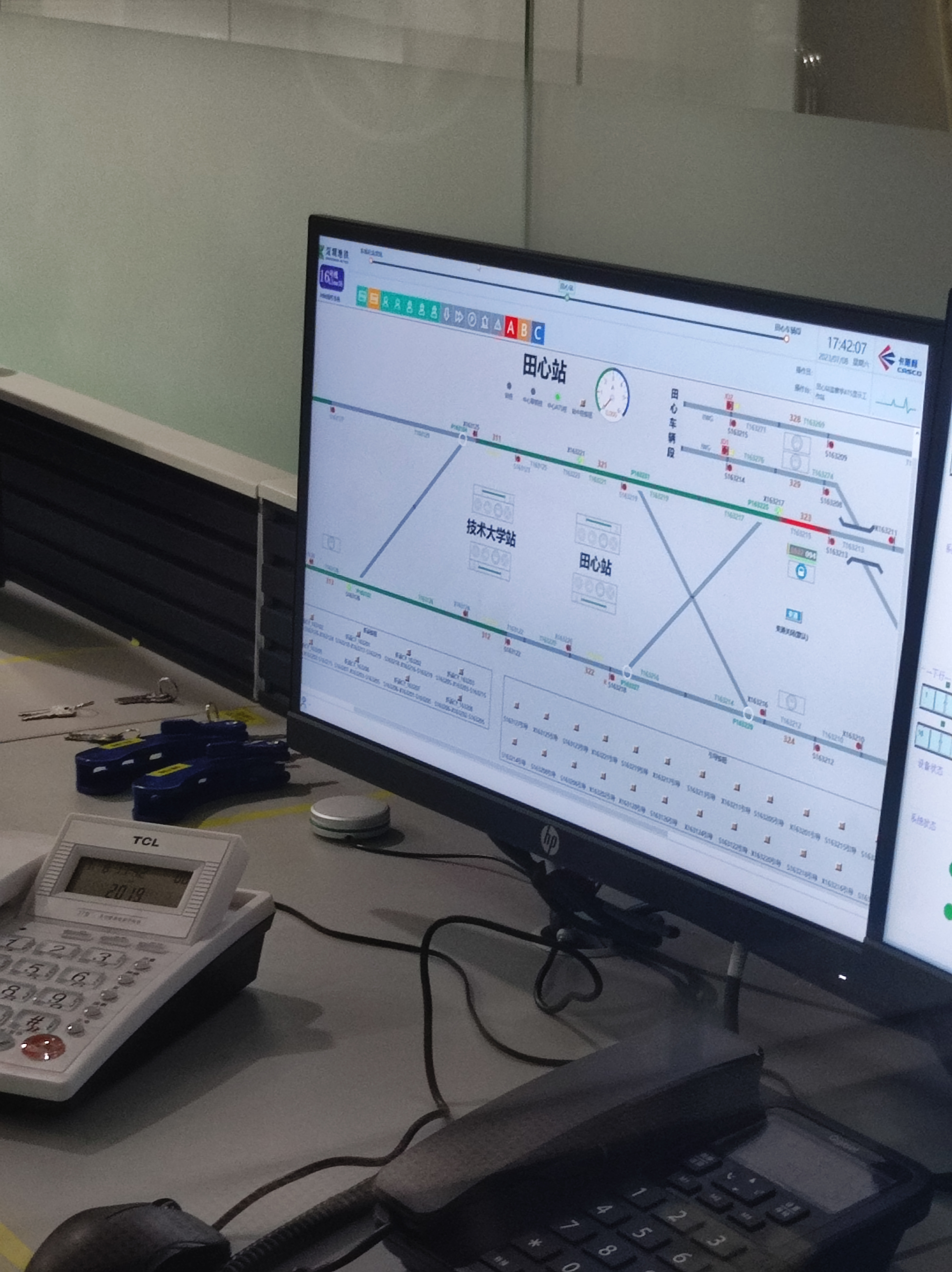
Station line map from control center
