= List of university stations =

This is a general list of public transport stations serving at least one university, with any variation of the word university in its name.

== Africa ==
=== Egypt ===
- Helwan University station, a metro station serving line 1 in Cairo
- Cairo University station, a metro station serving line 2 in Cairo
- Kolleyyet El-Zeraa, a metro station serving line 2 in Cairo
- Kolleyet El-Banat, a metro station serving line 3 in Cairo
- Gamat El-Dowal, a metro station serving line 3 in Giza

== Asia ==
=== Bangladesh ===
- Dhaka University metro station, a metro station serving Dhaka University

=== China ===
==== Beijing ====
- Beijing Univ. of Tech West Gate station, a subway station serving Beijing University of Technology
- Capital Univ. of Economics & Business station, a subway station
- Communication Univ of China station, a subway station
- Liangxiang Univ. Town station, a subway station serving universities in the Liangxiang University Town
- Liangxiang Univ. Town North station, a subway station serving universities in the Liangxiang University Town
- Liangxiang Univ. Town West station, a subway station serving universities in the Liangxiang University Town
- Peking Univ East Gate station, a subway station serving Peking University
- Renmin Univ. station, a subway station
- Shahe Univ. Park station, a subway station serving universities campuses in the Shahe University Park

==== Chongqing ====
- Chongqing Jiaotong University station, a monorail station
- Chongqing Technology and Business University station, a monorail station
- Chongqing University station, a metro station
- Daxuecheng station (Chongqing Rail Transit), a metro station serving universities in Chongqing University Town
- Southwest University station, a metro station

==== Guangdong ====
===== Guangzhou =====
- Guangzhou University of Chinese Medicine station, a metro station in Guangzhou
- Higher Education Mega Center North station, a metro station in Guangzhou serving the Guangzhou Higher Education Mega Center
- Higher Education Mega Center South station, a metro station in Guangzhou serving the Guangzhou Higher Education Mega Center
- South China Normal University station, a metro station in Guangzhou
- Sun Yat-sen University South Gate station, a metro station in Guangzhou
- Sun Yat-sen University station (Guangzhou Metro), a metro station in Guangzhou

===== Shenzhen =====
- Peking University station, a metro station in Shenzhen serving the Peking University Shenzhen Graduate School
- Shenzhen University station, a metro station in Shenzhen
- Shenzhen University South station, a metro station in Shenzhen
- Sun Yat-sen University station (Shenzhen Metro), a metro station in Shenzhen
- SZU Lihu Campus station, a metro station in Shenzhen
- Technology University station, a metro station in Shenzhen serving Shenzhen Technology University
- University Town station (Shenzhen Metro), a metro station in Shenzhen serving universities in the University Town of Shenzhen

==== Hebei ====
- Universities station, a rail rapid transit station in Baoding
- Zhuangke Tiedaodaxue station, a metro station in Shijiazhuang

==== Hubei ====
- Huazhong University of Science and Technology station, a metro station in Wuhan
- Hubei University station, a metro station in Wuhan
- Hubei University of Technology station, a metro station in Wuhan
- Polytechnic University station, a metro station in Wuhan

==== Hunan ====
- Acad. of Agri-Sciences & Agri-University, a metro station in Changsha
- Central South University station, a metro station in Changsha
- Changsha University station, a metro station in Changsha
- Hunan First Normal University (West Campus) station, a metro station in Changsha
- Hunan Normal University station, a metro station in Changsha
- Hunan University of Technology and Business station a metro station in Changsha
- Hunan University station, a metro station in Changsha

==== Shaanxi ====
- Jianzhukejidaxue · Lijiacun station, a metro station in Xi'an serving Xi'an University of Architecture and Technology ('Jianzhukejidaxue').
- Jiaotongdaxue · Xingqinggong station, a metro station in Xi'an serving Xi'an Jiaotong University ('Jiaotongdaxue').
- Ligongdaqujiangxiaoqu station, a metro station in Xi'an serving the Qujiang campus ('Qujiangxiaoqu') of Xi'an University of Technology ('Ligongda').
- Shaanxi Zhongyiyao Daxue station, a metro station in Xi'an serving Shaanxi University of Chinese Medicine.
- Xi'angongda · Wudelu station, a metro station in Xi'an serving Xi'an Technological University ('Xi'angongda').
- Xibeigongyedaxue station, a metro station in Xi'an serving Northwestern Polytechnical University.
- Xidiankedananxiaoqu · Weilaizhitong station, a metro station in Xi'an serving the southern campus ('Nanxiaoqu') of Xidian University ('Xidiankeda').
- Xigongchengda · Xikeda (Lintongxiaoqu) station, a metro station in Xi'an serving the Lintong campuses ('Lintongxiaoqu') of Xi'an Polytechnic University ('Xigongchengda') and Xi'an University of Science and Technology ('Xikeda').

==== Shanghai ====
- East China University of Science and Technology station, a metro station
- Fudan University station, a metro station
- Jiao Tong University station, a metro station serving Shanghai Jiao Tong University
- Shanghai University of Finance and Economics station, a metro station
- Shanghai University station, a metro station
- Songjiang University Town station, a metro station serving universities in the Songjiang University Town
- Tongji University station, a metro station

==== Sichuan ====
- Chengdu University station, a metro station in Chengdu
- Chengdu University of TCM & Sichuan Provincial People's Hospital station, a metro station in Chengdu
- Chengdu University of Technology station, a metro station in Chengdu
- Sichuan Normal University station, a metro station in Chengdu
- Sichuan University Jiang'an Campus station, a metro station in Chengdu
- Sichuan University Wangjiang Campus station, a metro station in Chengdu
- Southwest Jiaotong University station, a metro station in Chengdu
- Southwest Jiaotong University & Xingye North Street station, a metro station in Chengdu
- Southwest Petroleum University station, a metro station in Chengdu
- Southwestern University of Finance and Economics station, a metro station in Chengdu
- University of Electronic Science and Technology of China & Jianshe North Road station, a metro station in Chengdu

==== Tianjin ====
- Caijingdaxue station, a metro station serving the Tianjin University of Finance and Economics
- Daxuecheng station (Tianjin Metro), a metro station serving Tiangong University
- Minhangdaxue station, a metro station serving Civil Aviation University of China
- Nankaidaxuebalitai station, a metro station serving Nankai University
- Nankaidaxuejinnanxiaoqu station, a metro station serving Nankai University
- Tianjindaxuebeiyangyuanxiaoqu station, a metro station serving Tianjin University
- Tianjindaxueliulitai station, a metro station serving Tianjin University

==== Zhejiang ====
- Cangqian Campus, Hangzhou Normal University station, a metro station in Hangzhou
- Gongshang University Yunbin station, a metro station in Hangzhou
- Zhejiang A&F University station, a metro station in Hangzhou
- Zhejiang Chinese Medical University station, a metro station in Hangzhou
- Zijingang Campus, Zhejiang University station, a metro station in Hangzhou

=== Hong Kong ===
- University station (MTR), a railway station serving the Chinese University of Hong Kong, in Sha Tin District, New Territories
- HKU station, a subway station serving the University of Hong Kong, in the Western District

=== India ===
- Vishwavidyalaya, a metro station on the Yellow Line of the Delhi Metro, serving the North Campus of the University of Delhi.
- Vishwavidyalaya, a metro station on the Orange Line of the Kanpur Metro, serving the CSJM University (formerly Kanpur University).
- Vishwavidyalaya, a metro station on the Red Line of the Lucknow Metro, serving the University of Lucknow.
- Cochin University, a metro station on the Kochi Metro, serving Cochin University.

=== Indonesia ===
- Universitas Indonesia railway station, a station serving the University of Indonesia, Greater Jakarta, in Depok, West Java
- Universitas Pancasila railway station, a station serving the Pancasila University, in Jagakarsa, South Jakarta, Jakarta.

=== Israel ===
- Tel Aviv University - Expo a station serving northern Tel Aviv, Tel Aviv University and the Tel Aviv Convention Center.
- Be'er Sheva North/University Railway Station a station serving Northern Be'er Sheva and Ben Gurion University.

=== Japan ===
- Tohoku Fukushi University Station, a railway station in Aoba-ku, Sendai, Miyagi Prefecture
- Wakayama University Station, a railway station in Wakayama, Wakayama Prefecture
- Nagoya University Station, a subway station in Nagoya, Aichi Prefecture

=== Macau ===
- MUST station, a light rapid transit station serving the Macau University of Science and Technology

=== Malaysia ===
==== Kuala Lumpur ====
- Universiti LRT station, a light rail station serving the University of Malaya (Universiti Malaya)

==== Selangor ====
- SunU-Monash BRT station, a bus rapid transit station serving the Monash University Malaysia Campus and Sunway University
- Taman Universiti MRT station, a proposed mass rapid transit station
- UKM Komuter station, a commuter rail station serving the National University of Malaysia (Universiti Kebangsaan Malaysia) in Bangi
- UPM MRT station, a mass rapid transit station serving the University of Putra Malaysia (Universiti Putra Malaysia) in Serdang
- UiTM Shah Alam LRT station, a light rail station serving the MARA Technological University (Universiti Teknologi MARA) in Shah Alam

=== Qatar ===
- Qatar University station, a metro station in Doha

=== South Korea ===
==== Busan ====
- Busan National University of Education station, a metro station
- Dong-eui University station, a metro station
- Inje University station, a metro station
- Kaya University station, a metro station
- Kyungsung University–Pukyong National University station, a metro station
- Presbyterian University station, a metro station
- Pusan National University station, a metro station
- Pusan National University Yangsan Campus station, a metro station
- Youngsan University station, a metro station

==== Seoul ====
- City Hall–Yongin University station, a subway station
- Gachon University station, a subway station (originally named Kyungwon University station)
- Hongik University station, a subway station
- Konkuk University station, a subway station
- Korea University station, a subway station
- Kyungwon University station, a subway station (renamed Gachon University station)
- Seoul National University station, a subway station
- Soonchunhyang University station, a subway station
- Sogang University station, a subway station
- Soongsil University station, a subway station

==== Suwon ====
- Sungkyunkwan University station, a subway station

=== Sri Lanka ===
- Sarasavi Uyana railway station, a railway station (also known as University station) serving the University of Peradeniya

=== Taiwan ===
- Fu Jen University MRT station, a metro station serving the Fu Jen Catholic University, in New Taipei
- Gongguan MRT station, or National Taiwan University station as its secondary name, a metro station in Taipei
- National Taiwan University Hospital MRT station, a metro station serving the National Taiwan University Hospital, in Taipei
- National Taipei University MRT station, a metro station serving the National Taipei University Sanxia Campus, in New Taipei
- Chang Jung Christian University railway station, serving the Chang Jung Christian University, in Tainan

=== Thailand ===
- Bangkok University station, a railway station, scheduled to open in 2028
- Kasetsart University BTS station, a metro station
- Lak Hok (Rangsit University) station, a railway station
- Ramkhamhaeng University MRT station, a metro station, scheduled to open in 2030
- Thammasat University station, a railway station, scheduled to open in 2028

=== Vietnam ===
- National University station (Hanoi), a metro station serving the Vietnam National University, Hanoi
- National University station (Ho Chi Minh City), a metro station serving the Vietnam National University, Ho Chi Minh City

== Europe ==
=== Bulgaria ===
==== Sofia ====
- Medical University Metro Station, serving the Medical University. Part of the Sofia Metro.
- SU St. Kliment Ohridski Metro Station, serving Sofia University. Part of the Sofia Metro.

=== Denmark ===
==== Copenhagen ====
- DR Byen - Universitetet, a Copenhagen Metro stop serving the IT University of Copenhagen and the South campus of the University of Copenhagen.

==== Lyngby (Greater Copenhagen) ====
- Akademivej - DTU, a Greater Copenhagen Light Rail stop serving the Lyngby campus of the Technical University of Denmark (DTU)
- Anker Engelundsvej - DTU, a Greater Copenhagen Light Rail stop serving the Lyngby campus of the Technical University of Denmark (DTU)

==== Odense ====
- SDU - University, a Odense Light Rail stop serving the Odense campus of the University of Southern Denmark (SDU)
- SDU Syd / Hospital Nord, a Odense Light Rail stop serving the Odense campus of the University of Southern Denmark (SDU)

==== Aalborg ====
- Hospitalsbyen - Aalborg Universitetshospital, an Aalborg Plusbus (BRT) stop serving the Hospitalsbyen campus of the Aalborg University Hospital
- Servicehuset - Aalborg Universitetshospital, an Aalborg Plusbus (BRT) stop serving the Hospitalsbyen campus of the Aalborg University Hospital
- AAU Fibigerstræde, an Aalborg Plusbus (BRT) stop serving the Aalborg East campus of the Aalborg University (AAU)
- AAU Fredrik Bajers Vej, an Aalborg Plusbus (BRT) stop serving the Aalborg East campus of the Aalborg University (AAU)

==== Aarhus ====
- Universitetsparken, an Aarhus Light Rail stop serving the Aarhus campus of the Aarhus University (AU)
- Aarhus Universitet - Ringgaden, an Aarhus Light Rail stop serving the Aarhus campus of the Aarhus University (AU)
- Aarhus Universitetshospital, an Aarhus Light Rail stop serving the Skejby campus of the Aarhus University Hospital (AUH)

=== Finland ===
- Aalto University metro station, serving the Otaniemi Campus of the Aalto University in Espoo
- University of Helsinki metro station, serving the City Centre Campus of the University of Helsinki

=== France ===
==== Paris ====
- Créteil–Université station, a station of Line 8 of the Métro serving Paris-East Créteil University
- Saint-Denis-Université station, a station of Line 13 serving Paris 8 University

==== Rennes ====
- Villejean-Université, a Line A metro station serving the University of Rennes

==== Toulouse ====
- Mirail–Université, a Line A metro station serving the University of Toulouse-Jean Jaurès
- Faculté de Pharmacie, a Line B metro station serving the north of the University of Toulouse campus, the Institut national des sciences appliquées de Toulouse and the Institut supérieur de l'aéronautique et de l'espace
- Université Paul Sabatier, a Line B metro and Téléo cable car station serving the University of Toulouse campus

==== Other ====
- Nanterre-Université station, a railway station in Nanterre
- Neuville-Université station, a railway station in Neuville-sur-Oise

=== Germany ===
- Ruhr-Universität, a light rail station serving the Ruhr University Bochum
- Universität/Markt station, a light rail station in Bonn, Germany
- Dortmund University station, a local railway station serving the North Campus of the Technical University of Dortmund in Dortmund, Germany
- Universität Ost/Botanischer Garten, a light rail station in Düsseldorf.
- Universität Essen station, a light rail station serving the Essen campus of the University of Duisburg-Essen
- Universität Station, a light rail station of the Cologne Stadtbahn serving the main campus of the University of Cologne
- Leibniz Universität, a light rail station serving the main campus of Leibniz University Hannover on the C line of the Hanover Stadtbahn in Hanover, Germany
- Universität station (Munich U-Bahn), a rapid transit station in Munich, Germany
- Stuttgart University station, a local railway station in Vaihingen, Stuttgart, Germany

=== Greece ===
- Panepistimio metro station (Athens), a rapid transit station serving the National and Kapodistrian University of Athens
- Panepistimio metro station (Thessaloniki), a rapid transit station serving the Aristotle University of Thessaloniki and the University of Macedonia

=== Hungary ===
- Szent Gellért tér – Műegyetem metro station, a metro station serving the Budapest University of Technology and Economics
- Egyetem, a light rail stop serving the University of Debrecen.

=== Italy ===
- Università station, a metro station in Naples serving the University of Naples Federico II and the University of Naples "L'Orientale"

=== Luxembourg ===
- Belval-Université railway station, in Esch-sur-Alzette

=== Netherlands ===
- Tilburg Universiteit railway station, in Tilburg

=== Poland ===
- Nowy Świat-Uniwersytet metro station, in Warsaw

=== Portugal ===
- Cidade Universitária, serving University of Lisbon
- Pólo Universitário, in Porto

=== Russia ===
- Universitet (Moscow Metro), serving Moscow State University, in Moscow

=== Spain ===
- Ciudad Universitaria, serving Complutense University of Madrid and Polytechnic University of Madrid
- Universidad Rey Juan Carlos, serving its namesake University in Móstoles, Madrid.
- Universidad de Alcalá, in Alcalá de Henares, Madrid
- Cantoblanco Universidad, serving Autonomous University of Madrid
- Zona Universitària, serving Polytechnic University of Catalunya and University of Barcelona
- Universitat, serving University of Barcelona’s Central Campus
- Universitat Autònoma, serving the Autonomous University of Barcelona (UAB)
- Vallparadís Universitat, serving the Terrassa campus of the Polytechnic University of Catalonia (UPC)

=== Sweden ===
- Universitetet railway station, serving Stockholm University, in Stockholm
- Universitetet metro station, serving Stockholm University, in Stockholm

=== Turkey ===
==== Istanbul ====
- Boğaziçi Üniversitesi station on the and lines
- Davutpaşa–YTÜ station on the line, serving Yıldız Technical University
- İbn Haldun Üniversitesi station on the line
- Vezneciler station on line, serving Istanbul University
- Halkalı-Üniversite station on line, serving Istanbul Sabahattin Zaim University
- Laleli–İstanbul Üniversitesi station on line
- Fındıklı-Mimar Sinan Üniversitesi station on line
- Üniversite station on line, serving Bezmialem Vakıf University and Istanbul Bilgi University
- Bayrampaşa - Maltepe - Koç Üniversitesi Hastanesi station on line
- Avcılar Merkez-Üniversite Kampüsü station on line
- Hasdal station on line, serving Istanbul University Faculty of Medicine (Çapa) Hospital
- SBÜ Hastanesi station on line, serving University of Health Sciences (Turkey)

==== Ankara ====
- ODTÜ station on M2 line, serving Middle East Technical University
- Başkent Üniversitesi station on M2 line
- Üniversite station on M? line, serving Ankara Yıldırım Beyazıt University

==== İzmir ====
- Dokuz Eylül Üniversitesi Hastanesi station on M1 line
- Ege Üniversitesi station on M1 line
- D.E.Ü. Tınaztepe Kampüsü station on M2 line
- Kâtip Çelebi station on İZBAN, M4 and T3 lines, serving Kâtip Çelebi University
- Kemalpaşa - Üniversite station on M5 line, serving İzmir Democracy University
- Üniversite station on M4 line
- Üniversite station on T2 line

==== Kocaeli ====
- Gebze Teknik Üniversitesi–Fatih railway station on line

==== Bursa ====
- Uludağ Üniversitesi station on M2 line
- Bursa Teknik Üniversitesi / Mimar Sinan station on M2 line

==== Adana ====
- Çukurova Üniversitesi station on M1 line

==== Antalya ====
- Akdeniz Üniversitesi station on T3 line

==== Eskişehir ====
- Osmangazi Üniversitesi station on 3, 4, 7, 12, 26 lines
- Anadolu Üniversitesi station on 1, 3 lines

==== Gaziantep ====
- Gaziantep Üniversitesi station on 1, 3 lines

==== Kayseri ====
- Kayseri Üniversitesi station on T4 line
- Erciyes Üniversitesi station on T2 line

==== Samsun ====
- OMÜ Yurtlar, Eğitim Fakültesi, Yaşam Merkezi, Sağlık Bilimleri, Diş Hekimliği, Tıp Fakültesi, OMÜ Lojmanlar and Eczaneler stations of T1 line, serving Ondokuz Mayıs University

==== Mersin ====
- Üniversite station of Mersin Metro, serving Mersin University

==== Afyonkarahisar ====
- Kocatepe Üni. ANS Kampüsü station of AFRAY, serving Afyon Kocatepe University

=== Ukraine ===
- Universytet (Kharkiv Metro), serving Kharkiv National University, in Kharkiv
- Universytet (Kyiv Metro), serving Taras Shevchenko National University, in Kyiv

=== United Kingdom ===
==== England ====
- University railway station (England), serving the University of Birmingham, in Birmingham
- University Metro station, a light metro station, serving the University of Sunderland
- University of Nottingham tram stop, serving the University of Nottingham, in Nottingham
- Nottingham Trent University tram stop, serving Nottingham Trent University, in Nottingham
- University of Sheffield tram stop, serving the University of Sheffield, in Sheffield
- Sheffield Station / Sheffield Hallam University tram stop, serving Sheffield Hallam University, in Sheffield

==== Northern Ireland ====
- University railway station (Northern Ireland), serving the University of Ulster at Coleraine, in Coleraine

== North America ==
=== Canada ===
==== Alberta ====
===== Calgary =====
- SAIT/AUArts/Jubilee station, a CTrain (light rail) station serving the Southern Alberta Institute of Technology and the Alberta University of the Arts
- University station (Calgary), a CTrain (light rail) station serving the University of Calgary
- Mount Royal University station, a MAX bus rapid transit station serving Mount Royal University

===== Edmonton =====
- University station (Edmonton), a light rail station serving the University of Alberta
- MacEwan station, a light rail station serving Macewan University

==== British Columbia ====
- Production Way–University station, a rapid transit station serving Simon Fraser University in Vancouver

==== Ontario ====
===== Ottawa =====
- uOttawa station, a light rail station serving the University of Ottawa
- Carleton station, a light rail station serving Carleton University

===== Toronto =====
- York University station, a rapid transit station serving York University
- York University GO Station, a former commuter rail station

===== Waterloo =====
- Laurier–Waterloo Park station, a light rail station serving Wilfrid Laurier University
- University of Waterloo station, a light rail station serving the University of Waterloo

==== Quebec ====
===== Longueuil =====
- Longueuil–Université-de-Sherbrooke station, a rapid transit station serving the Université de Sherbrooke

===== Montreal =====
- Berri–UQAM station, a rapid transit station serving the Université du Québec à Montréal
- Guy–Concordia station, a rapid transit station serving Concordia University
- McGill station, a rapid transit station serving McGill University
- Université-de-Montréal station, a rapid transit station serving the Université de Montréal

=== Mexico ===
==== Mexico City ====
- Metro Universidad, a metro station

==== Jalisco ====
- Plaza Universidad station, a Line 2 station connecting with Line 3 through Guadalajara Centro station in Guadalajara
- CUCEI station, a Line 3 metro station serving the University of Guadalajara Center of Exact Sciences and Engineering in Guadalajara
- La Normal station, a Line 3 station serving the Jalisco Normal School in Guadalajara
- CUTLAJO station, a Line 4 station serving the University of Guadalajara in Tlajomulco de Zúñiga
- Ciencias de la Salud station, a Line 6 BRT station serving the University of Guadalajara Center of Health Sciences in Guadalajara
- Centro Cultural Universitario station, a Line 7 BRT station serving the University of Guadalajara Center of Economic and Managerial Sciences, the Matute Remus Polytechnic and Public High School 10 in Zapopan
- ITESO station, a Line 7 BRT station serving the Western Institute of Technology and Higher Education in San Pedro Tlaquepaque

==== Nuevo León ====
- Universidad (Monterrey Metro), a subway station serving the Autonomous University of Nuevo León, in San Nicolás de los Garza

=== United States ===
==== California ====
- Redlands–University station, an Arrow station serving the University of Redlands, in San Bernardino County
- University station (Los Angeles Metro), a light rail station (now renamed Expo Park/USC station) serving the University of Southern California, in Los Angeles
- San Francisco State University Station, a Muni Metro M Line station

==== Florida ====
- University station (Miami-Dade County), a rapid transit station serving the University of Miami, in Coral Gables

==== Illinois ====
- 59th/60th Street University of Chicago station, a commuter rail station serving the University of Chicago
- 95th Street/Chicago State University station, a commuter rail station serving Chicago State University
- UIC–Halsted station, an "L" station serving the University of Illinois at Chicago
- University station (CTA), a former "L" station serving the University of Chicago
- University Park station, a commuter rail station serving Governors State University in University Park

==== Maryland ====
- College Park–University of Maryland station, a metro station in Prince George's County
- Baltimore Arena station (formerly named University Center/Baltimore Street), a light rail station serving the University of Maryland, Baltimore

==== Massachusetts ====
- Northeastern University station, a streetcar stop in Boston

==== New Jersey ====
- Cooper Street–Rutgers University station, a light rail station in Camden
- Montclair State University station, a commuter rail station in Little Falls

==== New York ====
- 116th Street–Columbia University (IRT Broadway–Seventh Avenue Line), a subway station in Manhattan, New York City
- Eighth Street–New York University (BMT Broadway Line), a subway station in Manhattan, New York City
- University station (Buffalo Metro Rail), a light metro station serving the University at Buffalo, in Buffalo
- University Heights station, a commuter rail station in the Bronx, New York City

==== North Carolina ====
- University City Station, a light rail and bus station serving the University of North Carolina at Charlotte

==== Ohio ====
- Cedar–University station, a rapid transit station serving Case Western Reserve University, in Cleveland
- Little Italy–University Circle station, a rapid transit station serving the University Circle neighborhood, in Cleveland

==== Pennsylvania ====
- Penn Medicine Station (formerly called University City), a regional rail station in Philadelphia
- Temple University station, a regional rail station in Philadelphia
- Drexel Station at 30th Street (Formerly 30th Street Station), an underground subway and light rail station.

==== Texas ====
- TSU/UH Athletics District station, a METROrail station in Houston
- UH–Downtown station, a METROrail station in Houston
- UH South/University Oaks station, a METROrail station in Houston
- University, an El Paso Streetcar stop
- University of Dallas station, a DART light rail station in Irving
- UNT Dallas station, a DART light rail station in Dallas
- UT Dallas station, a DART Silver Line station in Richardson

==== Utah ====
- University Medical Center station, a TRAX light rail station in Salt Lake City
- University South Campus station, a TRAX light rail station in Salt Lake City

==== Virginia ====
- Virginia Square-GMU station, a metro station serving the George Mason University-Mason Square (Arlington Campus)
- Ballston-MU station, a metro station serving Marymount University-Ballston Center
- West Falls Church-VT station, a metro station in Falls Church, serving Virginia Tech Northern Virginia Center
- Vienna-Fairfax/GMU station, a metro station in Vienna, serving George Mason University's main campus
- Potomac Yard-VT station, a metro station serving Virginia Tech Innovation Campus in Alexandria

==== Washington ====
- U District station, a light rail station in Seattle
- University of Washington station, a light rail station in Seattle
- Symphony station, a light rail station in Seattle (formerly named University Street station, itself named after the original University of Washington location)

==== Washington, D.C. ====
- NoMa–Gallaudet U station, a metro station serving Gallaudet University
- Shaw–Howard University station, a metro station serving Howard University
- Brookland-CUA station, a metro station serving Catholic University of America
- Tenleytown–AU station, a metro station serving American University
- Van Ness–UDC station, a metro station serving University of the District of Columbia
- Foggy Bottom–GWU station, a metro station serving George Washington University

== Oceania ==
=== Australia ===
==== New South Wales ====
- Macquarie University railway station, a metro station in Sydney
- UNSW Anzac Parade, a light rail stop on the L3 Kingsford Line in Sydney
- UNSW High Street, a light rail stop on the L2 Randwick Line in Sydney
- Warabrook railway station, formerly known as 'Warabrook (University)' on official maps and signage a railway station on the Hunter Line of the Newcastle suburban railway network

==== Queensland ====
- Gold Coast University Hospital light rail station
- Griffith University busway station, in Brisbane
- Griffith University light rail station, in Gold Coast
- QUT Gardens Point ferry wharf, in Brisbane
- QUT Kelvin Grove busway station, in Brisbane
- University of the Sunshine Coast bus station
- UQ Lakes busway station, in Brisbane
- UQ St Lucia ferry wharf, in Brisbane

==== South Australia ====
- University, a light rail stop on the Glenelg tram line in Adelaide

==== Victoria ====
- Melbourne University tram stop, a tram terminus in Melbourne

==== Western Australia ====
- Curtin University bus station, in Perth

=== New Zealand ===
- Universities, a rapid transit bus station connected by the NX2 in Auckland.

== South America ==
=== Colombia ===
- University station (Medellín), an urban train station serving the University of Antioquia, in Medellín

=== Ecuador ===
- Universidad Central Station (Quito), a metro station serving the Central University of Ecuador, in Quito.

=== Chile ===
- Universidad Católica (Santiago), a metro station serving the Universidad Católica de Chile, in Santiago.
- Universidad de Chile (Santiago), a metro station serving the Universidad de Chile, in Santiago
- Universidad de Santiago (Santiago), a metro station serving the Universidad de Santiago de Chile (USACH) in Santiago

== See also ==
- Universidad station (disambiguation)
- University (disambiguation)
- College station (disambiguation)
