= Daxuecheng Station =

Daxuecheng Station (大学城站), University Town Station, Higher Education Mega Center Station or related may refer to:

- Daxuecheng station (Chongqing Rail Transit)
- Daxuecheng station (Jinan Metro)
- Daxuecheng station (Tianjin Metro)
- University Town Station (Shenzhen)
- University Town Station (Kunming)
- Higher Education Mega Center South Station (Guangzhou)
- Higher Education Mega Center North Station (Guangzhou)
- Liangxiang University Town Station (Beijing)
- Liangxiang University Town North Station (Beijing)
- Liangxiang University Town West Station (Beijing)
- Songjiang University Town Station (Shanghai)
