= Universitet =

Universitet may refer to:

- Universitet (Moscow Metro)
- Universytet (Kharkiv Metro)
- Universytet (Kiev Metro)

== See also ==
- University Station (disambiguation)
