= Prospekt Vernadskogo =

Prospekt Vernadskogo may refer to:

- Prospekt Vernadskogo District, a district of Moscow, Russia
- Prospekt Vernadskogo (Sokolnicheskaya line), a station on the Moscow Metro, Line 1
- Prospekt Vernadskogo (Bolshaya Koltsevaya line), a station on the Moscow Metro, Line 11
