= Shijing station =

Shijing station may refer to:

- Shijing station (Guangzhou Metro), a metro station in Guangzhou, Guangdong, China
- Shijing station (Shenzhen Metro), a metro station in Shenzhen, Guangdong, China
