= Henrik Vorum =

Biologist

Henrik Vorum is a clinical professor at Aalborg University Hospital, specializing in eye disorders.

Vorum's research into the identification of specific proteins by the use of mass spectroscopy has been named the Vorum's silver staining procedure. He has focused on cancer research and cell biology. Vorum has participated in a major research project on the diagnosing of patients with hypothermia.

Over the course of his career, Vorum has received both grants and prizes for his scientific contributions.

== Education ==
Vorum received his diploma of doctor of medicine and PhD in 1994 from Aarhus University. In 1998, Henrik Vorum became an associate professor at Aarhus. With his thesis "Reversible ligand binding to human serum albumin – theoretical and clinical aspects", Vorum earned his higher doctoral degree in 1999.

Vorum obtained his specialisation in ophthalmology in 2006.
