= College Park station =

College Park station may refer to:

- College Park station (MARTA), a MARTA station in Atlanta, Georgia
- College Park station (California), a Caltrain station in College Park, California
- College Park–University of Maryland station, a Washington Metro and MARC station in College Park, Maryland

== See also ==
- College Station (disambiguation)
- University station (disambiguation)
