= Arts College station =

Arts College station may refer to:

- Arts College railway station, a railway station in Secunderabad, Telangana, India
- Arts College station (Hohhot Metro), a rapid transit station in Hohhot, Inner Mongolia, China

== See also ==
- College station (disambiguation)
