= Panepistimio metro station =

Panepistimio metro station can refer to two metro stations in Greece:

- Panepistimio metro station (Athens), part of the Athens Metro system, which entered service in 2000
- Panepistimio metro station (Thessaloniki), part of the Thessaloniki Metro system, which entered service in 2024

== See also ==
- University station (disambiguation)
