= Prospekt Vernadskogo (Bolshaya Koltsevaya line) =

Moscow Metro station

Prospekt Vernadskogo Проспект Вернадского
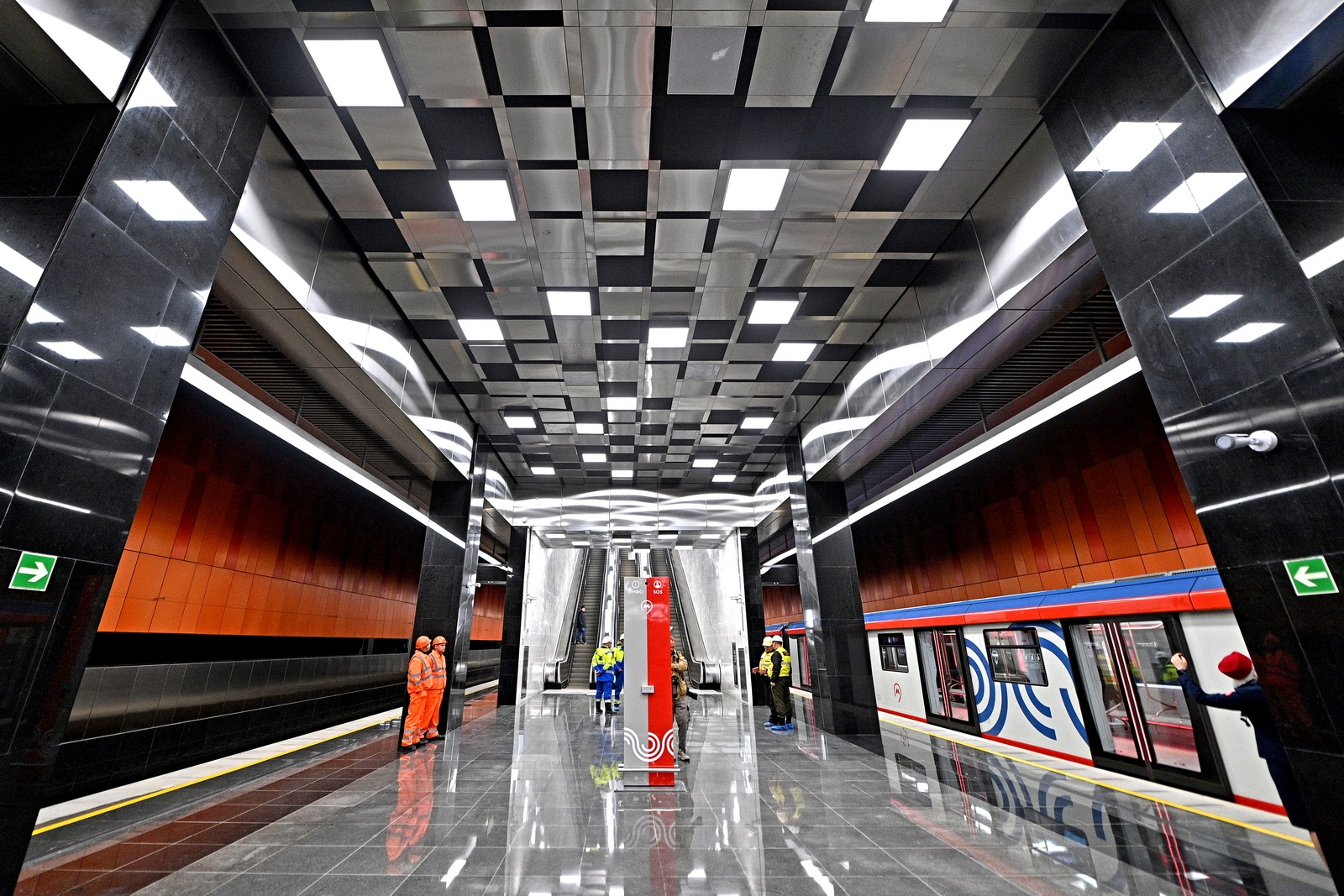

General information
- Location: Prospekt Vernadskogo District, Western Administrative Okrug; Moscow; Russia
- Coordinates: 55.6778°N 37.5050°E
- System: Moscow Metro station
- Owner: Moskovsky Metropoliten
- Line: Bolshaya Koltsevaya line
- Platforms: 1 island platform
- Tracks: 2

Construction
- Structure type: Shallow column station
- Depth: 16 metres (52 ft)
- Platform levels: 1

History
- Opened: 7 December 2021; 4 years ago

Services
Preceding station	Moscow Metro	Following station
Novatorskaya anticlockwise / outer	Bolshaya Koltsevaya line	Michurinsky Prospekt clockwise / inner
Yugo-Zapadnaya towards Potapovo	Sokolnicheskaya line transfer at Prospekt Vernadskogo	Universitet towards Bulvar Rokossovskogo
Route map
Bolshaya Koltsevaya line
Location
- Location within Moscow Metro

Prospekt Vernadskogo (Russian: Проспект Вернадского) is a station on the Bolshaya Koltsevaya line of the Moscow Metro system in Moscow, Russia. It was opened on 7 December 2021 as part of the section between Mnyovniki and Kakhovskaya. Passengers can transfer to the Prospekt Vernadskogo station on the Sokolnicheskaya line.
