= Guangyangcheng station =

Beijing Subway station

Guangyang Cheng 广阳城
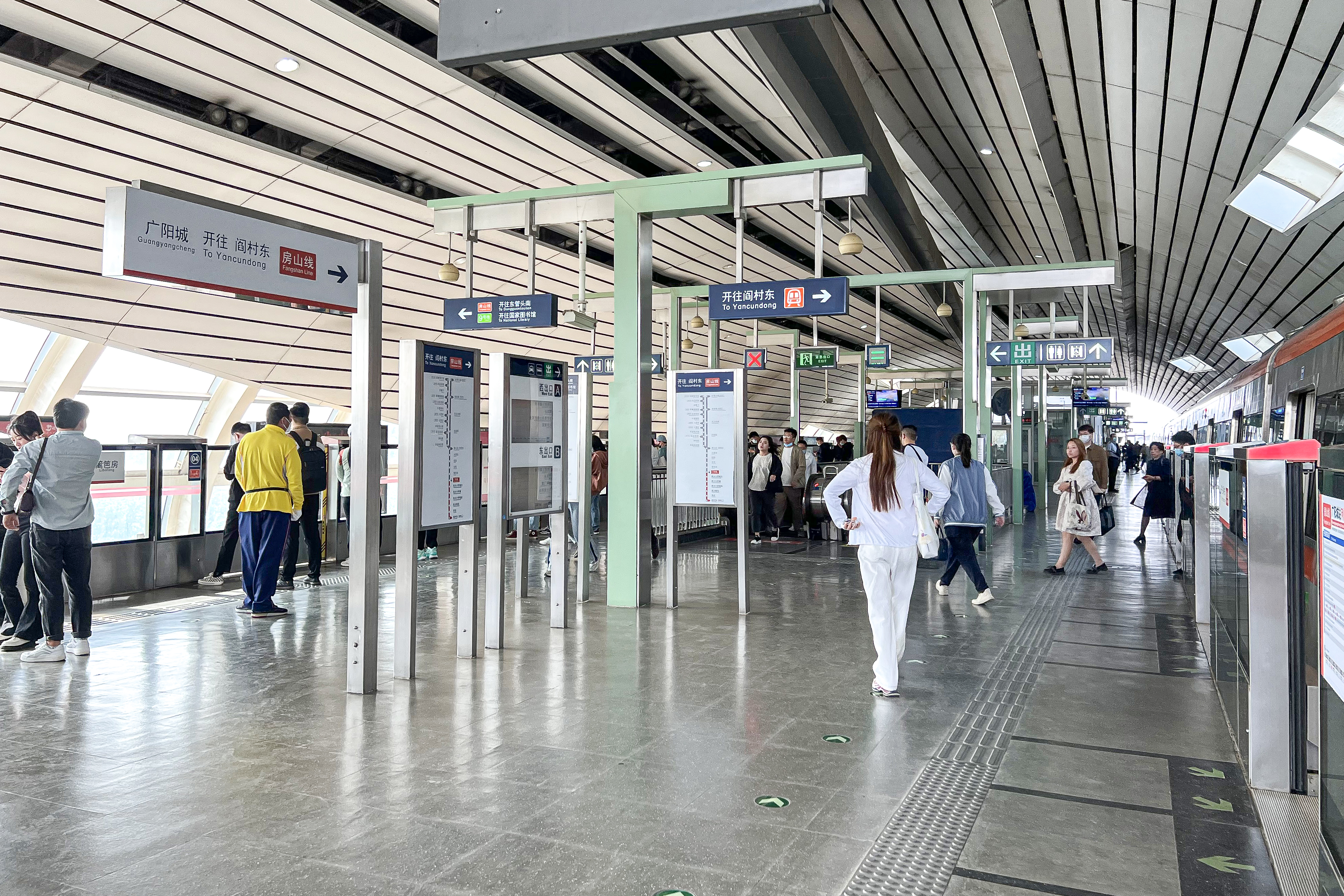
- Platform

General information
- Location: Donghuan Road (东环路) south of Changyang Road (长阳路); Changyang, Fangshan District, Beijing; China
- Coordinates: 39.7480°N 116.1850°E
- Operator: Beijing Mass Transit Railway Operation Corporation Limited
- Line: Fangshan line
- Platforms: 2 (1 island platform)
- Tracks: 2

Construction
- Structure type: Elevated
- Accessible: Yes

History
- Opened: December 30, 2010; 15 years ago

Services
Preceding station	Beijing Subway	Following station
Libafang towards Dongguantounan	Fangshan line	Liangxiang Univ. Town North towards Yancundong
Location
- Location within Beijing

Guangyang Cheng station (simplified Chinese: 广阳城站; traditional Chinese: 廣陽城站; pinyin: Guǎngyáng Chéng Zhàn) is a station on Fangshan Line of the Beijing Subway.

== Station layout ==
The station has an elevated island platform.

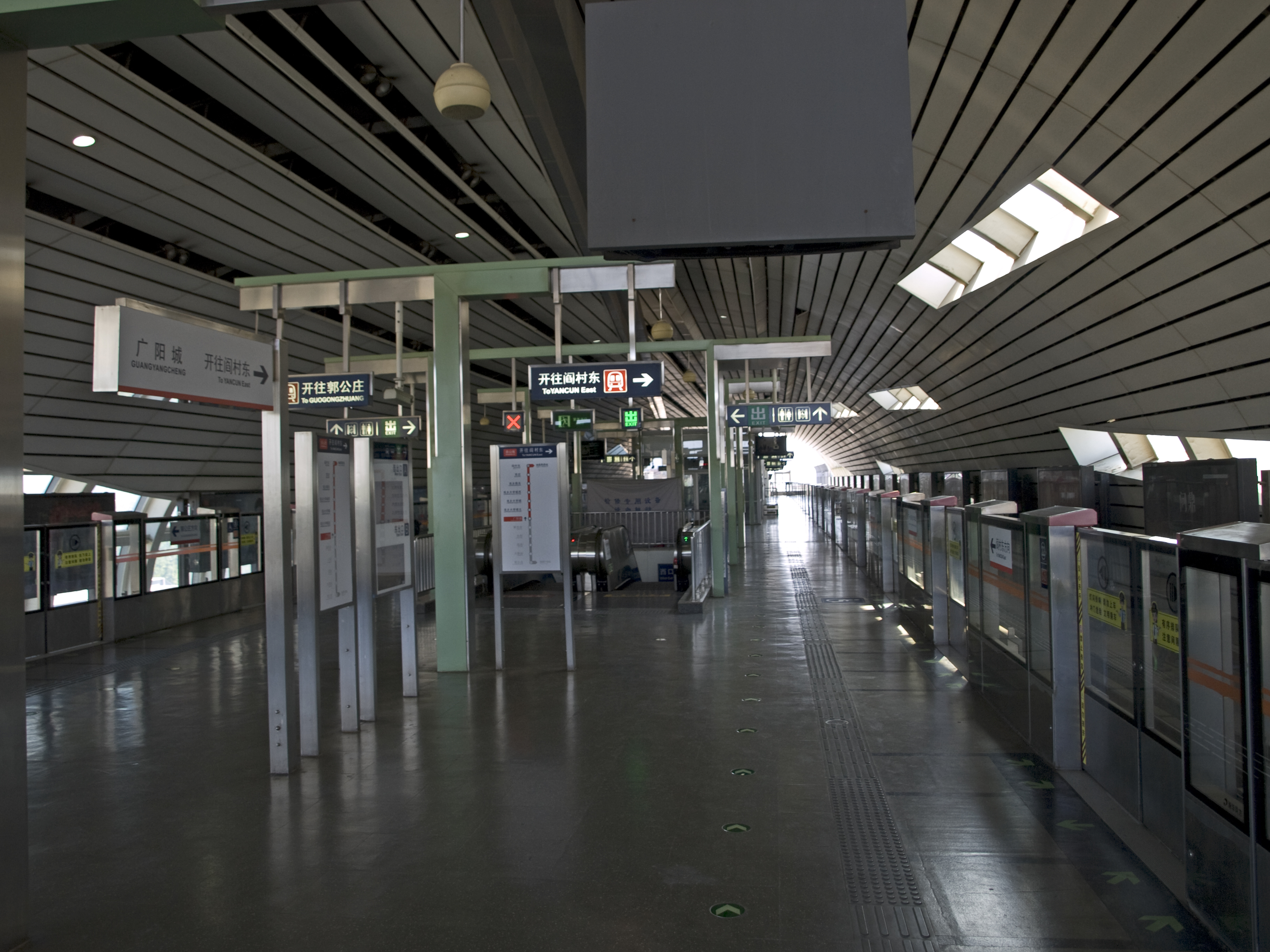
Platform before the north extension of Fangshan Line, in October 2018

== Exits ==
There are 4 exits, lettered A1, A2, B1, and B2. Exits A1 and B1 are accessible.
