= Libafang station =

Beijing Subway station

Libafang 篱笆房
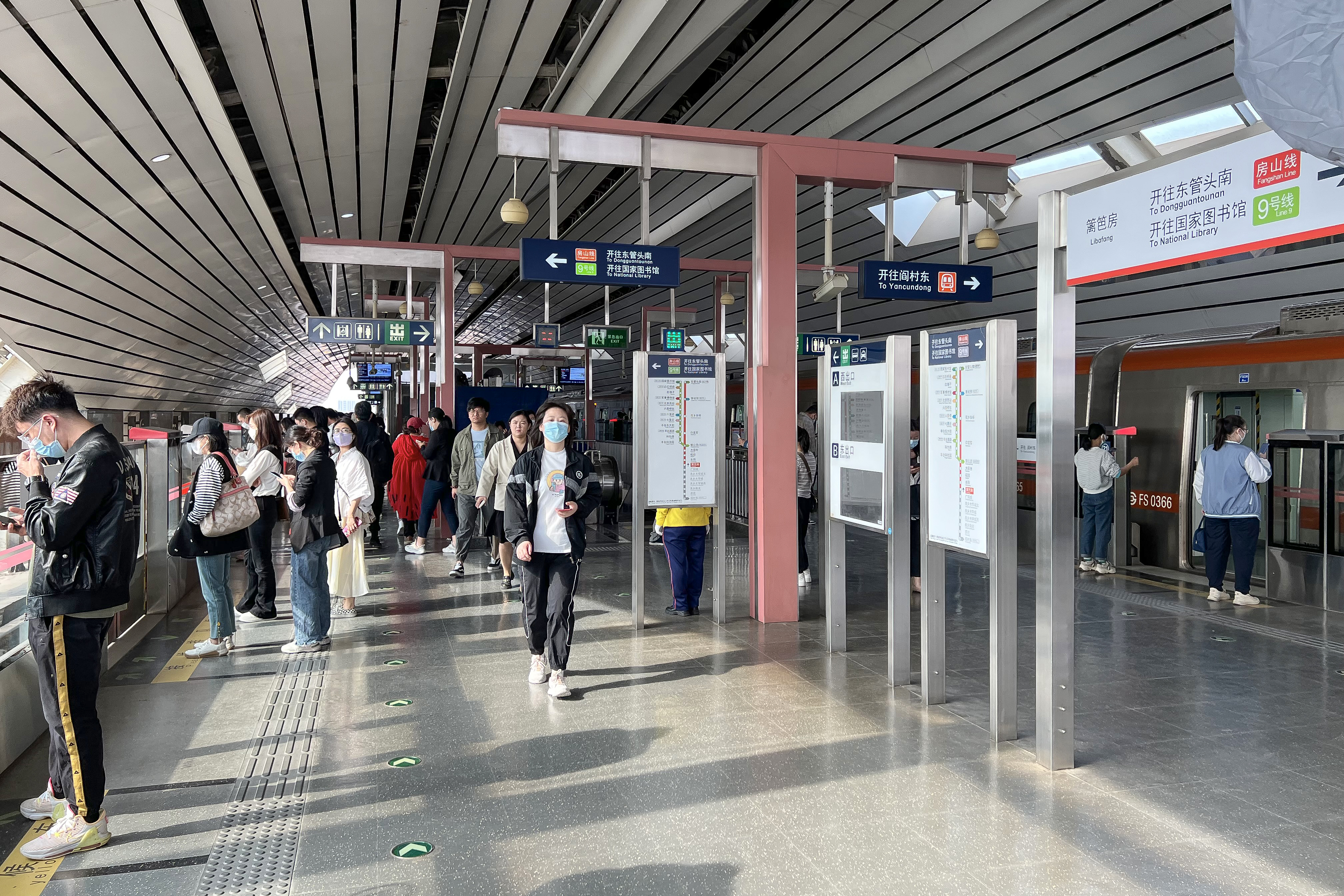
- Platform

General information
- Location: Donghuan Road (东环路); Changyang, Fangshan District, Beijing; China
- Coordinates: 39°45′38″N 116°11′21″E
- Operator: Beijing Mass Transit Railway Operation Corporation Limited
- Line: Fangshan line
- Platforms: 2 (1 island platform)
- Tracks: 2

Construction
- Structure type: Elevated
- Accessible: Yes

History
- Opened: December 30, 2010; 15 years ago

Services
Preceding station	Beijing Subway	Following station
Changyang towards Dongguantounan	Fangshan line	Guangyang Cheng towards Yancundong
Location
- Location within Beijing

Libafang station (simplified Chinese: 篱笆房站; traditional Chinese: 籬笆房站; pinyin: Líbāfáng Zhàn) is a station on Fangshan Line of the Beijing Subway.

== Station layout ==
The station has an elevated island platform.

== Exits ==
There are 4 exits, lettered A1, A2, B1, and B2. Exits A1 and B1 are accessible.
