= Shijing station (Shenzhen Metro) =

Shenzhen Metro Line 16 station

Shijing 石井
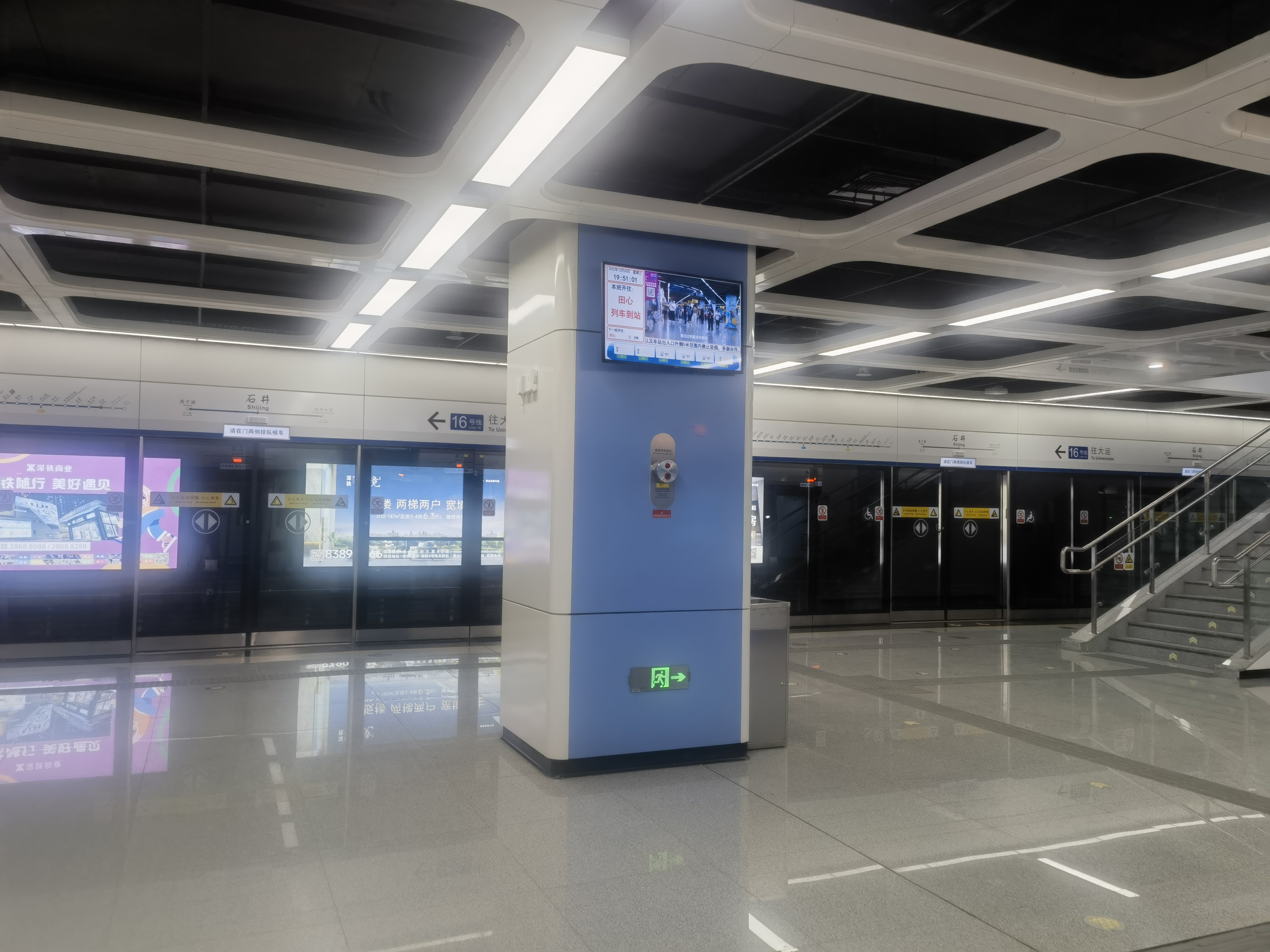
- Platform

Chinese name
- Chinese: 石井
Transcriptions
Standard Mandarin
- Hanyu Pinyin: Shíjǐng
Yue: Cantonese
- Yale Romanization: Sehkjéng
- Jyutping: Sek6 Zeng2

General information
- Location: East of the intersection of Pingshan Jintian Road and Mingcheng Road; Shijing Subdistrict, Pingshan District, Shenzhen, Guangdong; China
- Coordinates: 22°41′39.70″N 114°22′41.30″E
- Operated by: SZMC (Shenzhen Metro Group)
- Line: Line 16
- Platforms: 2 (1 island platform)
- Tracks: 2

Construction
- Structure type: Underground
- Accessible: Yes

History
- Opened: 28 December 2022; 2 years ago

Services
Preceding station	Shenzhen Metro	Following station
Yanzihu towards Yuanshan Xikeng	Line 16	Technology University towards Tianxin
Location

Shijing station (Chinese: 石井; pinyin: Shíjǐng; Cantonese Yale: Sehkjéng) is a station on Line 16 of Shenzhen Metro. It opened on 28 December 2022.

== Station layout ==
The station has an island platform under Pingshan Jintian Road.

G	-	Exits A-D
B1F; Concourse	Lobby	Ticket Machines, Customer Service, Automatic Vending Machines
B2F; Platforms	Platform	16 towards Yuanshan Xikeng (Yanzihu)
B2F; Platforms	Island platform, doors will open on the left
B2F; Platforms	Platform	16 towards Tianxin (Technology University)

== Exits ==
Exit	Destination
Exit A	Pingshan Jintian Road (S), Shijing Community Police Office, Shenzhen Technology University Training Base, Mingcheng Road (W)
Exit B	Pingshan Jintian Road (S), Fire Station, Mingcheng Road (E), Nianci Building, Shijing Community Park
Exit C	Pingshan Jintian Road (N), Hengtang Road, Shijing Community, Luyin South Road, Shenzhen Agricultural Science and Technology Industry Demonstration Park
Exit D	Pingshan Jintian Road (N), Shijing Community Workstation, Shijing Community Neighborhood Committee, Shijing Community Veterans Service Station, Shijing Community Health Service Center, Tongxin Kindergarten
