= College Station =

College station or College Station may refer to:

== Transportation ==
- College station (MetroLink), a St. Louis light rail station in Saint Clair County, Illinois, United States
- College station (PNR), a Philippine National Railways station in Los Baños, Laguna, Philippines
- College railway station (Scotland), a former railway station in Glasgow, Scotland, United Kingdom
- College station (Toronto), a subway station in Toronto, Ontario, Canada
- Du Collège station, a metro station in Montreal, Quebec, Canada

=== Stations with "College" in the name ===
==== United States ====
- 17th Street/SMC station, a light rail station in Santa Monica, California
- 68th Street–Hunter College station, a subway station in Manhattan, New York
- 137th Street–City College station, a subway station in Manhattan, New York
- Allen station (Los Angeles Metro), a light rail station in Los Angeles, California, also signed as Allen/College station
- APU/Citrus College station, a light rail station in Azusa, California
- Bedford Park Boulevard–Lehman College station, a subway station in Bronx, New York
- Boston College station, a light rail station in Newton, Massachusetts
- College Avenue station (Illinois), a commuter rail station in Wheaton, Illinois
- College Bayside station, an automated people mover station in Miami, Florida
- College Boulevard station, a light rail station in Oceanside, California
- College Greens station, a light rail station in Sacramento, California
- College Hill station, a former train station in Beaver Falls, Pennsylvania
- College North station, an automated people mover station in Miami, Florida
- Community College station, a rapid transit station in Boston, Massachusetts
- Cosumnes River College station, a light rail station in Sacramento, California
- Dallas College North Lake Campus station, a light rail station in Irving, Texas
- Delavan/Canisius College station, a light rail station in Buffalo, New York
- Flatbush Avenue–Brooklyn College station, a subway station in Brooklyn, New York
- Franklin Avenue–Medgar Evers College station, a subway station in Brooklyn, New York
- GateWay Community College station, a light rail station in Phoenix, Arizona
- Hālaulani station, a light metro station in Pearl City, Hawaii, also known as Leeward Community College station
- Medford/Tufts station, an under-construction light rail station in Medford, Massachusetts, originally planned to be named College Avenue station
- Palomar College station, a bus and train station in San Marcos, California
- Pierce College station, a bus rapid transit station in Los Angeles, California
- President Street–Medgar Evers College station, a subway station in Brooklyn, New York
- Red Rocks College station, a light rail station in Lakewood, Colorado
- Valley College station, a bus rapid transit station in Los Angeles, California
- Vermont/Santa Monica station, a rapid transit station in Los Angeles, California, also known L.A. City College station
- Veterans Way/College Avenue station, a regional transportation center in Tempe, Arizona

==== India ====
- Arts College railway station, in Secunderabad, Telangana
- Dharampeth College metro station, a rapid transit station in Maharashtra
- Garware College metro station, a rapid transit station in Pune
- Hindu College railway station, a commuter rail station in Chennai
- JNTU College metro station, a rapid transit station in Hyderabad
- Kilpauk Medical College metro station, a rapid transit station in Chennai
- Maharaja's College metro station, a rapid transit station in Kochi
- National College metro station, a rapid transit station in Bengaluru
- Osmania Medical College metro station, a rapid transit station in Hyderabad
- Pachaiyappa's College metro station, a rapid transit station in Chennai
- Sir Theagaraya College metro station, a rapid transit station in Chennai

==== China ====
- Arts College station (Hohhot Metro), a rapid transit station in Hohhot, Mongolia
- Chengdu Medical College station, a rapid transit station in Kochi,
- The Police College station, a rapid transit station in Chengdu,
- Southeast University Chengxian College station, a rapid transit station in Nanjing,

==== Elsewhere ====
- Dong-Pusan College station, a rapid transit station in Busan, South Korea, now named Witbansong station
- Durham College Oshawa GO station a commuter rail station in Oshawa, Ontario, Canada
- Gimhae College station, a light metro station in Busan, South Korea
- Humber College station, an under construction light rail station in Toronto, Canada
- Islamia College railway station, in Pakistan
- Stadium–Songdam College station, an automated people mover station in Cheoin-gu, South Korea
- Urdu College railway station, an abandoned railway station in Karachi, Pakistan
- VCC–Clark station, a rapid transit station in Vancouver, Canada, named after nearby Vancouver Community College

== Places ==
- College Station, Arkansas, United States
- College Station, Texas, United States

== Institutions ==
- Atlantic College Lifeboat Station, in Atlantic College, South Wales

== See also ==
- College (disambiguation)
- City College station (disambiguation)
- College Avenue station (disambiguation)
- College Park station (disambiguation)
- University Station (disambiguation)
- Category: College radio stations
