= Wenxing station =

Railway station in Chengdu, China

Wenxing 文星

General information
- Location: Shuangliu District, Chengdu, Sichuan; China
- Coordinates: 30.5532°N 103.9884°E
- Operated by: Chengdu Metro Limited
- Line: Line 8
- Platforms: 2 (2 side platforms)

Other information
- Station code: 0830

History
- Opened: 18 December 2020

Services
Preceding station	Chengdu Metro	Following station
Sichuan University Jiang'an Campus towards Guilong Road	Line 8	Lianhua towards Longgang
Location

Wenxing Station is a metro station at Chengdu, Sichuan, China. It was opened on December 18, 2020 with the opening of Chengdu Metro Line 8.
