= Technology University station =

Shenzhen Metro Line 16 station

Technology University 技术大学
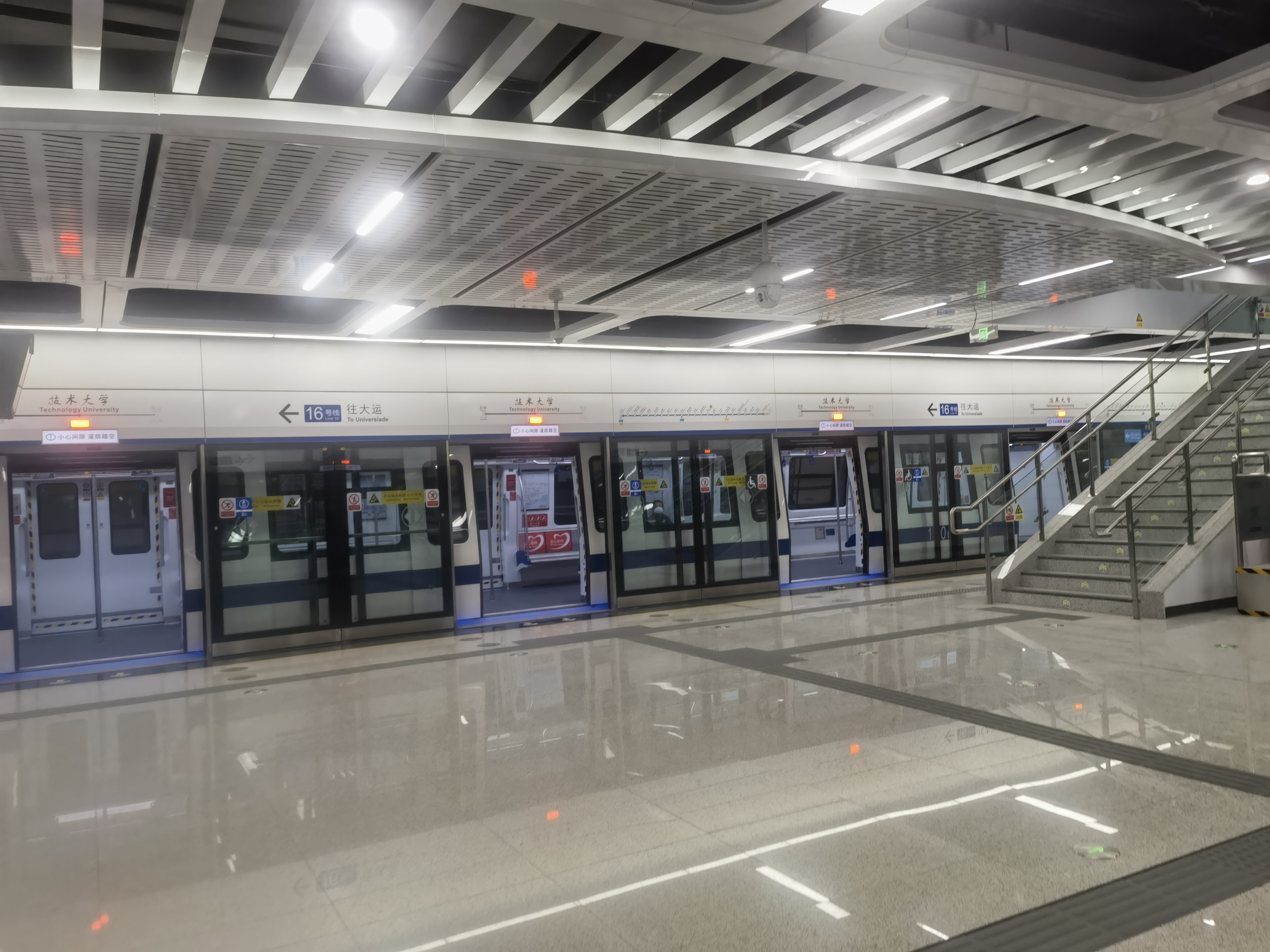
- Platform

Chinese name
- Traditional Chinese: 技術大學
- Simplified Chinese: 技术大学
Transcriptions
Standard Mandarin
- Hanyu Pinyin: Jìshù Dàxué
Yue: Cantonese
- Yale Romanization: Geihseuht Daaihhohk
- Jyutping: Gei6 Seot6 Daai6 Hok6

General information
- Location: Intersection of Lantian Road and Chuangjing Road; Shijing Subdistrict, Pingshan District, Shenzhen, Guangdong; China
- Coordinates: 22°42′03″N 114°23′46″E
- Operated by: SZMC (Shenzhen Metro Group)
- Line: Line 16
- Platforms: 2 (1 island platform)
- Tracks: 2

Construction
- Structure type: Underground
- Accessible: Yes

History
- Opened: 28 December 2022; 2 years ago

Services
Preceding station	Shenzhen Metro	Following station
Shijing towards Yuanshan Xikeng	Line 16	Tianxin Terminus
Location

Technology University station (simplified Chinese: 技术大学; traditional Chinese: 技術大學; pinyin: Jìshù Dàxué; Cantonese Yale: Geihseuht Daaihhohk) is a station on Line 16 of Shenzhen Metro. It opened on 28 December 2022.

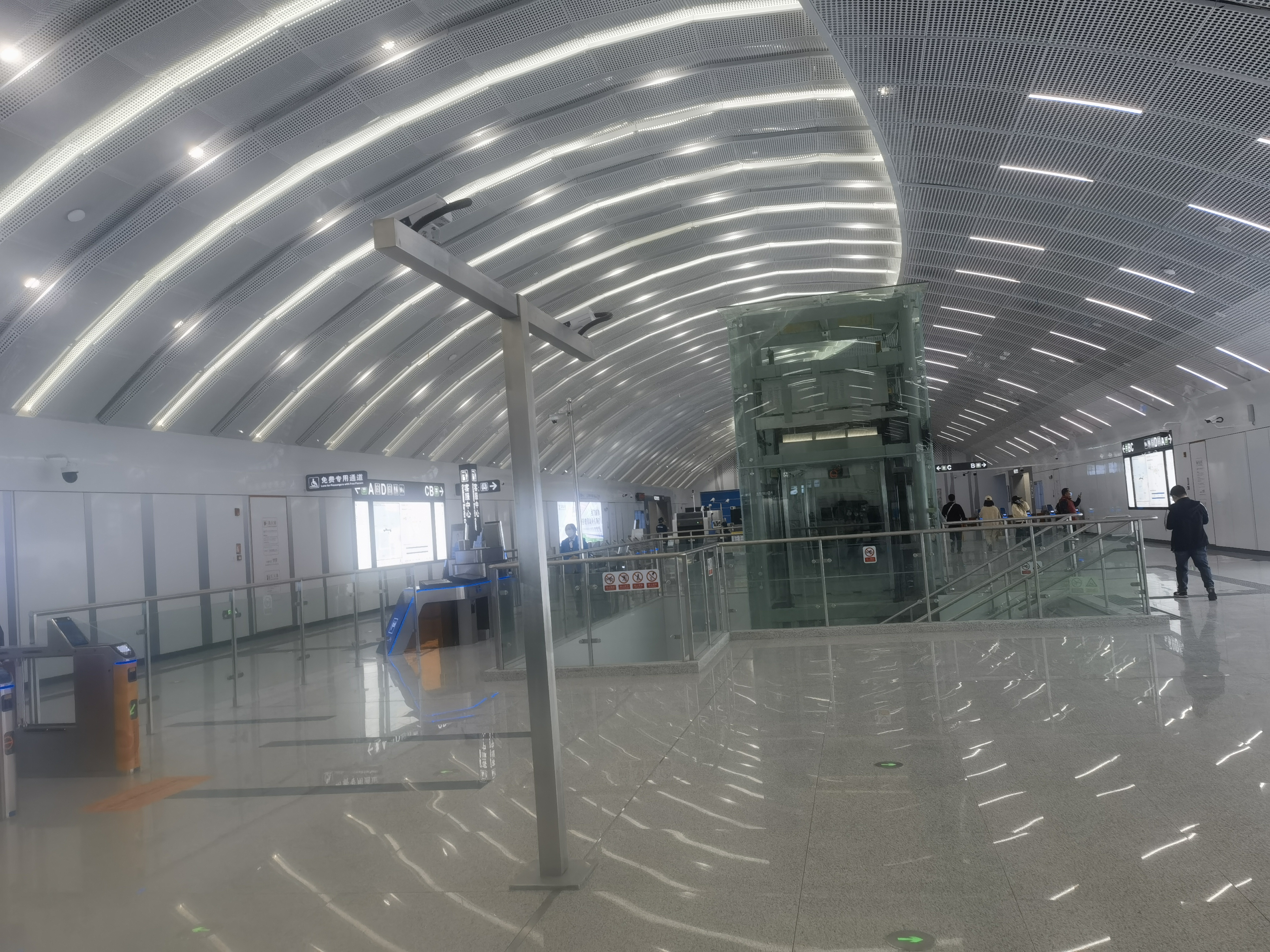
Concourse

== Station layout ==
The station has an island platform under Lantian Road.

G	-	Exits A-D
B1F; Concourse	Lobby	Ticket Machines, Customer Service, Automatic Vending Machines
B2F; Platforms	Platform	16 towards Yuanshan Xikeng (Shijing)
B2F; Platforms	Island platform, doors will open on the left
B2F; Platforms	Platform	16 towards Tianxin (terminus)

== Exits ==
Exit		Destination
Exit A		Chuangjing Road (W), Pingshan Campus of Shenzhen Third Vocational and Technical School, East Campus of Shenzhen Senior High School (Group)
Exit B		Lantian Road (S), Shijing Police Station, Ma'anling Laboratory of Shenzhen Technology University
Exit C		Lantian Road (N), Shenzhen Technology University, Zhuyun Garden
Exit D	D1	Lantian Road (N), Shenzhen Technology University
Exit D	D2	Lantian Road (N), Shenzhen Technology University
Exit D	D3	Lantian Road (N), Shenzhen Technology University

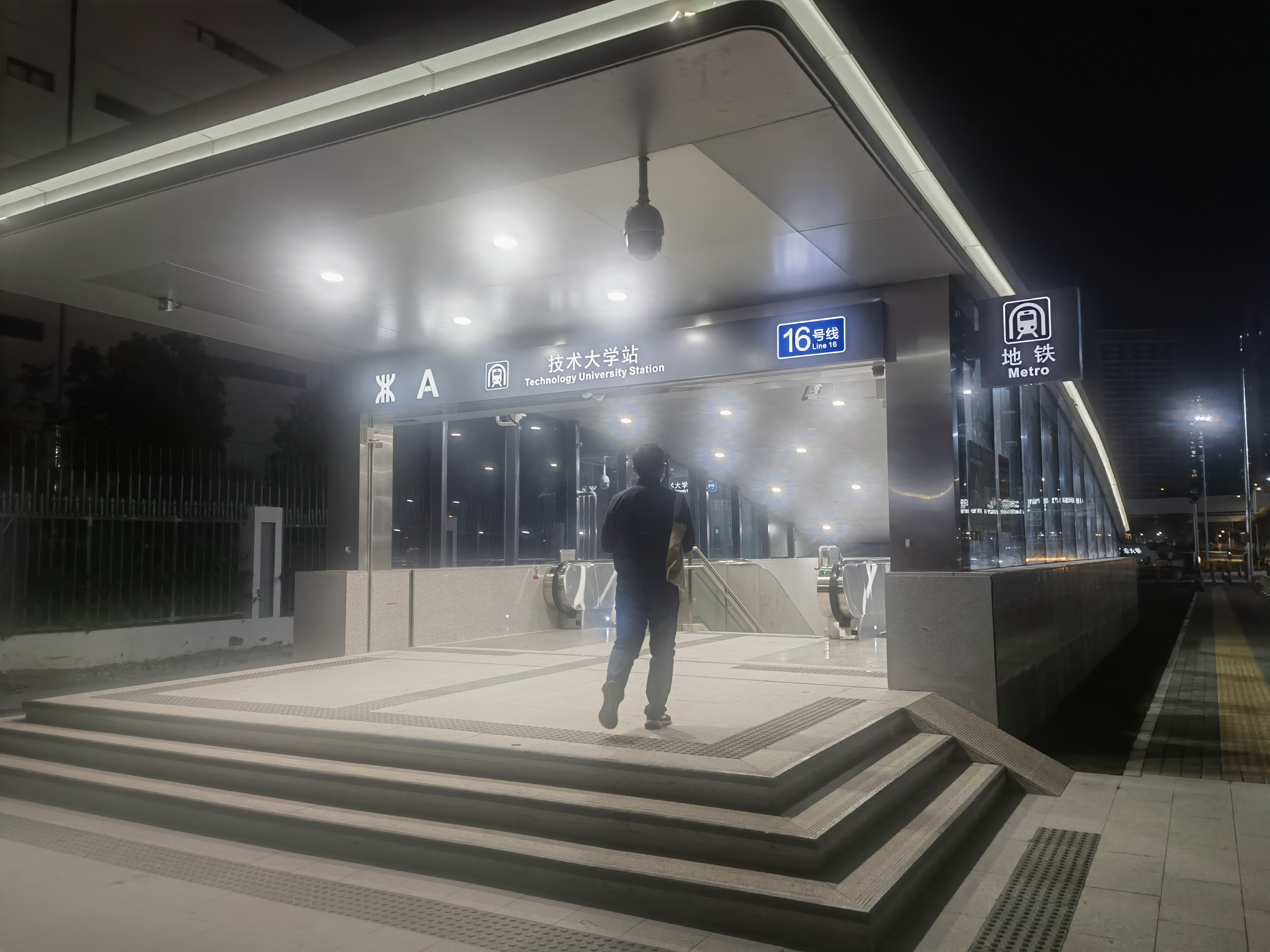
Entrance A

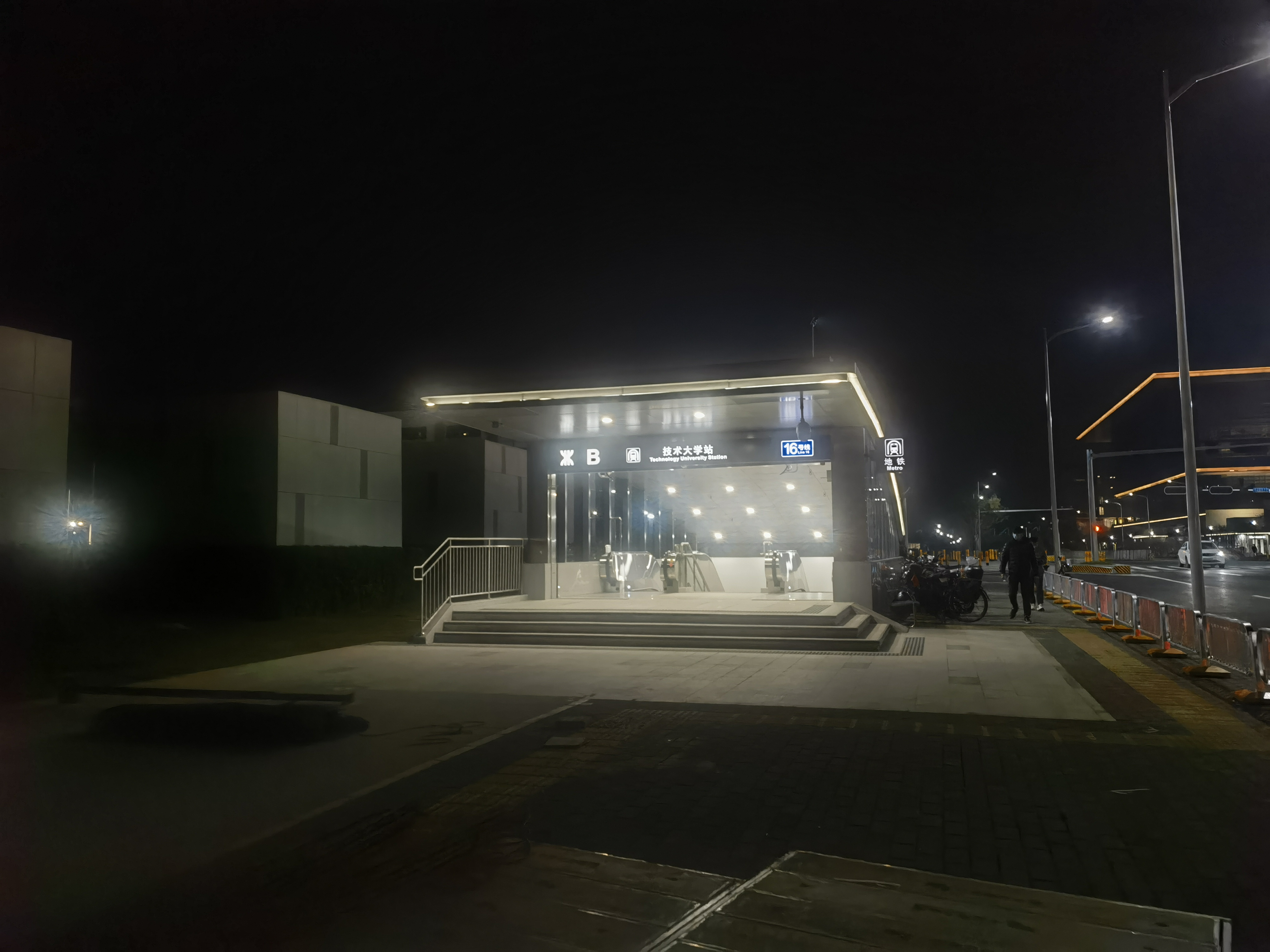
Entrance B

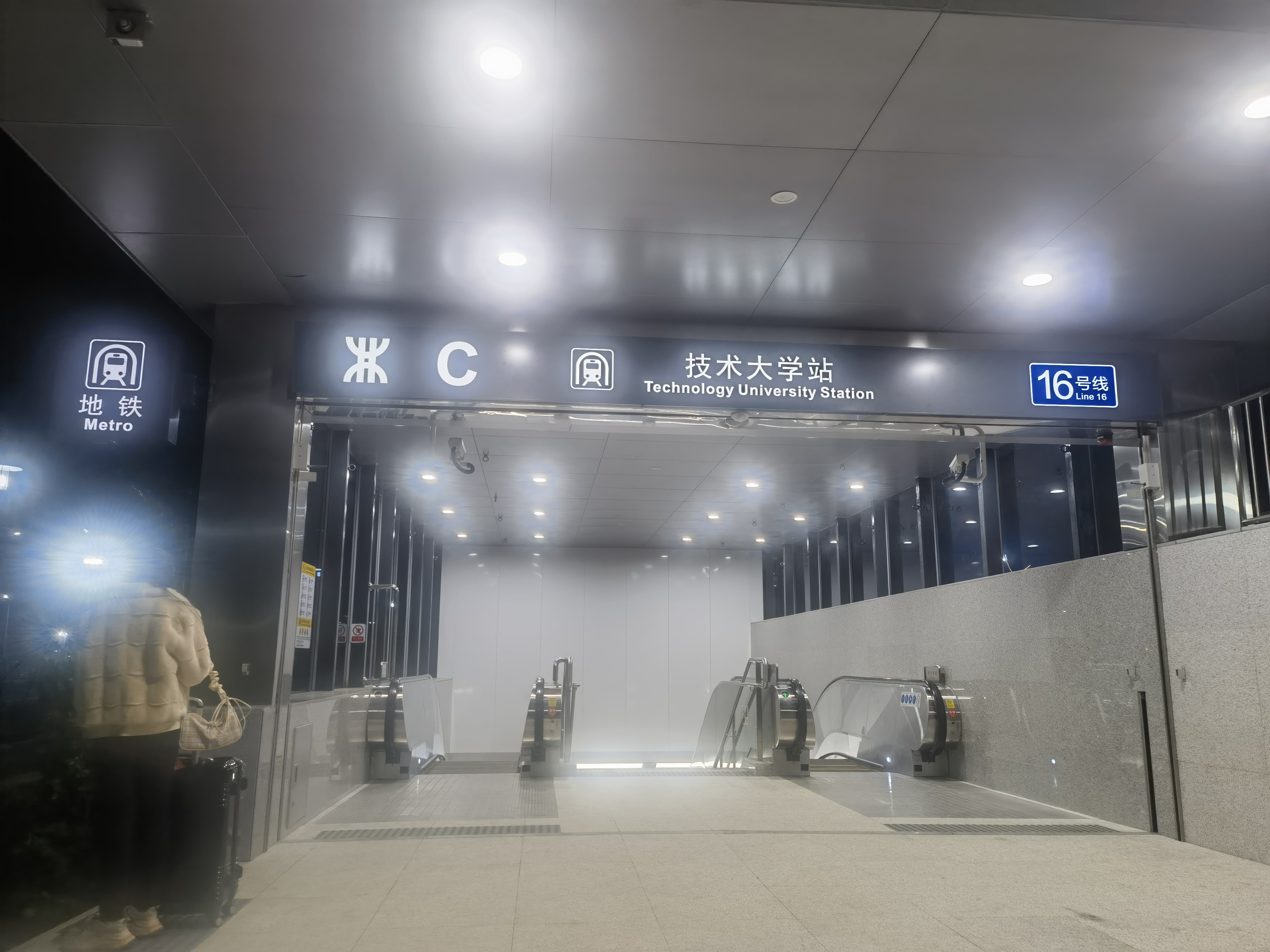
Entrance C
