= Universidad station =

Universidad station may refer to:

- Universidad station (Medellín), Colombia
- Universidad metro station (Mexico City), Mexico
- Universidad station (Puerto Rico), in San Juan
- Universidad metro station (San Nicolás de los Garza), Nuevo León, Mexico
- Universidad Católica metro station, Santiago, Chile
- Universidad Central metro station, Quito, Ecuador
- Universidad de Chile metro station, Santiago, Chile
- Universidad de Santiago metro station, Santiago, Chile
- Universidad Nacional (TransMilenio), a BRT station in Bogotá, Colombia
- Universidad Rey Juan Carlos (Madrid Metro), Spain
- Amín Abel metro station, a metro station in Santo Domingo, Dominican Republic, previously called Universidad
- Universidad, a station on the Granada Metro
- Universidad, a station on the Málaga Metro
- Universidad, a station on the Maracaibo Metro
- Universidades (TransMilenio), a BRT station in Bogotá, Colombia

== See also ==
- Ciudad Universitaria (disambiguation), for other stations of similar name
- University Station (disambiguation)
- Universitat (Barcelona Metro), Spain
- Universität station (Munich U-Bahn), Germany
