= Sichuan University Jiang'an Campus station =

Metro station in Chengdu, China

Coordinates: 30.5576°N 104.0047°E

Sichuan University Jiang'an Campus 川大江安校区
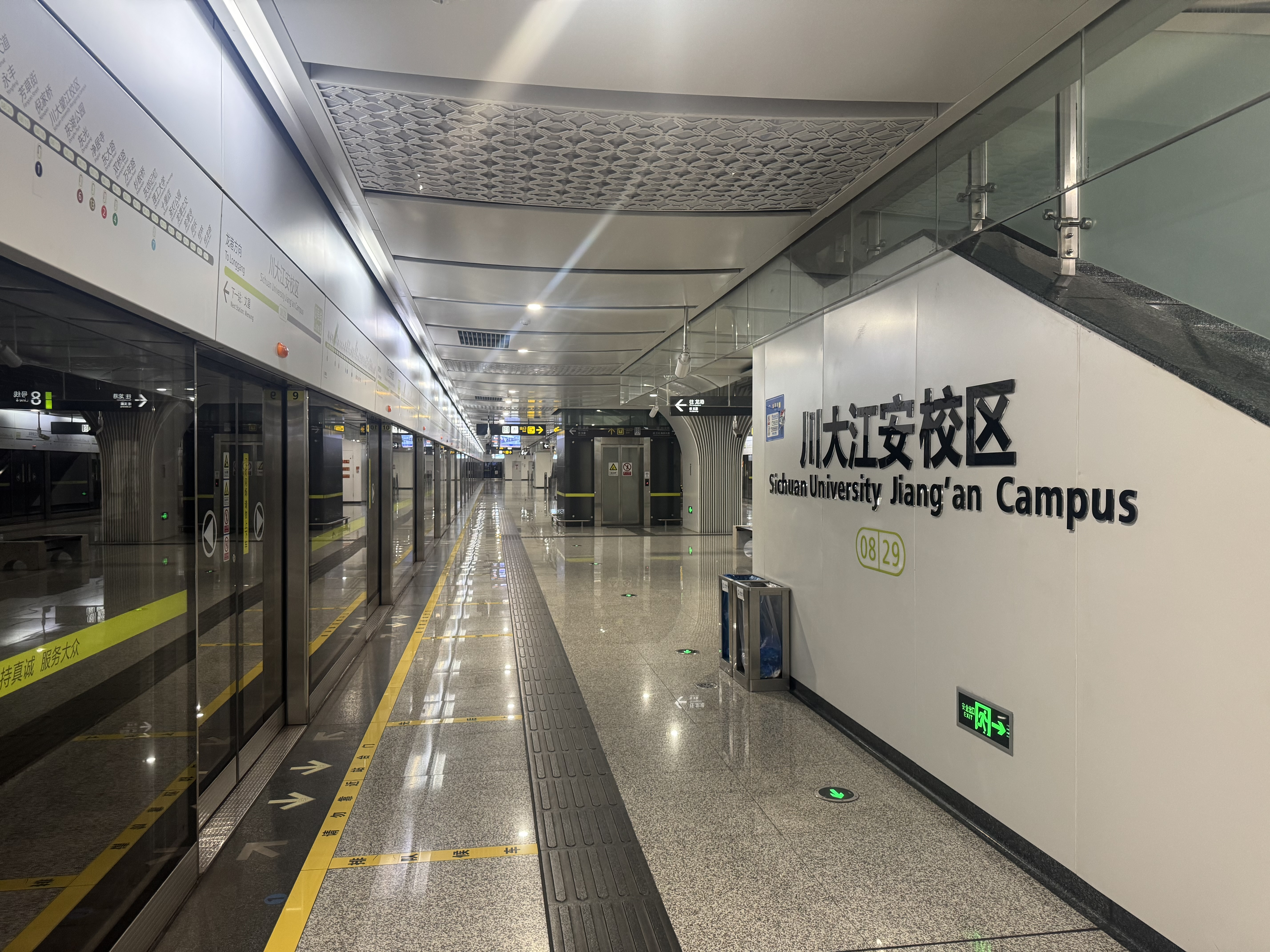

General information
- Location: Shuangliu District, Chengdu, Sichuan; China
- Operated by: Chengdu Metro Limited
- Line: Line 8
- Platforms: 2 (1 island platform)

Other information
- Station code: 0829

History
- Opened: 18 December 2020

Services
Preceding station	Chengdu Metro	Following station
Zhujiang Road towards Guilong Road	Line 8	Wenxing towards Longgang
Location

Sichuan University Jiang'an Campus Station is a metro station at Chengdu, Sichuan, China. It was opened on December 18, 2020 with the opening of Chengdu Metro Line 8. The station serves the nearby Jiang'an Campus of Sichuan University.
