= AFRAY =

Rail line in Afyonkarahisar, Turkey

Overview
- Owner: Turkish State Railways

Service
- Type: Commuter rail

History
- Planned opening: 2026

Technical
- Line length: 17 km (11 mi)
- Track gauge: 1,435 mm (4 ft 8 1/2 in) standard gauge

AFRAY is a commuter rail line under construction in Afyonkarahisar, Turkey. It will be 17 km (11 mi) long, the line will join the other the commuter rail systems in the country, İZBAN, Marmaray, Başkentray and Gaziray.
