= City College station =

City College station may refer to:

- City College station (Sacramento), a light rail station in Sacramento, California
- City College station (San Diego), a light rail station in San Diego, California
- Ocean Avenue/CCSF Pedestrian Bridge station, a light rail station serving City College of San Francisco, California
- 137th Street–City College station, subway station in New York
