= Prospekt Vernadskogo (Sokolnicheskaya line) =

Moscow Metro station

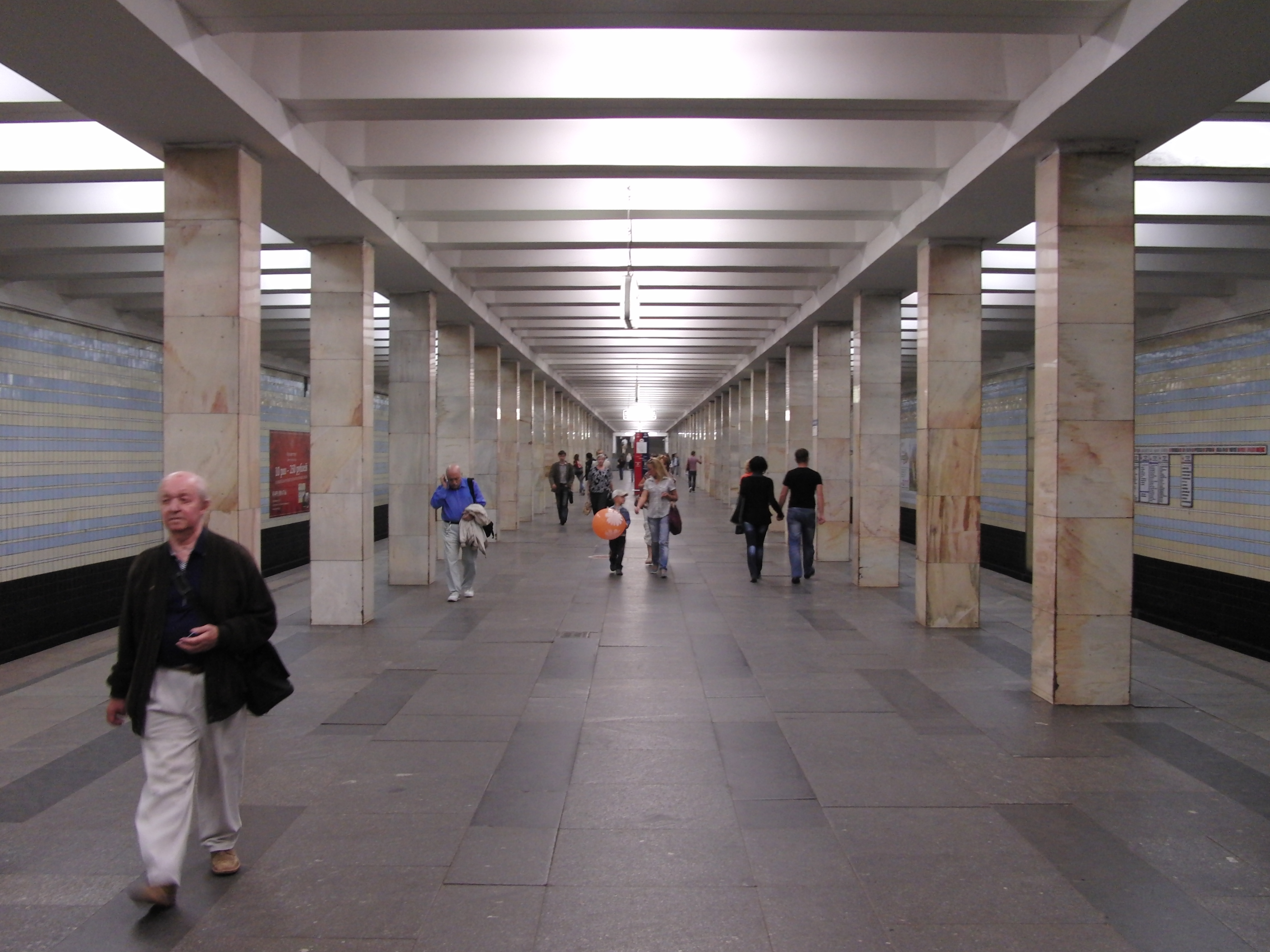

General information
- Location: Prospekt Vernadskogo District, Western Administrative Okrug, Moscow; Russia
- Coordinates: 55.6771°N 37.5060°E
- System: Moscow Metro station
- Owner: Moskovsky Metropoliten
- Line: Sokolnicheskaya line
- Platforms: 1 island platform
- Tracks: 2
- Connections: Bus: 42, 47, 120, 153, 224, 246, 616, 661, 715, 788, 793, 810, 810с, 830, 830с Trolleybus: 34

Construction
- Structure type: Shallow column triple-vault
- Depth: 8 metres (26 ft)
- Platform levels: 1
- Parking: No
- Cycle facilities: No

Other information
- Station code: 018

History
- Opened: 30 December 1963; 62 years ago

Services
Preceding station	Moscow Metro	Following station
Yugo-Zapadnaya towards Potapovo	Sokolnicheskaya line	Universitet towards Bulvar Rokossovskogo
Novatorskaya anticlockwise / outer	Bolshaya Koltsevaya line transfer at Prospekt Vernadskogo	Michurinsky Prospekt clockwise / inner
Route map
Location
- Location within Moscow Metro

Prospekt Vernadskogo (Russian: Проспе́кт Верна́дского, English: Vernadsky Avenue) is a Moscow Metro station in the Prospekt Vernadskogo District, Western Administrative Okrug, Moscow. It is on the Sokolnicheskaya line, between Yugo-Zapadnaya and Universitet stations. Built in 1963, it conforms to the standard pillar-trispan design which was used for virtually all Metro stations in the 1960s. The station has pillars faced in yellowish Ural marble and walls tiled with stripes of yellow and blue. The vestibule on the north-east end of the platform contains a bust of the station's namesake, Vladimir Vernadsky. The architects were Ivan Taranov and Nadezhda Bykova.

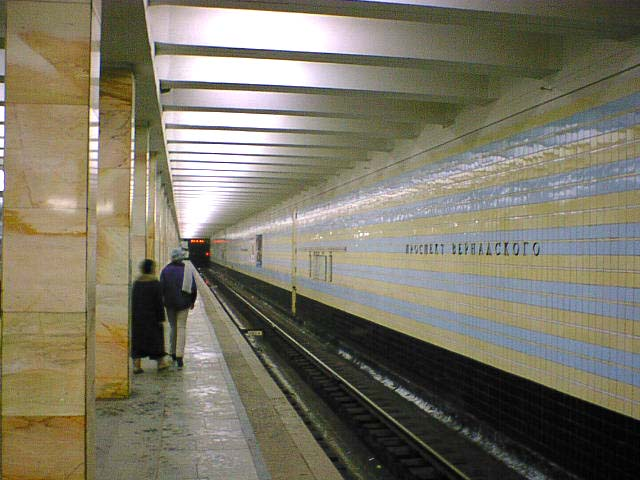
Platform of Prospekt Vernadslkogo

Passengers can transfer to Prospekt Vernadskogo on the Bolshaya Koltsevaya line.
