= Yugo-Zapadnaya (Moscow Metro) =

Moscow Metro station

Yugo-Zapadnaya Юго-Западная
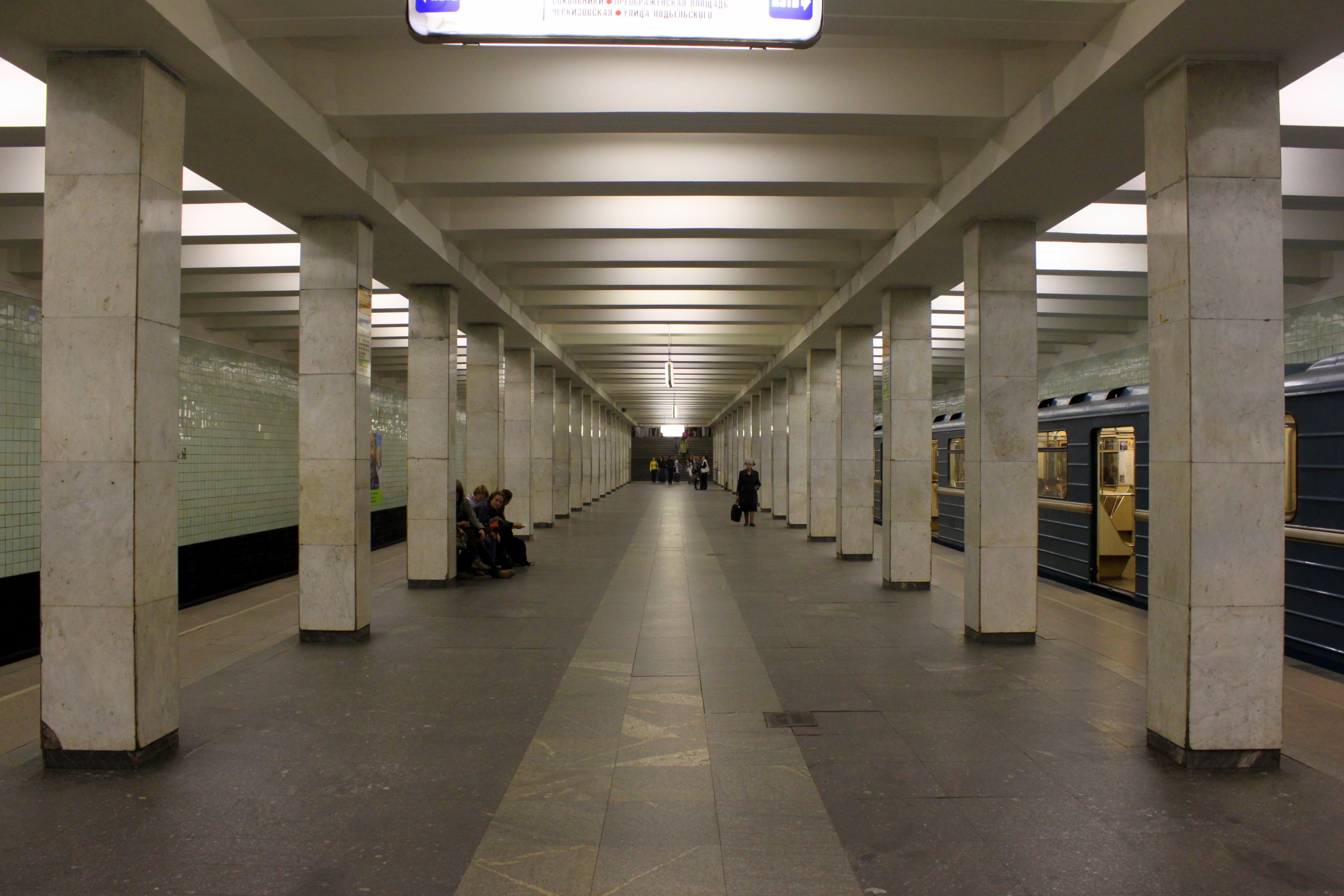

General information
- Location: Troparyovo-Nikulino District; Western Administrative Okrug; Moscow; Russia
- Coordinates: 55.6637°N 37.4833°E
- System: Moscow Metro station
- Owner: Moskovsky Metropoliten
- Line: Sokolnicheskaya line
- Platforms: 1
- Tracks: 2
- Connections: Bus: 66, 144, 196, 226, 227, 272, 261, 272, 281, 611, 611с, 630, 642, 688, 699, 707, 707к, 718, 720, 735, 752, 785, 802, 816, 844; Trolleybus: 34,62,84

Construction
- Structure type: Shallow column triple-span station
- Depth: 8 metres (26 ft)
- Platform levels: 1
- Parking: No

Other information
- Station code: 019

History
- Opened: 30 December 1963; 62 years ago

Services
Preceding station	Moscow Metro	Following station
Troparyovo towards Potapovo	Sokolnicheskaya line	Prospekt Vernadskogo towards Bulvar Rokossovskogo
Route map
Location
- Location within Moscow Metro

Yugo-Zapadnaya (Russian: Ю́го-За́падная, English: Southwestern), is a station on the Sokolnicheskaya line of the Moscow Metro. The station opened in 1963. The name, Yugo-Zapadnaya, means southwest in Russian and indicates its location in the southwestern part of the city and in the former Yugo-Zapad residential district. It was the southern terminus of the Sokolnicheskaya line until December 8, 2014, when Troparyovo station opened.

== Design ==
Like dozens of other Metro stations dating to the 1960s, the station was built according to the standard column tri-span or "centipede" design. The architect was Ya. V. Tatarzhinskaya. Visually nondescript, the station's colour scheme is mainly white. Yugo-Zapadnaya has four entrances, all grouped around the intersection of Vernadskogo Avenue and Pokryshkina Street.

== Gallery ==
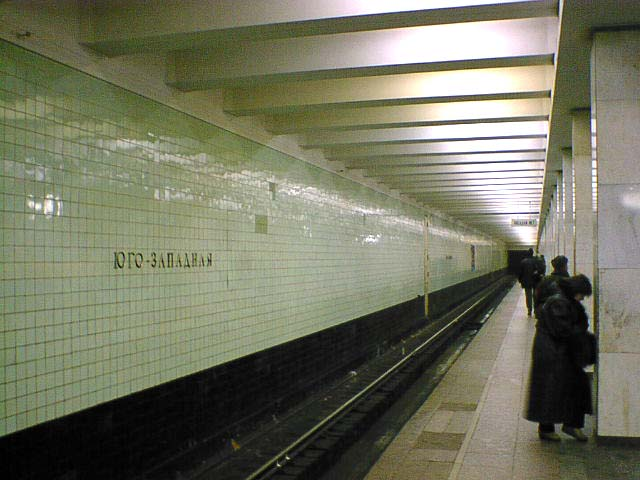
Platform of Yugo-Zapadnaya
