= University station =

University station may refer to any of the following:

- University Metro station, a station on the Tyne and Wear Metro, serving the University of Sunderland, United Kingdom
- University railway station (England), serving the University of Birmingham, in Birmingham, England, United Kingdom
- University railway station (Northern Ireland), serving the University of Ulster at Coleraine, in Coleraine, Northern Ireland, United Kingdom
- University Station, the branding of the condominium complex in the Produce Terminal Cold Storage Company Building, in Chicago, Illinois, United States
- University station (Buffalo Metro Rail), a light metro station serving the University at Buffalo, in Buffalo, New York, United States
- University station (Calgary), a light rail station serving the University of Calgary in Alberta, Canada
- University station (CTA), a former L station serving the University of Chicago, in Chicago, Illinois, United States
- University station (Edmonton), a light rail station serving the University of Alberta in Alberta, Canada
- University station (Los Angeles Metro), a light rail station serving the University of Southern California, in Los Angeles, California, United States, now renamed Expo Park/USC station
- University station (Miami-Dade County), a rapid transit station serving the University of Miami, in Coral Gables, Florida, United States
- University station (MTR), a railway station serving the Chinese University of Hong Kong, in Sha Tin District, New Territories

== Other languages ==
- Universitat station (Barcelona), a subway station in Barcelona, Spain
- Universität station (Munich U-Bahn), a subway station in Munich, Germany
- Universität/Markt station, a rapid transit station in Bonn, Germany
- Universitet (Moscow Metro), serving Moscow State University, in Moscow, Russia
- Universitetet metro station, serving Stockholm University, in Stockholm, Sweden
- Universitetet railway station, serving Stockholm University, in Stockholm, Sweden
- Universiti LRT station, a light rail station serving the University of Malaya (Universiti Malaya), in Kuala Lumpur, Malaysia
- Universytet (Kharkiv Metro), serving Kharkiv National University, in Kharkiv, Ukraine
- Universytet (Kyiv Metro), serving Taras Shevchenko National University, in Kyiv, Ukraine

== See also ==
- College Station (disambiguation)
- Universidad station (disambiguation)
- List of university stations
- University (disambiguation)
