= Liangxiang Univ. Town station =

Beijing Subway station

Liangxiang Univ. Town 良乡大学城
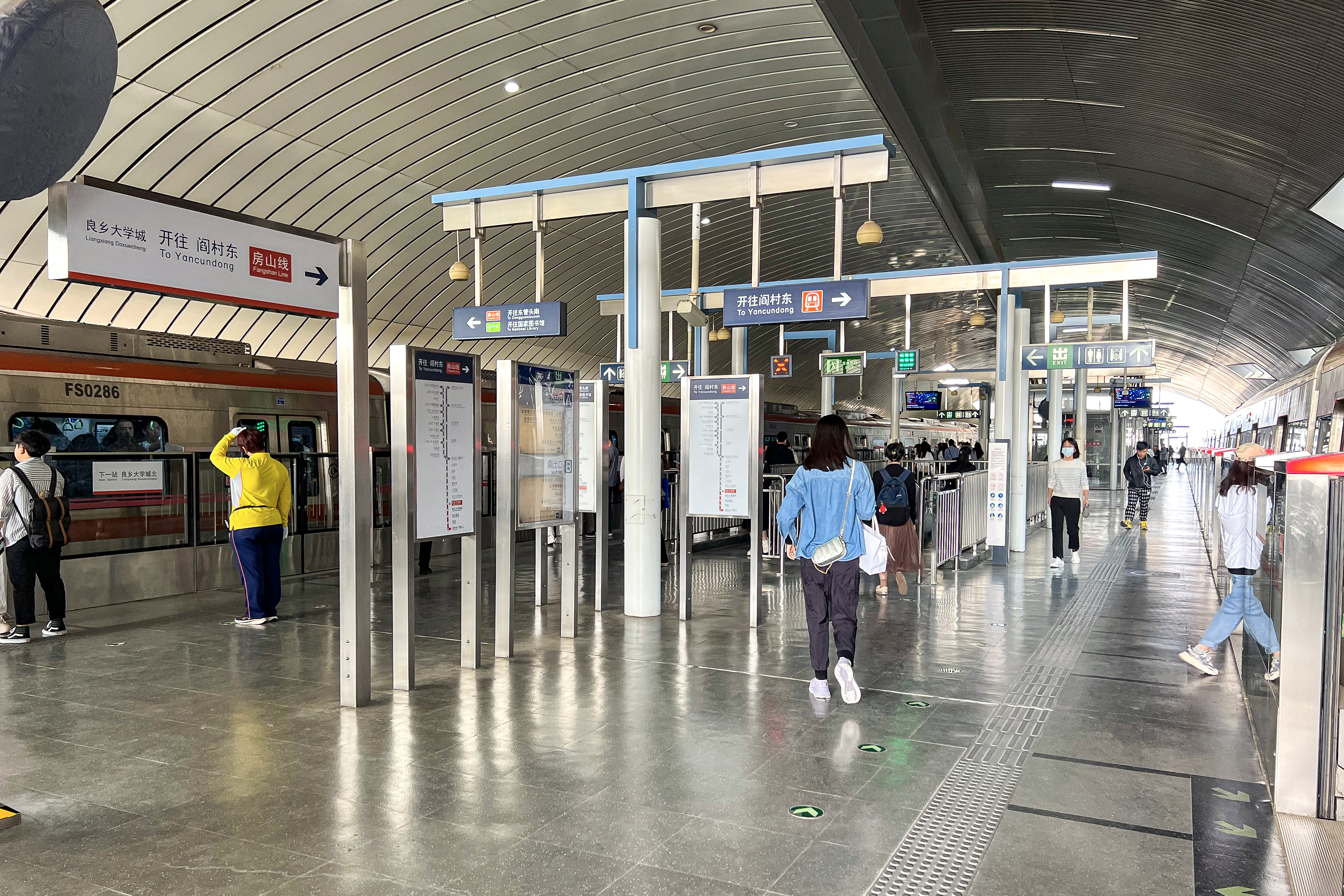
- Platform

General information
- Location: Changhong East Road (长虹东路); Liangxiang, Fangshan District, Beijing; China
- Coordinates: 39°43′23″N 116°10′36″E
- Operator: Beijing Mass Transit Railway Operation Corporation Limited
- Line: Fangshan line
- Platforms: 2 (1 island platform)
- Tracks: 2

Construction
- Structure type: Elevated
- Accessible: Yes

History
- Opened: December 30, 2010

Services
Preceding station	Beijing Subway	Following station
Liangxiang Univ. Town North towards Dongguantounan	Fangshan line	Liangxiang Univ. Town West towards Yancundong
Location
- Location within Beijing

Liangxiang Univ. Town station (simplified Chinese: 良乡大学城站; traditional Chinese: 良鄉大學城站; pinyin: Liángxiāng Dàxuéchéng zhàn) is a station on Fangshan Line of the Beijing Subway.

== Station layout ==
The station has an elevated island platform.

== Exits ==
The station has 4 exits, lettered A1, A2, B1, and B2. Exits A1 and B1 are accessible.
