= Liangxiang Univ. Town North station =

Beijing Subway station

Liangxiang Univ. Town North 良乡大学城北
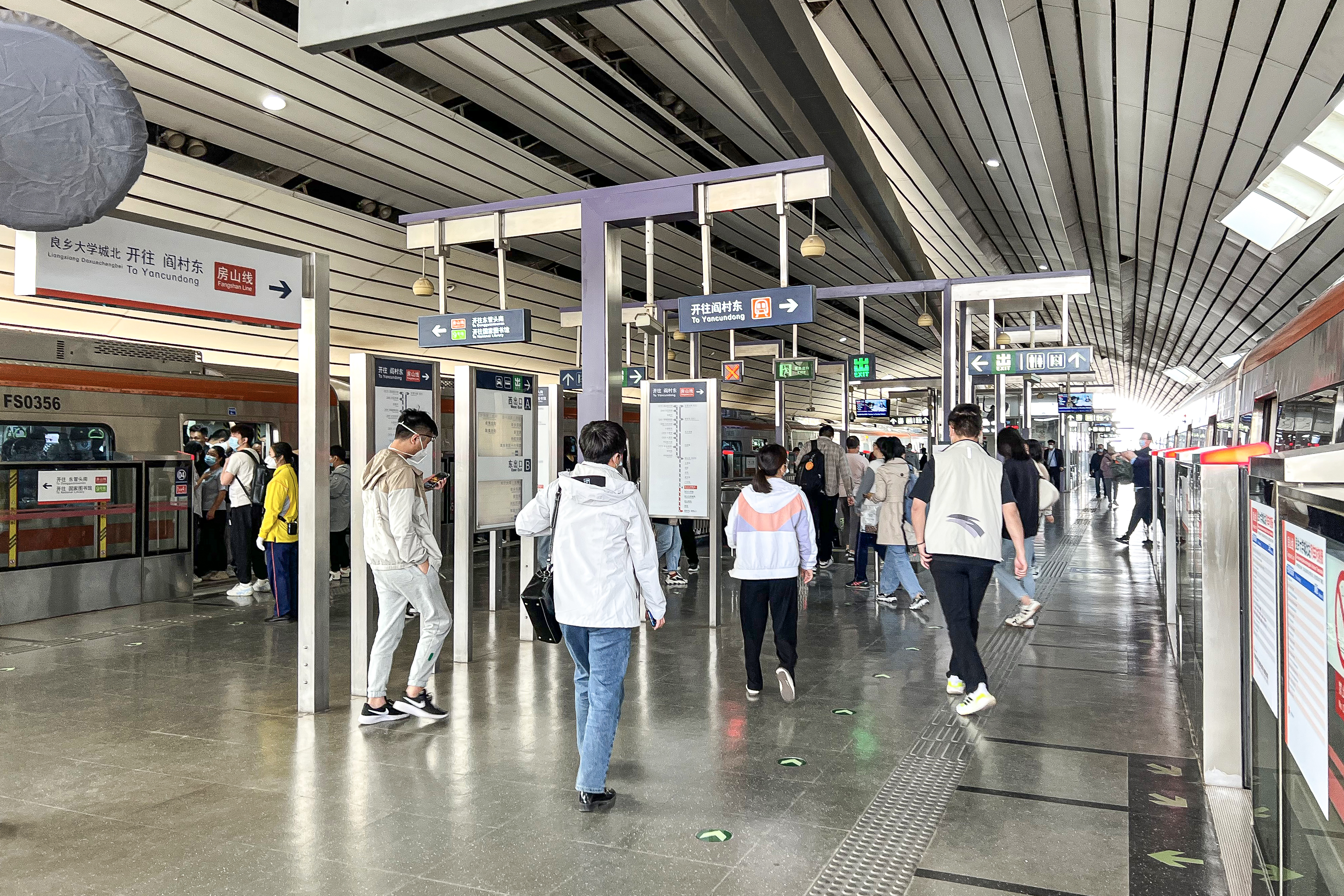
- Platform

General information
- Location: Changyu Avenue (长于大街) and Liangxiang East Road (良乡东路); Gongchen Subdistrict, Fangshan District, Beijing; China
- Coordinates: 39°43′48″N 116°11′01″E
- Operator: Beijing Mass Transit Railway Operation Corporation Limited
- Line: Fangshan line
- Platforms: 2 (1 island platform)
- Tracks: 2

Construction
- Structure type: Elevated
- Accessible: Yes

History
- Opened: December 30, 2010; 15 years ago

Services
Preceding station	Beijing Subway	Following station
Guangyang Cheng towards Dongguantounan	Fangshan line	Liangxiang Univ. Town towards Yancundong
Location
- Location within Beijing

Liangxiang Univ. Town North station (simplified Chinese: 良乡大学城北站; traditional Chinese: 良鄉大學城北站; pinyin: Liángxiāng Dàxuéchéng Běi zhàn) is a station on Fangshan Line of the Beijing Subway.

== Station layout ==
The station has an elevated island platform.

== Exits ==
There are 4 exits, lettered A1, A2, B1, and B2. Exits A1 and B1 are accessible.
