= Aalborg University Hospital =

- North Denmark Region
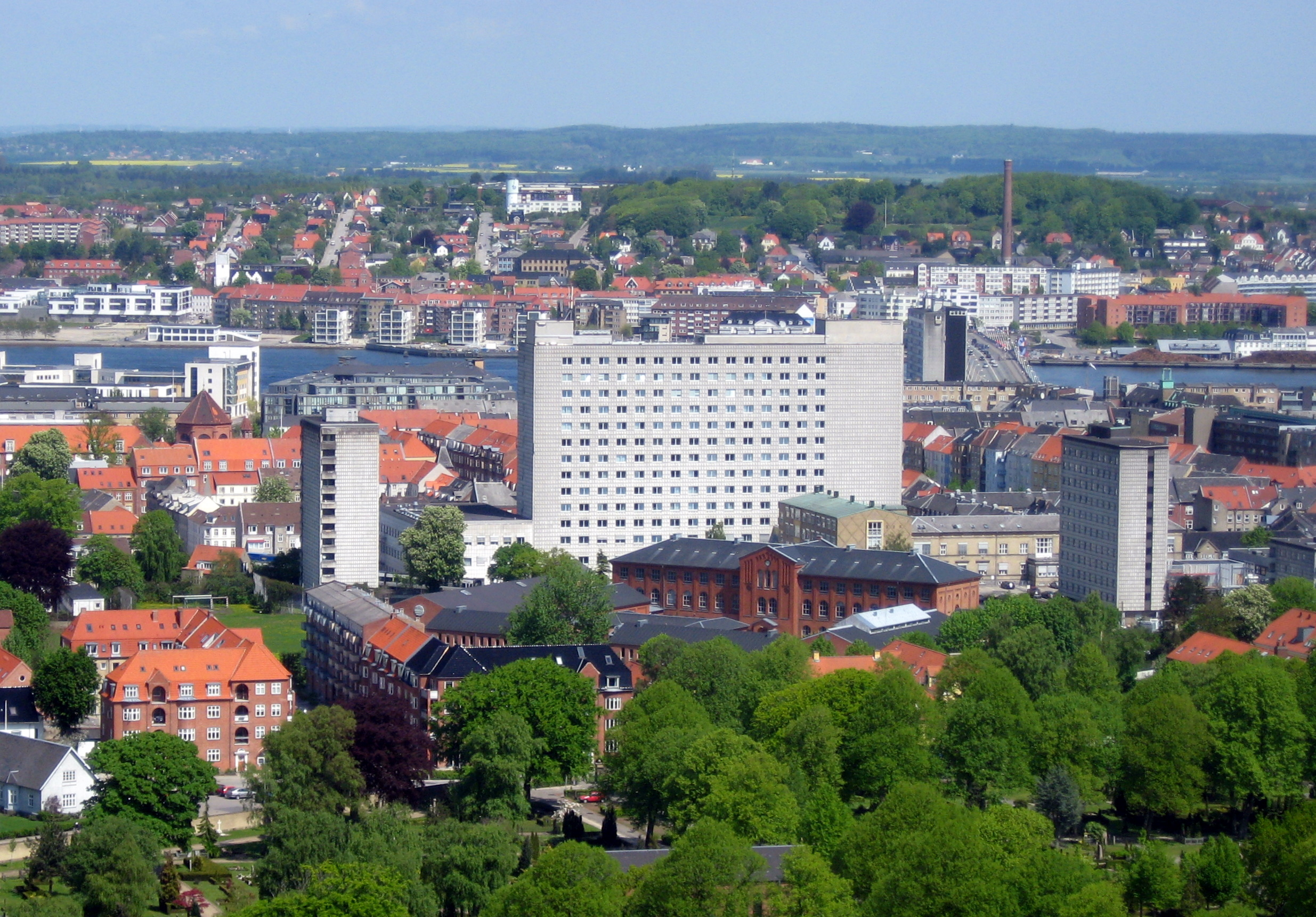
- Aalborg Hospital, Section North

Geography
- Location: Aalborg, North Denmark Region, Denmark
- Coordinates: 57°2′16.37″N 9°54′30.63″E

Organisation
- Type: Teaching
- Affiliated university: Aalborg University

Services
- Emergency department: Yes

Helipads
- Helipad: No

Links
- Website: www.aalborguh.rn.dk

Aalborg University Hospital is the largest hospital in the North Denmark Region, Denmark.

It is also northern Jutland's largest employer, with approximately 6,500 employees. The hospital consists of Section South and North in Aalborg and Dronninglund Hospital. Surgical Department A in Hobro, the Eye, Nose and Throat Department and the Ophthalmology Department in Hjørring, the clinic-chemical functions in Hobro and Farsø and the dialysis section in Hjørring are also part of Aalborg Hospital.

Aalborg Hospital handles highly specialised regional functions for approximately 640,000 inhabitants, including parts of the Central Denmark Region, regional functions for approximately 490,000 inhabitants and basic hospital functions, except for certain elective procedures, for approximately 250,000 inhabitants.

== Organisation ==
Aalborg Hospital is organised into five centres; the 'Medical Centre', the 'Anaesthesia, Paediatrics and Surgery Centre', the 'Head, Ortho and Heart Centre', the 'Cancer and Diagnostics Centre' and a 'Service Centre'.

There are three management levels: the hospital management, the centre managers and the departmental management. Some of the departments are function-based and also have sub-departments at other hospitals in the region. In these cases, the departmental management at Aalborg Hospital is also the management for the function-based unit.

The centre manager is responsible for the overall development and activities at the centre, and for ensuring that the centre's operations and the framework for its operations are optimised. That is why it is a vital that the centre is run by a professional manager with in-depth knowledge of the healthcare sector.

The centre manager reports to the hospital director, while the daily management tasks are handled in cooperation with the overall hospital management and the other centre managers in the organisation management. Each centre has a number of departments and departmental managements.

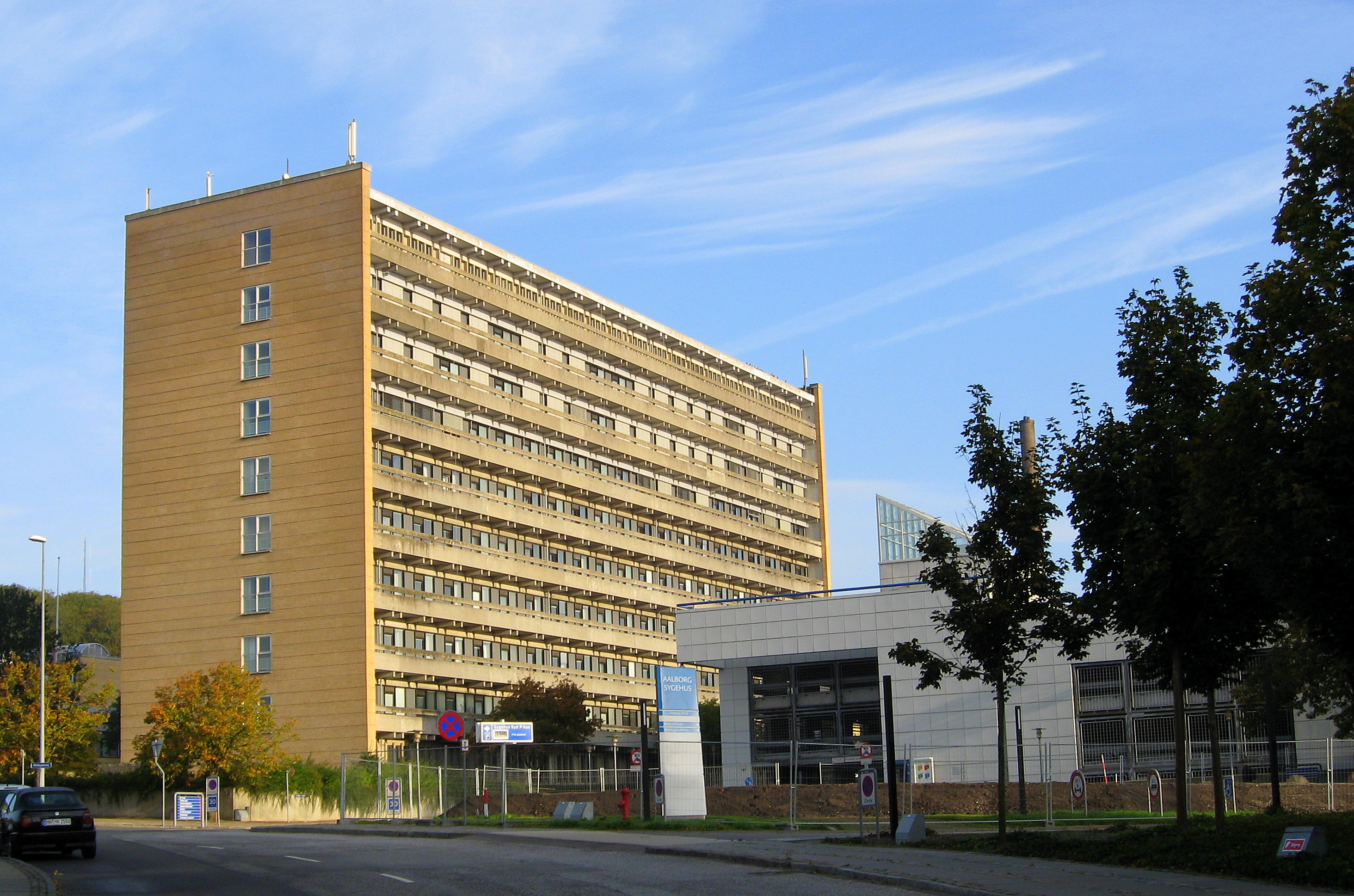
Aalborg Hospital, Section South – the psychiatry

== Specialist fields at Aalborg Hospital ==
Aalborg Hospital caters for all medical specialisations with the exception of Dermatovenereology, clinical pharmacology and psychiatry.

The following is a list of all the specialist fields at Aalborg Hospital:

- Anaesthesiology
- Occupational medicine
- Diagnostic radiology
- Gynaecology and obstetrics
- Internal medicine: (geriatrics, haematology, infectious diseases, cardiology, endocrinology, gastroenterology, pulmonary diseases, nephrology, rheumatology)
- Neurology
- Vascular surgery
- Surgery
- Clinical chemistry
- Clinical physiology and nuclear medicine
- Clinical genetics
- Clinical immunology
- Medical microbiology
- Oral surgery
- Neurosurgery
- Ophthalmology
- Oncology
- Otorhinolaryngology
- Pathology
- Plastic surgery
- Paediatrics
- Social medicine
- Thoracic surgery
- Urology

== University Hospital section ==
Until 2013, Aalborg Hospital was part of Århus University Hospital but it now technically a university hospital with connections to Aalborg University. Aalborg Hospital handles pre- and postgraduate education and research at an international level. Employees at Aalborg Hospital publish almost 500 scientific articles annually and participate in projects and networks financed by national and international funds, including the EU's 7th Framework Programme.

The Department for University Hospital Affairs provides a number of services and support functions for research and education. These include research management, financing, fundraising, communication/knowledge sharing, patenting, cooperation agreements, library functions, pre- and postgraduate education, skills training and innovation. The department is located at the Research House (Aalborg Hospital Science and Innovation Center), where a number of research centres are also located along with facilities for education and innovation.

The research at Aalborg Hospital is especially renowned in the area of clinical epidemiology, medical gastroenterology, pain research, visceral biomechanics, lipid research and cardiology, nursing research, thyroid gland and haematology.
