= Shenzhen Technology University =

Municipal public university located in Shenzhen, Guangdong, China

- 深圳技术大学
- Type: Public university
- Established: 2018; 8 years ago
- President: Ruan Shuangchen
- Students: 3,557 (2021)
- Undergraduates: 3,379 (2021)
- Postgraduates: 178 (2021)
- Location: Shenzhen, Guangdong, China
- Campus: Urban area
- Colours
- Website: sztu.edu.cn

Chinese name
- Simplified Chinese: 深圳技术大学
- Traditional Chinese: 深圳技術大學
Transcriptions
Standard Mandarin
- Hanyu Pinyin: Shēnzhèn Jìshù Dàxué
Yue: Cantonese
- Jyutping: sam1 zan3 gei6 seot6 daai6 hok6

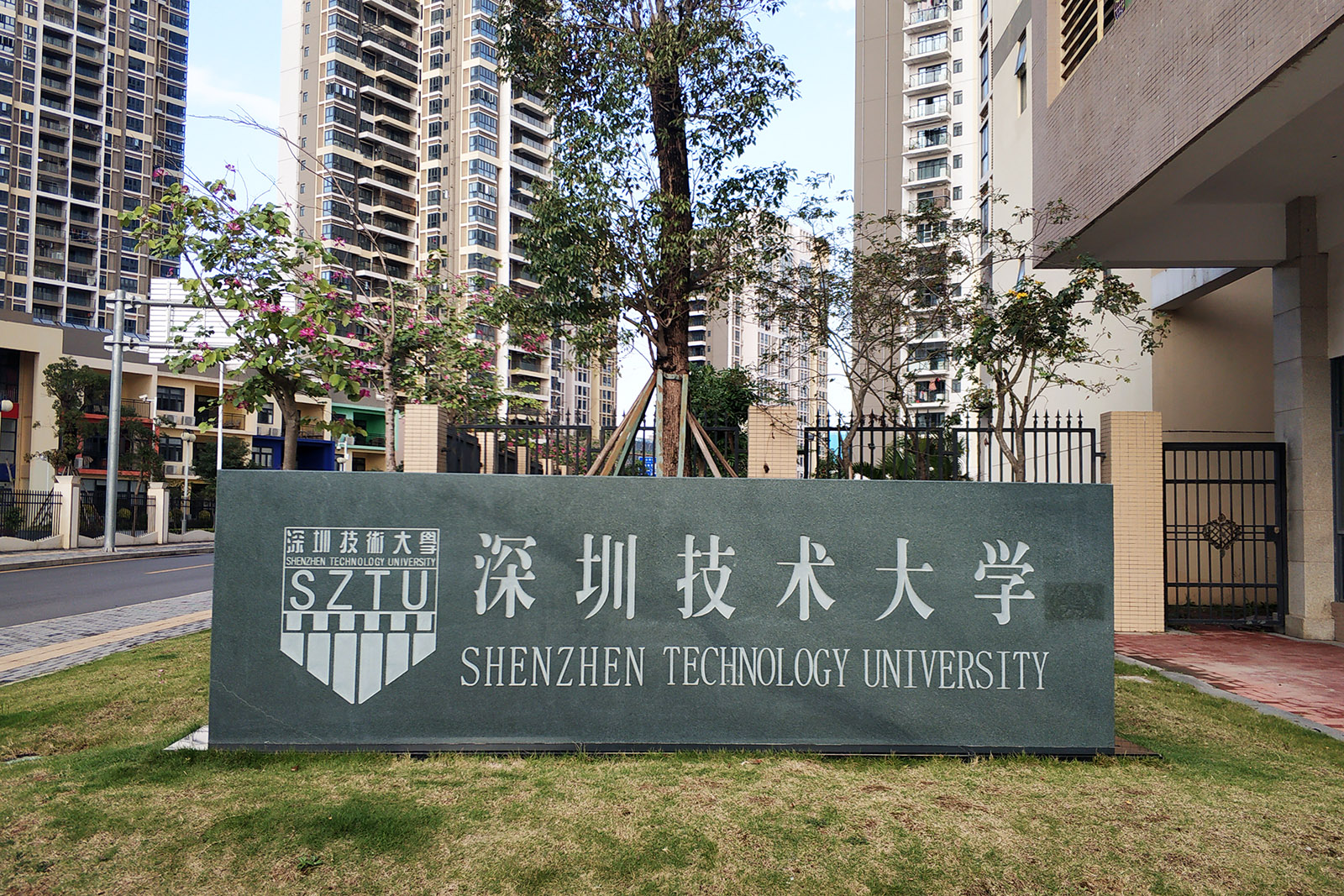

The Shenzhen Technology University (SZTU; 深圳技术大学) is a municipal public university located in Pingshan, Shenzhen, Guangdong, China. The university is funded by the Shenzhen Municipal Education Bureau.

Its first phase is scheduled to be 970,000 square metres (10,400,000 sq ft) in area.
