= Universitet (Moscow Metro) =

Moscow Metro station

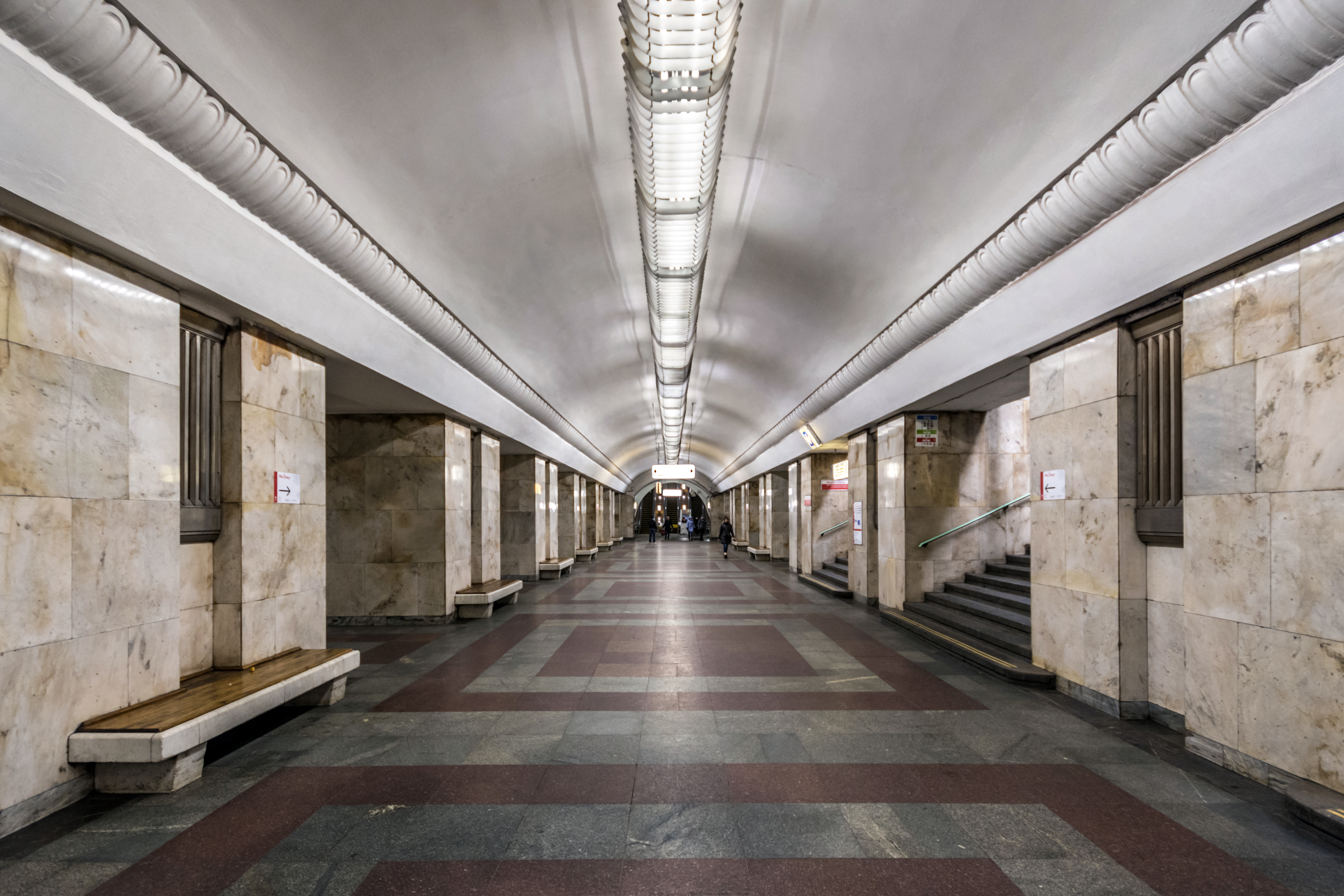

General information
- Location: Ramenki District; Gagarinsky District; Western Administrative Okrug; South-Western Administrative Okrug; Moscow; Russia
- Coordinates: 55.6926°N 37.5333°E
- System: Moscow Metro station
- Owner: Moskovsky Metropoliten
- Line: Sokolnicheskaya line
- Platforms: 1
- Tracks: 2
- Connections: Bus: 1, 47, 67, 67к, 103, 111, 113, 119, 130, 187, 260, 661, 845; Trolleybus: 4, 34, 34к, 49; Tram: 14, 26, 39

Construction
- Structure type: deep pylon triple-vault station
- Depth: 26.5 metres (87 ft)
- Platform levels: 1
- Parking: No
- Cycle facilities: No

Other information
- Station code: 017

History
- Opened: 12 January 1959; 67 years ago

Services
Preceding station	Moscow Metro	Following station
Prospekt Vernadskogo towards Potapovo	Sokolnicheskaya line	Vorobyovy Gory towards Bulvar Rokossovskogo
Route map
Location
- Location within Moscow Metro

Universitet (Russian: Университе́т, English: University), named after the nearby Moscow State University, is a station on the Moscow Metro's Sokolnicheskaya Line. It opened in 1959 and has rectangular white marble pylons and tiled walls. The architects were V. Litvinov, M. Markovsky, L. Lile and V. Dobrakovsky. The station's two round entrance vestibules (architect Ivan Taranov) are located on either side of Prospekt Vernadskogo at Lomonosovsky Prospekt.

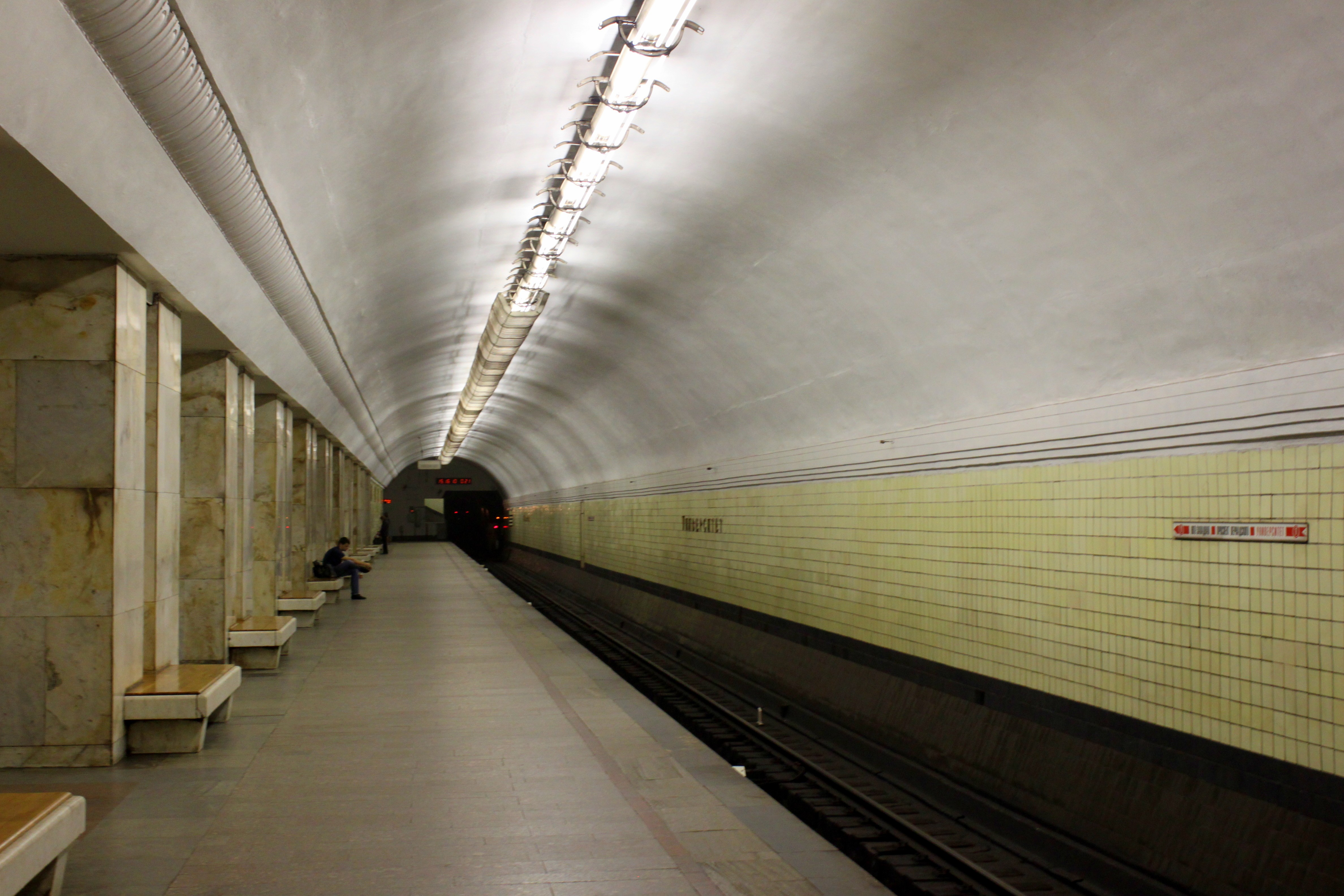
Platform view of the station
