= Pingshan station =

Pingshan station or Pingshan railway station may refer to:

- Pingshan station (Fuzhou Metro), a metro station on Line 1 of Fuzhou Metro in Fuzhou, Fujian Province, China.
- Pingshan station (Shenzhen Metro), a metro station on Line 16 of Shenzhen Metro in Shenzhen, Guangdong Province, China.
- Ping Shan stop, a light rail stop in Hong Kong
- Pingshan railway station (Sichuan), a high-speed rail station in Pingshan County, Yibin, Sichuan Province, China.
- Shenzhen Pingshan railway station, a high-speed rail station in Shenzhen, Guangdong Province, China.
