= IFQ =

IFQ may refer to:

- Individual fishing quota, a means by which many governments regulate fishing
- Shenzhen Pingshan railway station (Telegraph code: IFQ), a railway station in Guangdong, China
