= Xinhe station =

Xinhe station may refer to the following stations:

- Xinhe station (Guangzhou Metro)
- Xinhe station (Shenzhen Metro)
