= Xintangwei station =

Shenzhen Metro Line 16 station

Xintangwei 新塘围
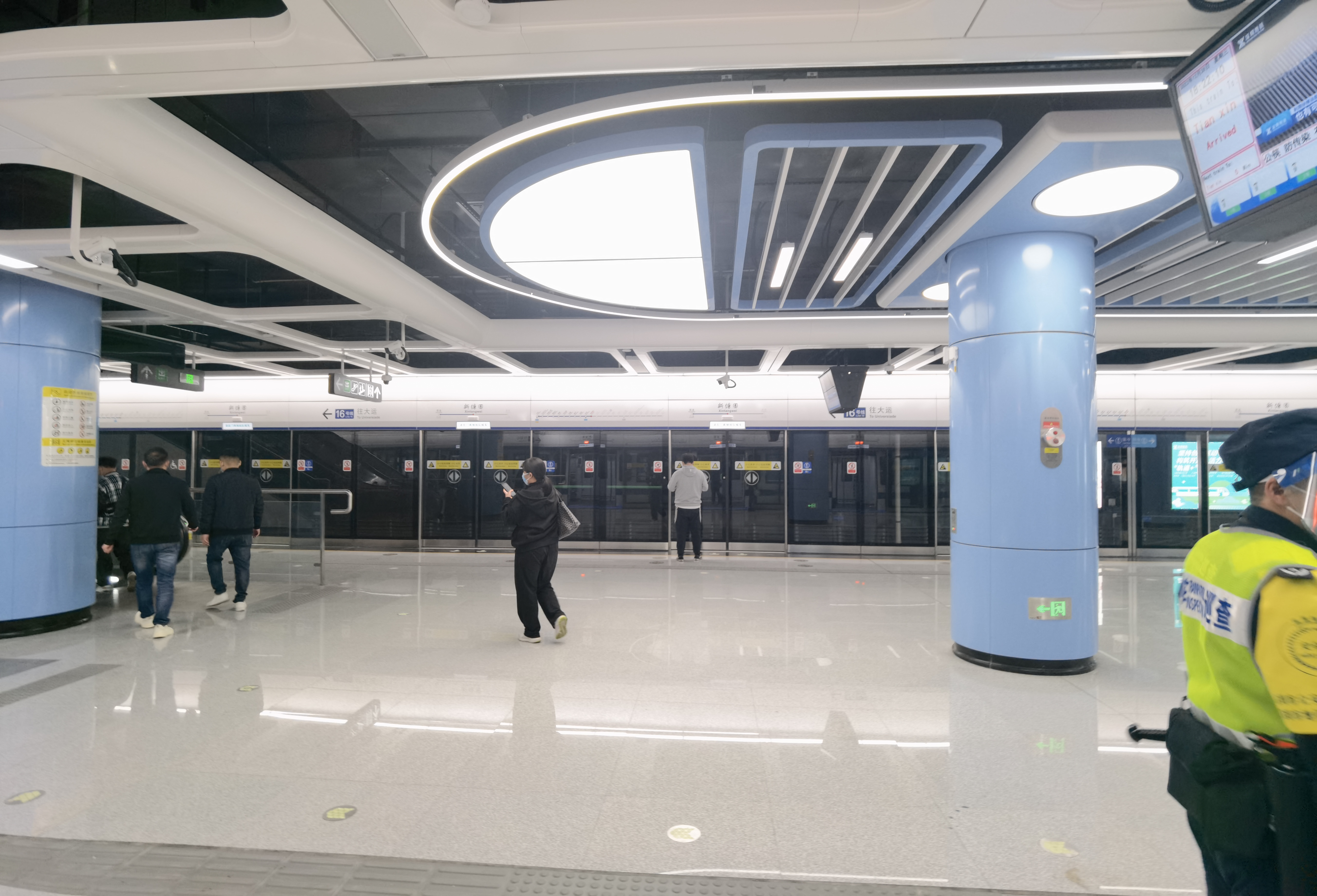
- Platform

Chinese name
- Traditional Chinese: 新塘圍
- Simplified Chinese: 新塘围
Transcriptions
Standard Mandarin
- Hanyu Pinyin: Xīntángwéi
Yue: Cantonese
- Yale Romanization: Sāntòngwài
- Jyutping: San1 Tong4 Wai4

General information
- Location: Intersection of Shenxian Road and Xingdong Avenue; Baolong Subdistrict, Longgang District, Shenzhen, Guangdong; China
- Coordinates: 22°43′40.66″N 114°16′54.73″E
- Operated by: SZMC (Shenzhen Metro Group)
- Line: Line 16
- Platforms: 2 (1 island platform)
- Tracks: 2

Construction
- Structure type: Underground
- Accessible: Yes

History
- Opened: 28 December 2022; 3 years ago

Services
Preceding station	Shenzhen Metro	Following station
Shuanglong towards Yuanshan Xikeng	Line 16	Longdong towards Tianxin
Location

Xintangwei station (simplified Chinese: 新塘围; traditional Chinese: 新塘圍; pinyin: Xīntángwéi; Cantonese Yale: Sāntòngwài) is a station on Line 16 of Shenzhen Metro. It opened on 28 December 2022. It is located in Longgang District at the junction of Shenxian Road and Xingdong Avenue.

== Station layout ==
The station has an island platform under Shenxian Road.

G	-	Exits A-D
B1F; Concourse	Lobby	Ticket Machines, Customer Service, Automatic Vending Machines
B2F; Platforms	Platform	16 towards Yuanshan Xikeng (Shuanglong)
B2F; Platforms	Island platform, doors will open on the left
B2F; Platforms	Platform	16 towards Tianxin (Longdong)

== Exits ==
Exit	Destination
Exit A	Shenxian Road (S), Vienna Hotel, Delin Building, Caide School
Exit B	Shenxian Road (S), Daguang Farmers' Comprehensive Wholesale Market, Jingjing 2nd Community
Exit C	Shenxian Road (N), Sinopec gas station
Exit D	Shenxian Road (N), Longyuan New Estate, Transportation Administrative Law Enforcement Team, Xingdong Avenue
