= Baolong Tongle station =

Shenzhen Metro Line 16 station

Baolong Tongle 宝龙同乐
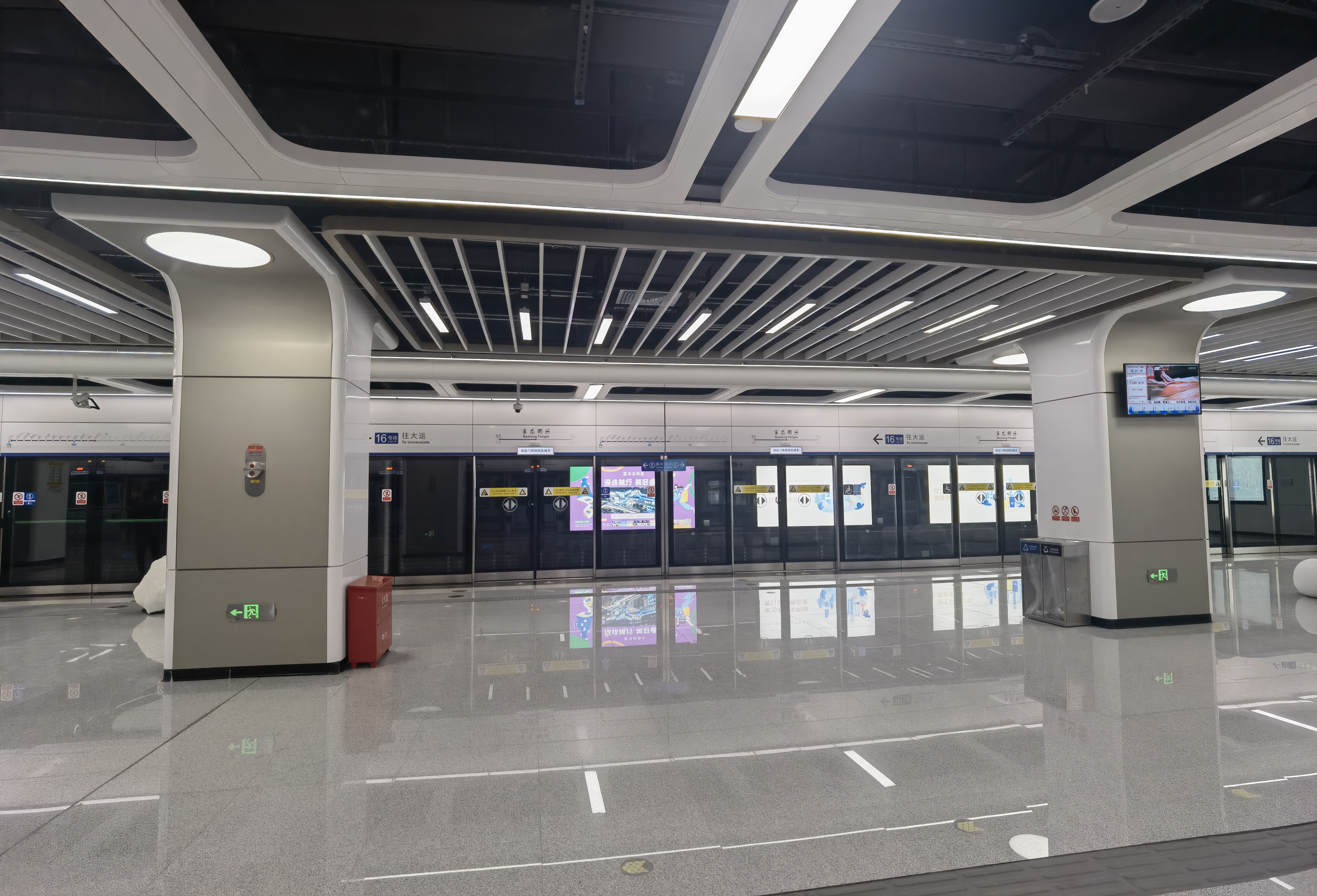
- Platform

Chinese name
- Traditional Chinese: 寶龍同樂
- Simplified Chinese: 宝龙同乐
Transcriptions
Standard Mandarin
- Hanyu Pinyin: Bǎolóng Tónglè
Yue: Cantonese
- Yale Romanization: Bóulùhng Tùhnglohk
- Jyutping: Bou2 Lung4 Tung6 Lok6

General information
- Location: Intersection of Shenxian Road and Tongli Road; Baolong Subdistrict, Longgang District, Shenzhen, Guangdong; China
- Coordinates: 22°42′42.66″N 114°18′26.46″E
- Operated by: SZMC (Shenzhen Metro Group)
- Line: Line 16
- Platforms: 2 (1 island platform)
- Tracks: 2

Construction
- Structure type: Underground
- Accessible: Yes

History
- Opened: 28 December 2022; 3 years ago

Services
Preceding station	Shenzhen Metro	Following station
Longdong towards Yuanshan Xikeng	Line 16	Pingshan towards Tianxin
Location

Baolong Tongle station (simplified Chinese: 宝龙同乐; traditional Chinese: 寶龍同樂; pinyin: Bǎolóng Tónglè; Cantonese Yale: Bóulùhng Tùhnglohk) is a station on Line 16 of Shenzhen Metro. It opened on 28 December 2022.

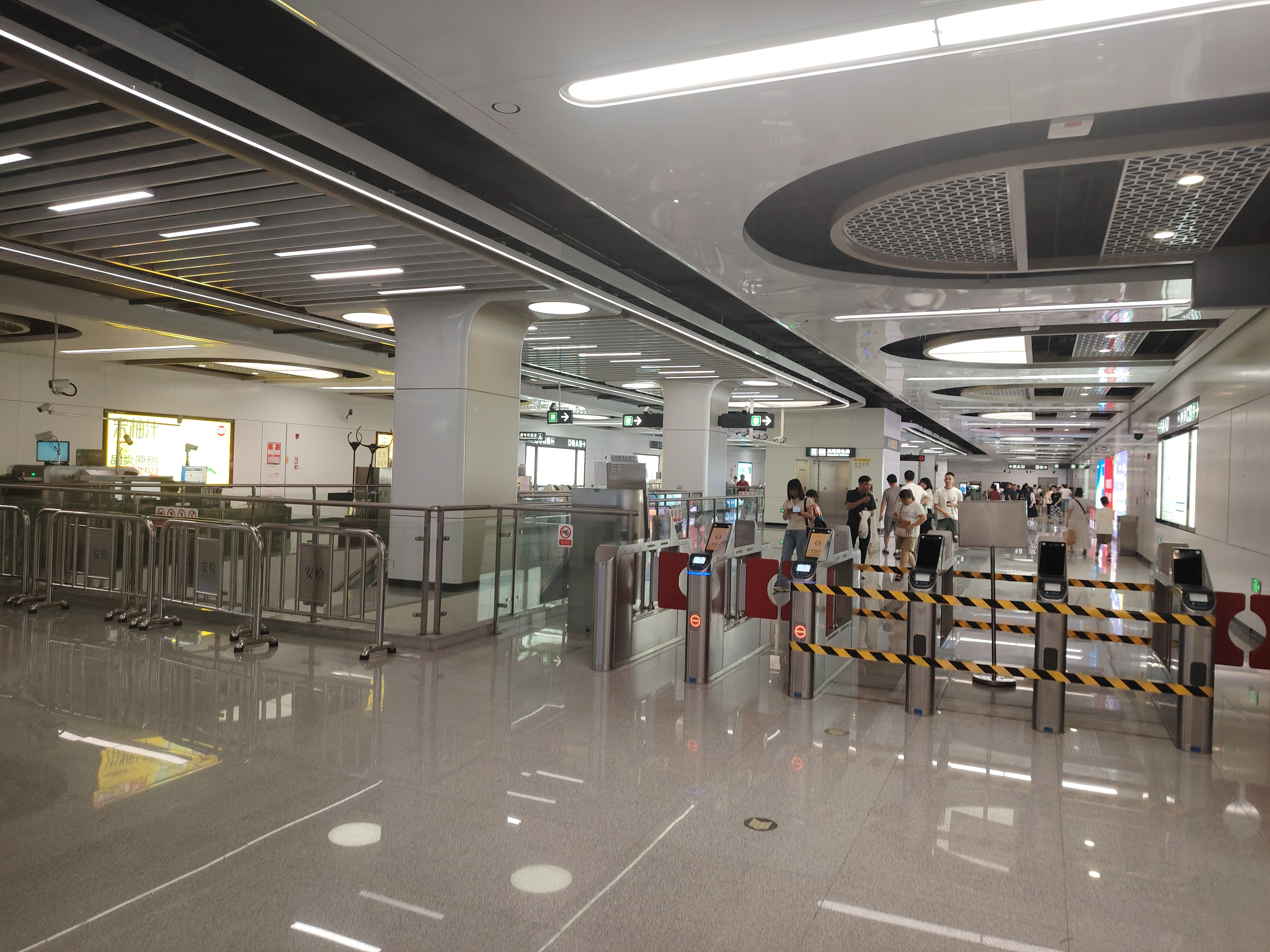
Concourse

== Station layout ==
The station has an island platform under Shenxian Road.

G	-	Exits A-D
B1F; Concourse	Lobby	Ticket Machines, Customer Service, Shops, Automatic Vending Machines
B2F; Platforms	Platform	16 towards Yuanshan Xikeng (Longdong)
B2F; Platforms	Island platform, doors will open on the left
B2F; Platforms	Platform	16 towards Tianxin (Pingshan)

== Exits ==
Exit	Destination
Exit A	Shenxian Road (S), Qiling Estate, Tongle Police Station, Tongleyuan District
Exit B	Shenxian Road (S), Qiling Estate
Exit C	Shenxian Road (N), Fengshun Estate
Exit D	Shenxian Road (N), Changhuwei Community

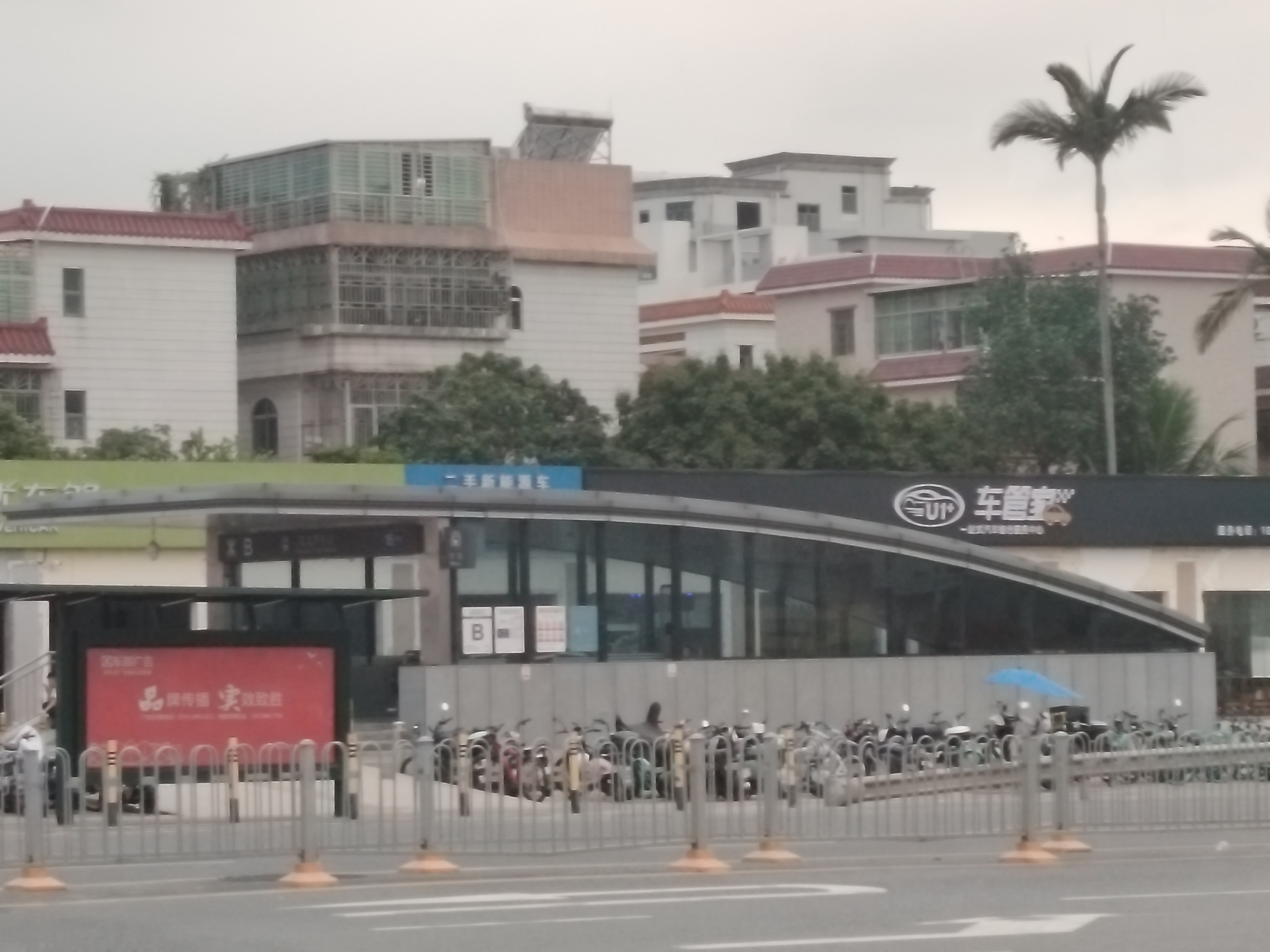
Entrance B

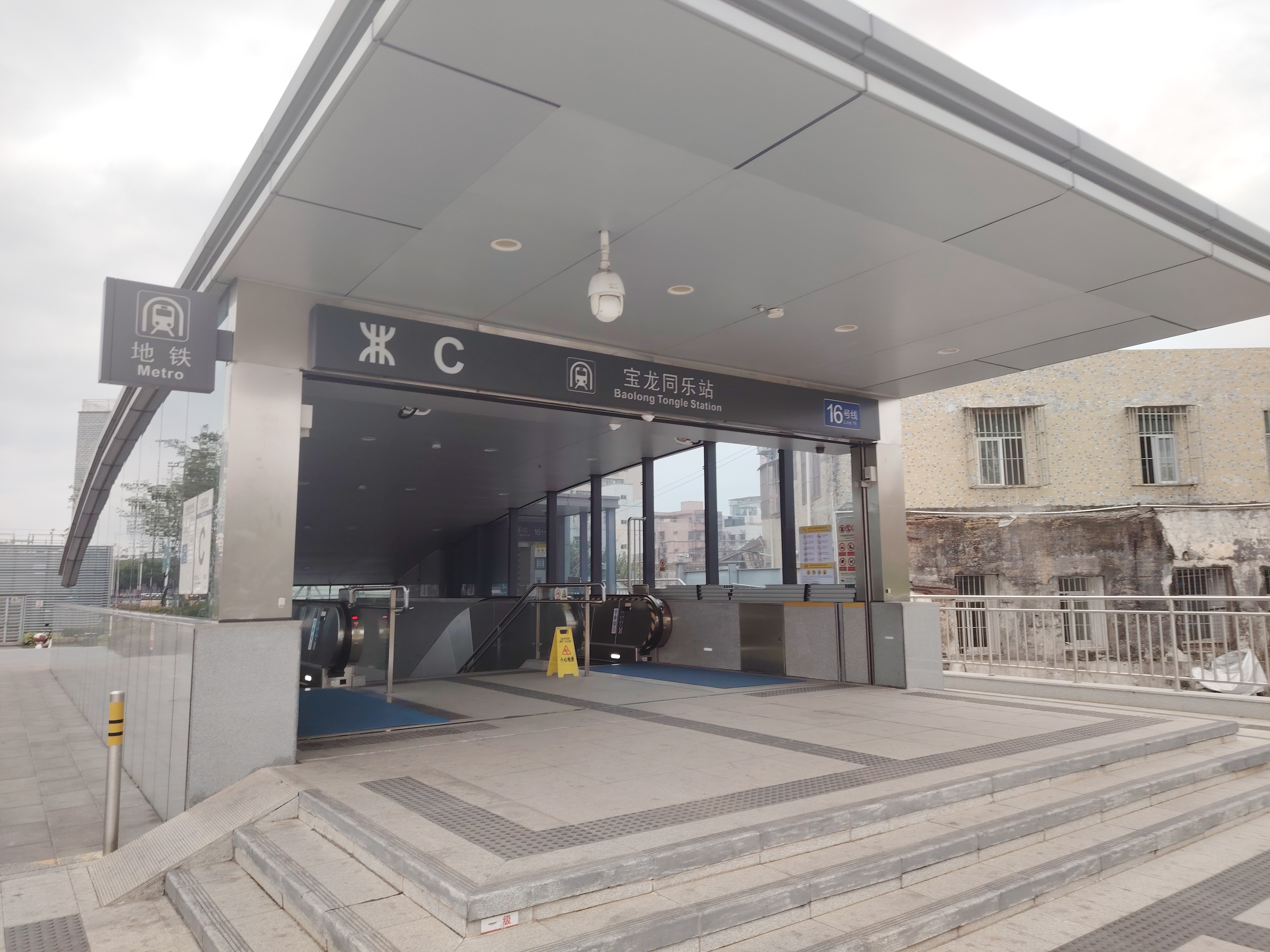
Entrance C

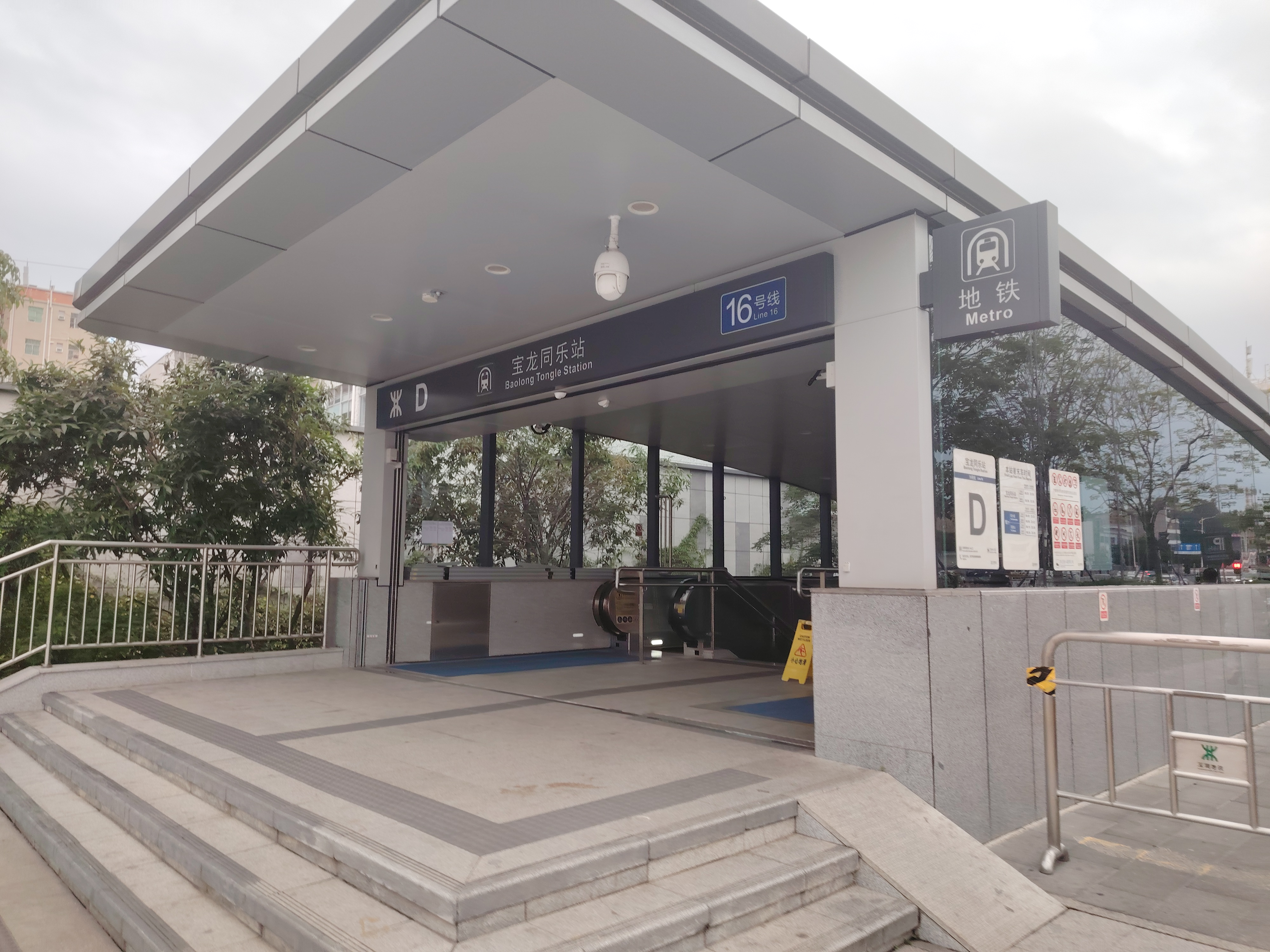
Entrance D
