= Longdong station (Shenzhen Metro) =

Shenzhen Metro Line 16 station

Longdong 龙东
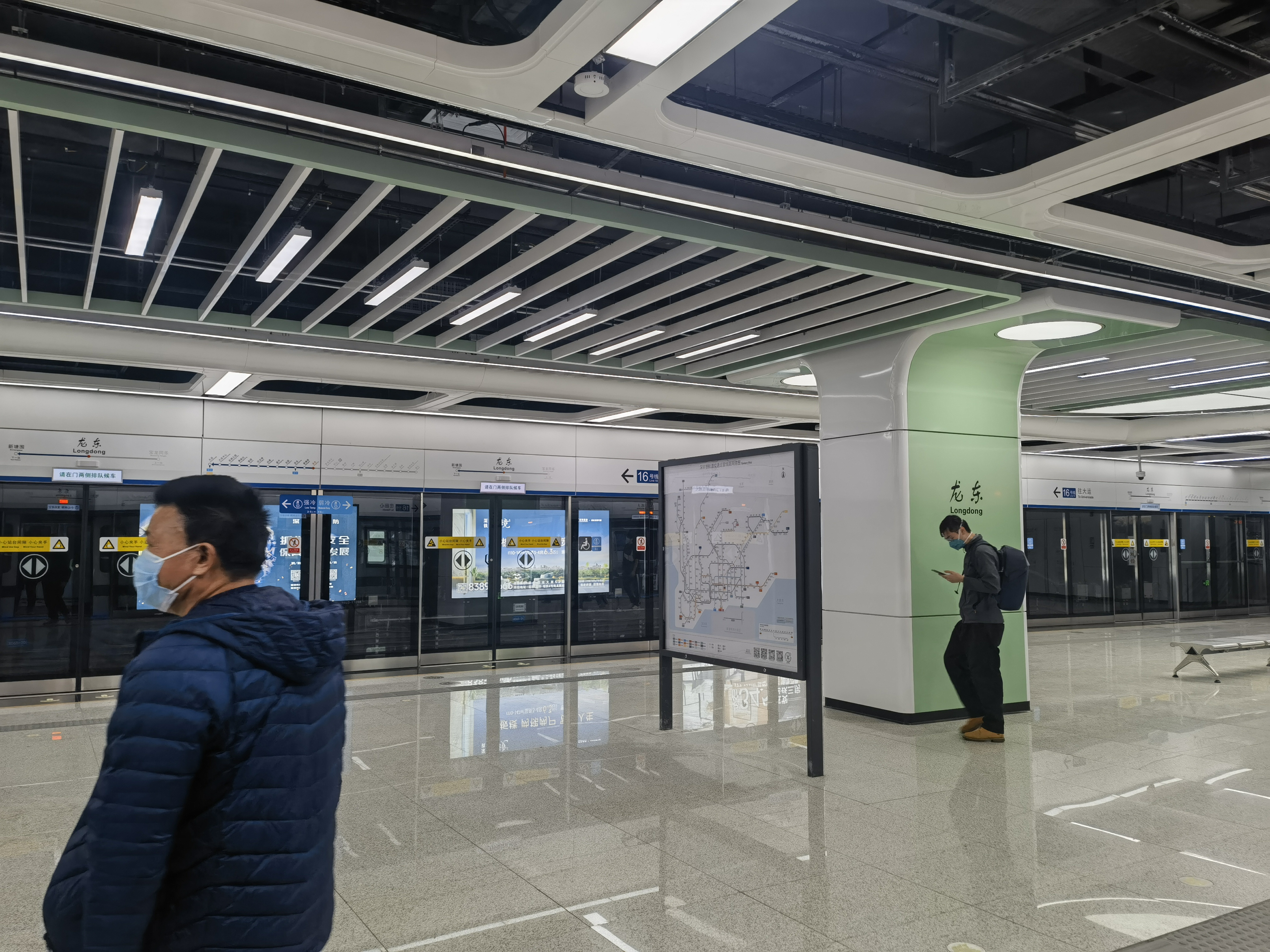
- Platform

Chinese name
- Traditional Chinese: 龍東
- Simplified Chinese: 龙东
Transcriptions
Standard Mandarin
- Hanyu Pinyin: Lóngdōng
Yue: Cantonese
- Yale Romanization: Lùhngdōng
- Jyutping: Lung4 Dung1

General information
- Location: East of the intersection of Shenxian Road and Ainan Road; Baolong Subdistrict, Longgang District, Shenzhen, Guangdong; China
- Coordinates: 22°43′31.19″N 114°17′21.62″E
- Operated by: SZMC (Shenzhen Metro Group)
- Line: Line 16
- Platforms: 2 (1 island platform)
- Tracks: 2

Construction
- Structure type: Underground
- Accessible: Yes

History
- Opened: 28 December 2022; 3 years ago

Services
Preceding station	Shenzhen Metro	Following station
Xintangwei towards Yuanshan Xikeng	Line 16	Baolong Tongle towards Tianxin
Location

Longdong station (simplified Chinese: 龙东; traditional Chinese: 龍東; pinyin: Lóngdōng; Cantonese Yale: Lùhngdōng) is a station on Line 16 of Shenzhen Metro. It opened on 28 December 2022.

== Station layout ==
The station has an island platform under Shenxian Road.

G	-	Exits A-D
B1F; Concourse	Lobby	Ticket Machines, Customer Service, Automatic Vending Machines
B2F; Platforms	Platform	16 towards Yuanshan Xikeng (Xintangwei)
B2F; Platforms	Island platform, doors will open on the left
B2F; Platforms	Platform	16 towards Tianxin (Baolong Tongle)

== Exits ==
Exit		Destination
Exit A	A1	Shenxian Road (N), Chishigang Village (W), Fuye Commodity Wholesale City, Hongjing Spring, Juntai Jinxi Mansion, Yiwu Small Commodity Wholesale City
Exit A	A2	Shenxian Road (S), Lavande Hotel, Yuxian Primary School, Dapu No.2 Village, Avia Couple Hospital
Exit A	A3	Ainan Road (E), Longgang District Famous Star School, Yinlong Industrial Science and Technology Park
Exit B		Shenxian Road (S), Tongle Expressway intersection, New Dakeng Community
Exit C		Shenxian Road (N), China SCE Four Seasons Sunshine Community, Jiayuye Logistics Industrial Park, Chishigang Village (E), Tongxin Experimental School
Exit D		Ainan Road (E), CITIC Longsheng Plaza, Hengyu Jiacheng
