= Liuhe station =

Shenzhen Metro Line 16 station

Liuhe 六和
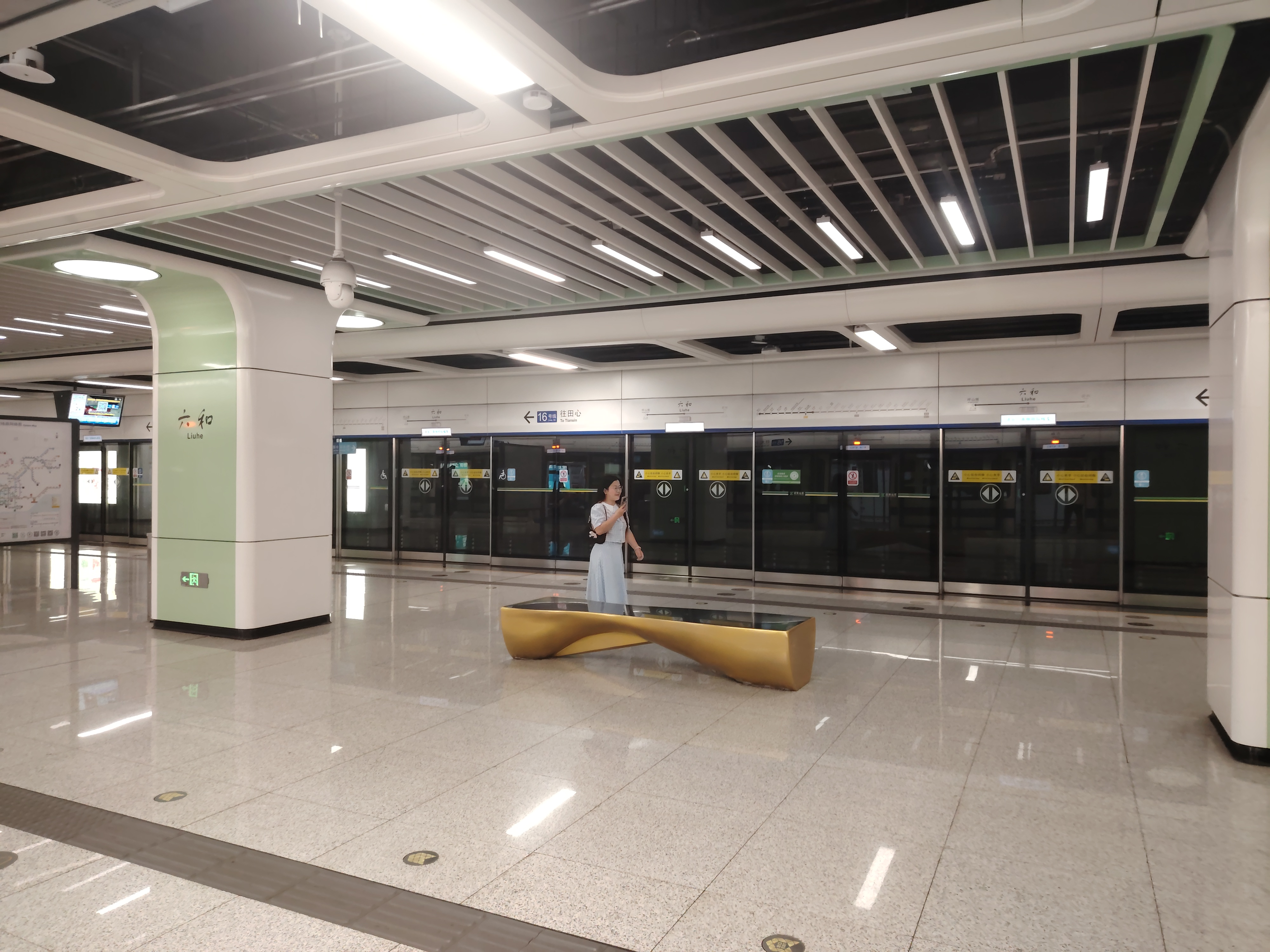
- Platform

Chinese name
- Chinese: 六和
Transcriptions
Standard Mandarin
- Hanyu Pinyin: Liùhé
Yue: Cantonese
- Yale Romanization: Luhkwò
- Jyutping: Luk6 Wo4

General information
- Location: Intersection of Shenxian Road and Dongjiang Road; Pingshan Subdistrict, Pingshan District, Shenzhen, Guangdong; China
- Coordinates: 22°41′55.10″N 114°19′56.39″E
- Operated by: SZMC (Shenzhen Metro Group)
- Line: Line 16
- Platforms: 2 (1 island platform)
- Tracks: 2

Construction
- Structure type: Underground
- Accessible: Yes

History
- Opened: 28 December 2022; 3 years ago

Services
Preceding station	Shenzhen Metro	Following station
Xinhe towards Yuanshan Xikeng	Line 16	Pingshanwei towards Tianxin
Location

Liuhe station (Chinese: 六和; pinyin: Liùhé; Cantonese Yale: Luhkwò) is a station on Line 16 of Shenzhen Metro. It opened on 28 December 2022.

== Station layout ==
The station has an island platform under Baoshan 2nd Industrial Zone North next to Shenxian Road.

G	-	Exits A & B
B1F; Concourse	Lobby	Ticket Machines, Customer Service, Automatic Vending Machines
B2F; Platforms	Platform	16 towards Yuanshan Xikeng (Xinhe)
B2F; Platforms	Island platform, doors will open on the left
B2F; Platforms	Platform	16 towards Tianxin (Pingshanwei)

== Exits ==
Exit		Destination
Exit A	A1	Baoshan 2nd Industrial Zone
Exit A	A2	Shenxian Road (N), Pingshan District Center for Disease Control and Prevention
Exit A	A3	Shenxian Road (S), Henglingtang Science and Technology Enclosed Community
Exit B	B1	Shenxian Road (S), Pingshan Square, Liuhe City, Liulian Primary School
Exit B	B2	Shenxian Road (N), Pingshan Liulian Kindergarten, Pingshan College of Shenzhen Open University

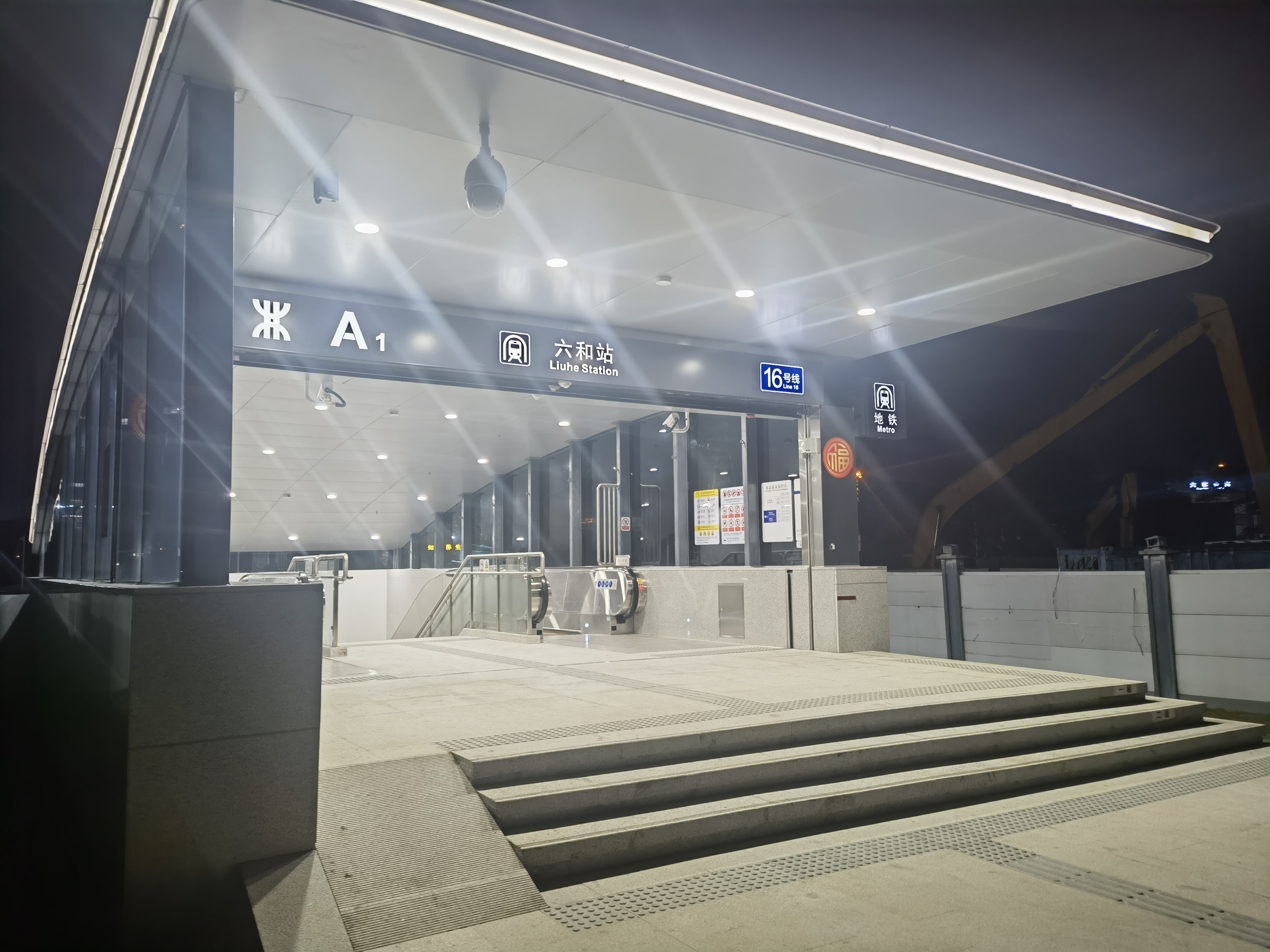
Entrance A1

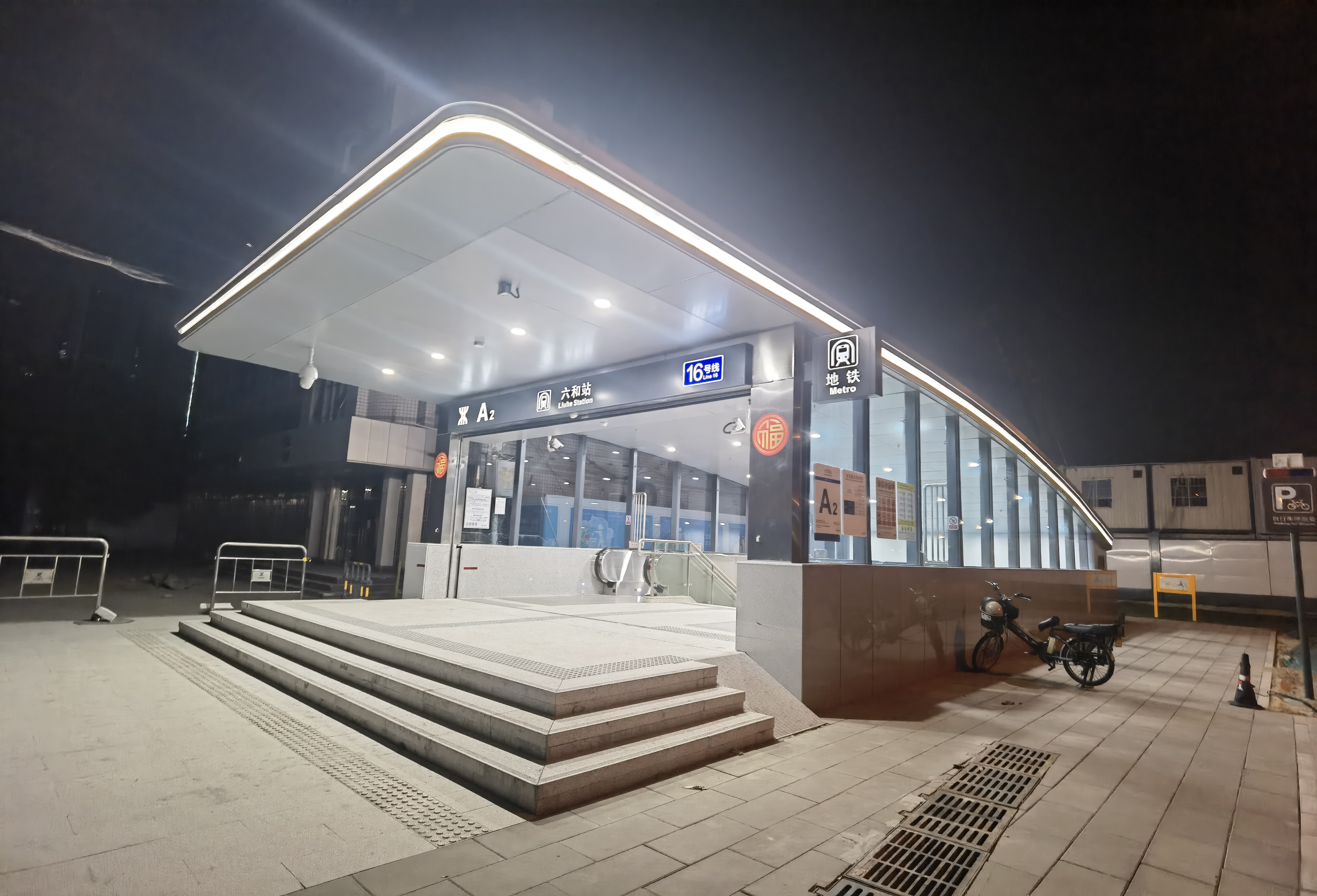
Entrance A2

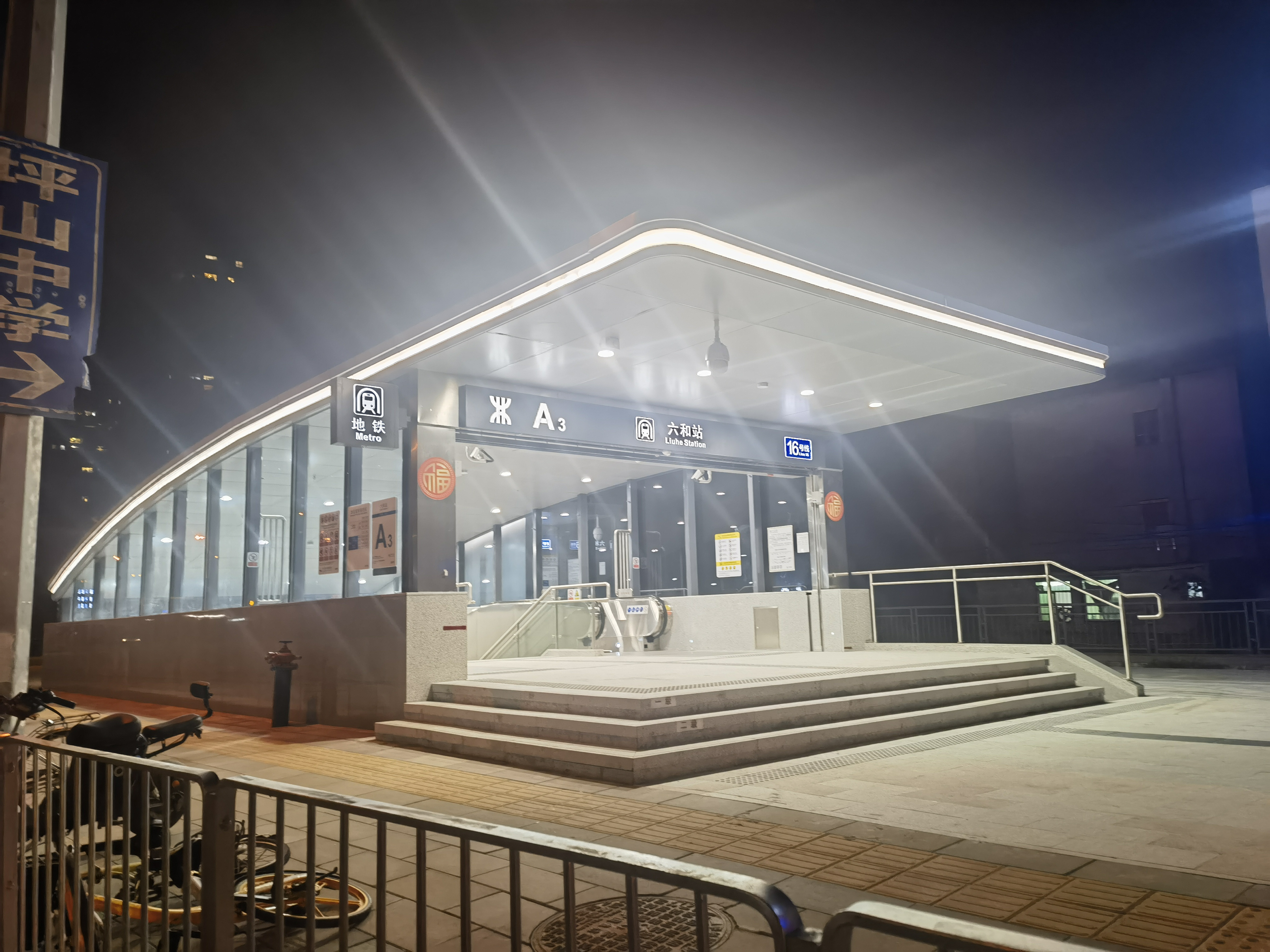
Entrance A3

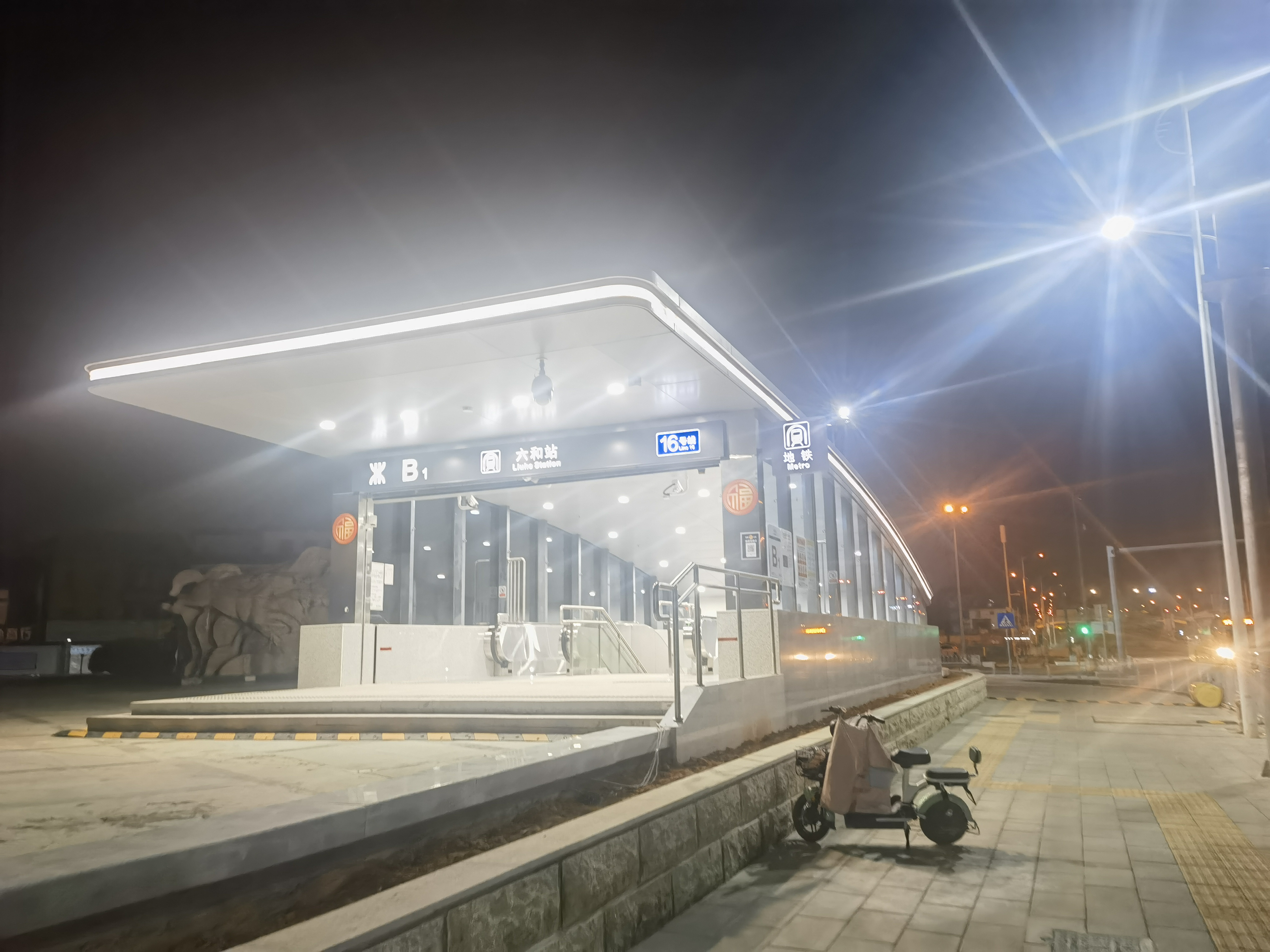
Entrance B1

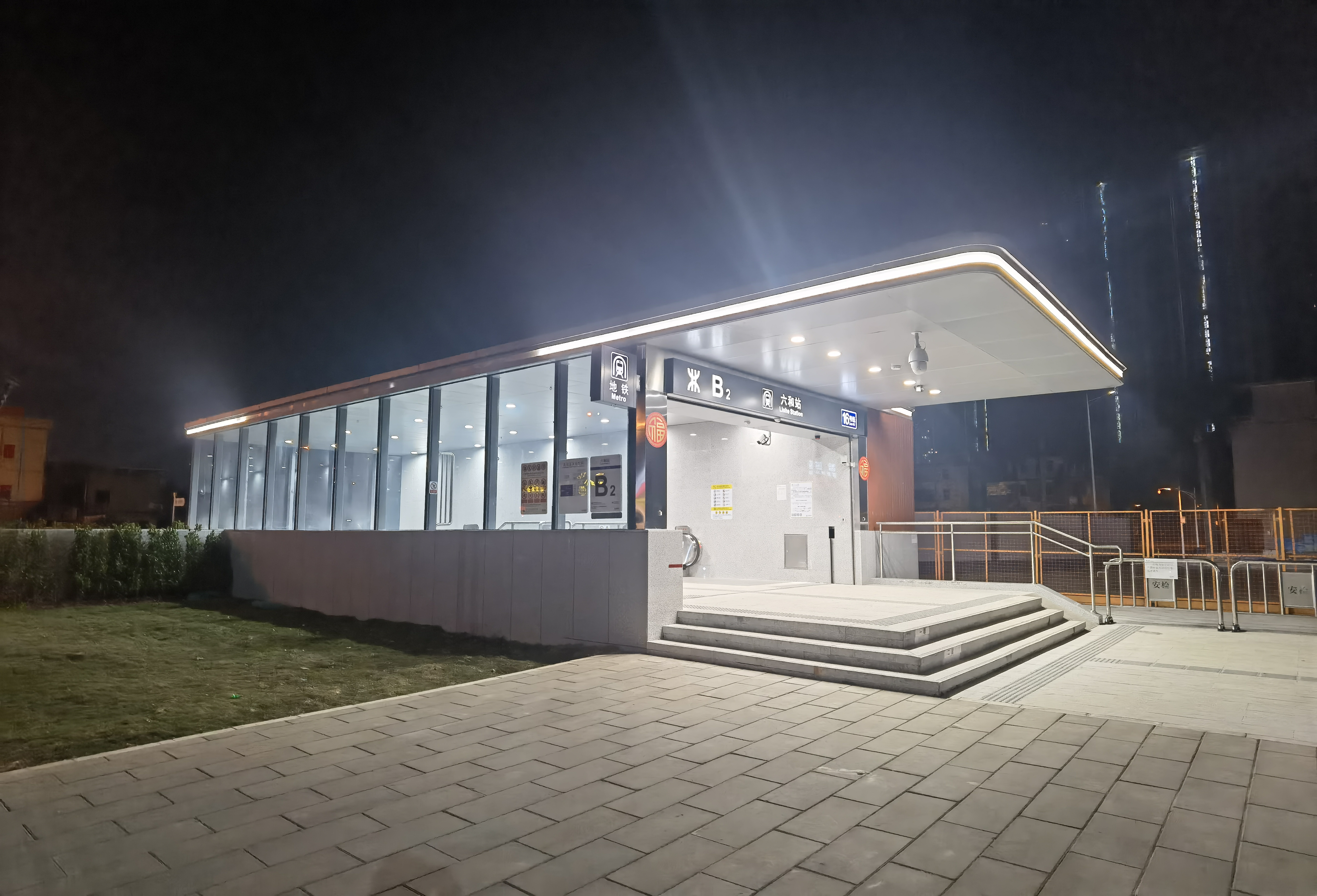
Entrance B2
