= Pingshan station (Shenzhen Metro) =

Shenzhen Metro Line 16 and Pingshan SkyShuttle station

Pingshan 坪山
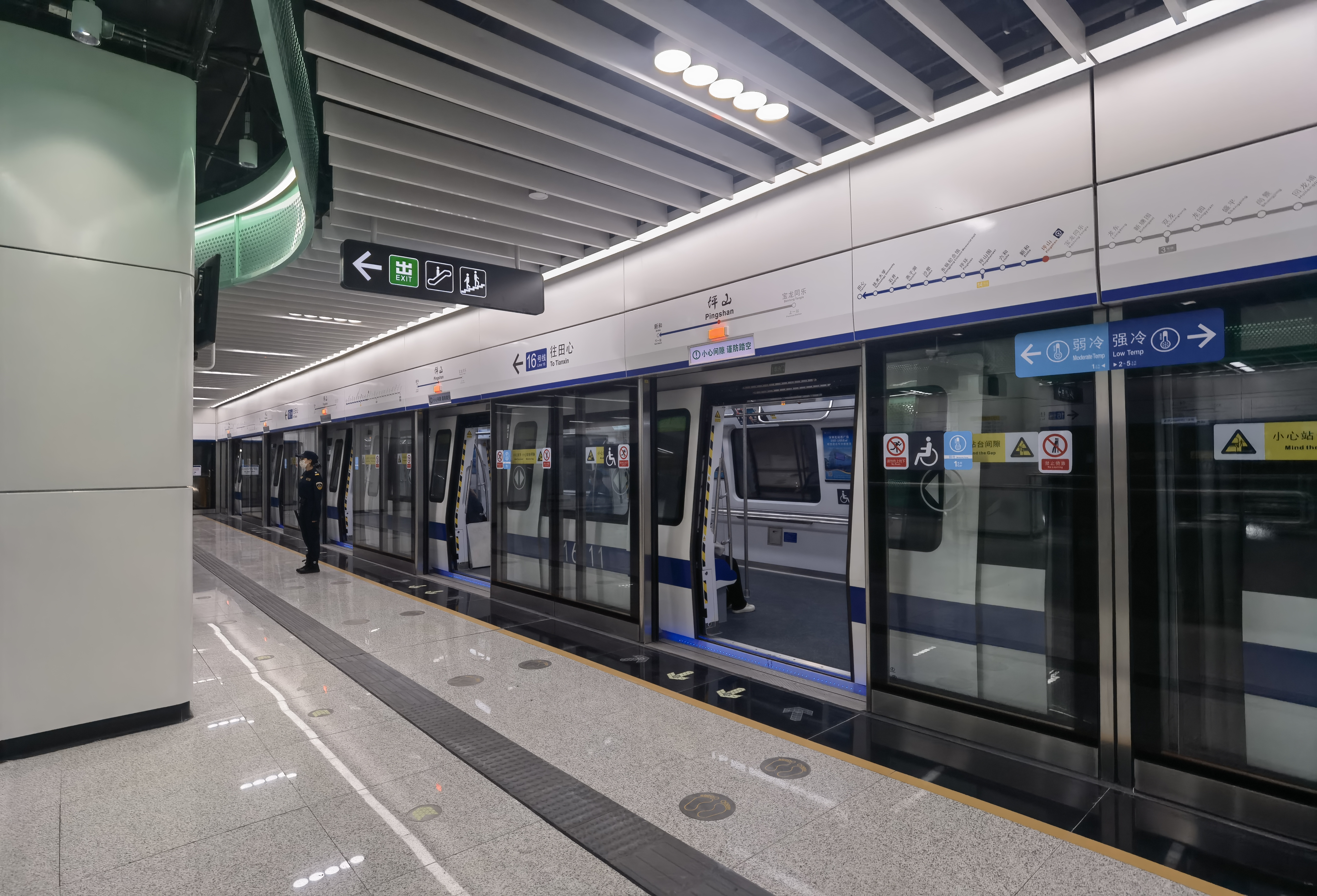
- Platform 1 of Pingshan station

Chinese name
- Chinese: 坪山
Transcriptions
Standard Mandarin
- Hanyu Pinyin: Píngshān
Yue: Cantonese
- Yale Romanization: Pìhngsāan
- Jyutping: Ping4 Saan1

General information
- Location: South side of Station Front Road of Shenzhen Pingshan railway station Baolong Subdistrict, Longgang District, Shenzhen, Guangdong; China
- Coordinates: 22°42′30.38″N 114°19′21.54″E
- Operated by: SZMC (Shenzhen Metro Group)
- Line: Line 16
- Platforms: 2 (1 island platform)
- Tracks: 2
- Connections: Line 1 (Pingshan SkyShuttle)

Construction
- Structure type: Underground
- Accessible: Yes

History
- Opened: 28 December 2022; 3 years ago

Services
Preceding station	Shenzhen Metro	Following station
Baolong Tongle towards Yuanshan Xikeng	Line 16	Xinhe towards Tianxin
Location

Pingshan station (Chinese: 坪山; pinyin: Píngshān; Cantonese Yale: Pìhngsāan) is a metro station on Line 16 of Shenzhen Metro. It was opened on 28 December 2022. Located at Longgang District, it is connected to the Shenzhen Pingshan railway station on the Xiamen–Shenzhen railway. Construction of the station finished in 2021 along with other stations at Pingshan District.

== Station layout ==
The station has an island platform at the south of Zhanqian (Station's Front) Road.

G	–	Exit
B1F; Concourse	Lobby	Ticket Machines, Customer Service, Automatic Vending Machines
B2F	Mezzanine	Station Equipment
B3F; Platforms	Platform	16 Line 16 towards Yuanshan Xikeng (Baolong Tongle)
B3F; Platforms	Island platform, doors will open on the left
B3F; Platforms	Platform	16 Line 16 towards Tianxin (Xinhe)

== Exits ==
Exit	Destination
Exit A	Pingshan High-speed railway station [zh] on the Line 1 of Pingshan SkyShuttle, Xukang second-hand trading center, Striving Square
Exit B	Lifeng Hotel, Concentric Cement Production Factory
Exit C	Southern Plaza of Shenzhen Pingshan railway station
Exit D	Southern Plaza of Pingshan railway station

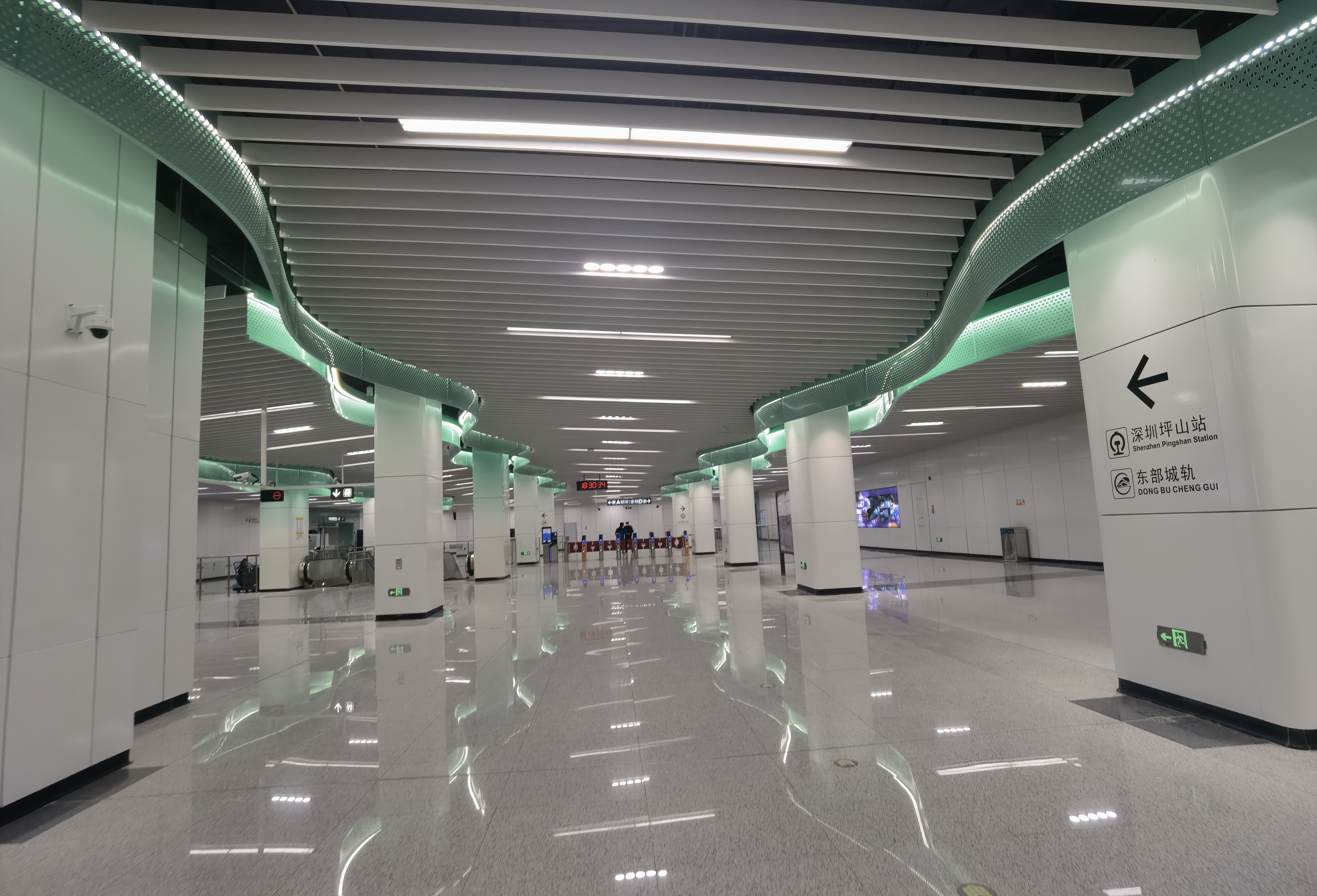
Concourse

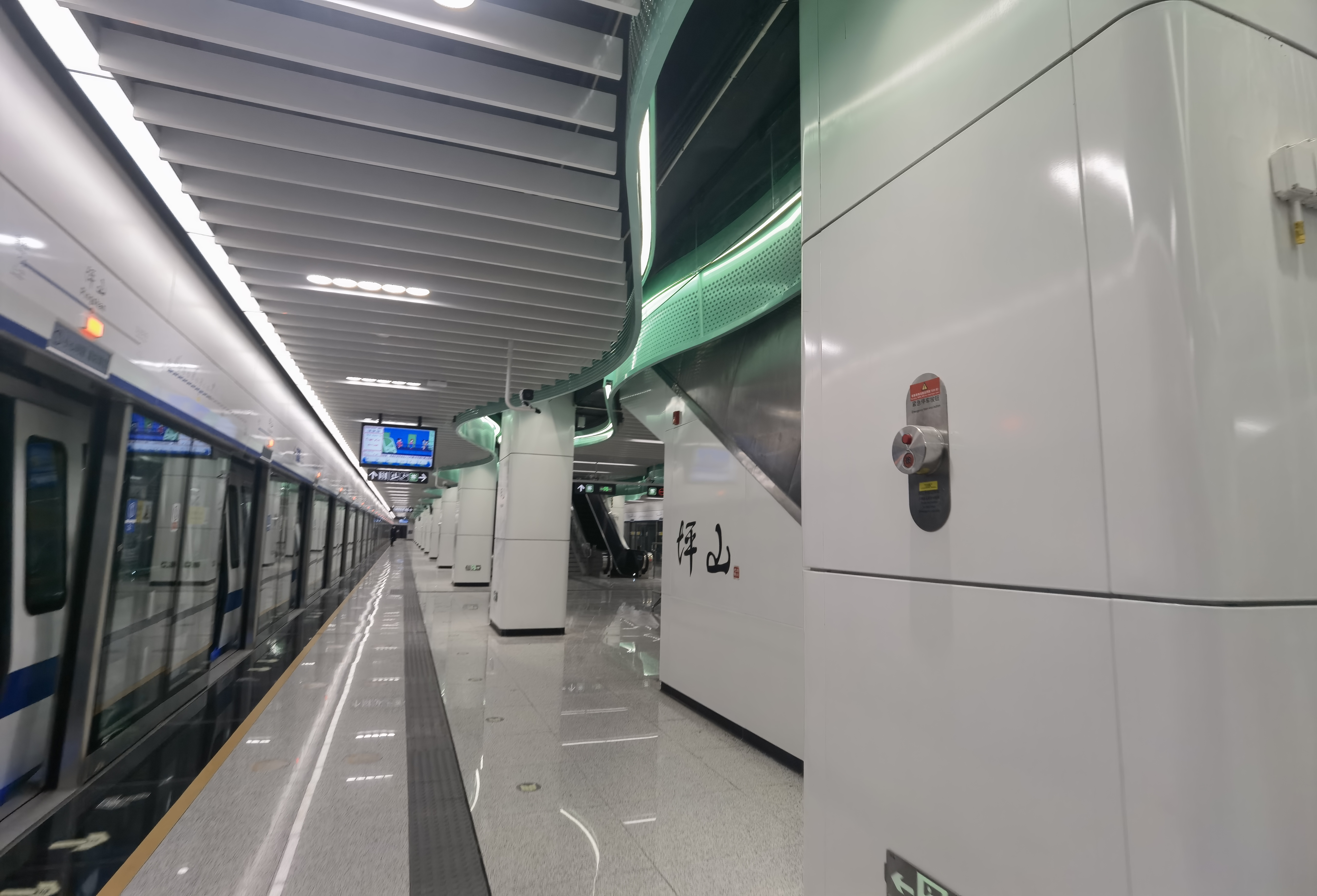
Platform 2

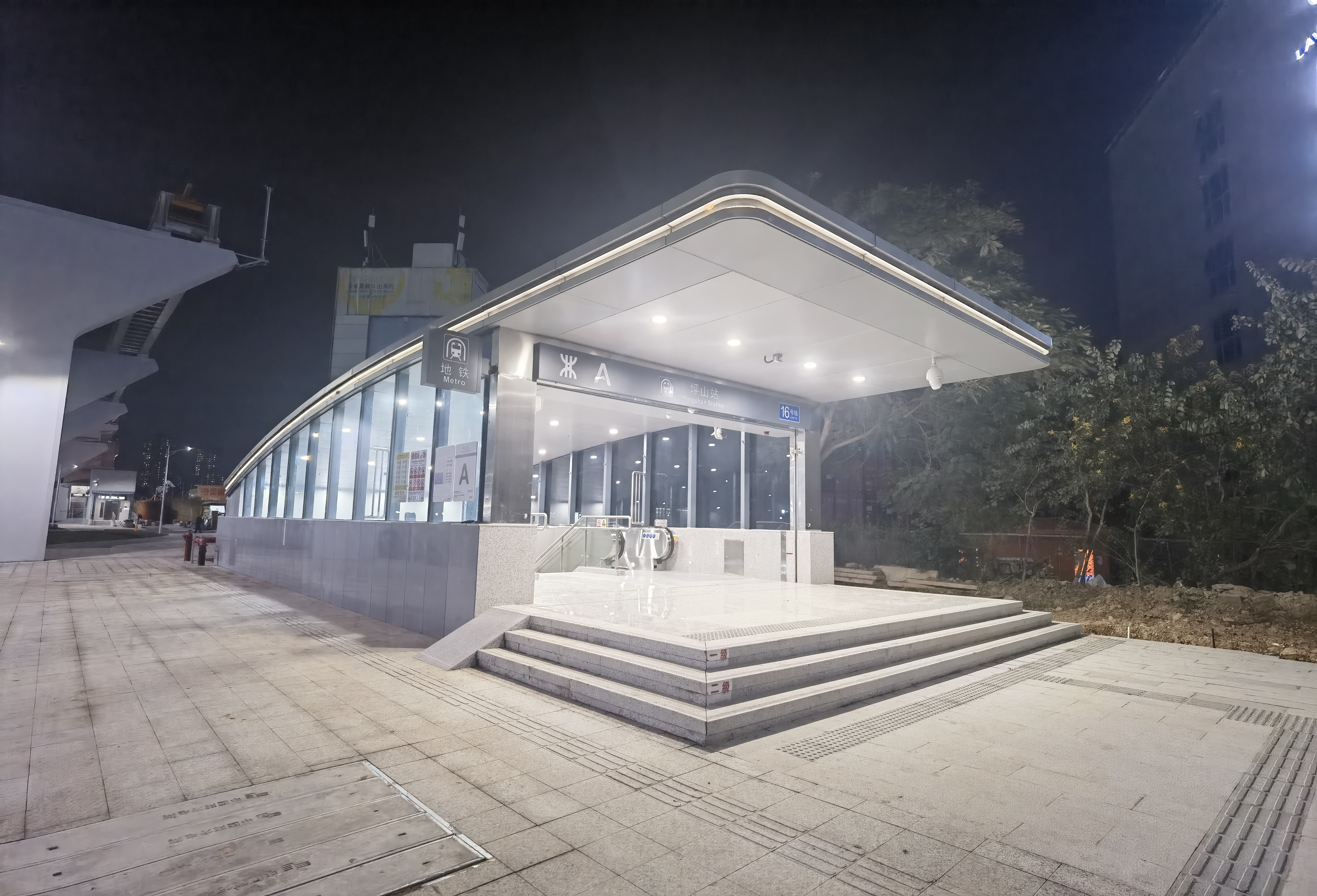
Exit A

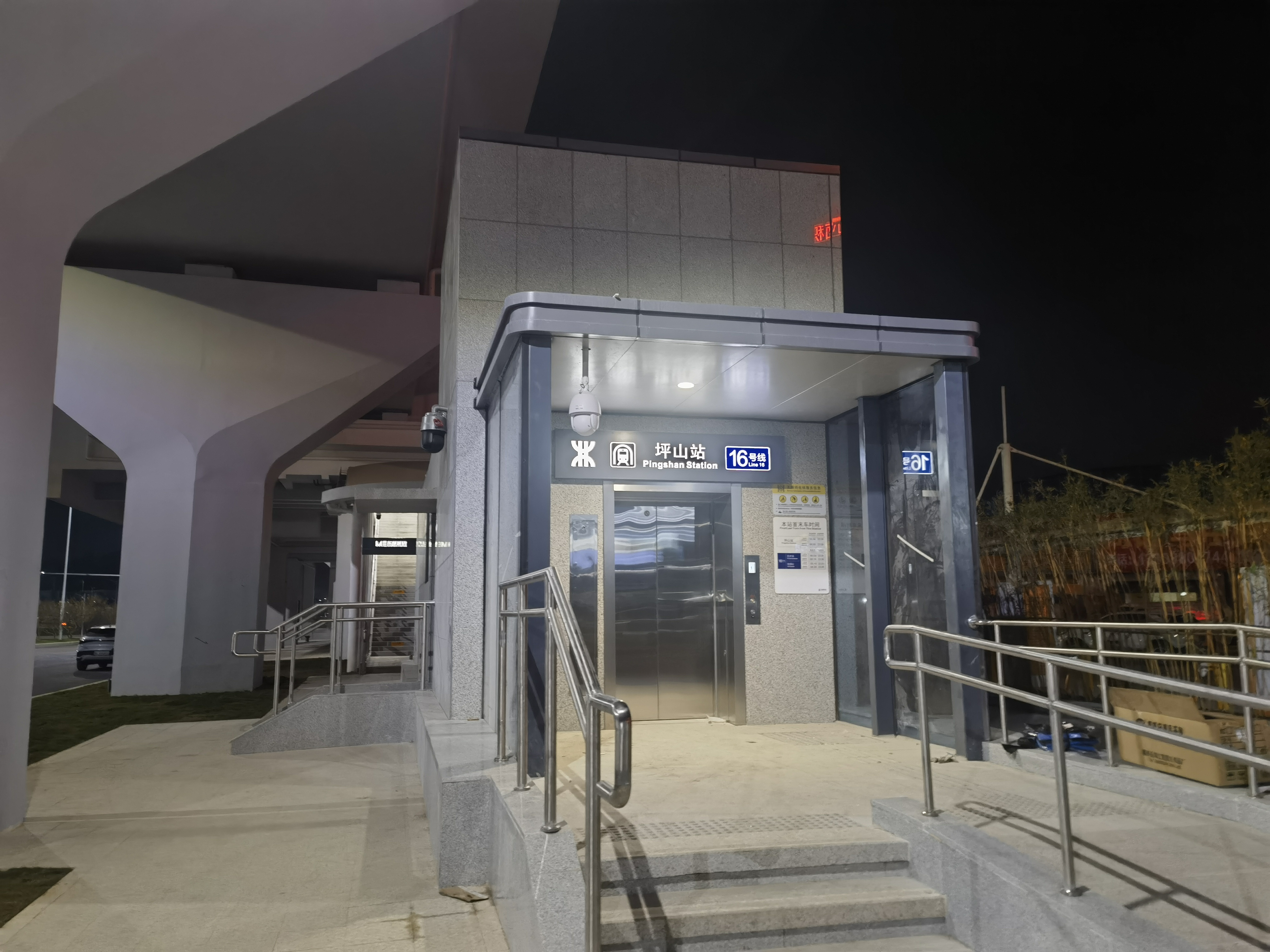
Lift of Exit A

== Connections ==
The station is connected to CRH's Xiamen–Shenzhen railway's Shenzhen Pingshan railway station; it is accessible from Exits C and D. It is also connected to the Pingshan High-speed railway station [zh] on the Line 1 of Pingshan SkyShuttle, which was opened on the same day of this station's opening; it is accessible from Exit A.

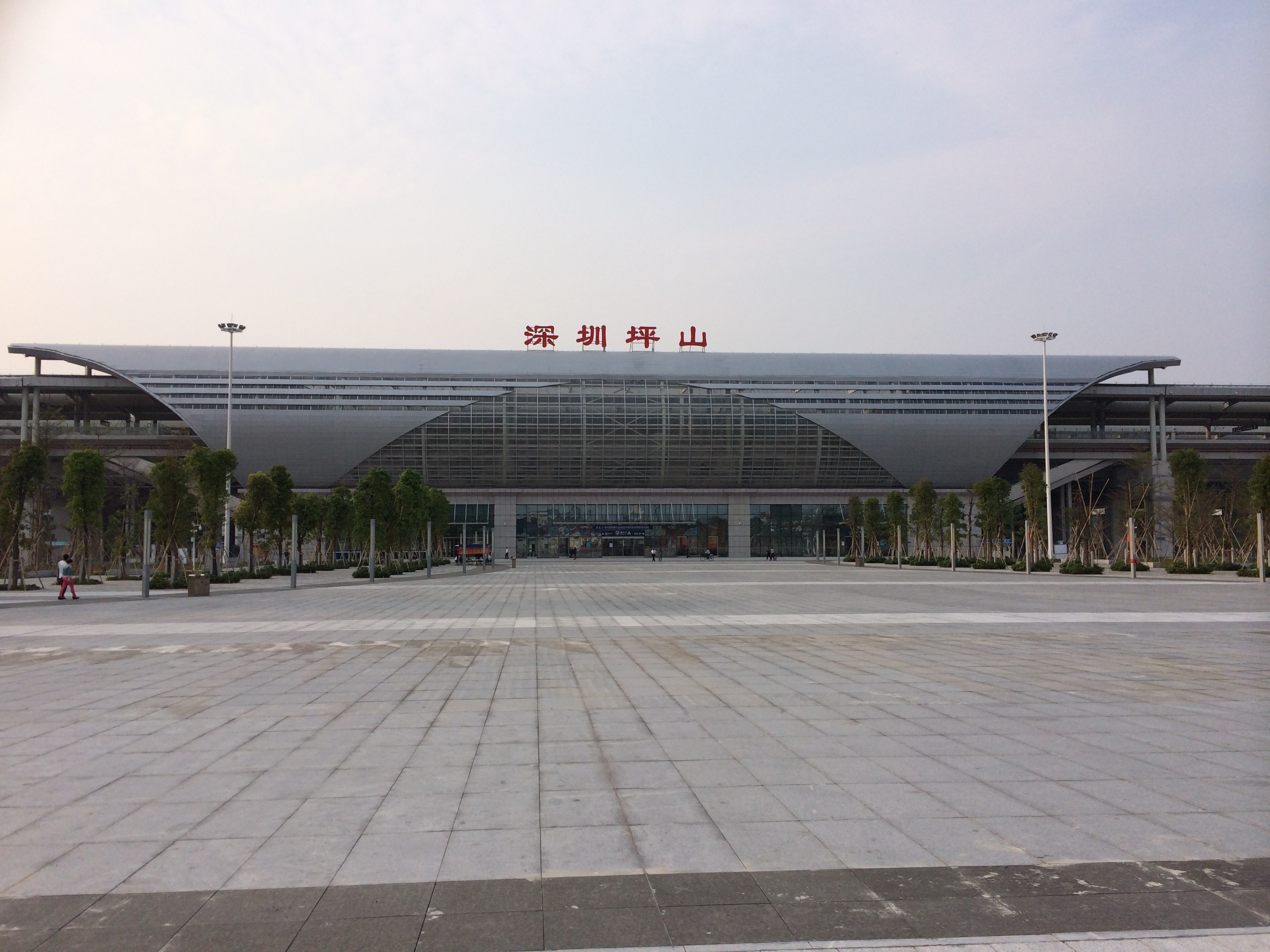
Shenzhen Pingshan railway station

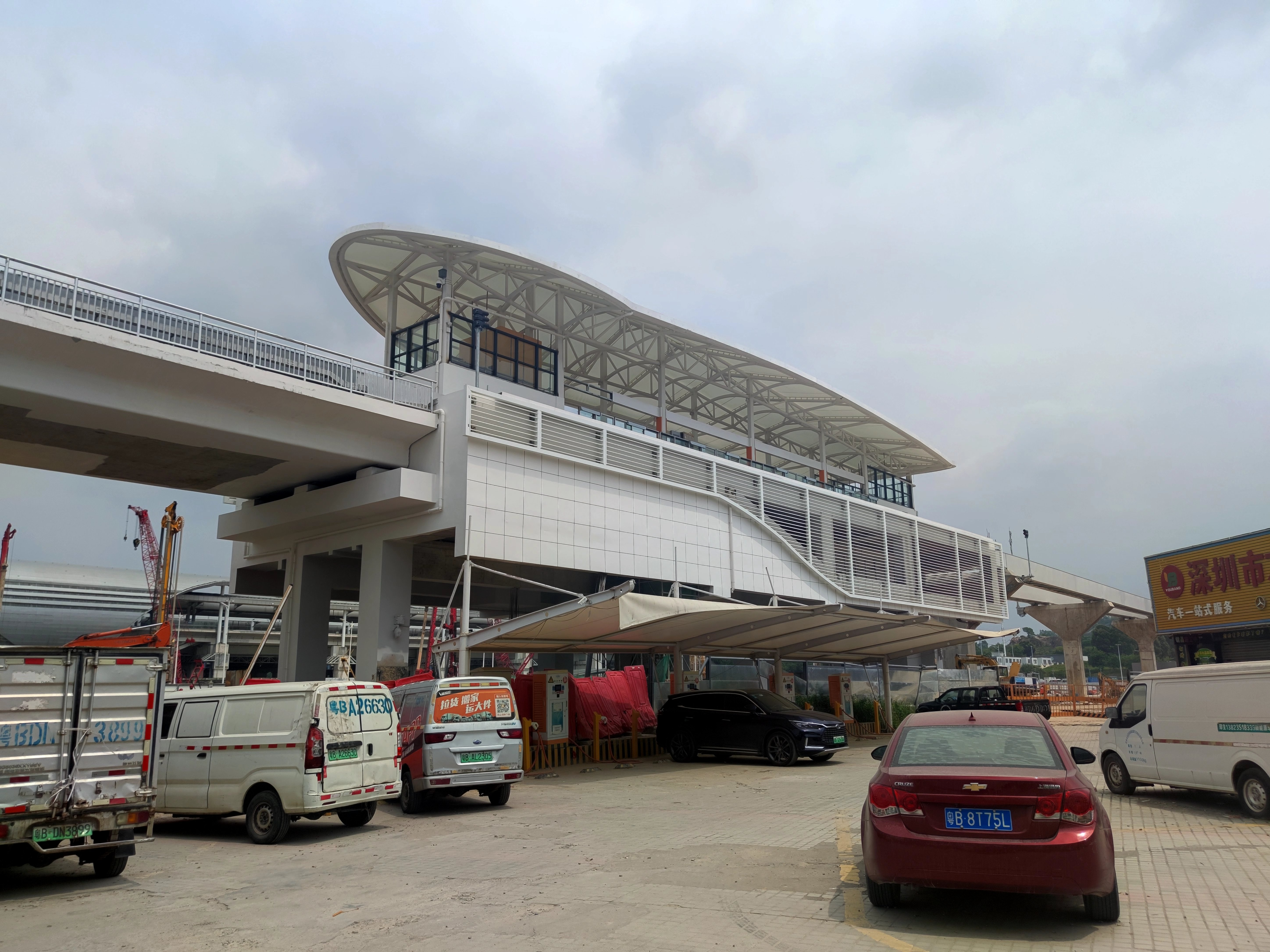
Pingshan SkyShuttle station

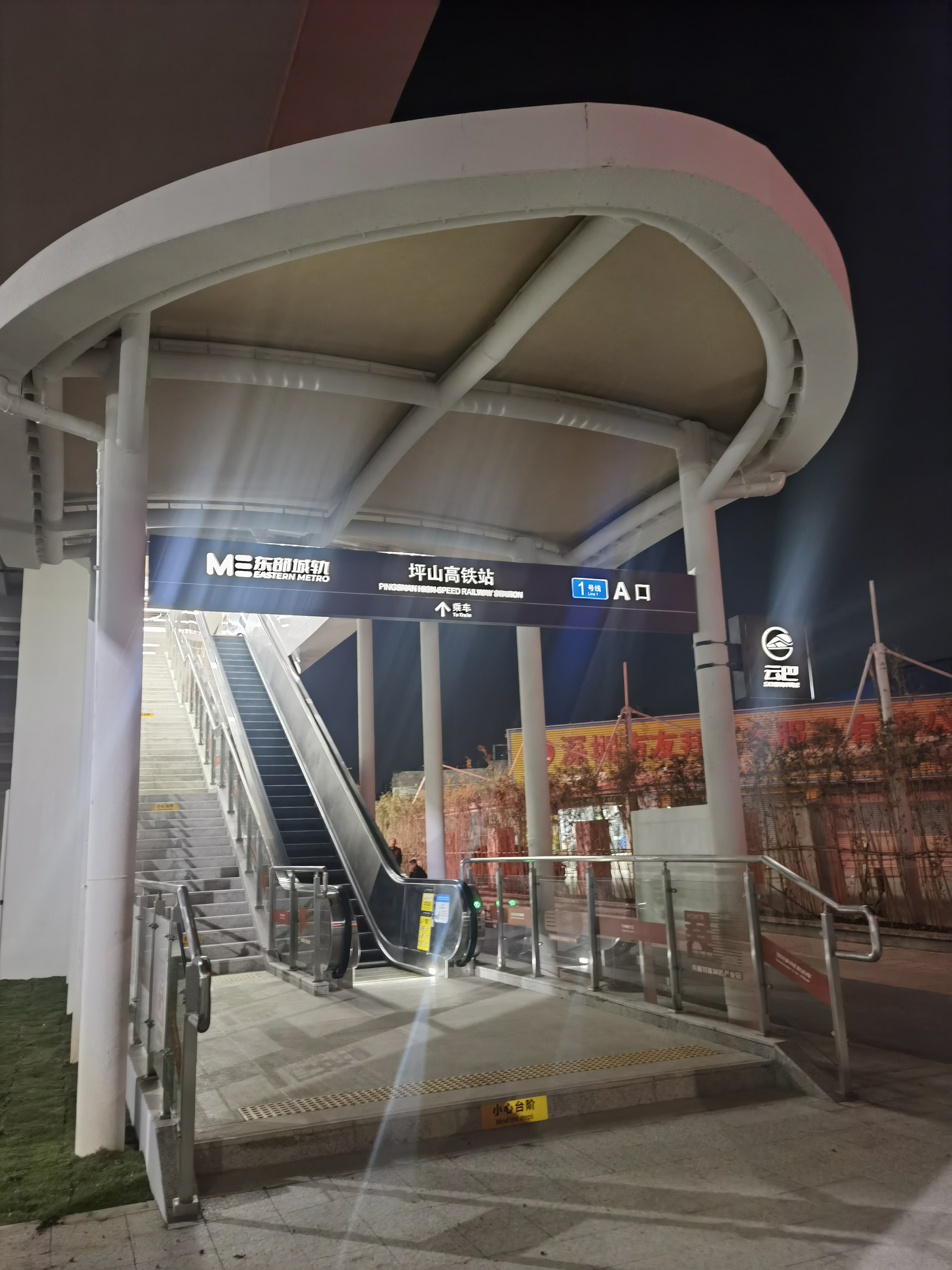
Exit A of the Pingshan SkyShuttle station
