= Xinhe station (Shenzhen Metro) =

Shenzhen Metro Line 16 station

Xinhe 新和
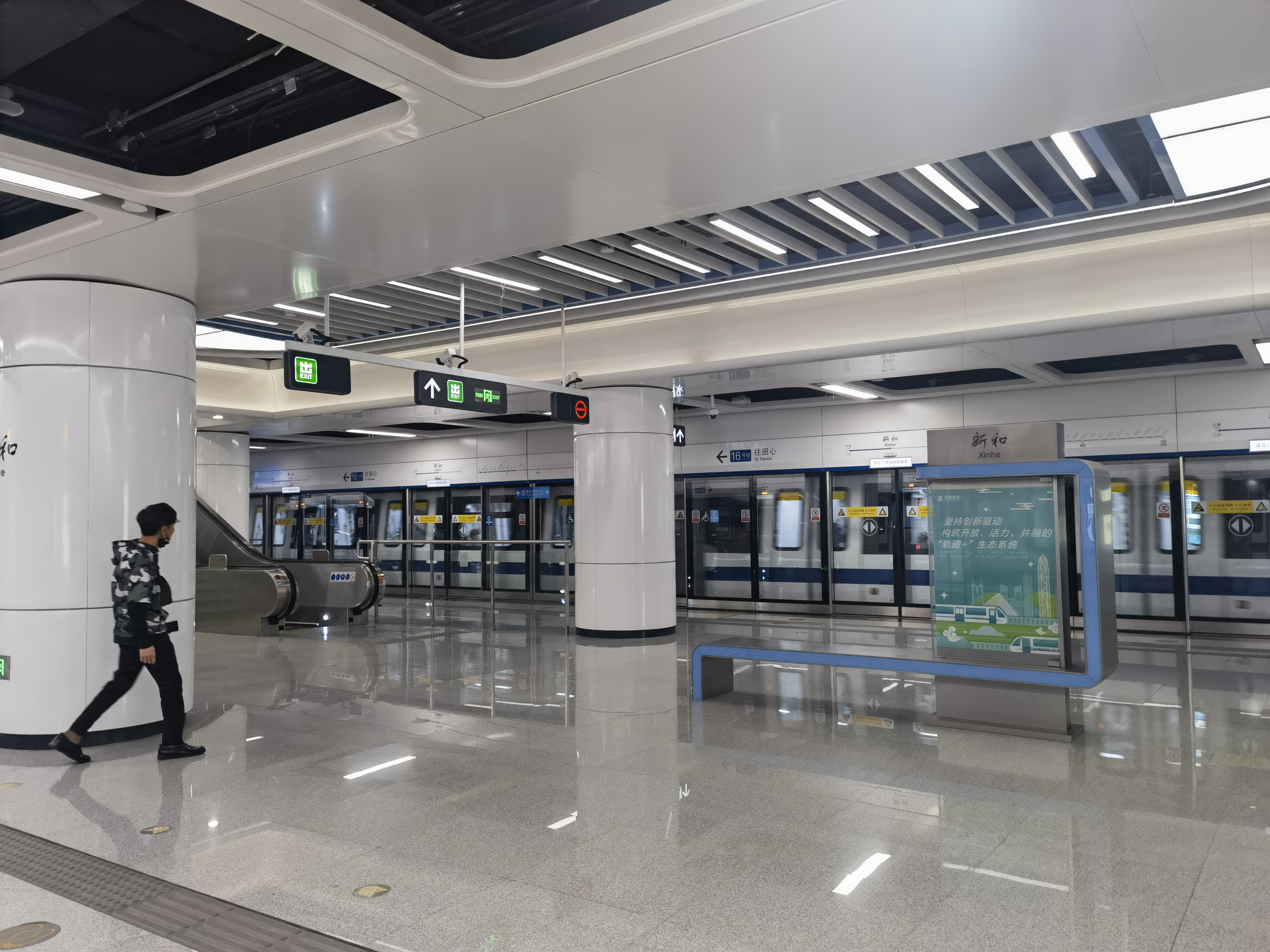
- Platform

Chinese name
- Chinese: 新和
Transcriptions
Standard Mandarin
- Hanyu Pinyin: Xīnhé
Yue: Cantonese
- Yale Romanization: Sānwò
- Jyutping: San1 Wo4

General information
- Location: Xinhe Estate, Liuhe Community, Longping Road; Pingshan Subdistrict, Pingshan District, Shenzhen, Guangdong; China
- Coordinates: 22°42′22.36″N 114°19′49.15″E
- Operated by: SZMC (Shenzhen Metro Group)
- Line: Line 16
- Platforms: 2 (1 island platform)
- Tracks: 2

Construction
- Structure type: Underground
- Accessible: Yes

History
- Opened: 28 December 2022; 3 years ago

Services
Preceding station	Shenzhen Metro	Following station
Pingshan towards Yuanshan Xikeng	Line 16	Liuhe towards Tianxin
Location

Xinhe station (Chinese: 新和; pinyin: Xīnhé; Cantonese Yale: Sānwò) is a station on Line 16 of Shenzhen Metro. It opened on 28 December 2022. It is located in Pingshan District under Baoshan 2nd Industrial Zone North.

== Future development ==
In 2028, this station will feature an interchange with Line 19.

== Station layout ==
The station has an island platform under Baoshan 2nd Industrial Zone North near Xinhe Road.

G	-	Exits A-D
B1F; Concourse	Lobby	Ticket Machines, Customer Service, Automatic Vending Machines
B2F; Platforms	Platform	16 towards Yuanshan Xikeng (Pingshan)
B2F; Platforms	Island platform, doors will open on the left
B2F; Platforms	Platform	16 towards Tianxin (Liuhe)

== Exits ==
Exit	Destination
Exit A	Changsheng Road (W), Pei Ying School
Exit B	Changsheng Road (W), Baoshan 2nd Industrial Zone
Exit C	Changsheng Road (E), Baoshan 2nd Industrial Zone, Jiahua Lingyue Plaza, Xinhe Hospital-style Community
Exit D	Changsheng Road (E), Changhuwei Community
