= Shenzhen Pingshan railway station =

Railway station in Shenzhen, Guangdong, China

Coordinates: 22.7102°N 114.3223°E

Shenzhen Pingshan 深圳坪山
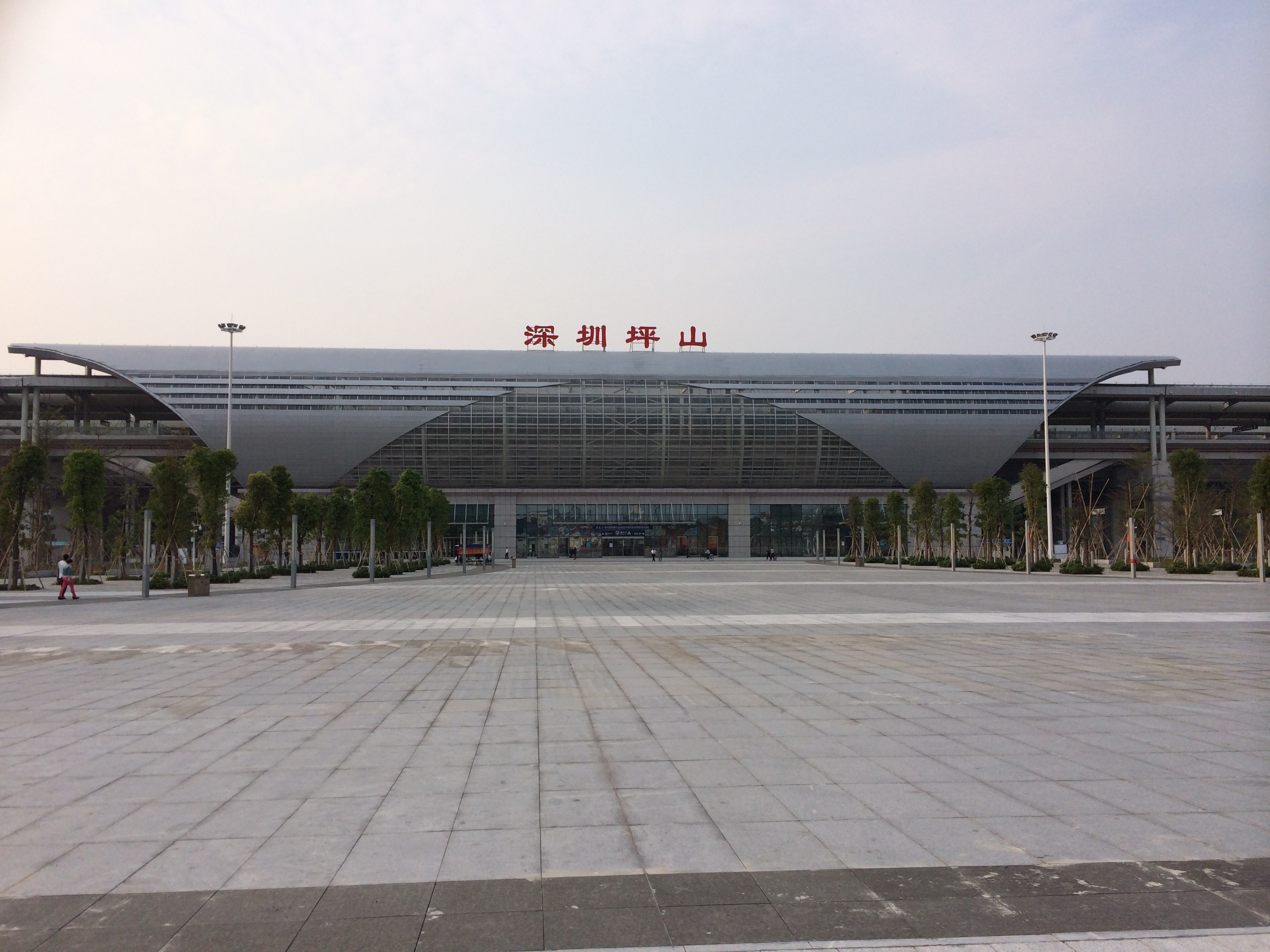
- Shenzhen Pingshan railway station

General information
- Location: Pingshan District, Shenzhen, Guangdong; China
- Operated by: China Railway Guangzhou Group; China Railway Corporation
- Line(s): Xiamen–Shenzhen railway Shenzhen–Shanwei high-speed railway (under construction); Shenzhen–Dayawan intercity railway (planned)
- Platforms: 4 (high level)

Other information
- Station code: TMIS code: 65862; Telegraph code: IFQ; Pinyin code: SZS

History
- Opened: 28 December 2013; 11 years ago
- Previous names: Shenzhen East; Shenzhen Xincheng

Shenzhen Pingshan railway station (Chinese: 深圳坪山站; pinyin: Shēnzhèn Píngshān Zhàn; Jyutping: sam1 zan3 ping4 saan1 zaam6) is a high-speed railway station on the Xiamen–Shenzhen Railway. The station is located in the Pingshan District of Shenzhen City, Guangdong Province, China. The station opened to the public on 28 December 2013.

== Name ==
It was originally designated as Shenzhen East railway station in initial government announcements. However this former name has now been used to rename Buji railway station as of December 2012. In February 2013, the name of Shenzhen Xincheng Station was adopted by the local railway bureau, however this was dismissed by national railway authorities in October 2013. This was due to existence of another Xincheng Station on the Chinese rail network. In order to avoid any repetition of names and to reflect localities better, it was deemed that the new station would be named Shenzhen Pingshan railway station, after the district of Shenzhen that it is located in.

== Structure ==
The station features four high level platforms served by eight tracks. Keeping with current modern practice in Chinese High Speed Rail Stations, two large open squares will feature on both sides of station. The southern square, besides being a large open public space. The Northern Square will provide access for private vehicles, long-distance and local bus services.

== Service ==
Once fully open and with a designed speed of 250 kilometers per hour, the Xiamen–Shenzhen High Speed Railway is expected to shorten the travel time between Shenzhen and Xiamen to three hours, eight hours shorter than the current trip. Ticket prices for the high-speed line are expected to be about 190 yuan for a first-class seat and 160 yuan for a second-class seat.

== Metro station ==
There is an adjacent metro station, called Pingshan station, on Line 16 of the Shenzhen Metro.

== See also ==
- Shenzhen railway station
- Shenzhen North railway station
- Shenzhen East railway station
- Shenzhen West railway station

Preceding station	China Railway High-speed	Following station
Huiyang towards Xiamen North	Xiamen–Shenzhen railway	Shenzhen North Terminus
