= Dongjiang Column Memorial Hall station =

Shenzhen Metro Line 16 station

Dongjiang Column Memorial Hall 东纵纪念馆
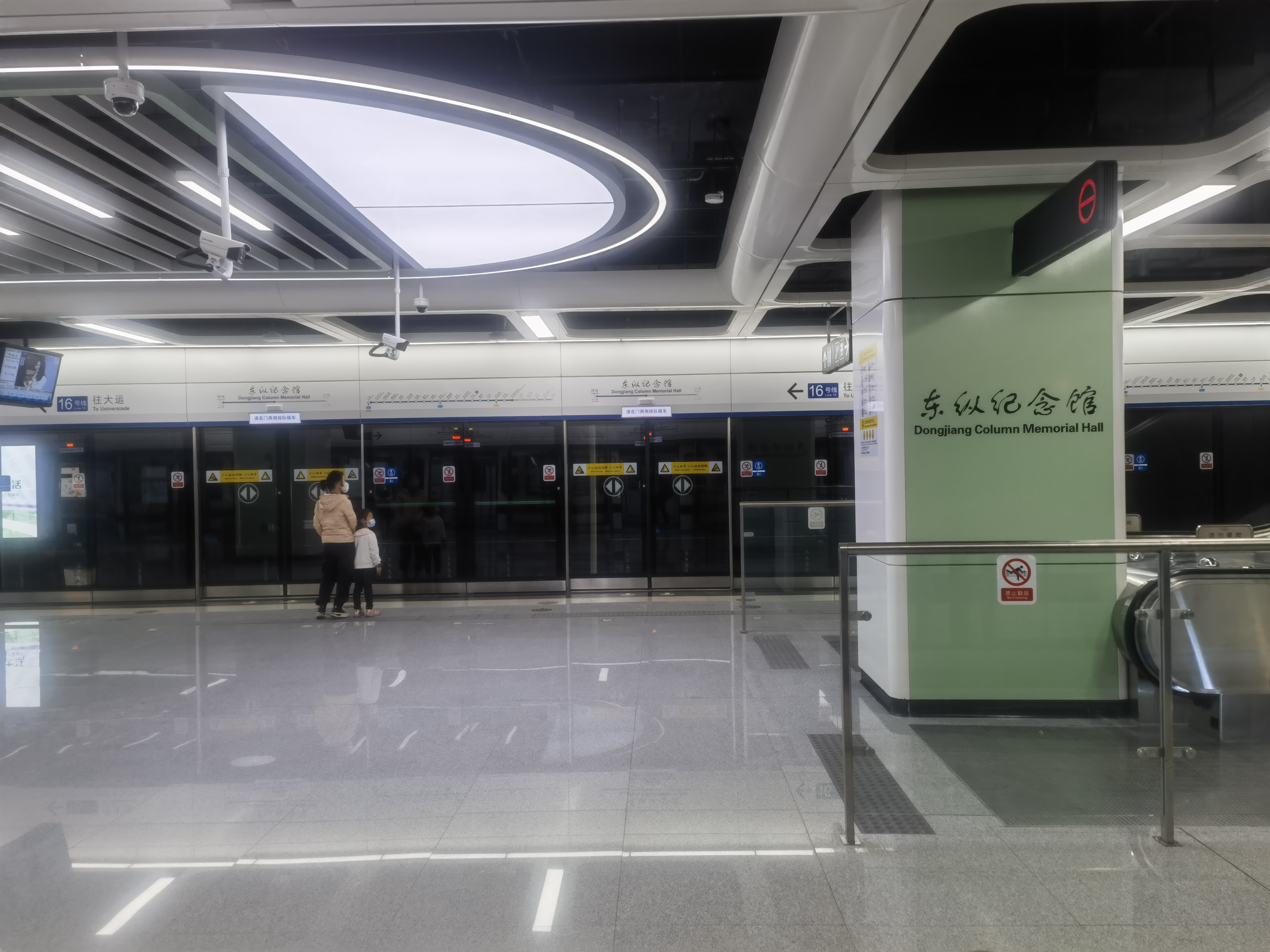
- Platform

Chinese name
- Traditional Chinese: 東縱紀念館
- Simplified Chinese: 东纵纪念馆
Transcriptions
Standard Mandarin
- Hanyu Pinyin: Dōngzòng Jìniànguǎn
Yue: Cantonese
- Yale Romanization: Dōngjung Géinihmgún
- Jyutping: Dung1 Zung3 Gei2 Nim6 Gun2

General information
- Location: Intersection of Dongzong Road, Jiangling Road and Sanyanghu Road; Border of Maluan Subdistrict and Pingshan Subdistricts, Pingshan District, Shenzhen, Guangdong; China
- Coordinates: 22°41′19.14″N 114°21′3.31″E
- Operated by: SZMC (Shenzhen Metro Group)
- Line: Line 16
- Platforms: 2 (1 island platform)
- Tracks: 2
- Connections: Pingshan SkyShuttle Line 1 (at Longbei)

Construction
- Structure type: Underground
- Accessible: Yes

History
- Opened: 28 December 2022; 2 years ago

Services
Preceding station	Shenzhen Metro	Following station
Pinghuan towards Yuanshan Xikeng	Line 16	Shabo towards Tianxin
Location

Dongjiang Column Memorial Hall station (simplified Chinese: 东纵纪念馆; traditional Chinese: 東縱紀念館; pinyin: Dōngzòng Jìniànguǎn; Cantonese Yale: Dōngjung Géinihmgún) is a station on Line 16 of Shenzhen Metro. It opened on 28 December 2022.

== Station layout ==
The station has an island platform under Dongzong Road.

G	-	Exits A-D
B1F; Concourse	Lobby	Ticket Machines, Customer Service, Automatic Vending Machines
B2F; Platforms	Platform	16 towards Yuanshan Xikeng (Pinghuan)
B2F; Platforms	Island platform, doors will open on the left
B2F; Platforms	Platform	16 towards Tianxin (Shabo)

== Exits ==
Exit	Destination
Exit A	Dongzong Road (S), Pingshan Branch of Shenzhen Social Security Fund Administration, Chuangye Road, Jiangling Cultural Square, Jiangling Community
Exit B	Dongzong Road (S), Jiangling Community, Jiangling East Road, Maluan Community Grid Management Squadron
Exit C	Dongzong Road (N), Longbei Primary School, Sanyanghu Kindergarten, Sanyanghu Road, Sanyanghu Laowei Community, Longbei Station of Pingshan SkyShuttle Line 1
Exit D	Dongzong Road (N), Sanyang Lake Community Health Center, East River Column Memorial Hall

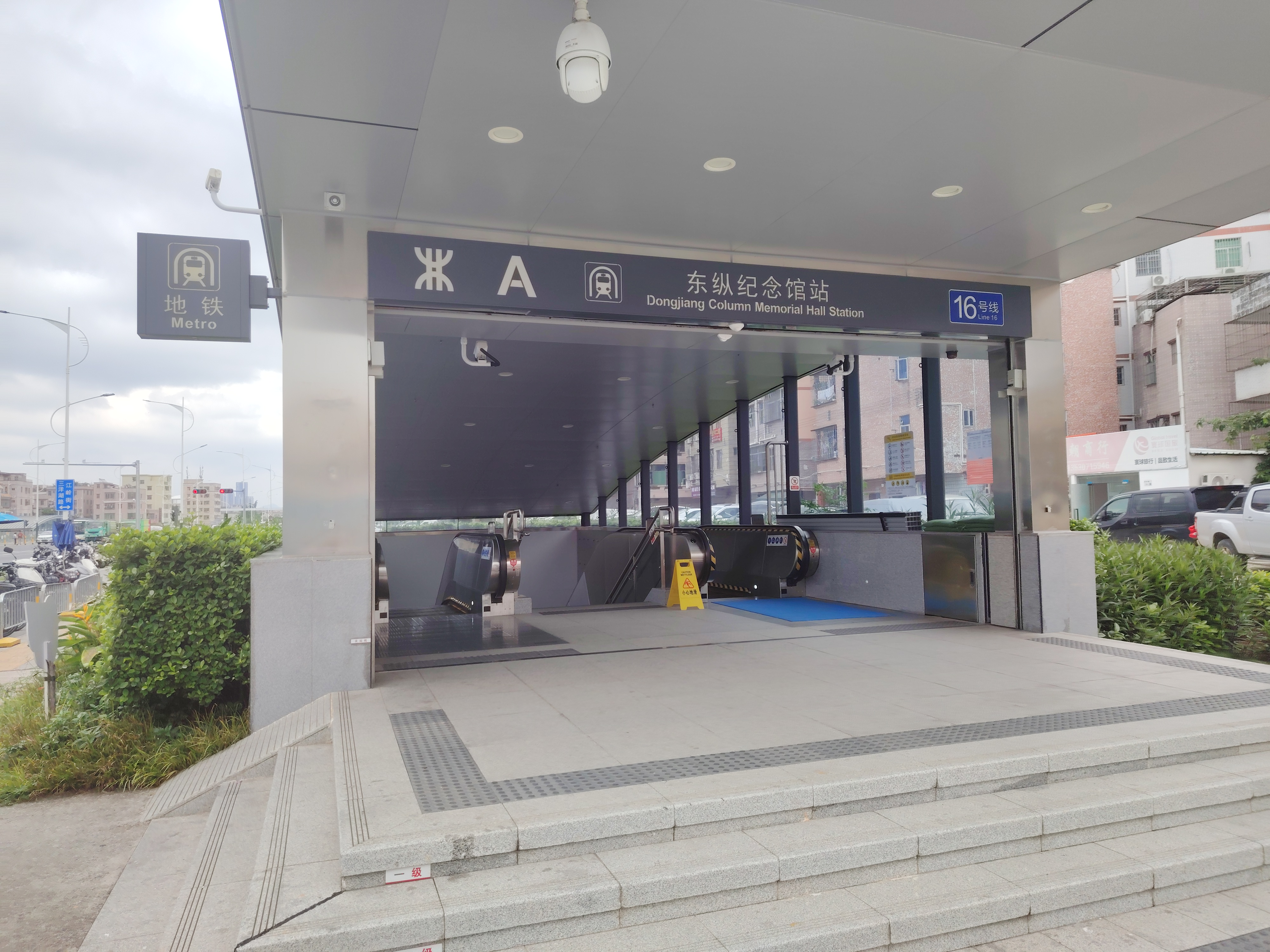
Entrance A

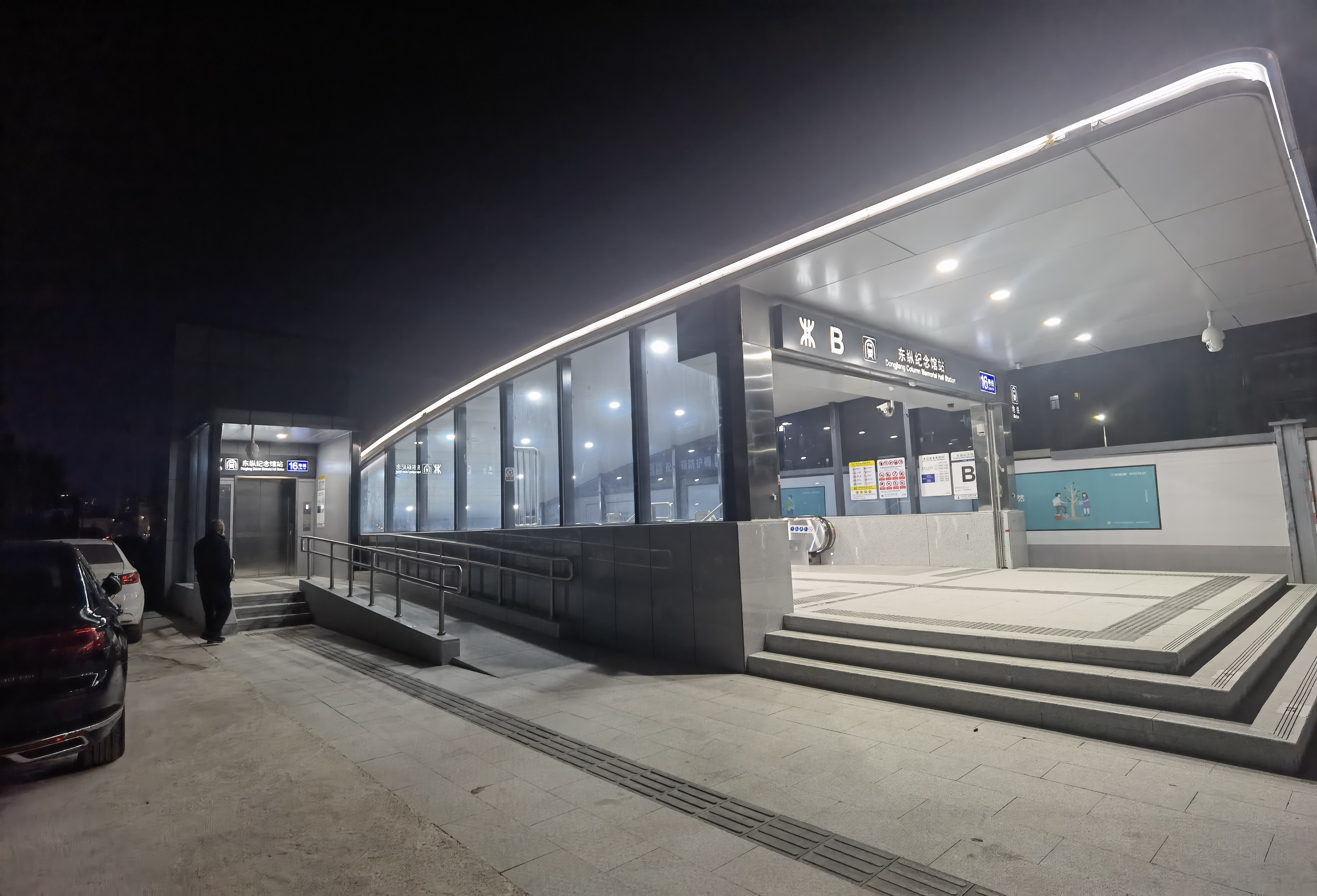
Entrance B

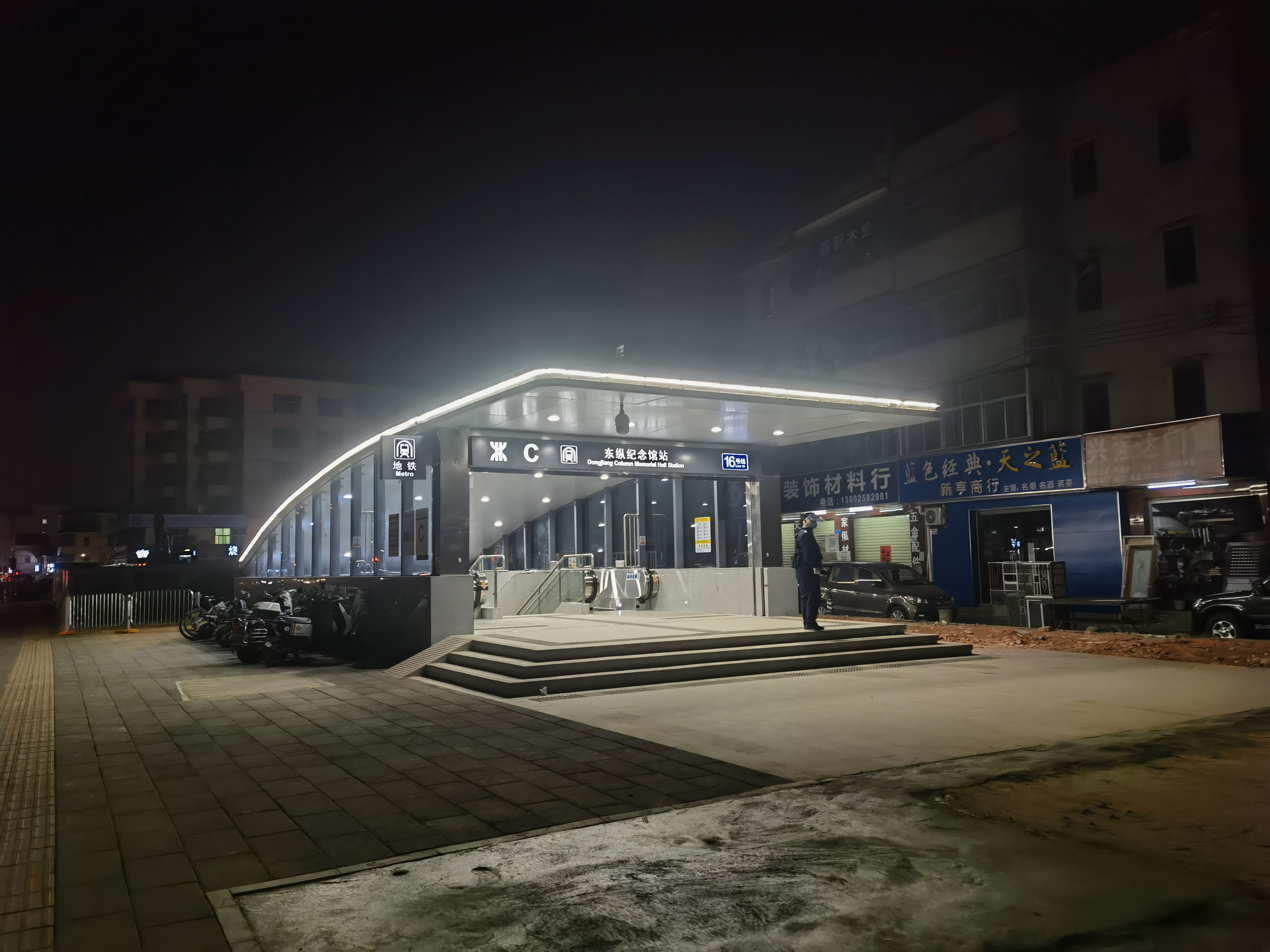
Entrance C

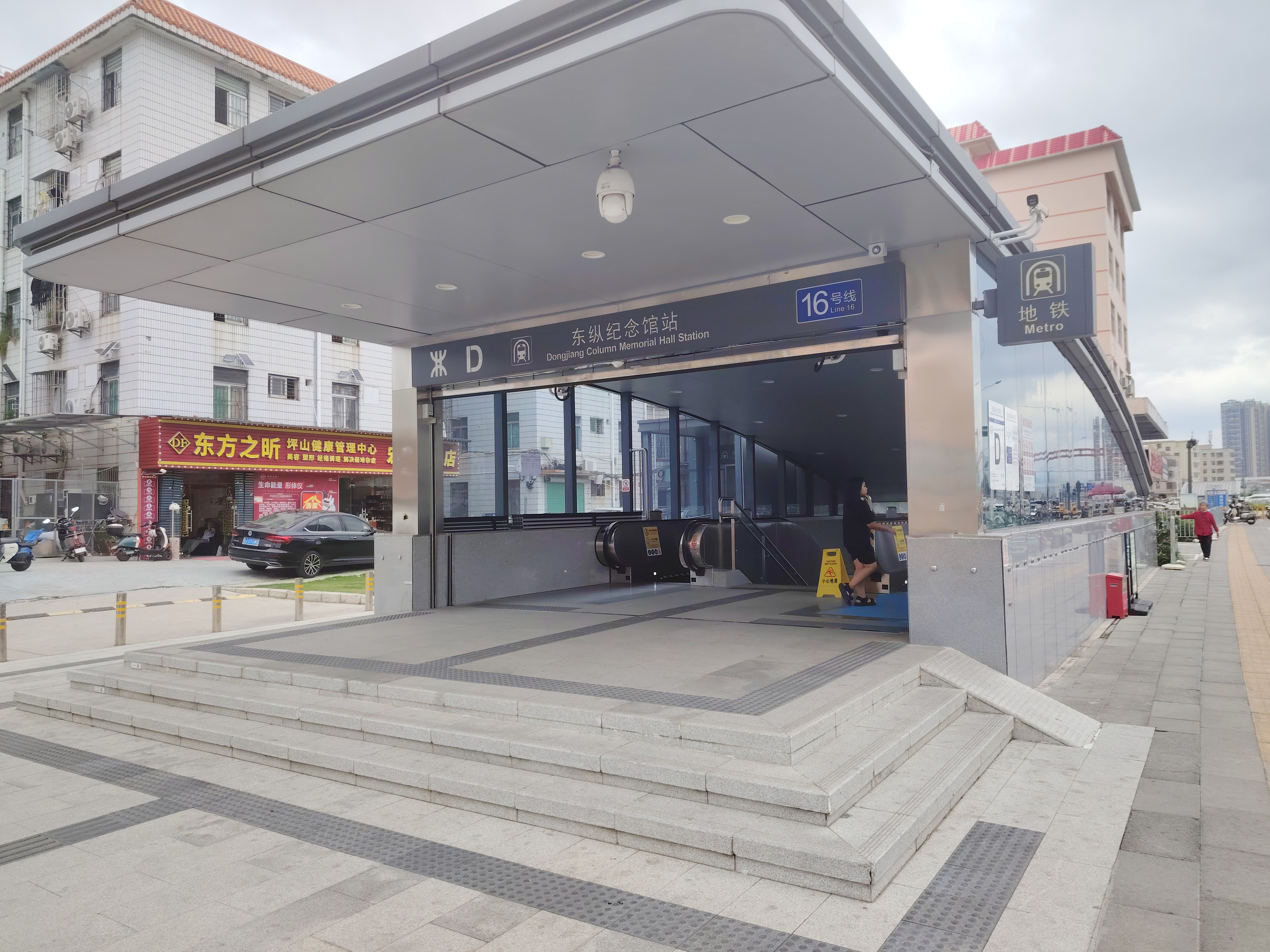
Entrance D

== Gallery ==
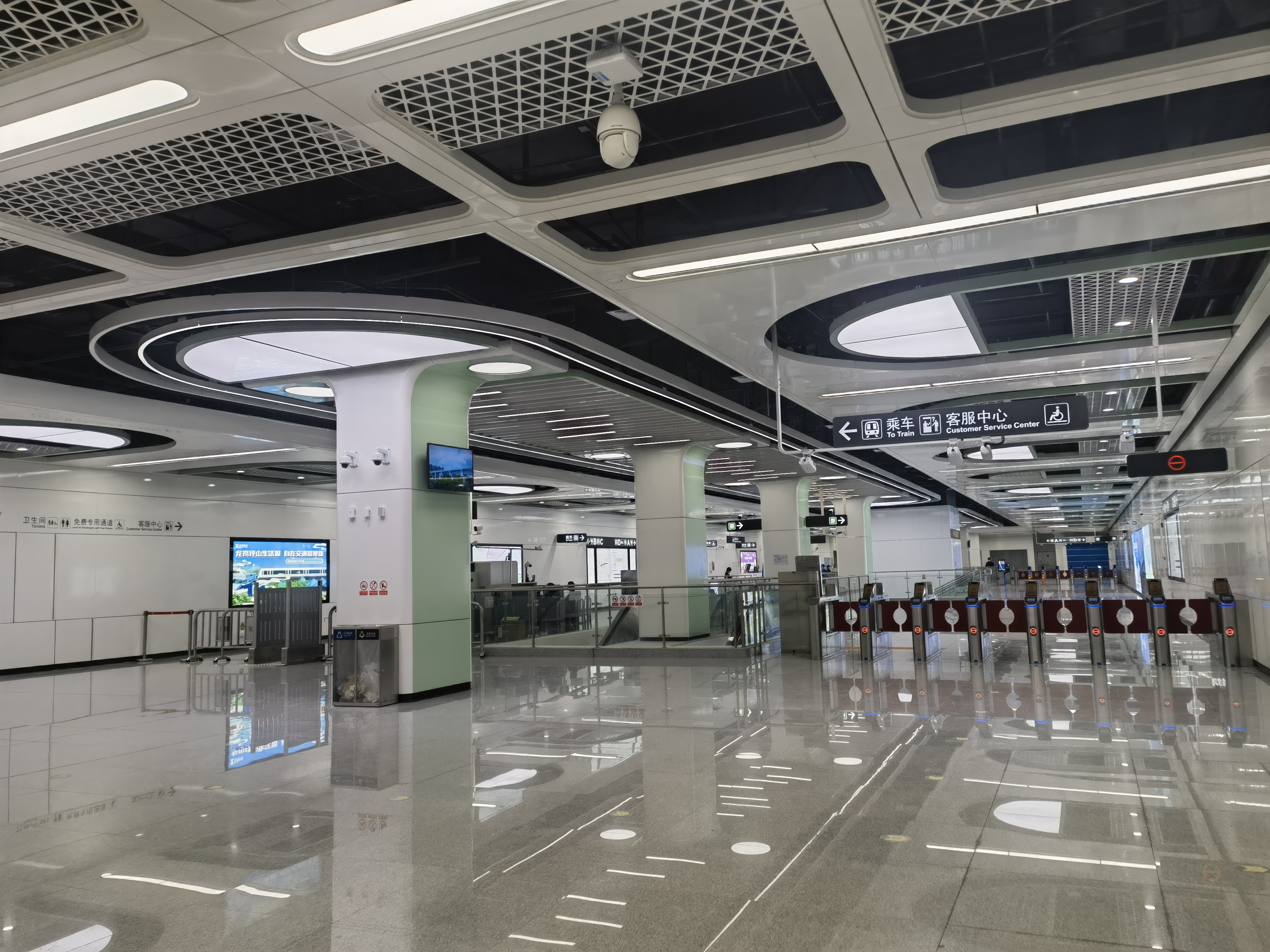
Concourse

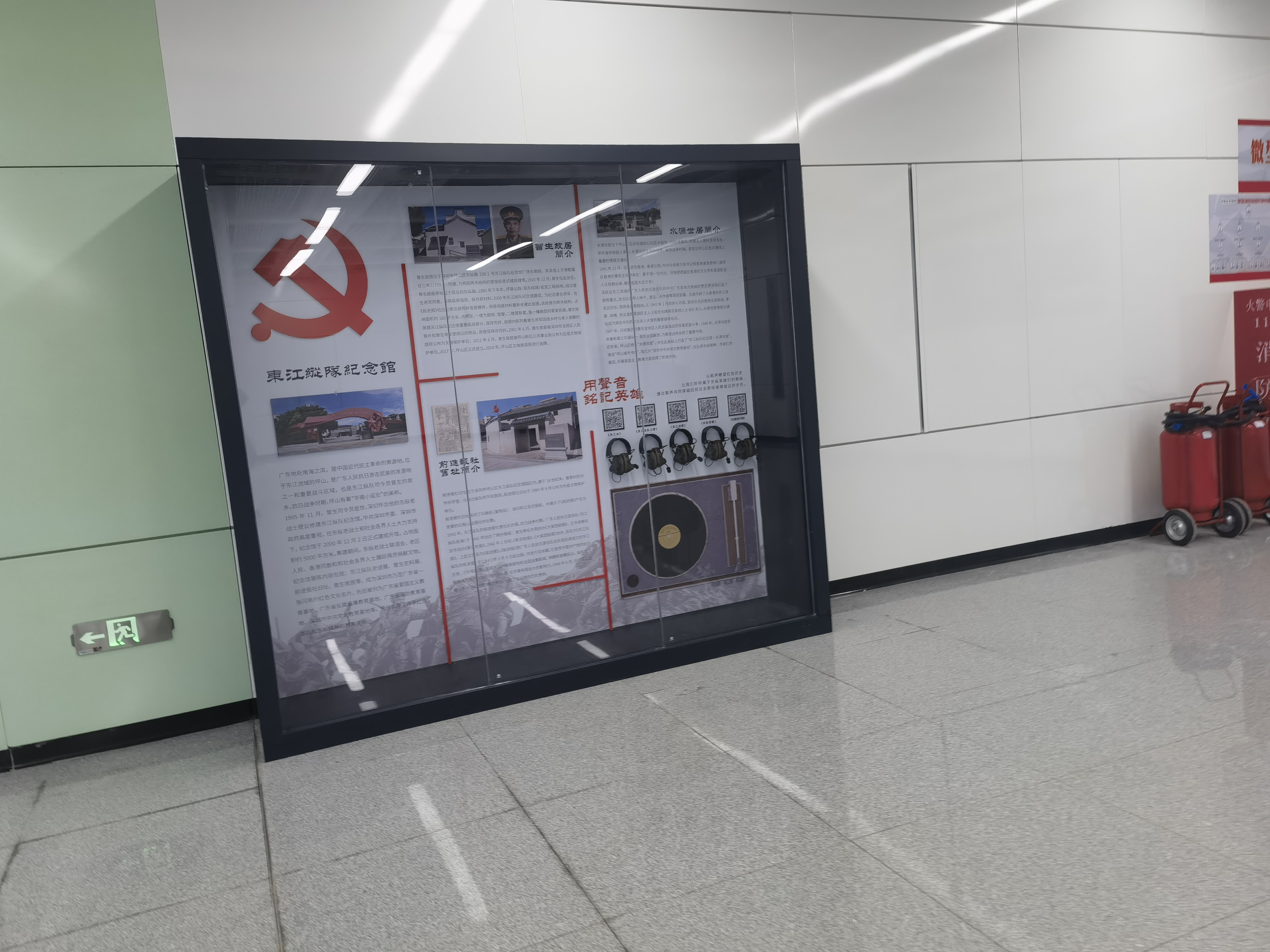
East River Column (the station's namesake) Introduction Panel

== Connections ==
The station is a short distance to Longbei station on Pingshan SkyShuttle Line 1, which was opened on the same day of this station's opening.

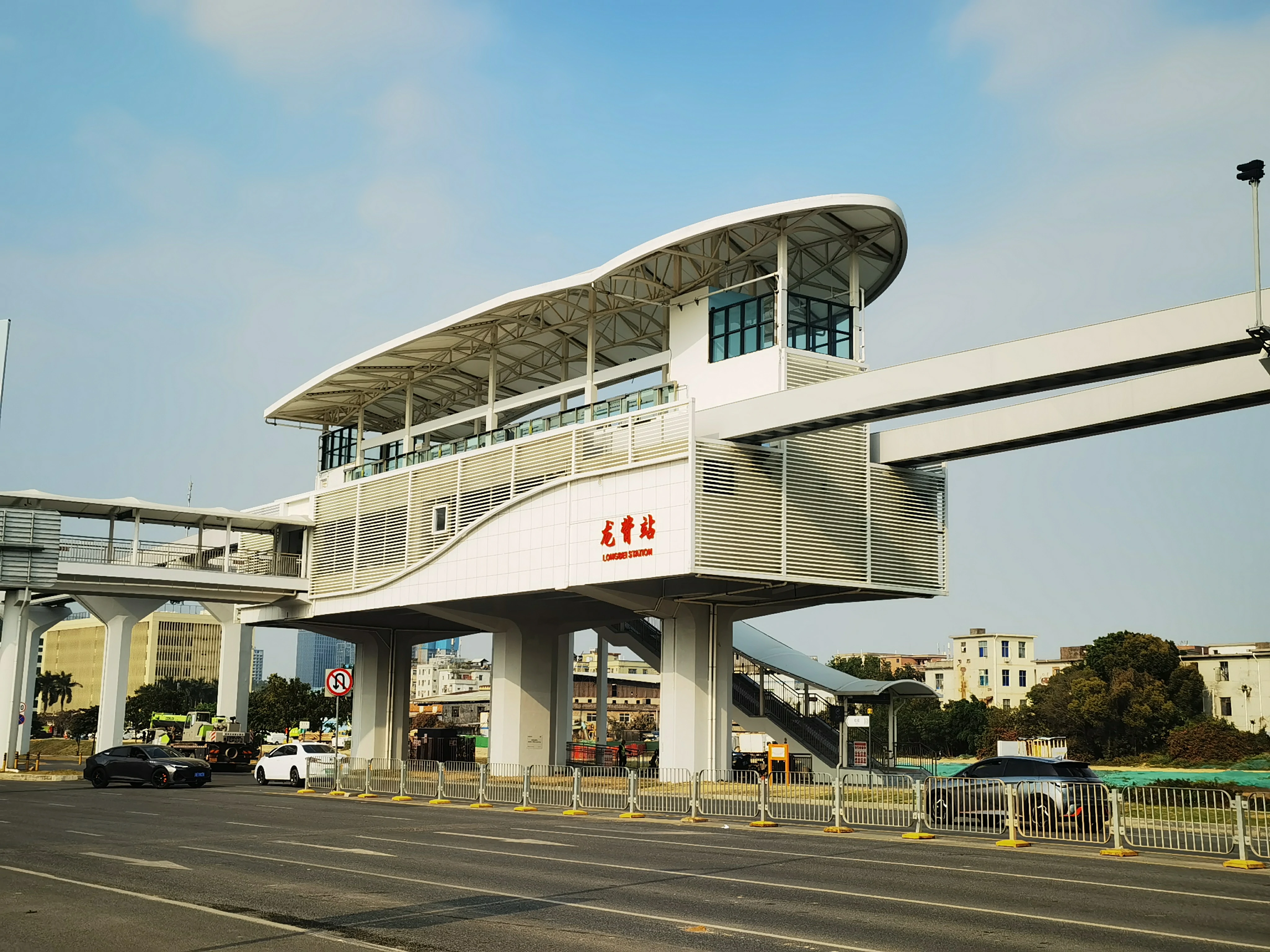
Longbei Station exterior

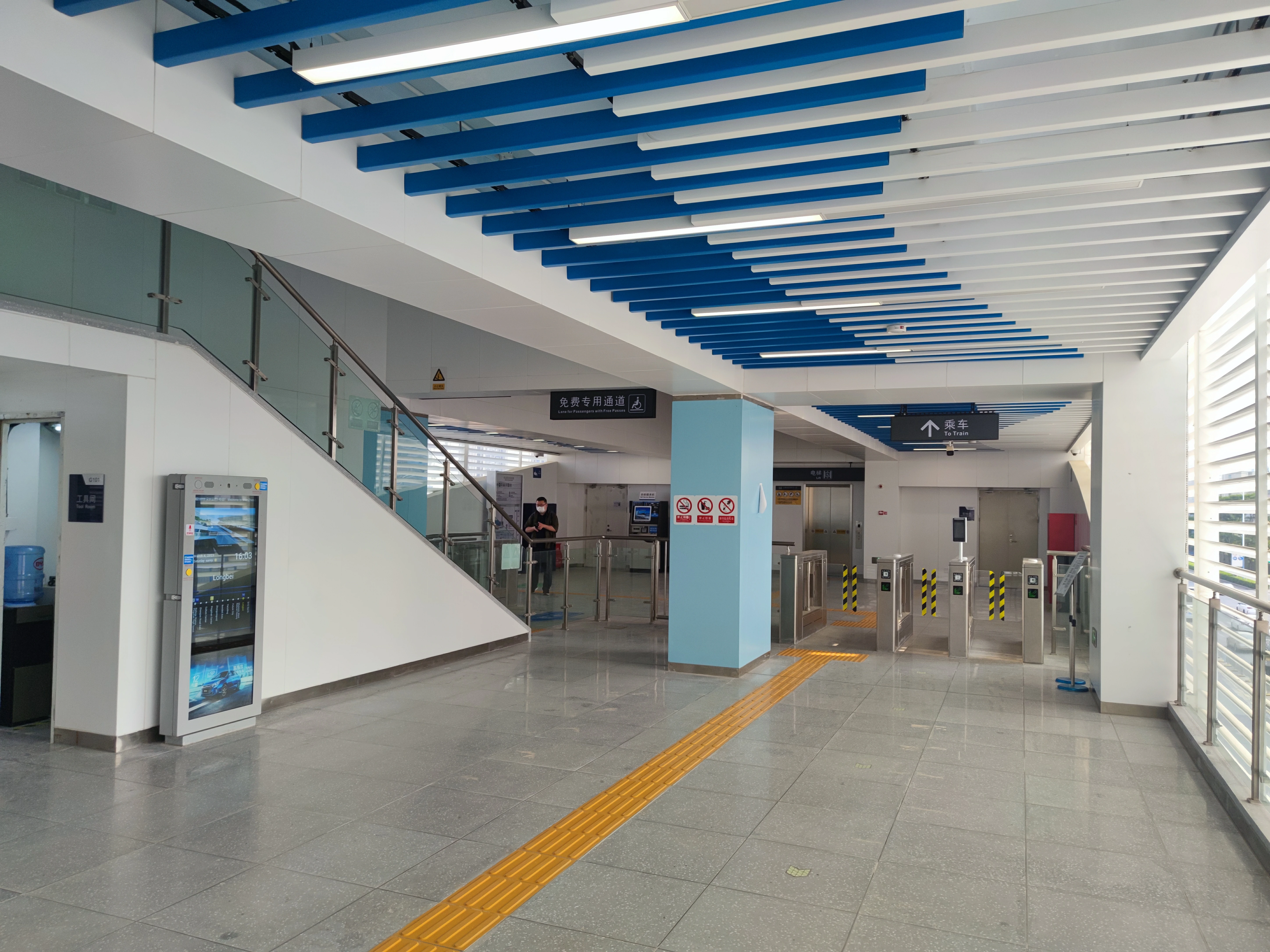
Longbei Station concourse

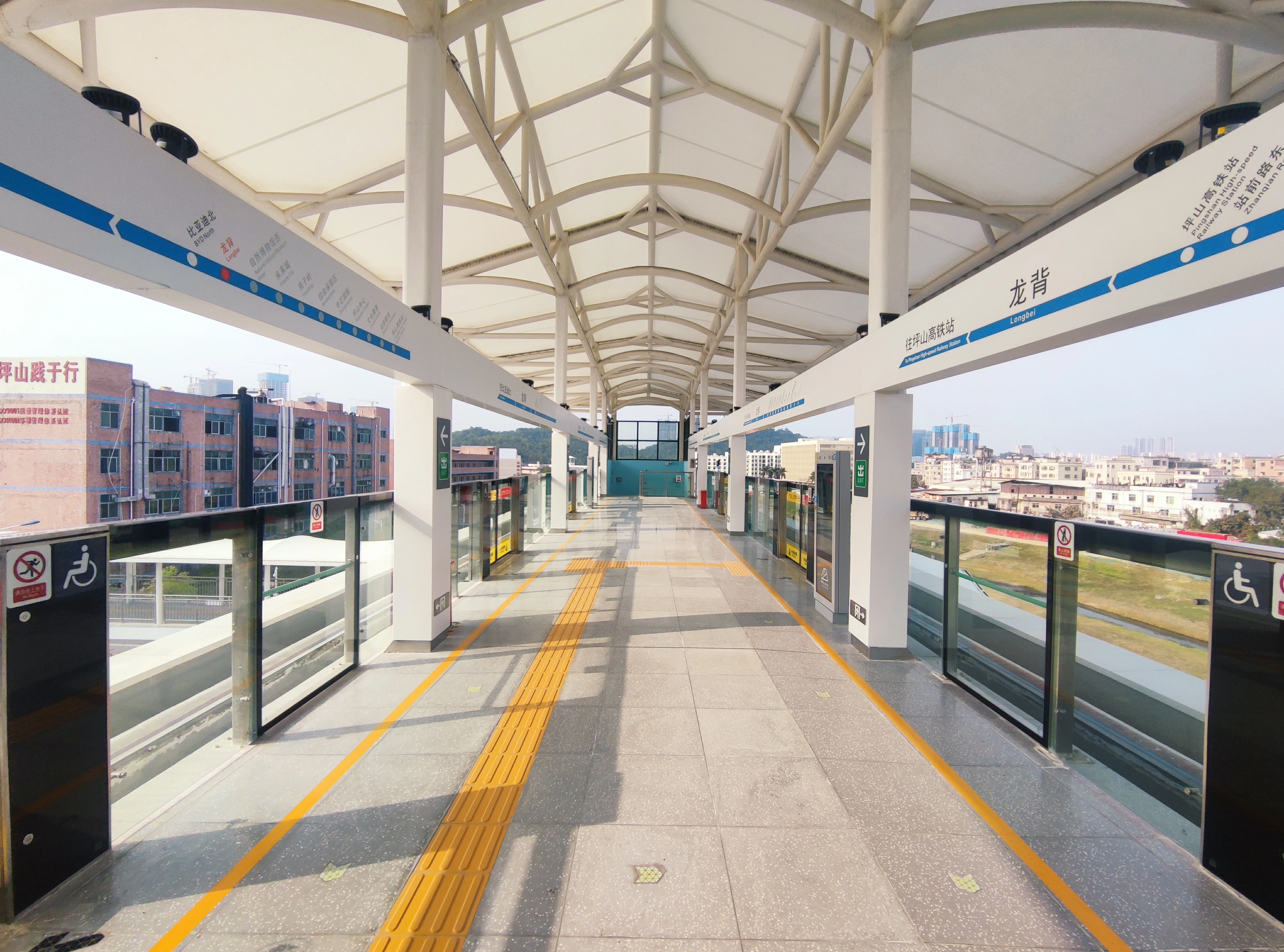
Longbei Station platform
