= Pinghuan station =

Shenzhen Metro Line 16 station

Pinghuan 坪环
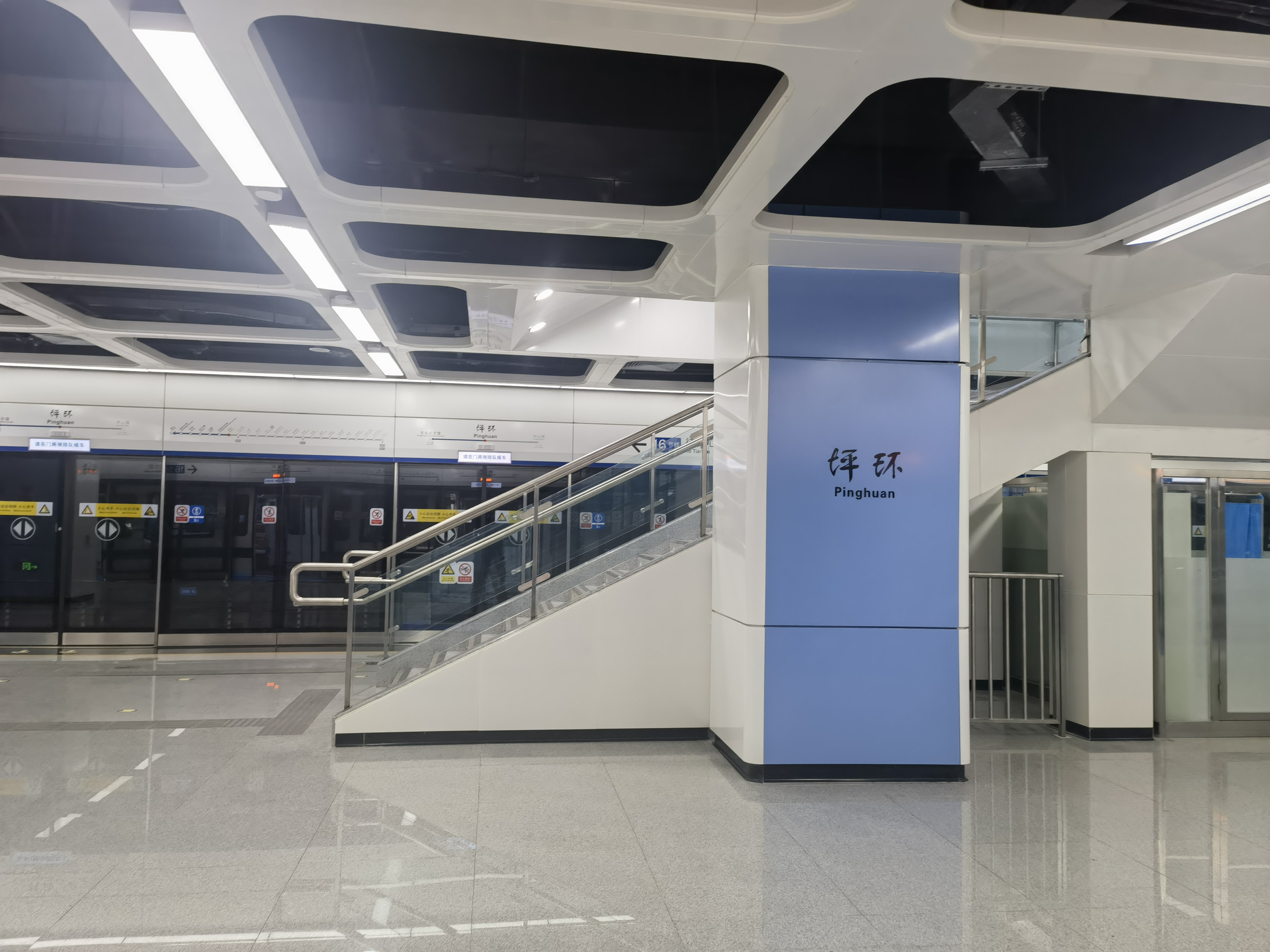
- Platform

Chinese name
- Traditional Chinese: 坪環
- Simplified Chinese: 坪环
Transcriptions
Standard Mandarin
- Hanyu Pinyin: Pínghuán
Yue: Cantonese
- Yale Romanization: Pìhngwàan
- Jyutping: Ping4 Waan4

General information
- Location: East of the intersection of Dongzong Road and Pingshan Zhongxing Road; Border of Maluan Subdistrict and Pingshan Subdistricts, Pingshan District, Shenzhen, Guangdong; China
- Coordinates: 22°41′15.79″N 114°20′30.91″E
- Operated by: SZMC (Shenzhen Metro Group)
- Line: Line 16
- Platforms: 2 (1 island platform)
- Tracks: 2

Construction
- Structure type: Underground
- Accessible: Yes

History
- Opened: 28 December 2022; 2 years ago

Services
Preceding station	Shenzhen Metro	Following station
Pingshanwei towards Yuanshan Xikeng	Line 16	Dongjiang Column Memorial Hall towards Tianxin
Location

Pinghuan station (simplified Chinese: 坪环; traditional Chinese: 坪環; pinyin: Pínghuán; Cantonese Yale: Pìhngwàan) is a station on Line 16 of Shenzhen Metro. It opened on 28 December 2022.

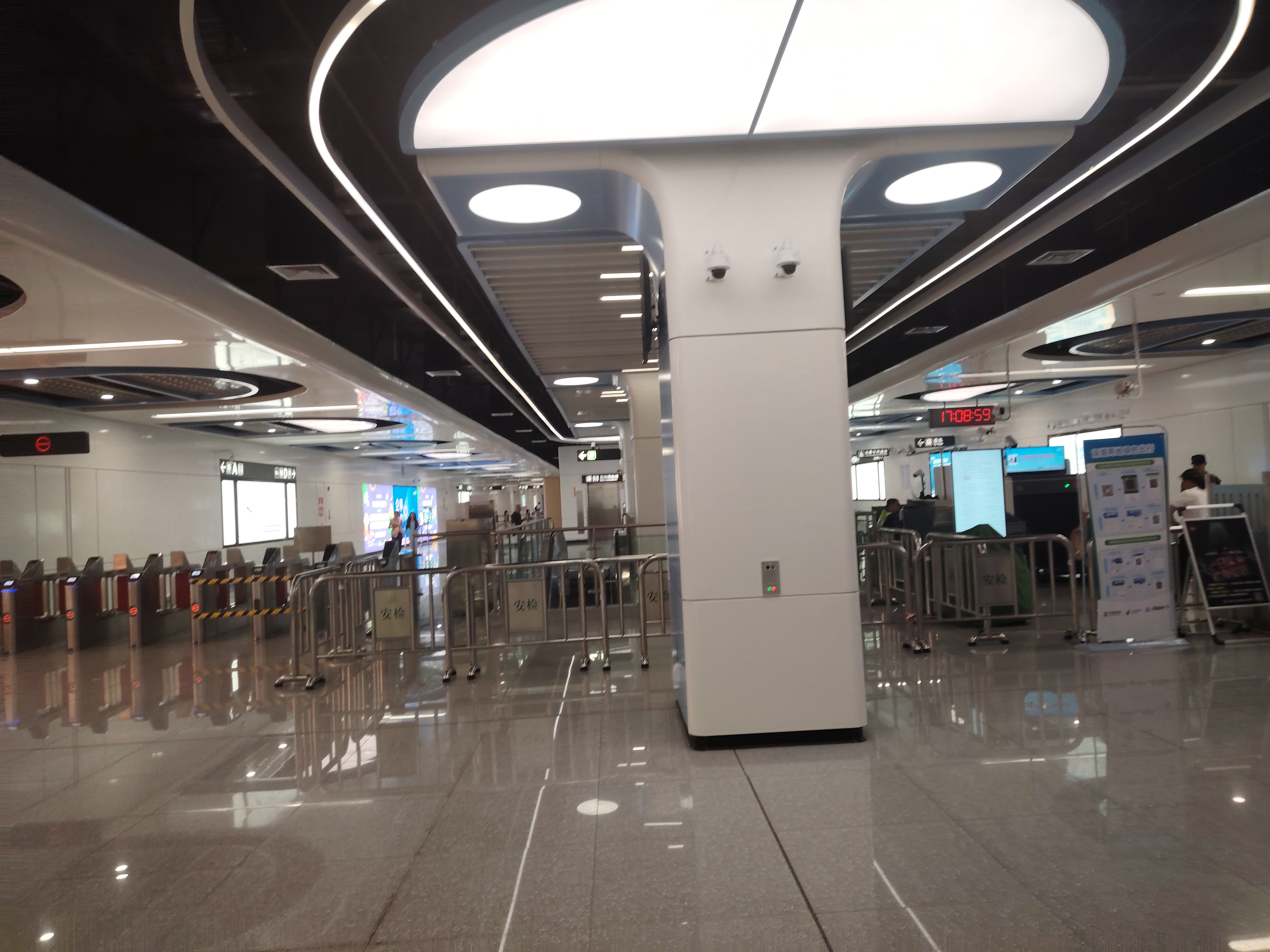
Concourse

== Station layout ==
The station has an island platform under Dongzong Road.

G	-	Exits A & D
B1F; Concourse	Lobby	Ticket Machines, Customer Service, Automatic Vending Machines
B2F; Platforms	Platform	16 towards Yuanshan Xikeng (Pingshanwei)
B2F; Platforms	Island platform, doors will open on the left
B2F; Platforms	Platform	16 towards Tianxin (Dongjiang Column Memorial Hall)

== Exits ==
Exit		Destination
Exit A	A1	Dongzong Road (S), Juntian 2nd Road, Pingshan Coach Terminal, Wanshun Garden, Dawan Shiju
Exit A	A2	Dongzong Road (N), Zhongxing East Community, Zhongxing West Community, Zhongxing Road, Pingshan Central Primary School
Exit D		Dongzong Road (N), Zhongxing East Community, Pingshan Middle School, Pinghuan Community Neighborhood Committee, Pingshan District Dongmen Primary School, Pingshan District 2nd Foreign Language Chinese School

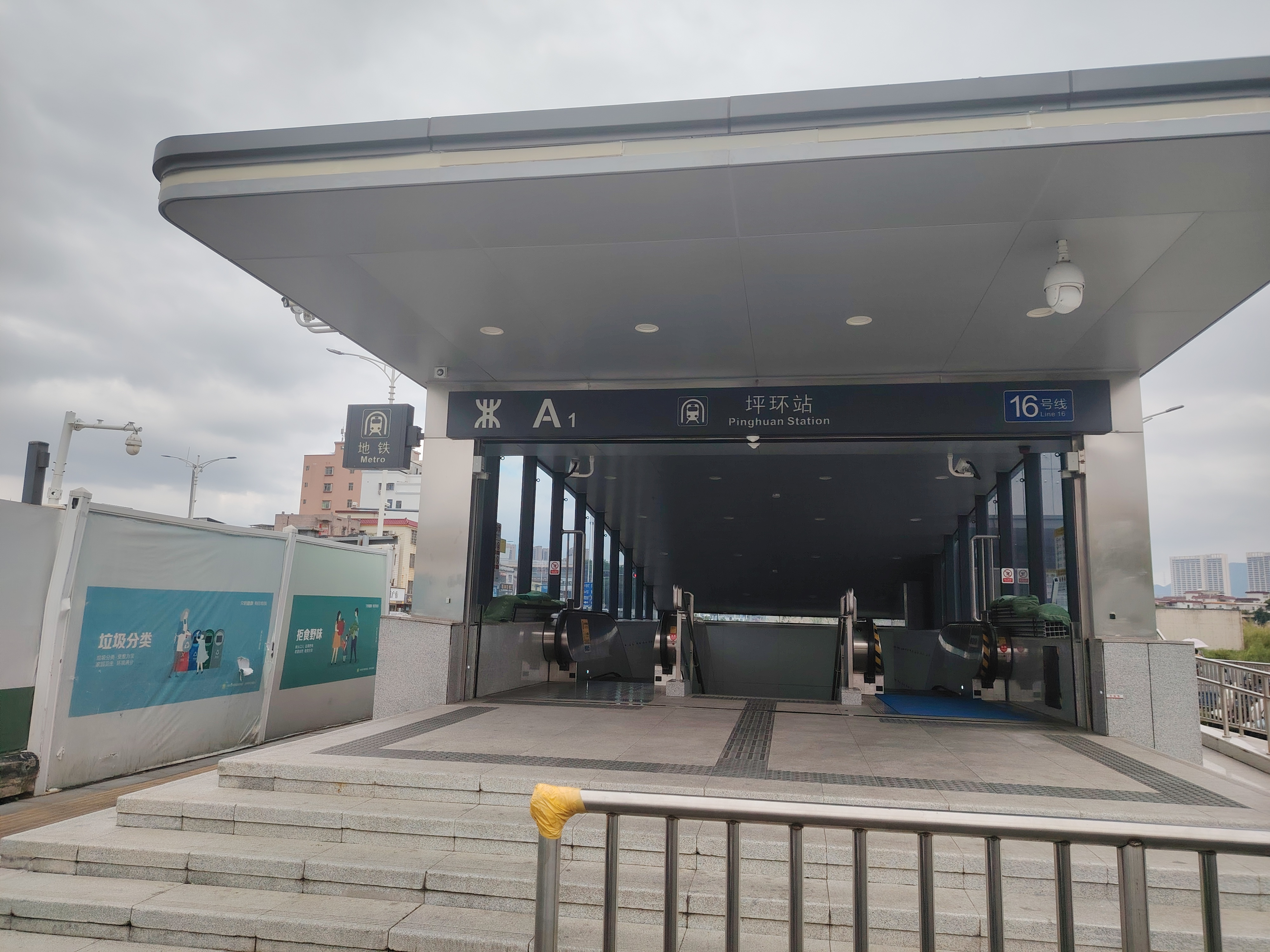
Entrance A1

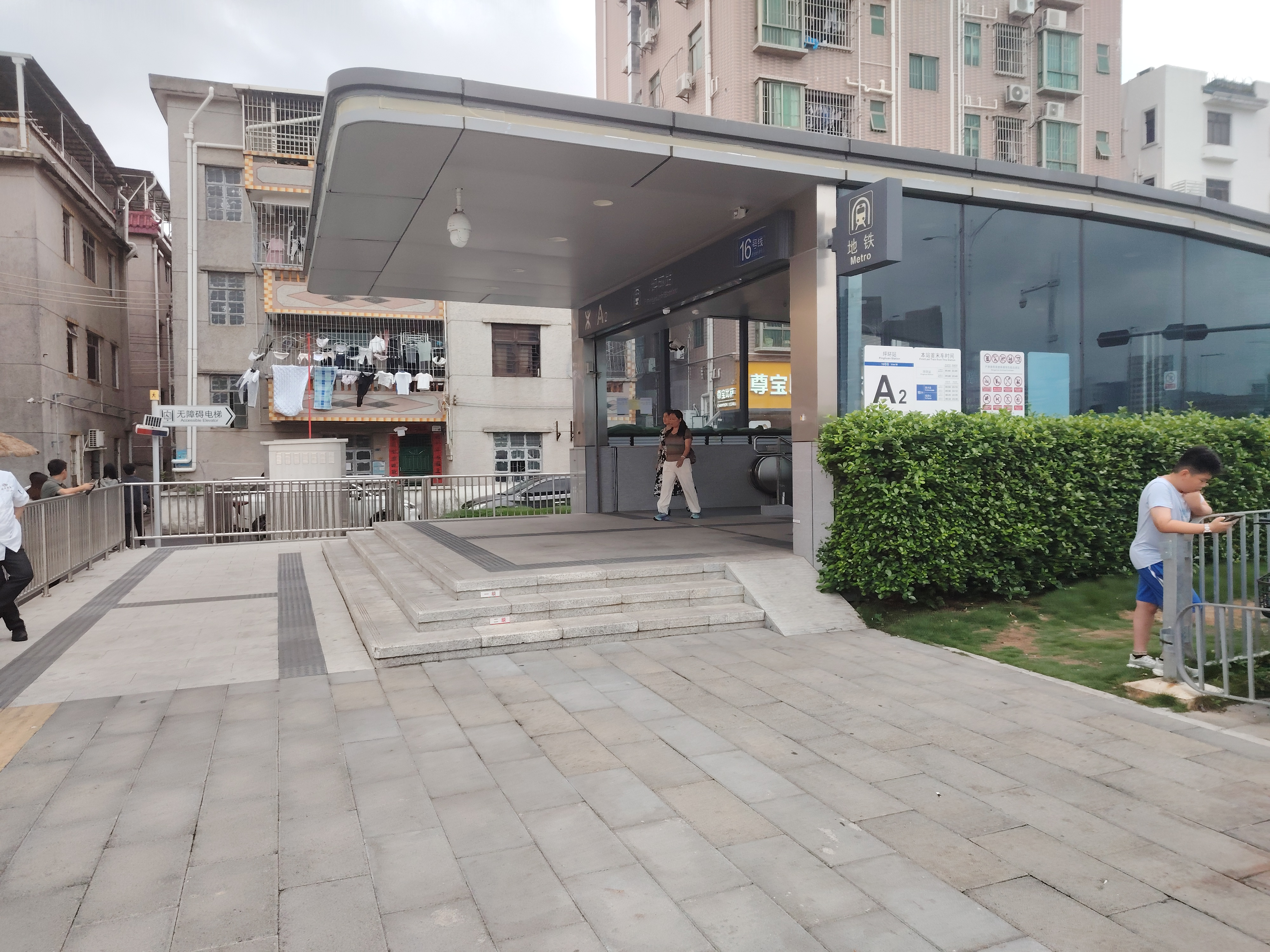
Entrance A2

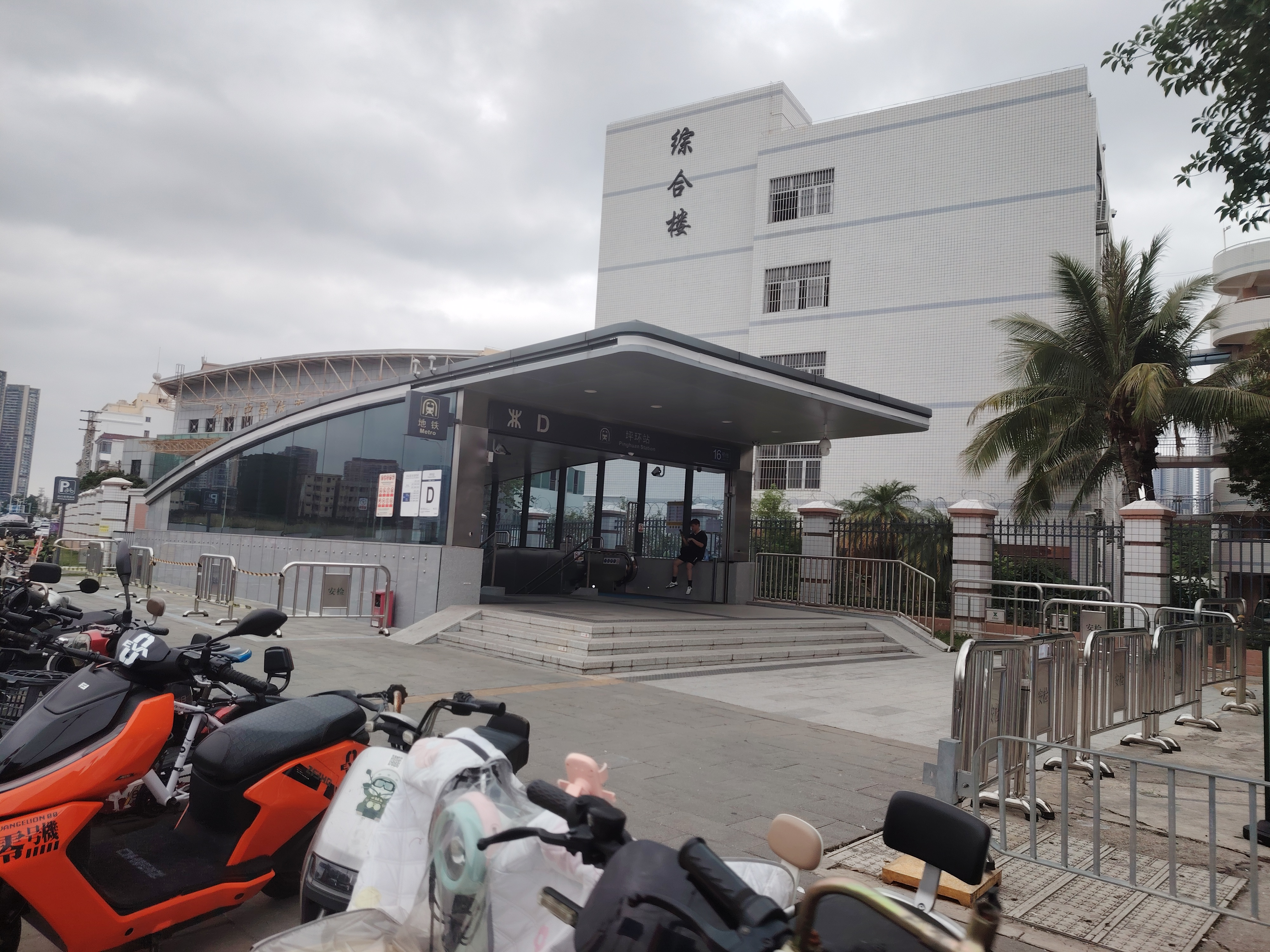
Entrance D
