= Shuanglong station (Shenzhen Metro) =

Metro station in Shenzhen, Guangdong, China

Shuanglong 双龙
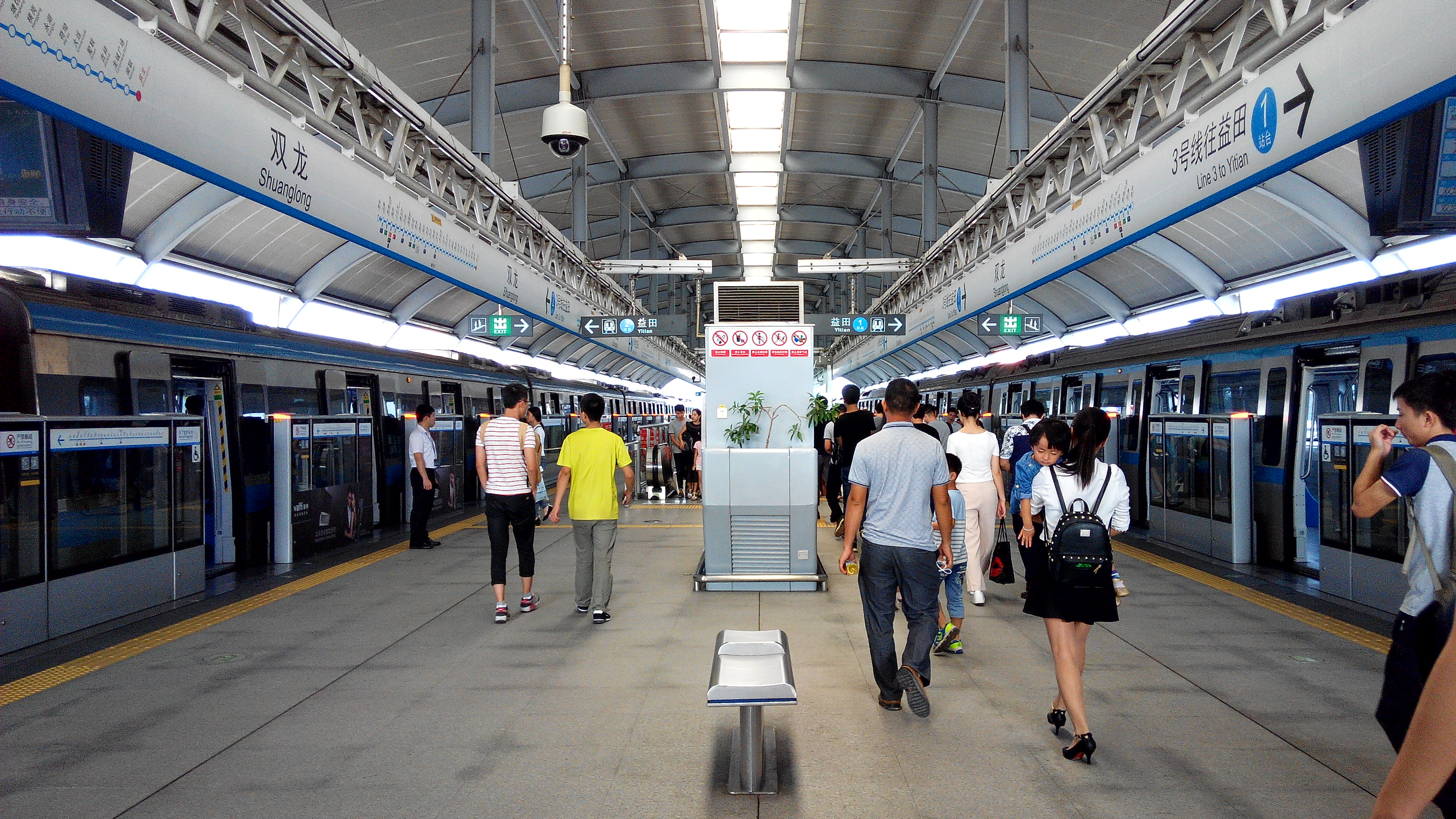
- Line 3 platform

General information
- Location: Longgang District, Shenzhen, Guangdong; China
- Coordinates: 22°43′54.466″N 114°16′21.155″E
- Operator: Shenzhen Metro Line 3 Operations
- Lines: Line 3; Line 16
- Platforms: 4 (2 island platforms)
- Tracks: 4

Construction
- Structure type: Elevated (Line 3); Underground (Line 16)
- Accessible: Yes

History
- Opened: Line 3: 28 December 2010 (15 years ago); Line 16: 28 December 2022 (3 years ago)

Services
Preceding station	Shenzhen Metro	Following station
Nanlian towards Futian Bonded Area	Line 3	Liyuan towards Pingdi Liulian
Longyuan towards Yuanshan Xikeng	Line 16	Xintangwei towards Tianxin
Track layout
Location

Shuanglong station (Chinese: 双龙站; pinyin: Shuānglóng Zhàn) is an interchange station for Line 3 and Line 16 of the Shenzhen Metro. Line 3 station is elevated, above Shenhui Road. Line 3 platform opened on 28 December 2010 and Line 16 platform opened on 28 December 2022.

== Station layout ==
3F; 3 Platforms	Platform	3 towards Futian Bonded Area (Nanlian)
3F; 3 Platforms	Island platform, doors will open on the left
3F; 3 Platforms	Platform	3 towards Pingdi Liulian (Liyuan)
2F; Concourse	Lobby of Line 3	Customer service, shops, vending machines, ATMs; Transfer passage between Line 3 and Line 16
G	Lobby of Line 16	Exit, customer service, shops, vending machines, ATMs; Transfer passage between Line 3 and Line 16
B1F; 16 Platforms	Platform	16 towards Yuanshan Xikeng (Longyuan)
B1F; 16 Platforms	Island platform, doors will open on the left
B1F; 16 Platforms	Platform	16 towards Tianxin (Xintangwei)

== Exits ==
Exit	Destination
Exit A	Shenhui Road (S), Longgang Boulevard (S), Huaxi Street, Shuanglong Rainbow Department Store
Exit B	Shenhui Road (S), Longgang Boulevard (S), Zhonghe Street, Yiwu Commodities Wholesale Market
Exit C	Shenhui Road (N), Longgang Boulevard (N), Longping Road, Jiyin Leather Plaza
Exit D	Shenhui Road (N), Longgang Boulevard (N), Walmart, Renren Shopping Plaza, Longgang Old Street, Fujia Street, Sanyu Hotel

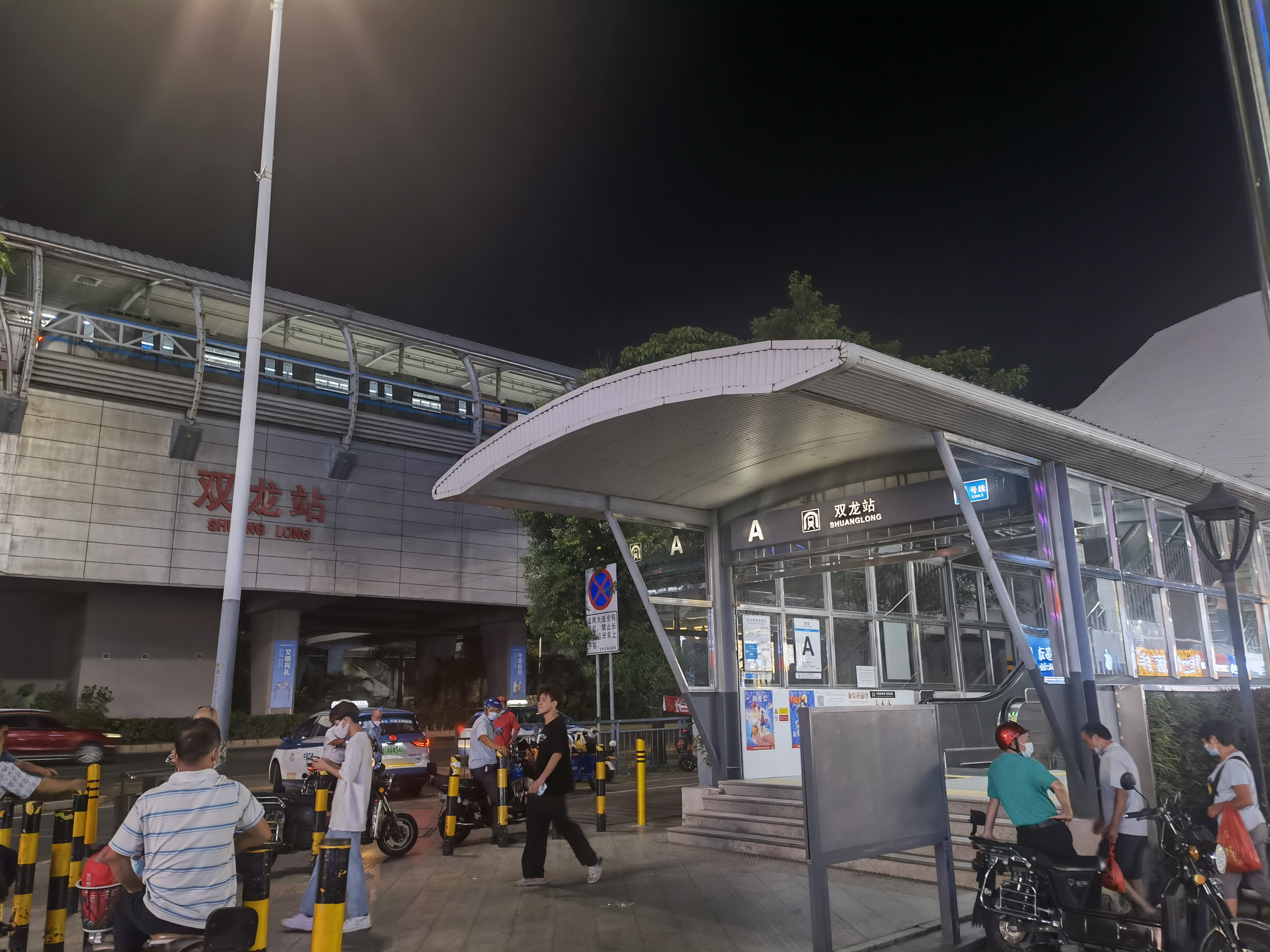
Entrance A

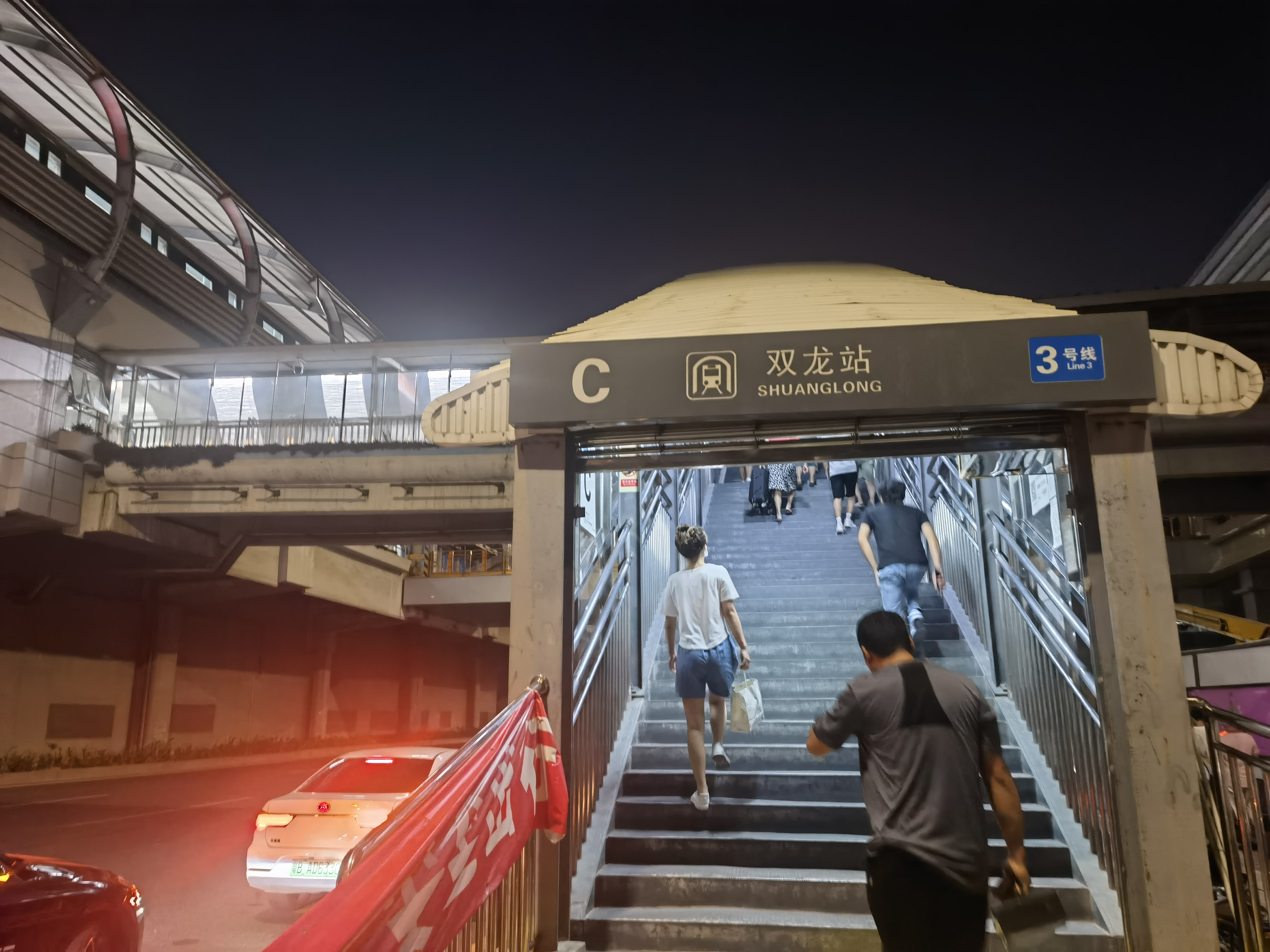
Entrance C

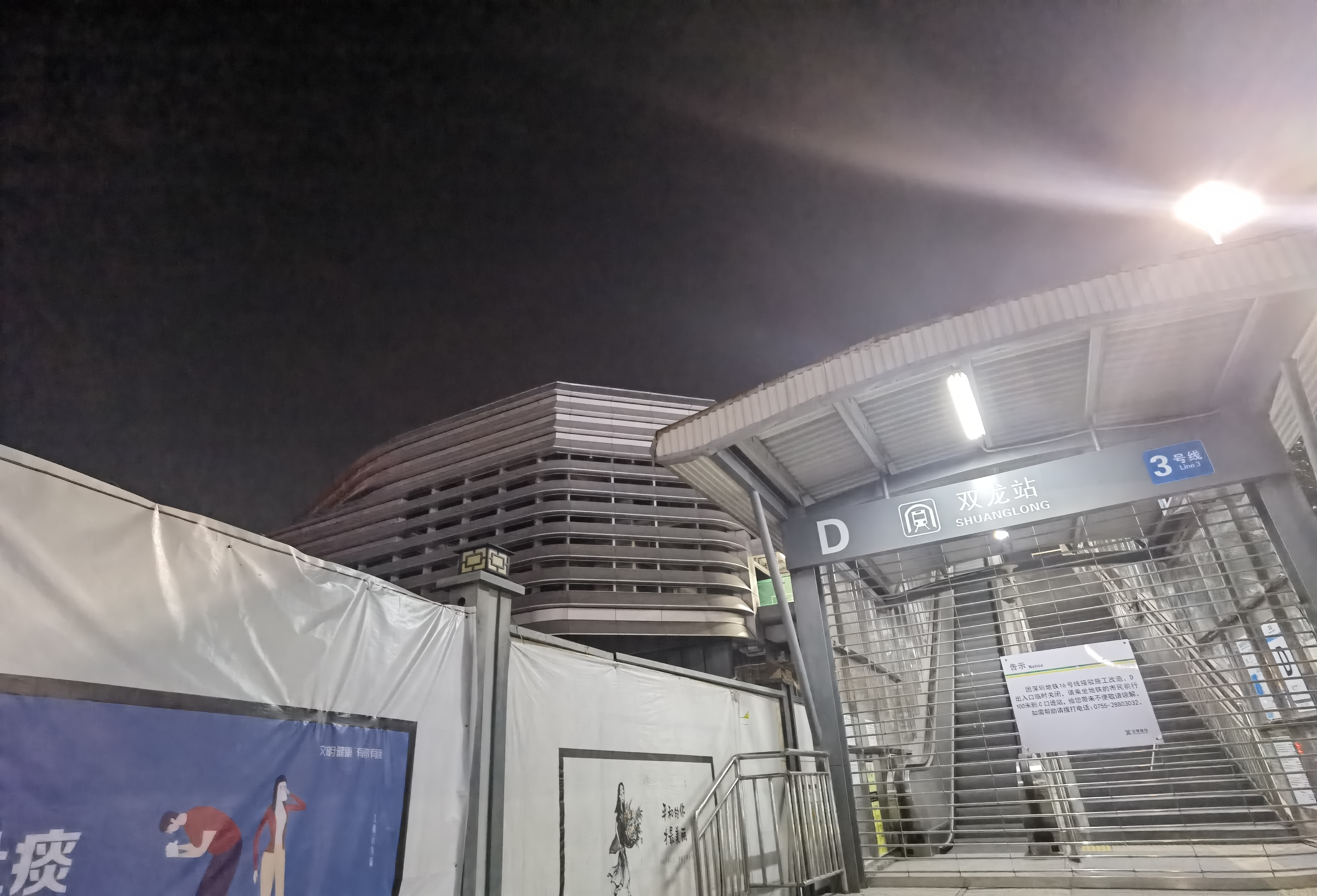
Entrance D

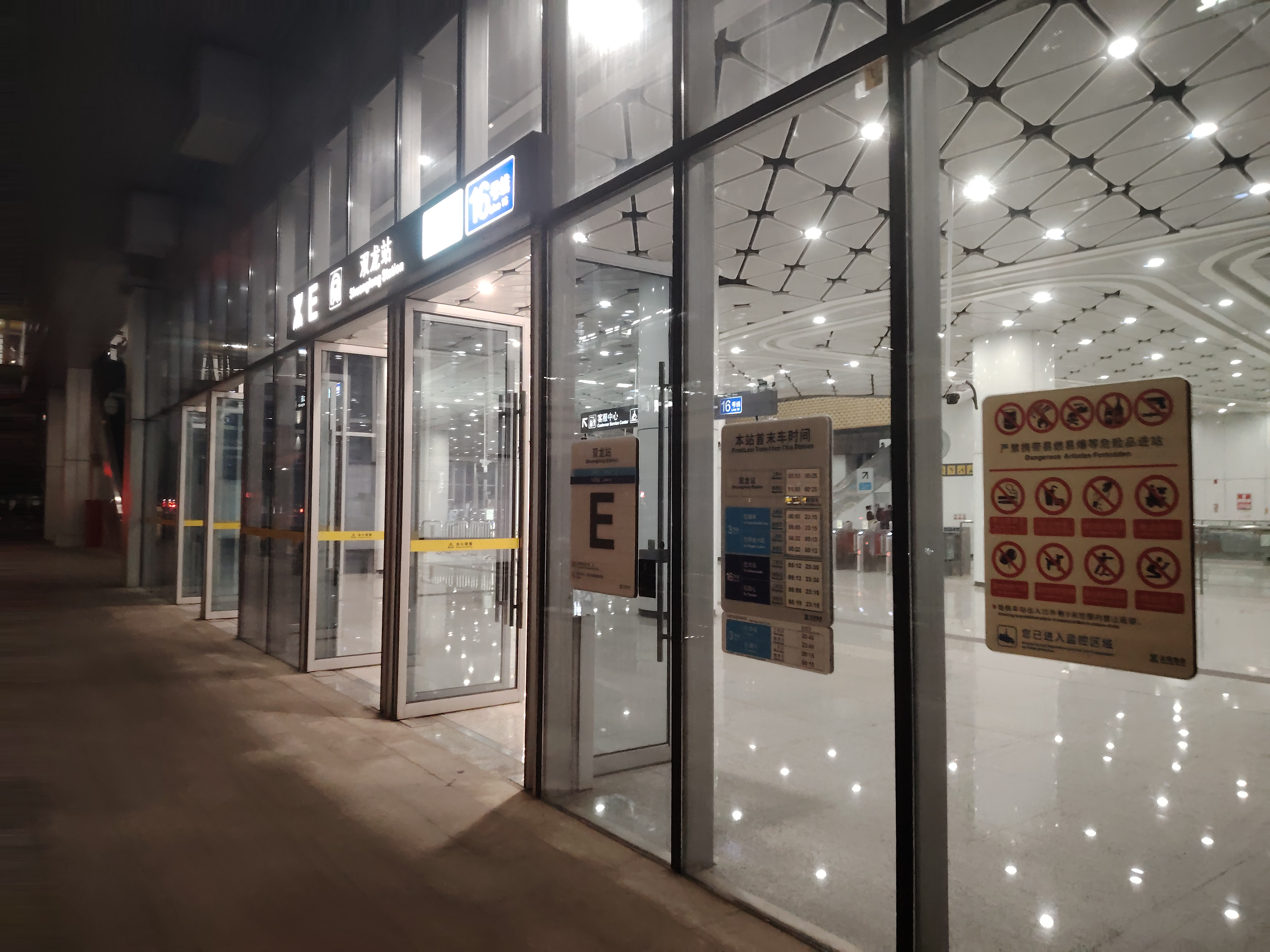
Entrance E

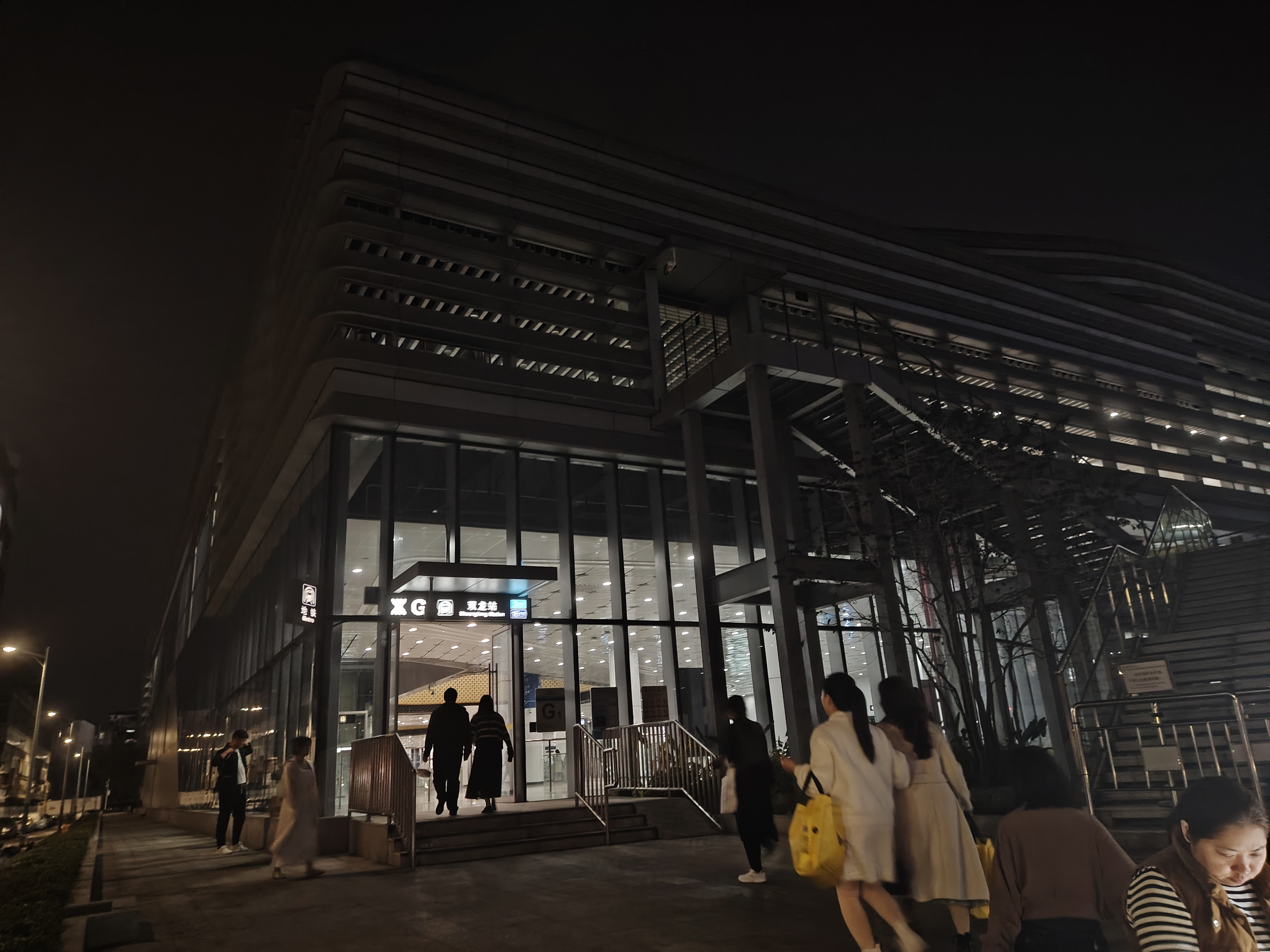
Entrance G2

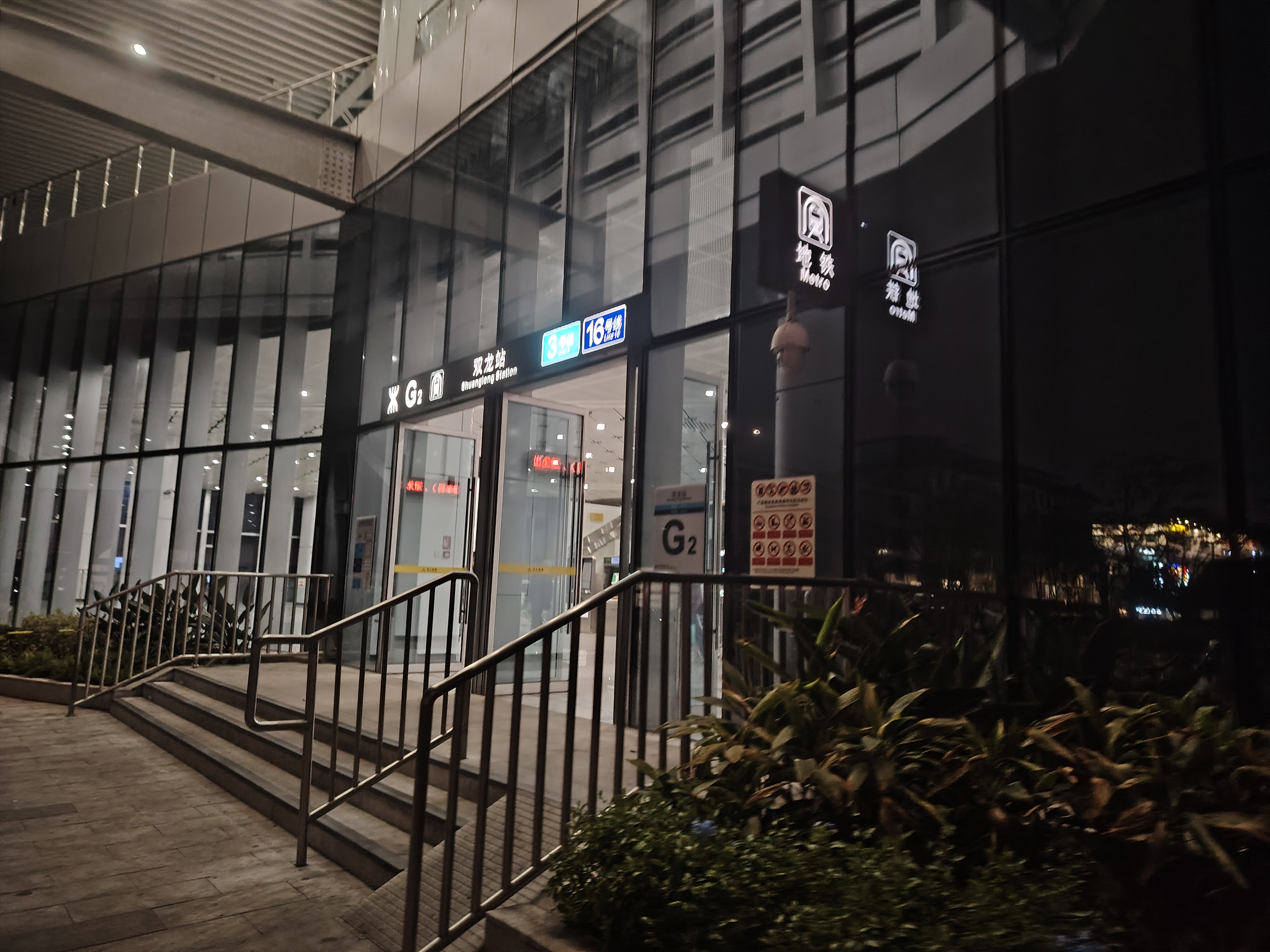
Entrance G2

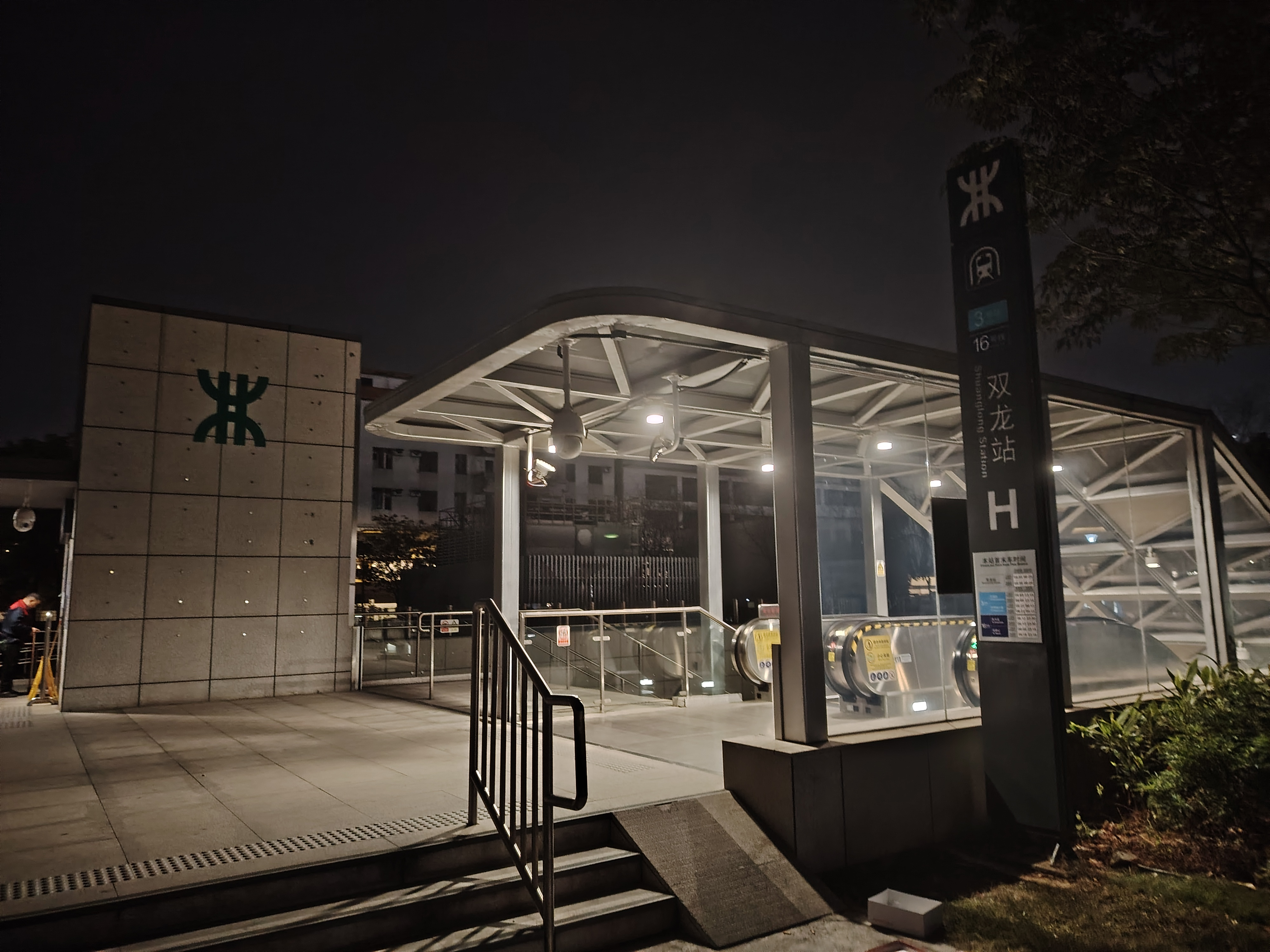
Entrance H

== Gallery ==
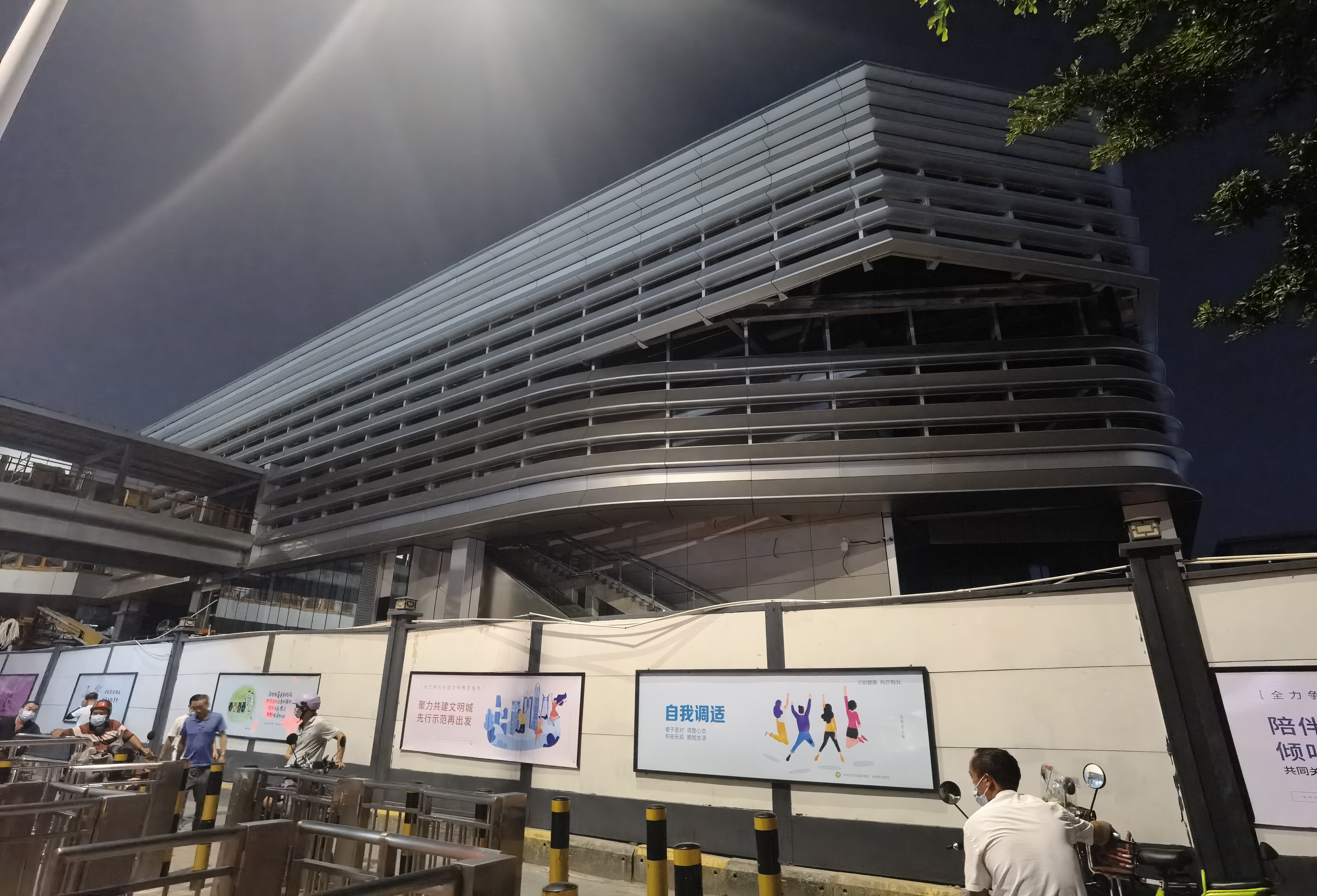
Line 16 construction site

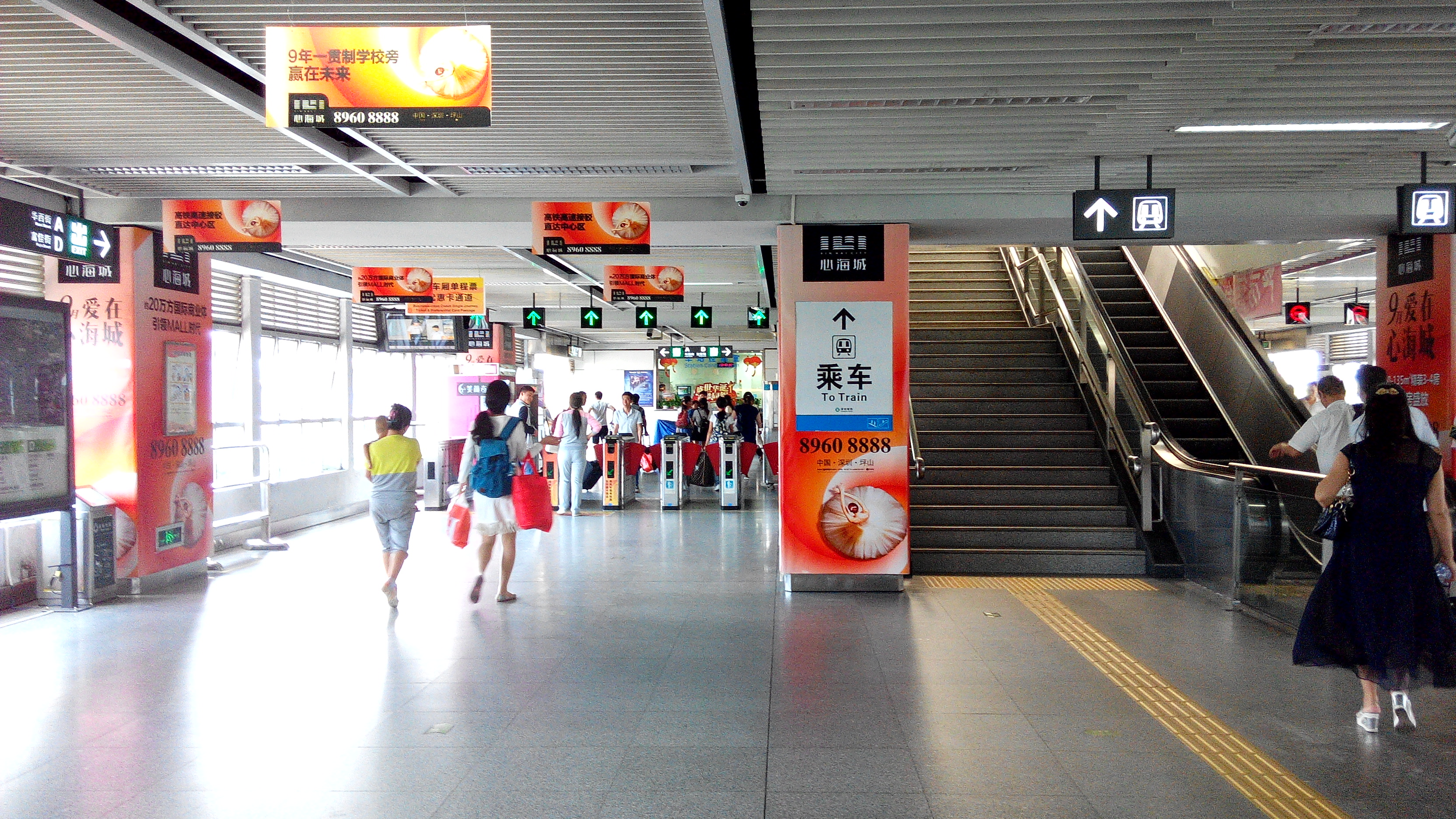
Line 3 concourse

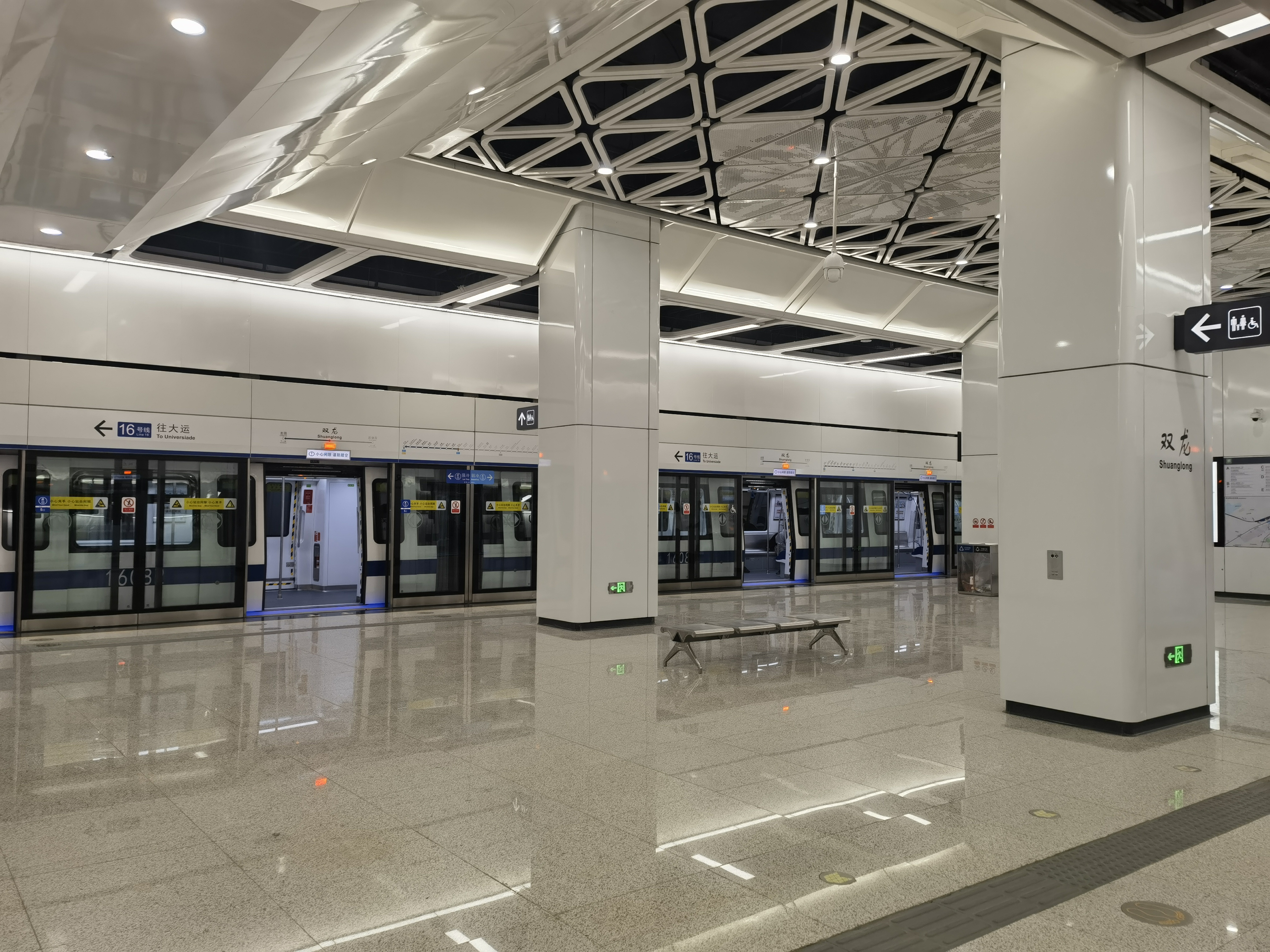
Line 16 platform

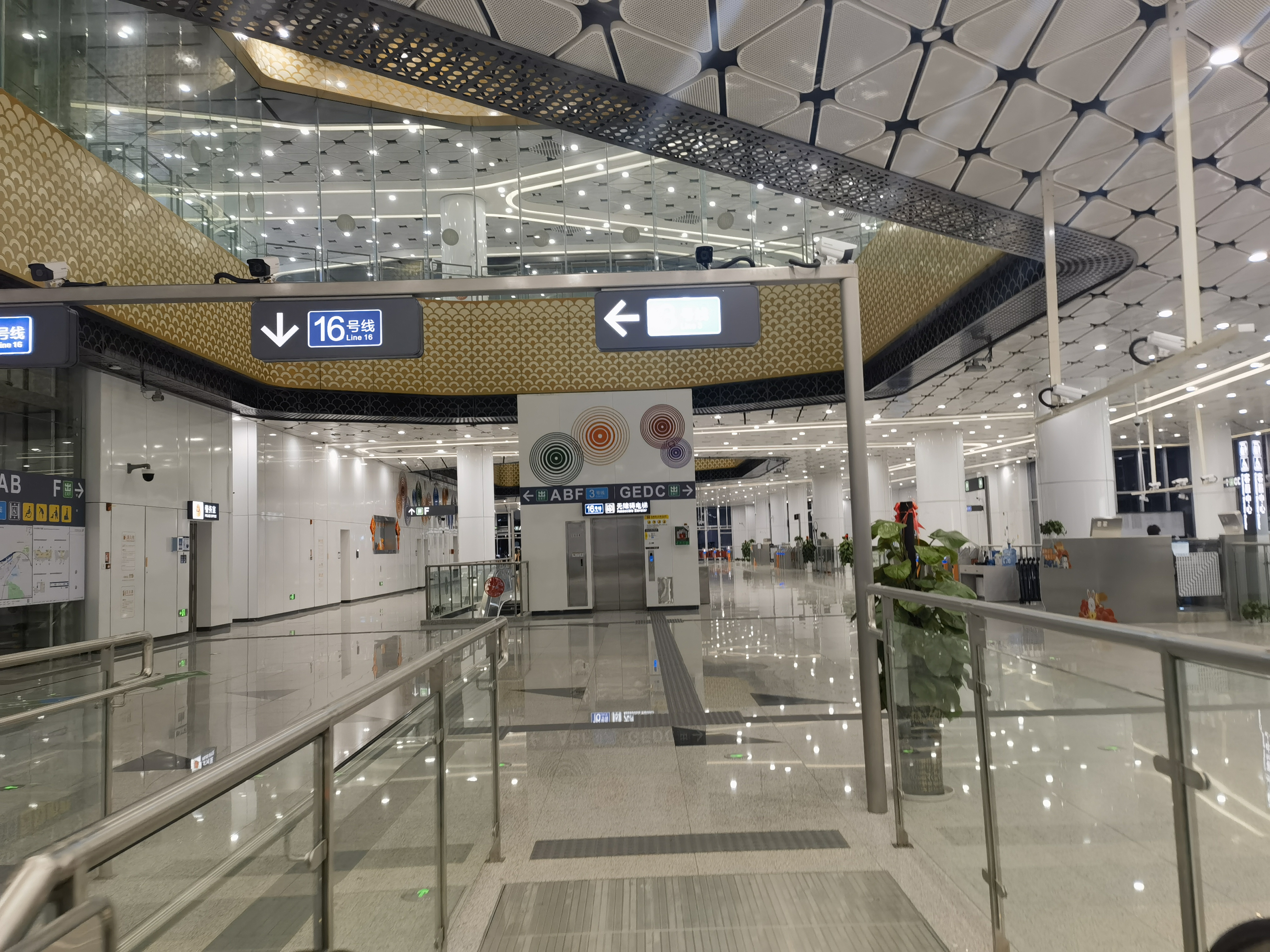
Line 16 concourse

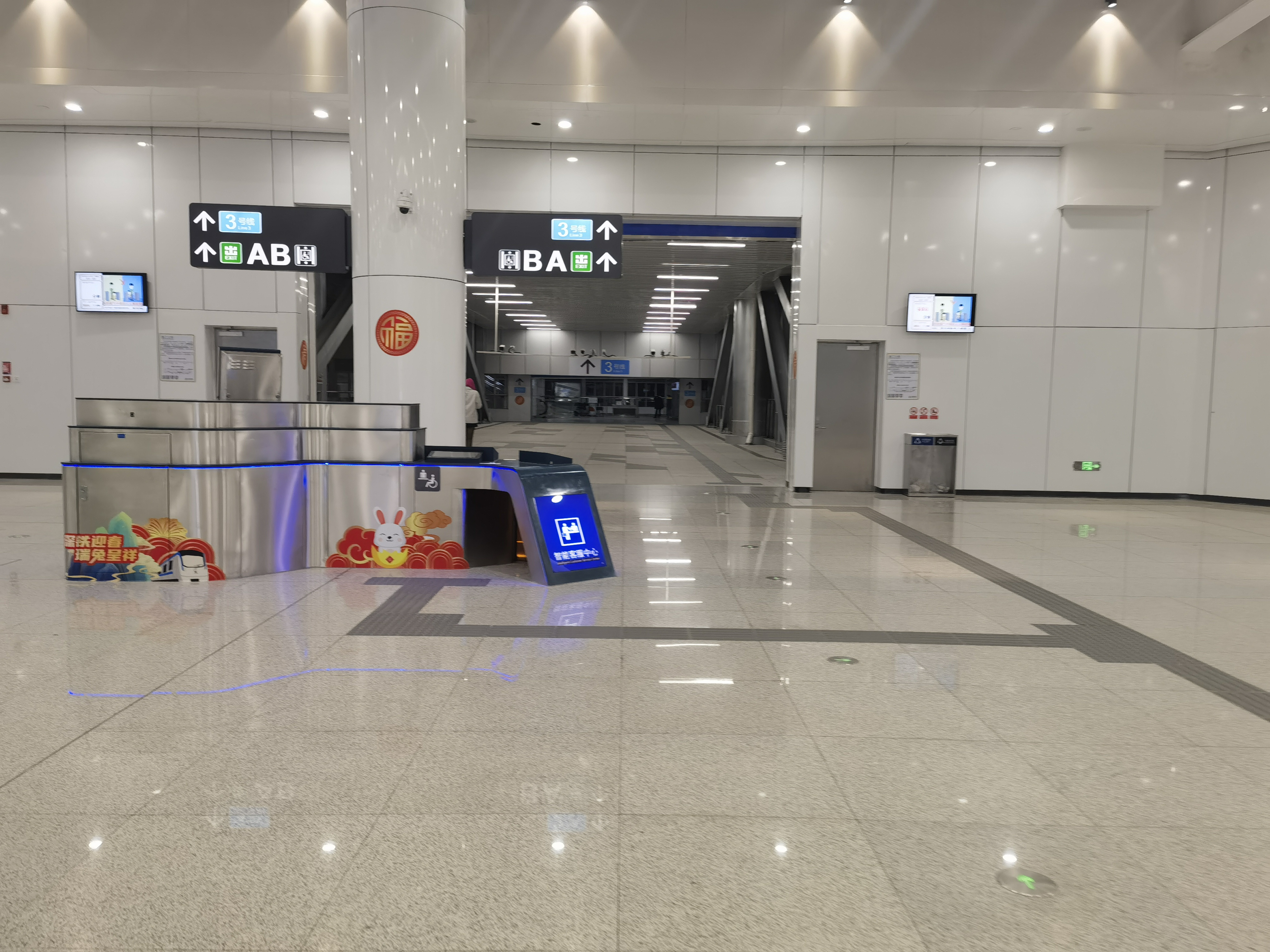
Transfer passage
