= Baishitang station =

Shenzhen Metro Line 3 station

Baishitang 白石塘
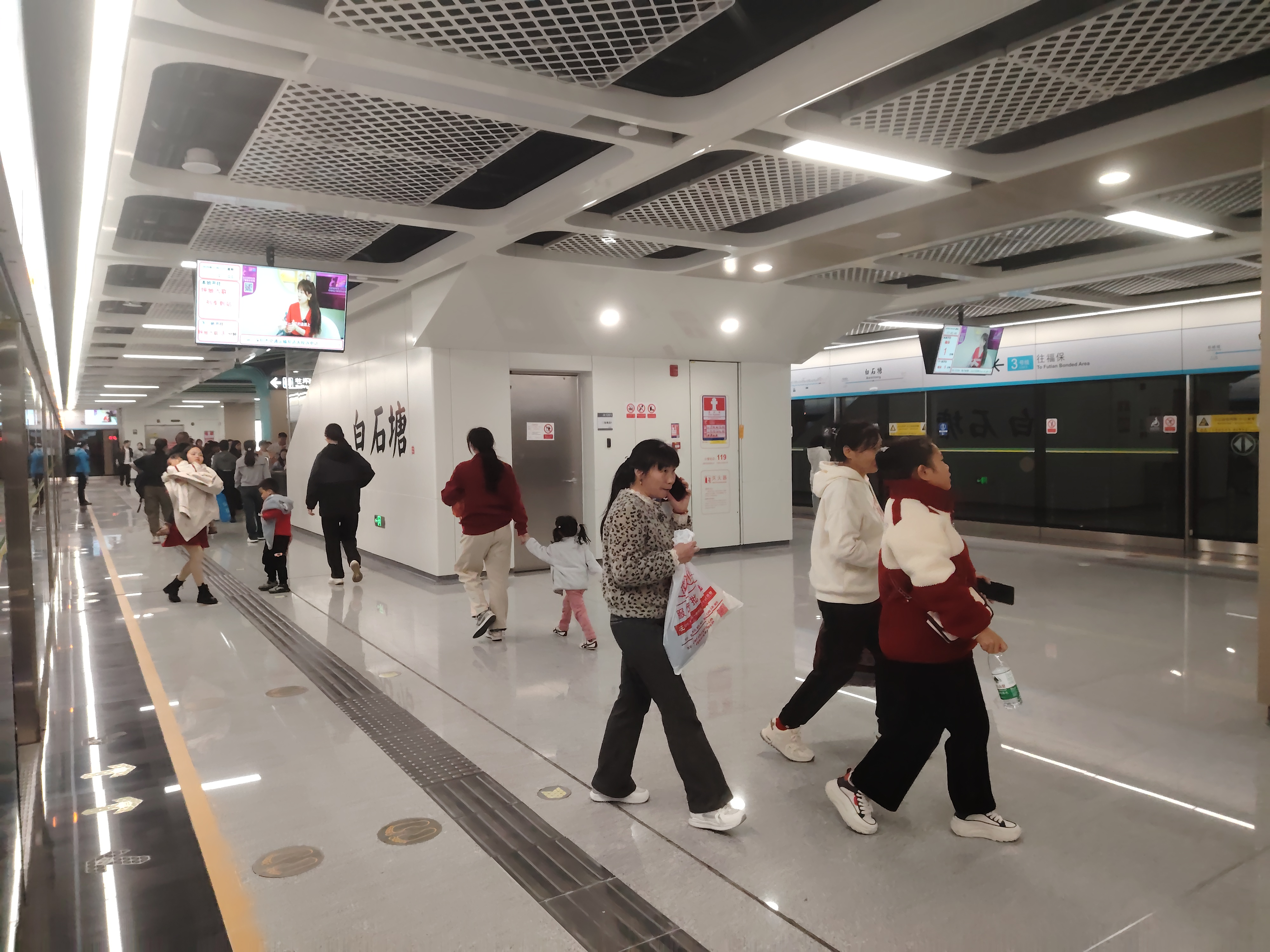
- Platform

Chinese name
- Chinese: 白石塘
Transcriptions
Standard Mandarin
- Hanyu Pinyin: Báishítáng
Yue: Cantonese
- Yale Romanization: Baahksehktòng
- Jyutping: Baak6sek6tong4

General information
- Location: Intersection of Jixiang Road (吉祥路) and Fuzhao Street (福照街); Pingdi Subdistrict, Longgang District, Shenzhen, Guangdong; China
- Coordinates: 22°46′26.324″N 114°17′5.651″E
- Operated by: SZMC (Shenzhen Metro Group)
- Line: Line 3
- Platforms: 2 (1 island platform)
- Tracks: 2

Construction
- Structure type: Underground
- Accessible: Yes

History
- Opened: 28 December 2024 (17 months ago)

Services
Preceding station	Shenzhen Metro	Following station
Low Carbon City towards Futian Bonded Area	Line 3	Fuping towards Pingdi Liulian
Location

Baishitang station (Chinese: 白石塘站; pinyin: Báishítáng Zhàn; Jyutping: Baak6sek6tong4 Zaam6; Cantonese Yale: Baahksehktòng Jaahm) is a station on Line 3 of Shenzhen Metro. It opened on 28 December 2024, and is located underground in Pingdi Subdistrict in Longgang District.

The station is part of the fourth phase of Line 3 (East Extension).

== Station layout ==
G	-	Exits A-D
B1F; Concourse	Lobby	Ticket Machines, Customer Service, Shops, Vending Machines
B2F; Platforms	Platform	3 towards Futian Bonded Area (Low Carbon City)
B2F; Platforms	Island platform, doors will open on the left
B2F; Platforms	Platform	3 towards Pingdi Liulian (Fuping)

=== Entrances/exits ===
The station has 4 points of entry/exit, with Exits A and C being accessible via elevators. Exit B has a toilet.

- A: Jixiang Road, Fuzhao Street
- B: Zhenxing Road, Pingdi Park
- C: Zhenxing Road
- D: Xiangji Road
