= Nanlian station =

Metro station in Shenzhen, China

Nanlian 南联
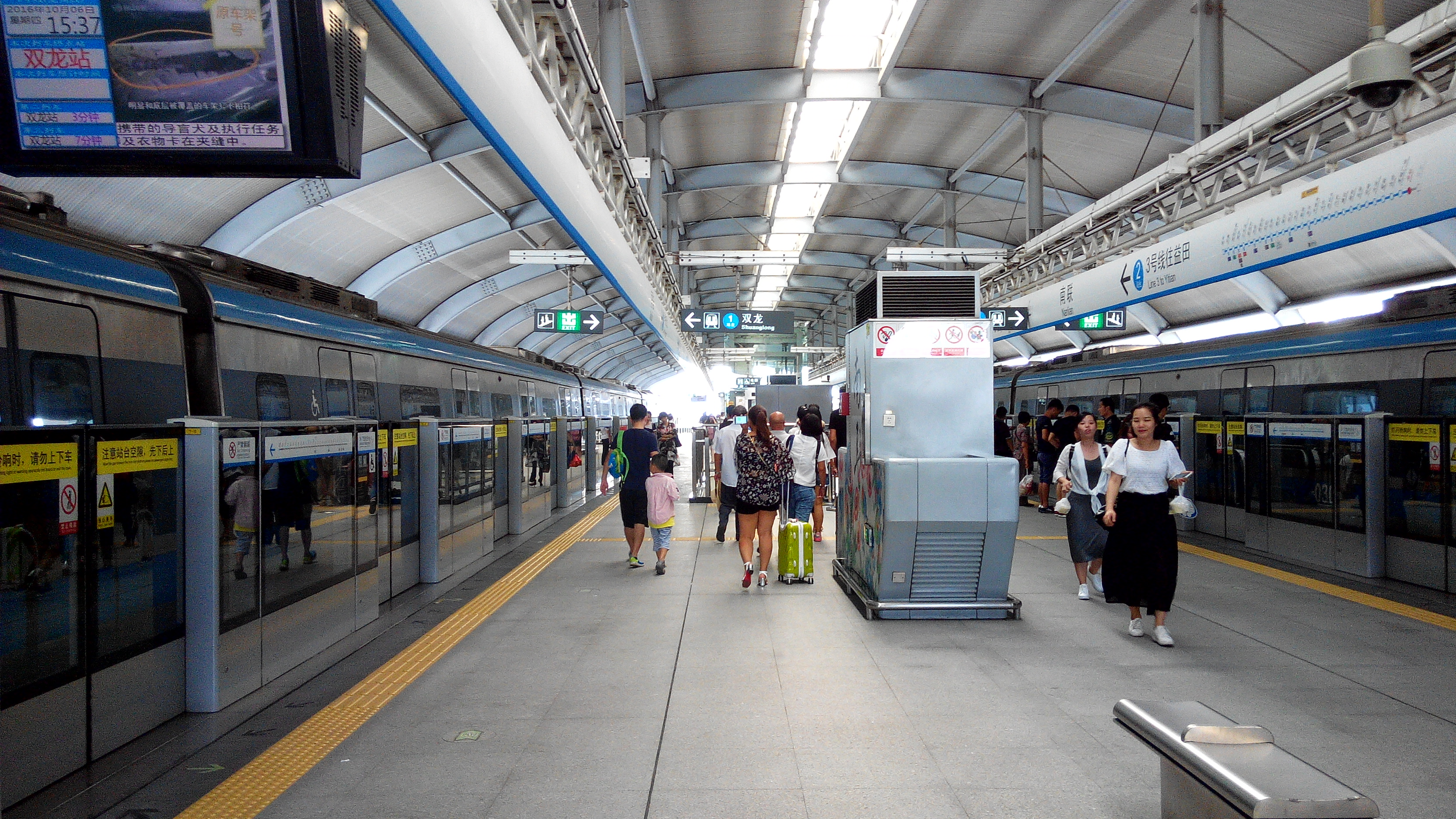
- Platform

General information
- Location: Longgang District, Shenzhen, Guangdong; China
- Coordinates: 22°43′19″N 114°15′56″E
- Operated by: Shenzhen Metro Line 3 Operations
- Line: Line 3
- Platforms: 2 (1 island platform)
- Tracks: 2

Construction
- Structure type: Elevated
- Accessible: Yes

History
- Opened: 28 December 2010 (15 years ago)

Services
Preceding station	Shenzhen Metro	Following station
Longcheng Square towards Futian Bonded Area	Line 3	Shuanglong towards Pingdi Liulian
Location

Nanlian station (Chinese: 南联站; pinyin: Nánlián Zhàn) is a station on Line 3 of the Shenzhen Metro, in China. It opened on 28 December 2010.

== Station layout ==
3F; Platforms	Platform	3 towards Futian Bonded Area (Longcheng Square)
3F; Platforms	Island platform, doors will open on the left
3F; Platforms	Platform	3 towards Pingdi Liulian (Shuanglong)
2F; Concourse	Lobby	Ticket Machines, Customer Service, Shops, Vending Machines
G	-	Exits A-C

== Exits ==
Exit		Destination
Exit A		Shenhui Road (S), Longgang Boulevard (S)
Exit B	B1	Bixin Road (W)
Exit B	B2	Longgang Street Office
Exit B	B3	Jianshe Road
Exit B	B4	Moore City
C		Shenhui Road (N), Longgang Boulevard (N)
