= Liyuan station (Shenzhen Metro) =

Shenzhen Metro Line 3 station

Liyuan 梨园
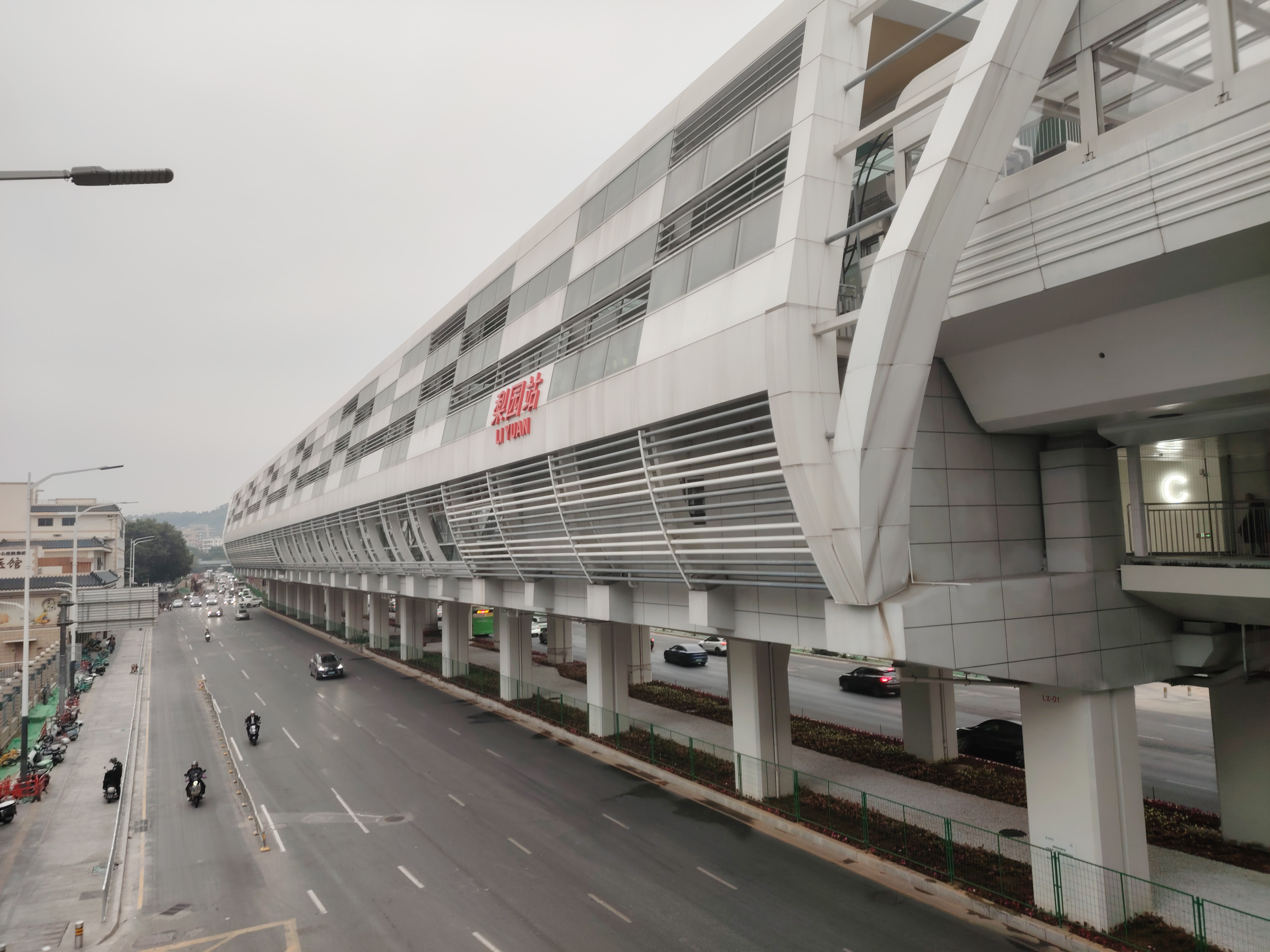
- Exterior

Chinese name
- Simplified Chinese: 梨园
- Traditional Chinese: 梨園
Transcriptions
Standard Mandarin
- Hanyu Pinyin: Líyuán
Yue: Cantonese
- Jyutping: Lei4 Jyun4

General information
- Location: 6082 Longgang Avenue (龙岗大道); Longgang District, Shenzhen, Guangdong; China
- Coordinates: 22°32′25″N 114°04′35″E
- Operated by: SZMC (Shenzhen Metro Group)
- Line: Line 3
- Platforms: 2 (1 island platform)
- Tracks: 2

Construction
- Structure type: Elevated
- Accessible: Yes

History
- Opened: 28 December 2024 (17 months ago)

Services
| Preceding station | Shenzhen Metro | Following station |
|---|---|---|
| Shuanglong towards Futian Bonded Area | Line 3 | Xinsheng towards Pingdi Liulian |
Location

Liyuan station (simplified Chinese: 梨园站; traditional Chinese: 梨園站; pinyin: Líyuán Zhàn; Jyutping: Lei4 Jyun4 Zaam6) is a station on Line 3 of Shenzhen Metro. It opened on 28 December 2024, and is located in Longgang District. The station is an elevated station, and is also the final elevated station to be built on the whole of Shenzhen Metro.

The station is part of the fourth phase of Line 3 (East Extension).

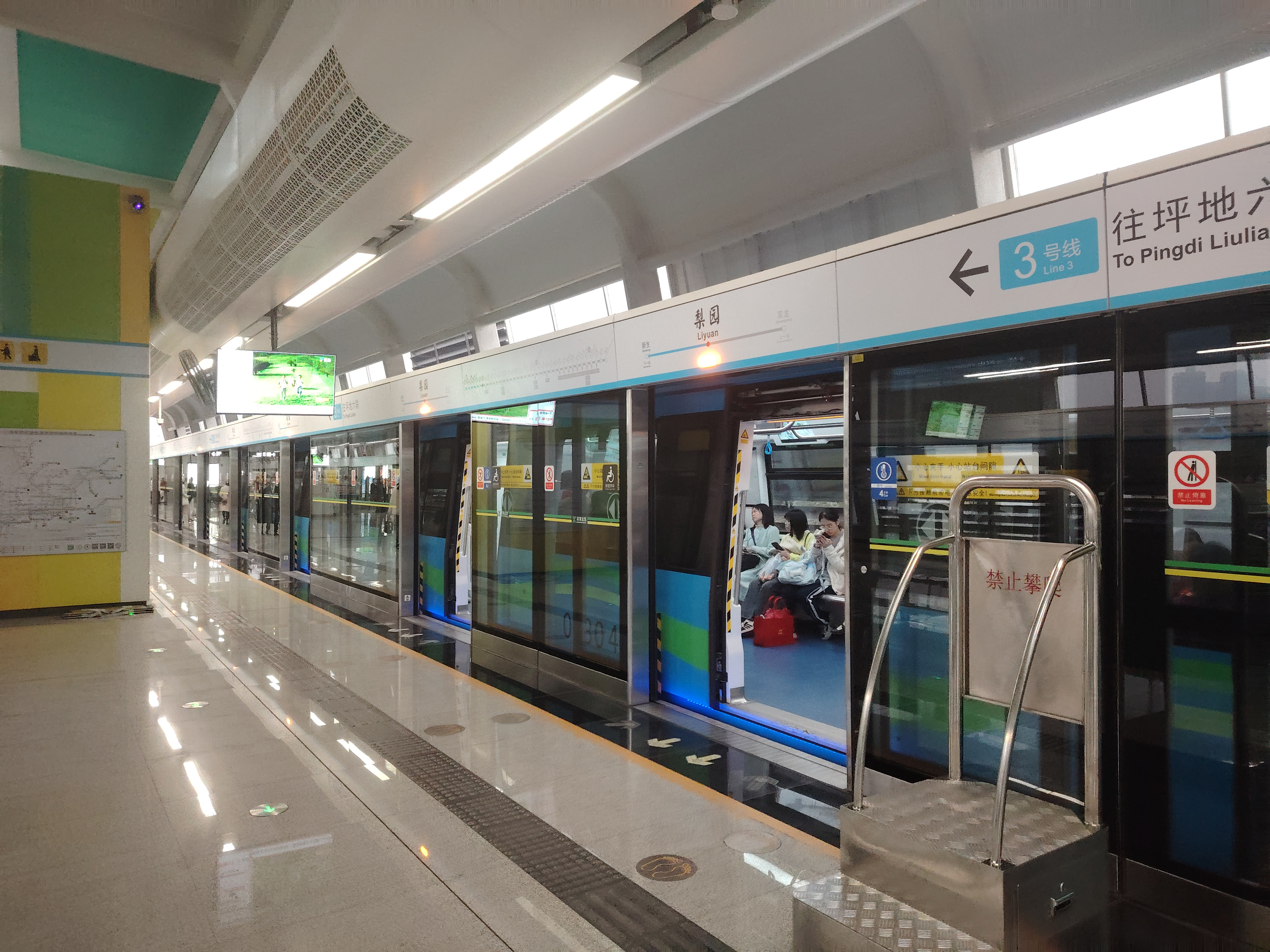
Platform

== Station layout ==
| 3F; Platforms | Platform | 3 towards Futian Bonded Area (Shuanglong) |
| 3F; Platforms | Island platform, doors will open on the left |
| 3F; Platforms | Platform | 3 towards Pingdi Liulian (Xinsheng) |
| 2F; Concourse | Lobby | Ticket Machines, Customer Service, Shops, Vending Machines |
| G | - | Exits B, C, D |

== Exits ==
| Exit letter | Gallery | Exit location |
|---|---|---|
| B | | East side of Longgang Boulevard (N), Shenzhen Longgang Central Hospital, Longqiao New Estate, Limin Agricultural Wholesale Market |
| C | | West side of Longgang Boulevard (N), Liwan Hotel, Huancheng Square, Longgang Middle School |
| D | | North side of Longgang Boulevard (W), Sanhe Flea Market |
