= Low Carbon City station =

Shenzhen Metro Line 3 station

Low Carbon City 低碳城
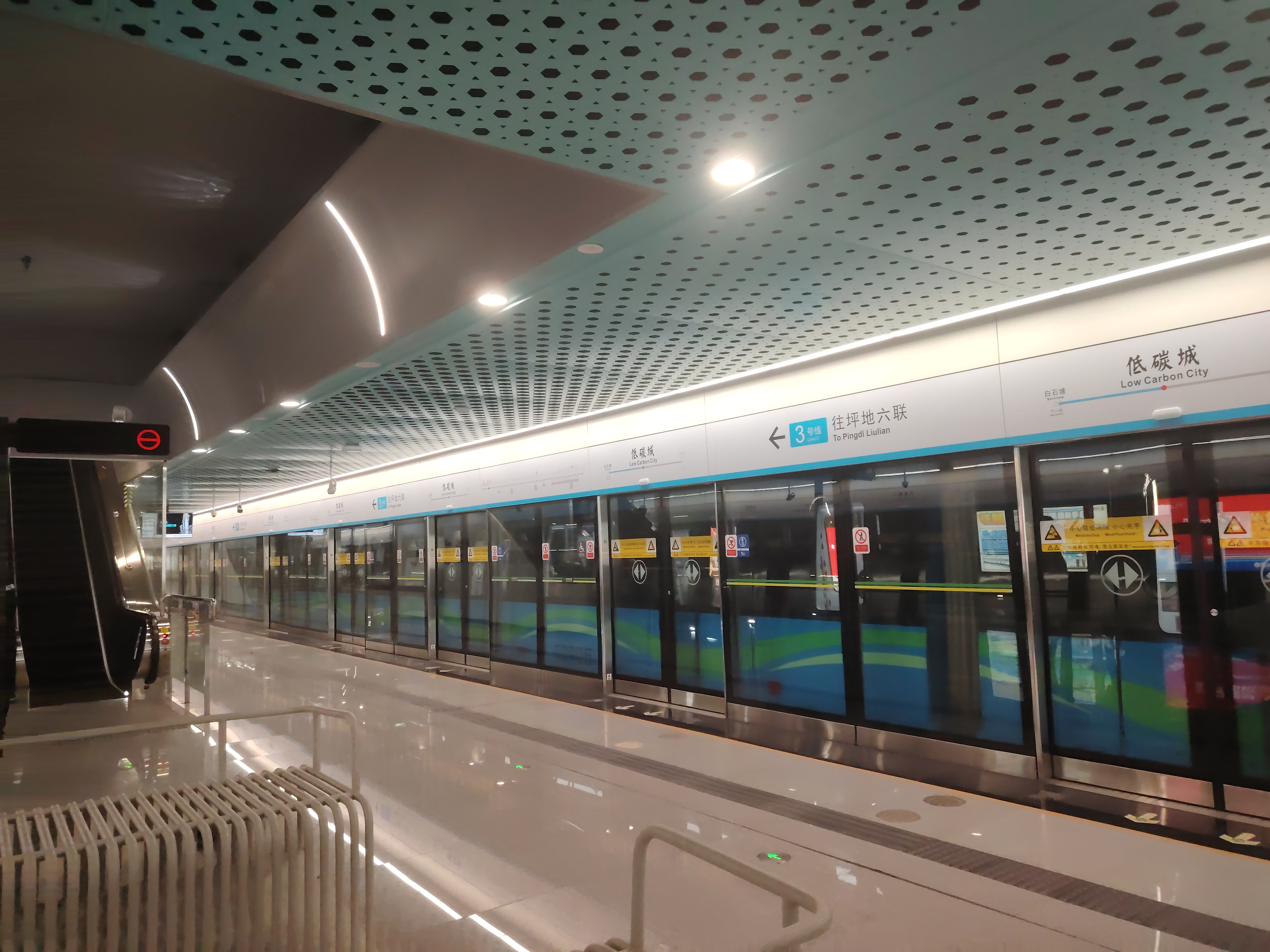
- Platform

Chinese name
- Chinese: 低碳城
Transcriptions
Standard Mandarin
- Hanyu Pinyin: Dītànchéng
Yue: Cantonese
- Yale Romanization: Dāitaansìhng
- Jyutping: Dai1taan3sing4

General information
- Location: Pingdi Subdistrict, Longgang District, Shenzhen, Guangdong; China
- Coordinates: 22°46′26″N 114°17′06″E
- Operated by: SZMC (Shenzhen Metro Group)
- Line: Line 3
- Platforms: 2 (1 island platform)
- Tracks: 2

Construction
- Structure type: Underground
- Accessible: Yes

History
- Opened: 28 December 2024 (17 months ago)

Services
Preceding station	Shenzhen Metro	Following station
Pingxi towards Futian Bonded Area	Line 3	Baishitang towards Pingdi Liulian
Location

Low Carbon City station (Chinese: 低碳城站; pinyin: Dītànchéng Zhàn; Jyutping: Dai1taan3sing4 Zaam6; Cantonese Yale: Dāitaansìhng Jaahm), proposed name Gaoqiao (高橋), is a station on Line 3 of Shenzhen Metro. It opened on 28 December 2024, and is located underground in Pingdi Subdistrict in Longgang District.

The station is part of the fourth phase of Line 3 (East Extension),

== Gallery ==
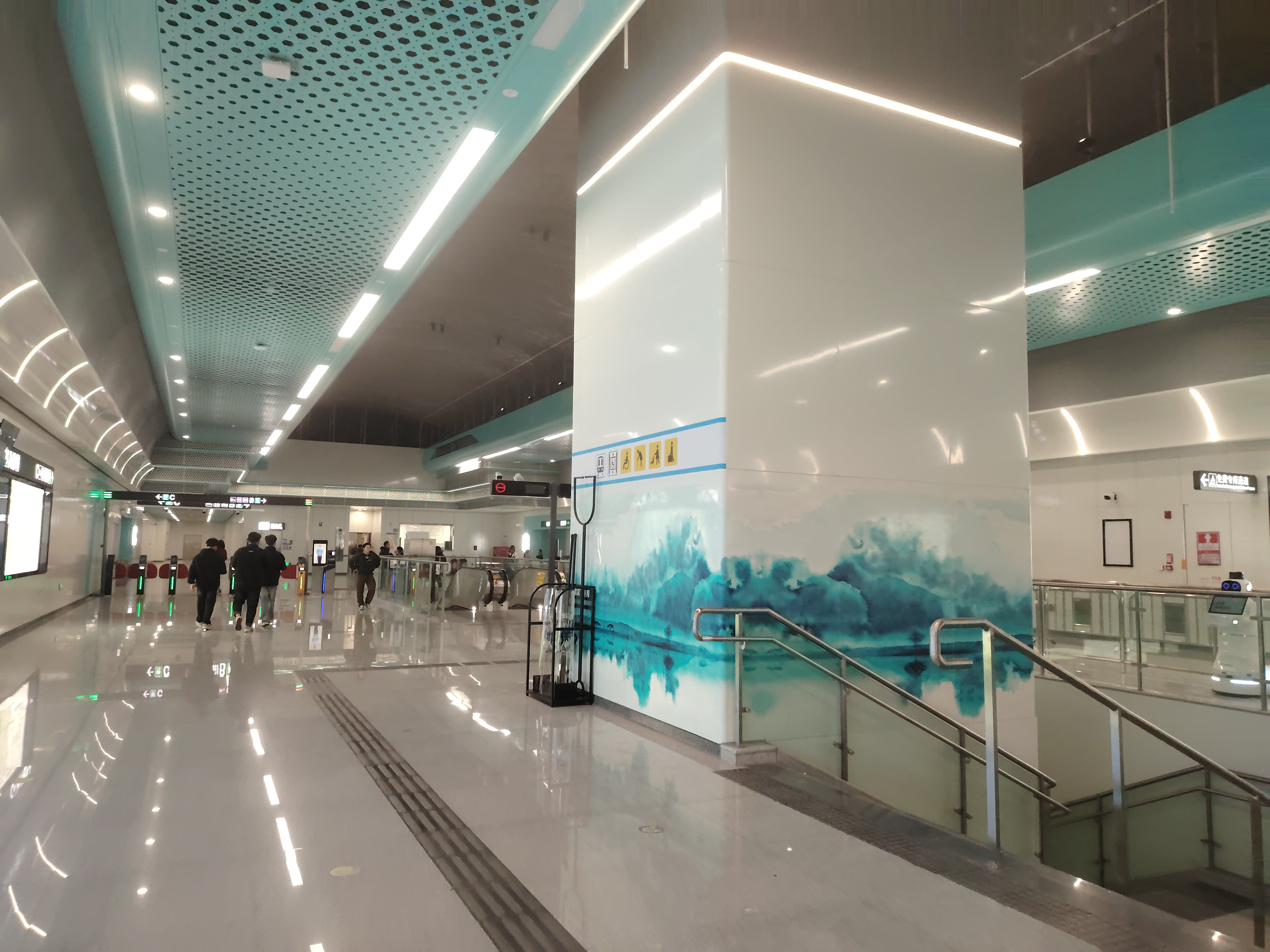
Concourse, in the middle is a station art column

== Station layout ==
G	-	Exits A-D
B1F; Concourse	Lobby	Ticket Machines, Customer Service, Shops, Vending Machines
B2F; Platforms	Platform	3 towards Futian Bonded Area (Pingxi)
B2F; Platforms	Island platform, doors will open on the left
B2F; Platforms	Platform	3 towards Pingdi Liulian (Baishitang)

=== Entrances/exits ===
The station has 4 points of entry/exit, with Exits A and C being accessible via elevators. Exit B has a toilet.

- A: Xiangji Road
- B: Xiangji Road
- C: Xiangji Road
- D: Xiangji Road
