= Longcheng Square station =

Metro station in Shenzhen, China

Longcheng Square 龙城广场
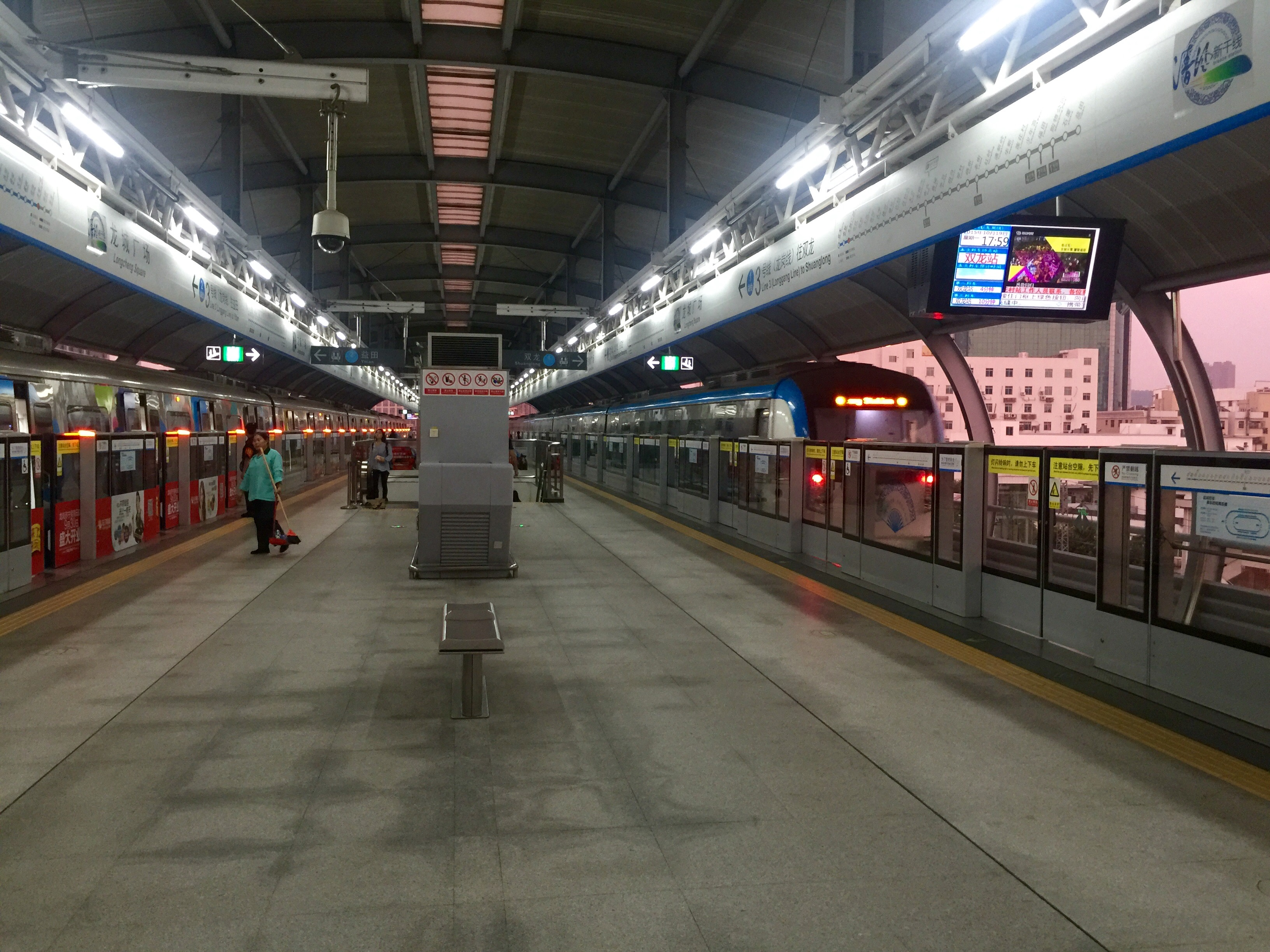
- Platform

General information
- Location: Longgang District, Shenzhen, Guangdong; China
- Coordinates: 22°43′2″N 114°15′16″E
- Operated by: Shenzhen Metro Line 3 Operations
- Line: Line 3
- Platforms: 2 (1 island platform)
- Tracks: 2

Construction
- Structure type: Elevated
- Accessible: Yes

History
- Opened: 28 December 2010 (15 years ago)

Services
Preceding station	Shenzhen Metro	Following station
Jixiang towards Futian Bonded Area	Line 3	Nanlian towards Pingdi Liulian
Location

Longcheng Square station (Chinese: 龙城广场站; pinyin: Lóngchéng Guǎngchǎng Zhàn) is a station on Line 3 of the Shenzhen Metro. It is located at the east of Longcheng Middle Road. The station opened on 28 December 2010. It is an elevated station. The station is located by Tesco Shenzhen, a branch of the British supermarket.

== Station layout ==
3F; Platforms	Platform	3 towards Futian Bonded Area (Jixiang)
3F; Platforms	Island platform, doors will open on the left
3F; Platforms	Platform	3 towards Pingdi Liulian (Nanlian)
2F; Concourse	Lobby	Ticket Machines, Customer Service, Shops, Vending Machines
G	-	Exits A-D

== Exits ==
Exit	Destination
Exit A	Shenhui Road (S), Jianghui Home Furnishings Life Hall, Youyicheng Restaurant, Xiangqian Road
Exit B	Shenhui Road (S), 7 Days Inn, Cable TV Building, Xiangyin Road
Exit C	Shenhui Road (N), Longhe Road, Tesco Supermarket, International Tea Market, Oriental Pearl Town, Ren'an Hospital
Exit D	Shenhui Road (N), Longcheng Middle Road, Longcheng Square, Longgang District Government, Longgang District Public Security Bureau, Local Taxation Bureau, Finance Bureau, Longgang City Centre
