= Xinsheng station =

Shenzhen Metro Line 3 station

Xinsheng 新生
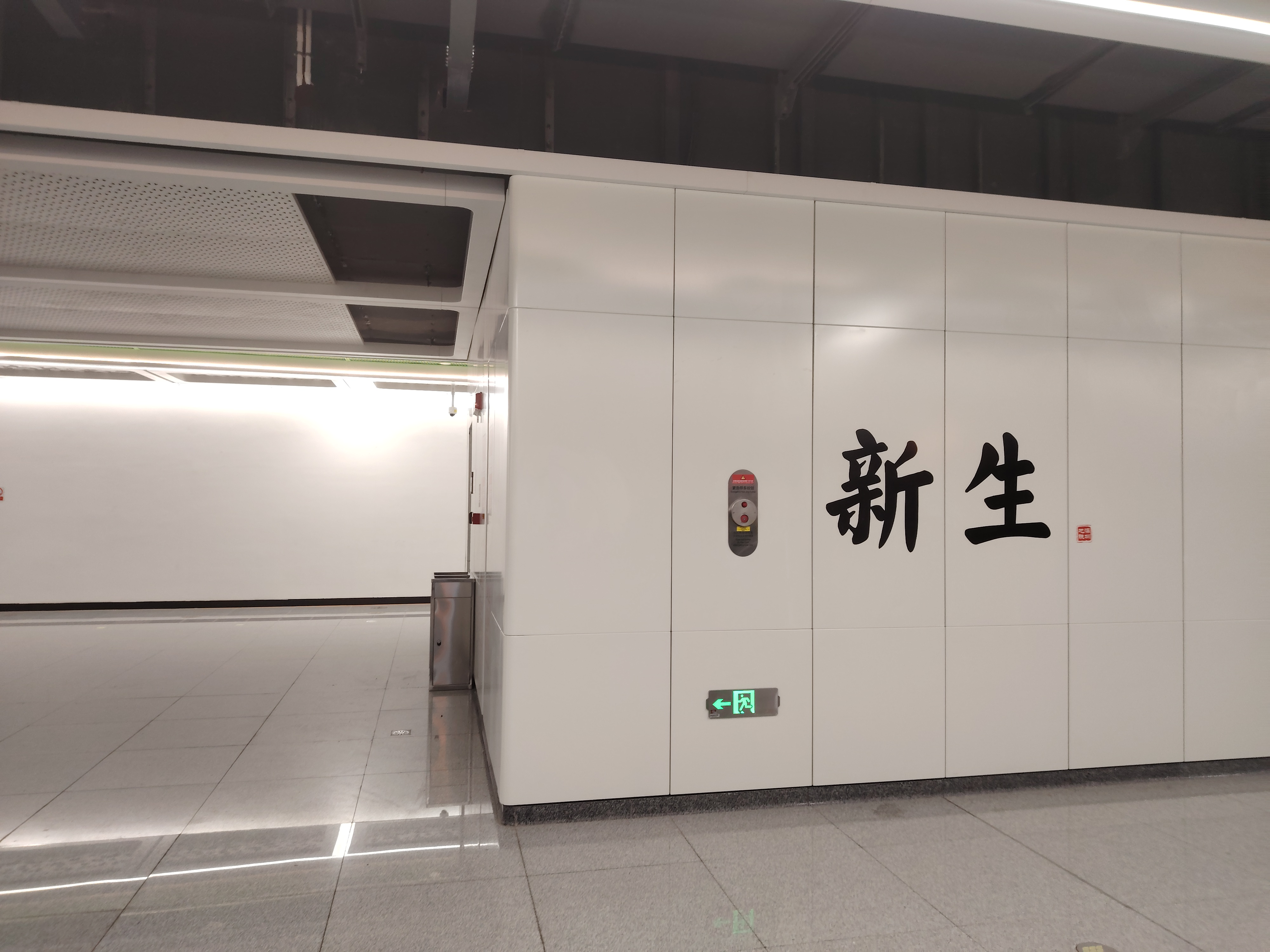
- Platform calligraphy

Chinese name
- Chinese: 新生
Transcriptions
Standard Mandarin
- Hanyu Pinyin: Xīnshēng
Yue: Cantonese
- Yale Romanization: Sānsāng
- Jyutping: San1saang1

General information
- Location: Intersection of Longgang Avenue (龙岗大道) and Xincheng Road (新城路); Longgang District, Shenzhen, Guangdong; China
- Coordinates: 22°45′3.56″N 114°16′41.74″E
- Operated by: SZMC (Shenzhen Metro Group)
- Line: Line 3
- Platforms: 4 (2 island platforms)
- Tracks: 2

Construction
- Structure type: Underground
- Accessible: Yes

History
- Opened: 28 December 2024 (17 months ago)

Services
Preceding station	Shenzhen Metro	Following station
Liyuan towards Futian Bonded Area	Line 3	Pingxi towards Pingdi Liulian
Location

Xinsheng station (Chinese: 新生站; pinyin: Xīnshēng Zhàn; Jyutping: San1saang1 Zaam6; Cantonese Yale: Sānsāng Jaahm) is a station on Line 3 of Shenzhen Metro. It opened on 28 December 2024, and is located underground in Longgang District.

The station is part of the fourth phase of Line 3 (East Extension).

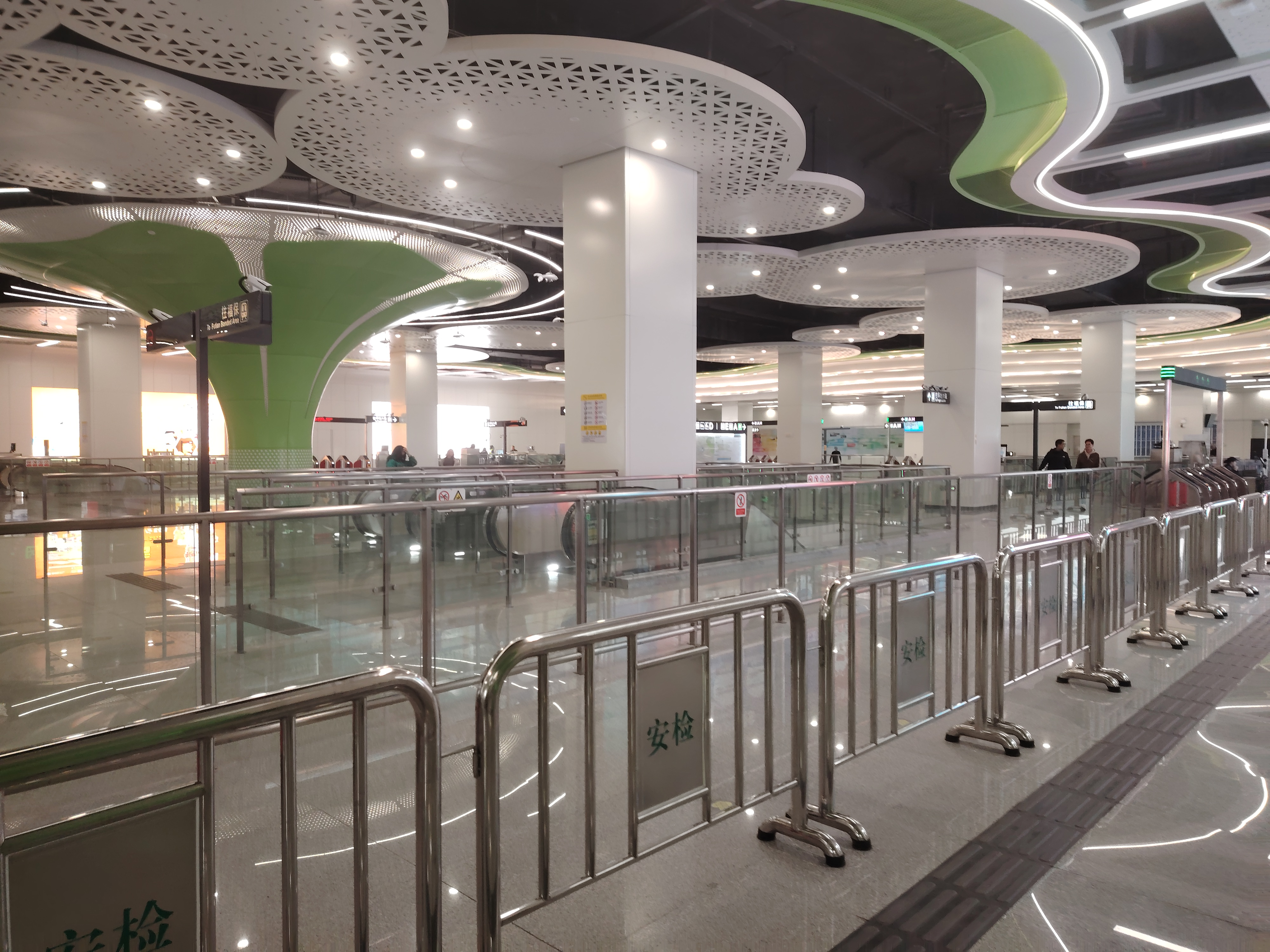
Concourse

== Station layout ==
G	-	Exits A-E
B1F; Concourse	Lobby	Ticket Machines, Customer Service, Shops, Vending Machines
B2F; Platforms	Platform	21 reserved platform
B2F; Platforms	Island platform, doors will open on the right
B2F; Platforms	Platform	3 towards Futian Bonded Area (Liyuan)
B2F; Platforms	Platform	3 towards Pingdi Liulian (Pingxi)
B2F; Platforms	Island platform, doors will open on the right
B2F; Platforms	Platform	21 reserved platform

=== Entrances/exits ===
The station has 5 points of entry/exit, with Exits A and C being accessible via elevators. Exit B has a toilet.

- A: Longgang Avenue (S)
- B: Longgang Avenue (N)
- C: Longgang Avenue (N)
- D: Xincheng Road
- E: Longgang Avenue (S)
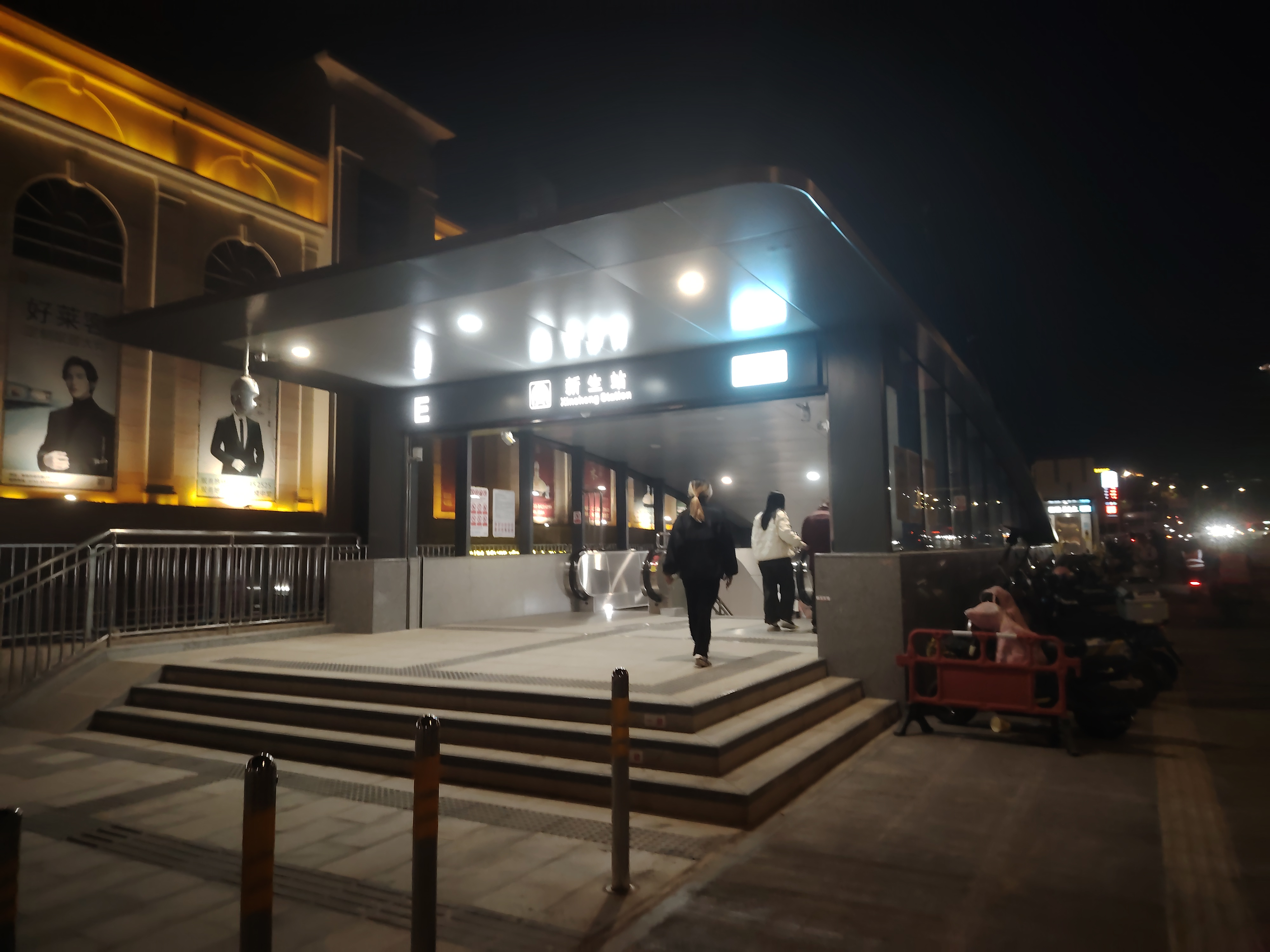
Entrance B

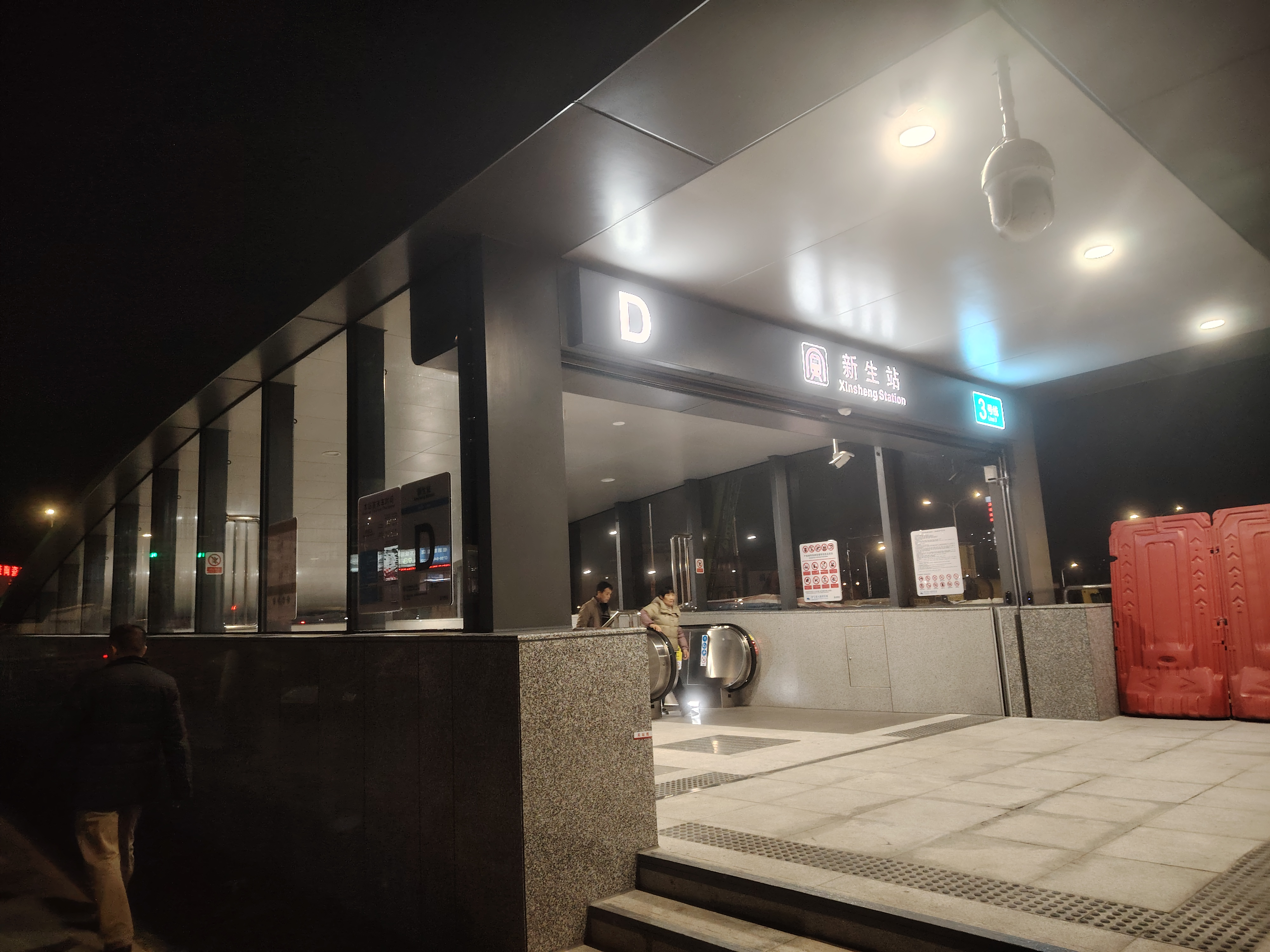
Entrance D
