= Jixiang station =

Metro station in Shenzhen, China

Jixiang 吉祥
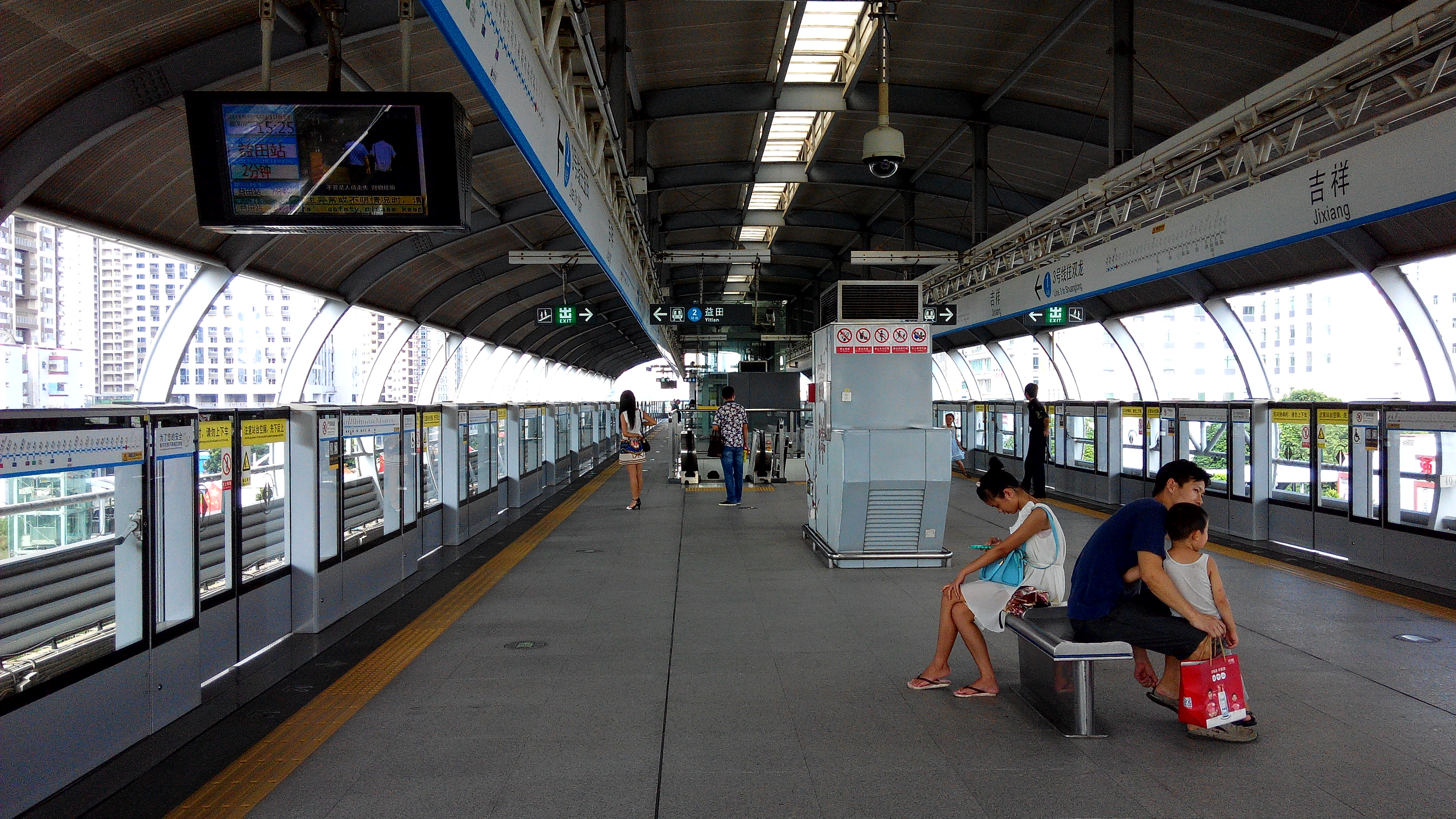
- Platform

General information
- Location: Longgang District, Shenzhen, Guangdong; China
- Coordinates: 22°42′34″N 114°14′38″E
- Operated by: Shenzhen Metro Line 3 Operations
- Line: Line 3
- Platforms: 2 (1 island platform)
- Tracks: 2

Construction
- Structure type: Elevated
- Accessible: Yes

History
- Opened: 28 December 2010 (15 years ago)

Services
Preceding station	Shenzhen Metro	Following station
Ailian towards Futian Bonded Area	Line 3	Longcheng Square towards Pingdi Liulian
Location

Jixiang station (Chinese: 吉祥站; lit. 'Lucky station') is a station on Line 3 of the Shenzhen Metro. The station opened on 28 December 2010. It is located in the south of Ailian village. There are 5 ticket vendors in Jixiang Station.

== Station layout ==
3F; Platforms	Platform	3 towards Futian Bonded Area (Ailian)
3F; Platforms	Island platform, doors will open on the left
3F; Platforms	Platform	3 towards Pingdi Liulian (Longcheng Square)
2F; Concourse	Lobby	Ticket Machines, Customer Service, Shops, Vending Machines
G	-	Exits A-D

== Exits ==
Exit	Destination
Exit A	Longgang Boulevard (S), Otolaryngology Hospital, Yonghu Yashang Hotel, Xinsihai Home Furnishings Plaza, Jixiang South Road, Park Lank, Wing Hang Bank Longgang Subbranch
Exit B	Shenhui Road (S), Longgang Boulevard (S), Shenzhen Ganglong Hospital, Denics Hotel, Versailles Furniture Group, Longxing Liantai International Furniture, Huguangtong Zhongshang Building
Exit C	Shenhui Road (N), Longgang Boulevard (N), Fenglinyu, Vanke Tianyu, Hongji Kindergarten, Xipu West Road
Exit D	Shenhui Road (N), Longgang Boulevard (N), Zhengzhong Fenglin International Centre, Longgang Branch of Hangzhou Bank, Wing Hang Bank, Minsheng Bank, Hongjin Garden, Hongji Garden, Jixianglai Garden, Longgang Terminal, Longgang Catholic Church, Lijing Centre 104–105
