= Pingxi station (Shenzhen Metro) =

Metro station in Shenzhen, China

Pingxi 坪西
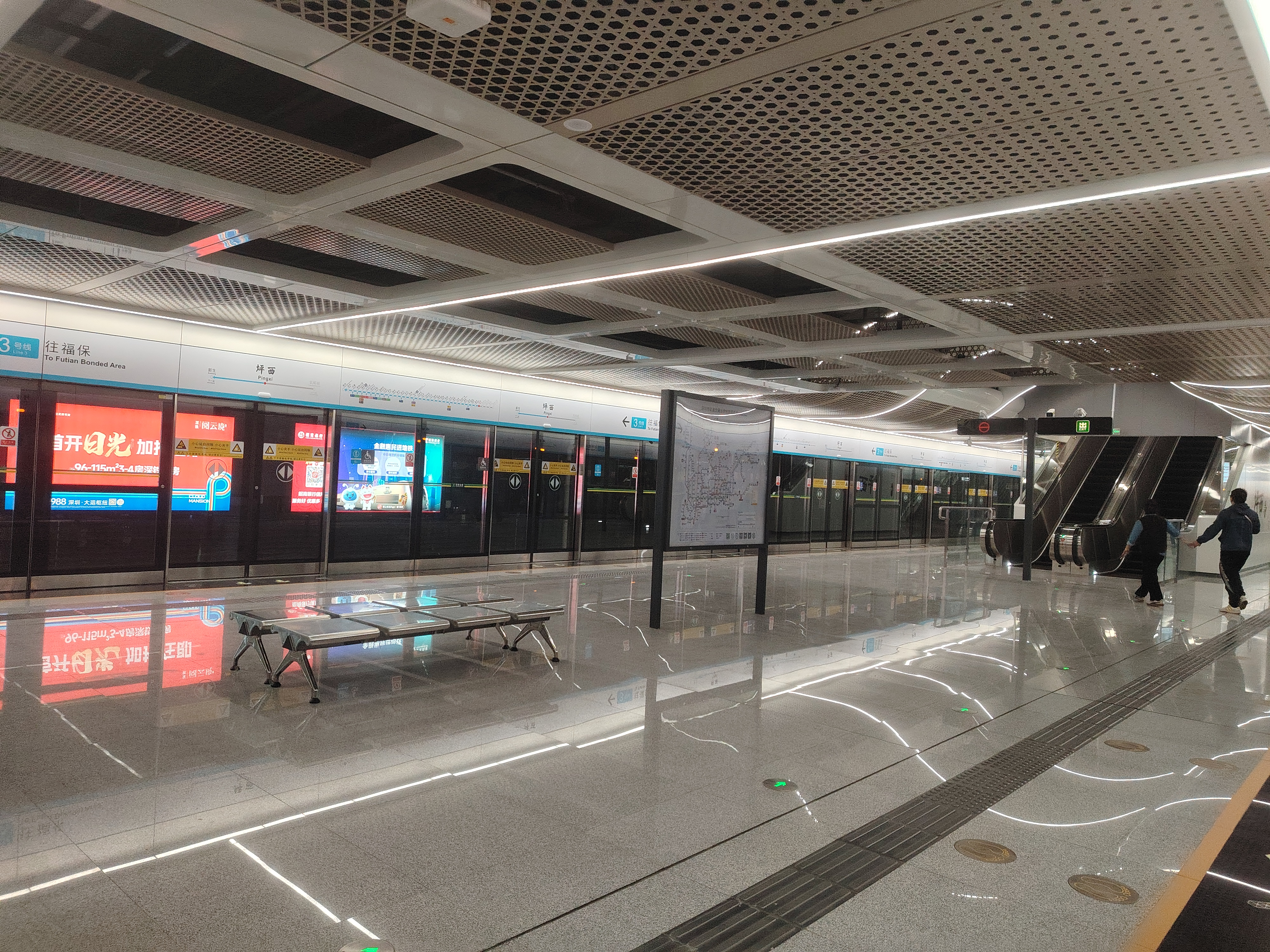
- Platform

Chinese name
- Chinese: 坪西
Transcriptions
Standard Mandarin
- Hanyu Pinyin: Píngxī
Yue: Cantonese
- Yale Romanization: Pìngsāi
- Jyutping: Ping4sai1

General information
- Location: Intersection of Pingxi Road (坪西路) and Huayuan Road (花园路); Pingdi Subdistrict, Longgang District, Shenzhen, Guangdong; China
- Coordinates: 22°45′57.319″N 114°16′38.071″E
- Operated by: SZMC (Shenzhen Metro Group)
- Line: Line 3
- Platforms: 2 (1 island platform)
- Tracks: 2

Construction
- Structure type: Underground
- Accessible: Yes

History
- Opened: 28 December 2024 (17 months ago)

Services
Preceding station	Shenzhen Metro	Following station
Xinsheng towards Futian Bonded Area	Line 3	Low Carbon City towards Pingdi Liulian
Location

Pingxi station (Chinese: 坪西站; pinyin: Píngxī Zhàn; Jyutping: Ping4sai1 Zaam6; Cantonese Yale: Pìngsāi Jaahm) is a station on Line 3 of Shenzhen Metro. It opened on 28 December 2024, and is located underground in Pingdi Subdistrict in Longgang District.

The station is part of the fourth phase of Line 3 (East Extension).

== Station layout ==
G	-	Exits A-D
B1F; Concourse	Lobby	Ticket Machines, Customer Service, Shops, Vending Machines
B2F; Platforms	Platform	3 towards Futian Bonded Area (Xinsheng)
B2F; Platforms	Island platform, doors will open on the left
B2F; Platforms	Platform	3 towards Pingdi Liulian (Low Carbon City)

=== Entrances/exits ===
The station has 4 points of entry/exit, with Exits A and C being accessible via elevators.

- A: Pingxi Road Middle
- B: Pingxi South Road
- C: Pingxi Road Middle
- D: Pingxi South Road
