= Line 3 (Shenzhen Metro) =

Metro line in Shenzhen, China

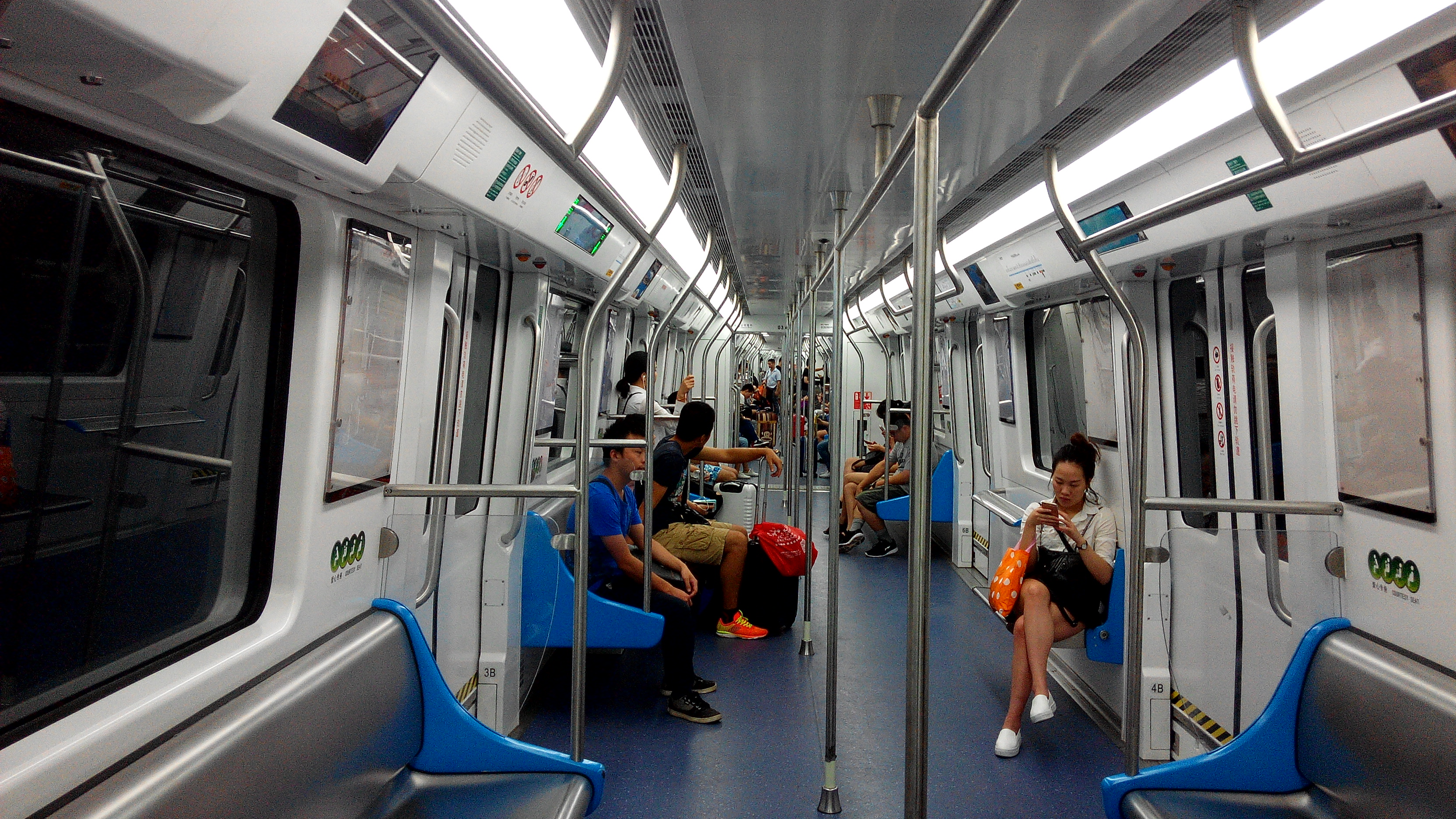
- Interior of CSR Nanjing Puzhen train

Overview
- Other names: Longgang line (龙岗线; 龍崗線; Lónggǎng Xiàn; Lung4 Gong1 Sin3)
- Native name: 三号线; 三號線; Sānhào Xiàn; Saam1 Hou6 Sin3
- Status: Operational
- Locale: Shenzhen, Guangdong, China
- Termini: Futian Bonded Area; Pingdi Liulian
- Stations: 38
- Color on map: Light Blue (#00a2e1)

Service
- Type: Rapid transit
- System: Shenzhen Metro
- Services: 1
- Operator(s): (SZMC) Shenzhen Metro Group
- Depot(s): Henggang depot Central Park stabling yard
- Rolling stock: CNR Changchun (301–343) (6B); CSR Nanjing Puzhen (344–376) (6B)
- Daily ridership: 1 million (2018 peak)

History
- Opened: 28 December 2010; 14 years ago
- Last extension: 28 December 2024; 11 months ago

Technical
- Line length: 52.33 km (32.52 mi)
- Number of tracks: 2
- Character: Underground and elevated
- Track gauge: 1,435 mm (4 ft 8 1/2 in) standard gauge
- Electrification: 1,500 V DC (third rail)
- Operating speed: 90 km/h (56 mph)
- Signalling: Bombardier Cityflo 650 CBTC Moving block

Line 3 (formerly branded as Longgang line) of the Shenzhen Metro runs northeastward from Futian Bonded Area to Pingdi Liulian. Line 3 opened on 28 December 2010.

Since opening, it has been heavily trafficked and became a major transport option for urban workers. Line 3 currently has a service interval of 5 minutes between trains across the entire length of the line. Sectional trains operate on weekdays, between Huaxin and Tangkeng, from 7:15 am to 9:15 am and from 5:45 pm to 7:45 pm. This is to alleviate surges in passenger traffic at Buji, since the opening of the connecting Shenzhen East.

== History ==
The first phase of Shenzhen Metro Line 3 started construction in July 2007. On 23 April 2008, the Shenzhen Municipal Planning Bureau renamed the still under construction Shenzhen Metro Line 3 to "Longgang Line". The renaming was later reverted in 2013.

=== First stage ===
The first phase of the line from Shuanglong to Caopu stations officially began operations on 28 December 2010. This section is almost entirely elevated except near Tangkeng. It starts from Longgang District and runs mainly along Shenhui Road, to Luohu District. The first phase has 16 stations, with a total length of 25.138 km (15.620 mi).

=== Second stage ===
The first phase (underground section) of the line from Caopu to Hongling stations and the second phase of the line from Hongling to Yitian stations, opened on 28 June 2011.

=== Third stage ===
The third phase of the line from Futian Bonded Area to Yitian stations, opened on 28 October 2020.

=== Fourth stage ===
The fourth phase of the line from Shuanglong to Pingdi Liulian stations, opened on 28 December 2024.

Segment	Commencement	Length	Station(s)	Name
Caopu — Shuanglong	28 December 2010	25.138 km (15.62 mi)	16	Phase 1 (elevated section)
Yitian — Caopu	28 June 2011	16.522 km (10.27 mi)	14	Phase 1 (underground section) & Phase 2
Futian Bonded Area — Yitian	28 October 2020	1.5 km (0.93 mi)	1	Phase 3
Shuanglong — Pingdi Liulian	28 December 2024	9.4 km (5.84 mi)	7	Phase 4

== Future development ==
=== Long term plans ===
Long term plans include extending Line 3 even further east into neighboring Huizhou City along with Line 14. On 7 August 2013 a "Memorandum of Cooperation" was signed to coordinate transport planning and urban development between the two cities, formalizing the planning process for the proposal.

== Service routes ==
- Futian Bonded Area — Pingdi Liulian (Before 11:00 PM)
- Huaxin — Tangkeng (Working days peak hours only)
- Some train services from Futian Bonded Area to Tangkeng (usually at peak hours and 11:00 PM to 11:30 PM).
- Some train services from Pingdi Liulian to Huaxin (usually at peak hours and 11:00 PM to 11:30 PM).

== Stations ==
Service routes				Station name		Connections	Nearby bus stops	Distance km		Location
Service routes				English	Chinese	Connections	Nearby bus stops	Distance km		Location
●	↓			Futian Bonded Area	福保		26 52 60 62 385 B618 B962 M120 M476	0.00	0.00	Futian
●	↓			Yitian	益田		4 26 71 80 103 317 339 362 375 377 B685 B820 M347 M362 M433 M453 M500 M511	1.60	1.60	Futian
●	↓			Shixia	石厦	7	28 34 73 202 303 372 B689 B957 K113 M370 M389 M390	0.88	2.48	Futian
●	↓			Shopping Park	购物公园	1	3 9 64 71 235 325 327 371 373 374 379 398 B709 E1 E20 E25 K318 K359 M221 M223 M224 M441 M454 M459 Peak-time 14（高峰14） Peak-time 17（高峰17） Peak-time 95（高峰95） Sightseeing 4（观光4）	1.10	3.58	Futian
●	↓			Futian	福田	2 8 11 GSH NZQ	9 32 38 60 71 101 107 113 123 204 223 234 235 236 320 326 327 330/Airport 1（机场1） 374 395 398 B613 B709 E18 E28 K204 K318 K578 M221 M262 M363 M390 M413 M414 M435 M447 M448 N3 N4 N4区间 N9 Peak-express 18（高快18） Peak-express 20（高快20） Peak-time 15（高峰15） Peak-time 18（高峰18） Peak-time 38（高峰38） Peak-time 49（高峰49） Peak-time 58（高峰58） Peak-time 62（高峰62） Peak-time 119（高峰119） Peak-time 134（高峰134） Sightseeing 1（观光1）	0.73	4.31	Futian
●	↓			Children's Palace	少年宫	4	10 34 41 46 64 65 108 111 215 383 M262 M372 M459 M488 Peak-time 123（高峰123）	1.53	5.84	Futian
●	↓			Lianhuacun	莲花村	10	10 14 34 46 64 65 67 75 104 108 111 123 215 237 313 322 333 339 357 371 379 383 398 E28 K105 M204 M221 M223 M262 M347 M372 M374 M383 M389 M454 M459 M488 M500 M521 Peak-express 18（高快18） Peak-time 15（高峰15） Peak-time 21（高峰21） Peak-time 106（高峰106） Peak-time 123（高峰123）	0.80	6.64	Futian
●	↓	↑	●	Huaxin	华新	7	9 10 13 41 64 67 108 123 225 236 302区间 303 383 385 B622 K105 M202 M460 N6 Peak-express 4（高快4） Peak-time 119（高峰119）	1.93	8.57	Futian
●	↓	↑	●	Tongxinling	通新岭	6	4 8 9 10 12 13 64 65 80 108 123 202 207 225 303 375 383 393 B622 K105 M370 M389 M476 M481 N6 N17	1.00	9.57	Futian
●	↓	↑	●	Hongling	红岭	9	7 10 23 63 64 85 108 207 225 352 383 393 E8 E25 M360 M401 M463 N6 N10	0.70	10.27	Futian
●	↓	↑	●	Laojie	老街	1 17	3 10 12 14 29 59 64 85 103 104 113 203 204 211 214 215 223 302 309 336 337 351 E8 K113 M399 M402 M481 M482 N3 N4 N6 N14 Sightseeing 1（观光1） Sightseeing 2（观光2）	1.46	11.73	Luohu
●	↓	↑	●	Shaibu	晒布		1 3 5 11 59 64 69 82 102 103 113 203 211 306 307 309 351 369 B909 H92 M399 M402 M403 M404 M407 M408 M481 M482 M508 M509 N3 N6 N7 N16 N19 Peak-express 20（高快20） Sightseeing 2（观光2）	0.93	12.66	Luohu
●	↓	↑	●	Cuizhu	翠竹		2 3 13 57 59 62 64 65 83 103 107 113 202 203 211 218 242 306 333 351 E11 E11区间 E12 H92 M348 M399 M407 M481 M482 M508 N2 N3 N6 U1 Airport 6（机场6） Peak-time 97（高峰97）	1.11	13.77	Luohu
●	↓	↑	●	Tianbei	田贝	7	1 2 57 59 62 63 83 107 203 209 242 320 333 371 376 379 977 M406 M482 N2 N6 N7 N10	1.46	15.23	Luohu
●	↓	↑	●	Shuibei	水贝		23 225 B840	1.06	16.29	Luohu
●	↓	↑	●	Caopu	草埔		2 18 27 201 213 222 303 307 308 309 312 321 322 323 357 366 369 371 373 374 375 376 377 383 398 836 956 977 B698 E24 M203 M224 M240 M267 M269 M283 M358 M402 M403 M404 M406 M408 M414 M421 M476 M485 M511 N6 N17 N19 Peak-time 11（高峰11） Peak-time 18（高峰18） Peak-time 19（高峰19） Peak-time 32（高峰32） Shen-Hui 3A（深惠3A） Sightseeing 2（观光2）	1.56	17.85	Luohu
●	↓	↑	●	Buji	布吉	5 14 BJQ GS	8 85 309 321 322 323 357 366 371 372 375 376 379 383 398 839 954 977 980 E24 M203 M224 M233 M244 M265 M268 M271 M273 M283 M295 M310 M311 M358 M378 M379 M404 M406 M408 M415 M485 M511 Peak-time 79（高峰79） Peak-time 124（高峰124） Shen-Hui 3A（深惠3A） Sightseeing 2（观光2） Wutong-Hill 2（梧桐山2）	2.18	20.03	Longgang
●	↓	↑	●	Mumianwan	木棉湾		8 58 306 309 321 322 323 357 366 371 372 373 374 375 376 379 383 398 822 836 839 954 977 B695 M203 M224 M233 M265 M268 M271 M272 M273 M281 M283 M295 M310 M358 M378 M379 M403 M404 M406 M408 M476 M485 M508 Peak-time 17（高峰17） Peak-time 19（高峰19） Peak-time 32（高峰32） Shen-Hui 3A（深惠3A） Wutong-Hill 2（梧桐山2）	1.08	21.11	Longgang
●	↓	↑	●	Dafen	大芬		8 309 322 323 357 366 372 373 374 380B 398 812 839 977 B695 B810 K359 M227 M233 M268 M273 M283 M295 M300 M358 M363 M378 M395 M485 M508 M511 Peak-express 20（高快20） Peak-time 17（高峰17） Peak-time 19（高峰19） Peak-time 124（高峰124） Shen-Hui 3A（深惠3A）	1.16	22.27	Longgang
●	↓	↑	●	Danzhutou	丹竹头	17	8 9 61 309 357 366 372 379 380B 812 839 B810 B882 M227 M233 M268 M283 M295 M324 M358 M378 M485 M491 M498 Peak-express 20（高快20） Peak-time 89（高峰89） Shen-Hui 3A（深惠3A）	1.26	23.43	Longgang
●	↓	↑	●	Liuyue	六约		61 309 351 357 366 380B 812 M229 M266 M268 M295 M309 M324 M359 M378 Peak-express 20（高快20） Shen-Hui 3（深惠3） Shen-Hui 3A（深惠3A）	3.91	27.34	Longgang
●	↓	↑	●	Tangkeng	塘坑		309 351 357 366 380B 812 B679 B750 M266 M268 M295 M309 M359 M378 Peak-express 20（高快20） Shen-Hui 3（深惠3） Shen-Hui 3A（深惠3A）	1.37	28.71	Longgang
●		↑		Henggang	横岗		309 351 358 366 380A 812 B750 M266 M268 M295 M309 M359 M378 Peak-express 15（高快15） Peak-time 64（高峰64） Shen-Hui 3（深惠3） Shen-Hui 3A（深惠3A）	2.00	30.71	Longgang
●		↑		Yonghu	永湖		309 351 358 366 380A 812 906 B679 M266 M268 M295 M314 M357 M359 M394 M466 Peak-time 64（高峰64） Shen-Hui 3（深惠3） Shen-Hui 3A（深惠3A）	1.51	32.22	Longgang
●		↑		He'ao	荷坳		309 351 358 366 380A 812 833 M229 M266 M268 M294 M314 M357 M359 M368 M386 M394 M466 Dapeng-holiday 1（大鹏假日1） Shen-Hui 3A（深惠3A）	1.71	33.93	Longgang
●		↑		Universiade	大运	14 16	309 330B 351 358 366 380A 812 833 868 868区间1 923 B852 E21 E23 M229 M266 M268 M294 M303 M314 M316 M317 M318 M322 M357 M359 M367 M368 M386 M446 M466 T1 T2A Dapeng-holiday 1（大鹏假日1） Shen-Hui 3A（深惠3A）	1.48	35.41	Longgang
●		↑		Ailian	爱联		309 330B 358 366 380A 811 812 833 868 868区间1 E23 M266 M268 M278 M319 M320 M322 M359 T1 T2A Dapeng-holiday 1（大鹏假日1） Shen-Hui 3A（深惠3A）	1.48	36.89	Longgang
●		↑		Jixiang	吉祥		309 330B 358 366 380A 811 812 833 868 868区间1 M266 M268 M275 M278 M319 M320 M359 M367 M502 T1 T2A Dapeng-holiday 1（大鹏假日1） Shen-Hui 2支（深惠2支） Shen-Hui 3A（深惠3A）	1.72	38.61	Longgang
●		↑		Longcheng Square	龙城广场		309 351 365 366 380A 811 812 818 818大站快 839 862 868 868区间1 929 B723 B751 E6 E7 E21 E23 E25 E27 M220 M230 M266 M268 M275 M303 M306 M315 M359 M361 M367 M431 M447 M502 T1 Dapeng-holiday 1（大鹏假日1） Dapeng-holiday 12（大鹏假日12） Shen-Hui 3A（深惠3A）	1.37	39.98	Longgang
●		↑		Nanlian	南联		309 351 365 366 380A 811 812 818 818大站快 839 868 868区间1 B669 E6 E27 M220 M266 M268 M275 M303 M305 M308 M315 M317 M359 M361 M394 M431 M447 M452 T1 Dapeng-holiday 1（大鹏假日1） Shen-Hui 1（深惠1） Shen-Hui 3A（深惠3A）	1.26	41.24	Longgang
●		↑		Shuanglong	双龙	16	309 351 365 366 380A 810 811 812 818 818大站快 839 862 862区间 868 868区间1 B669 E6 E7 E21 E23 E25 M230 M266 M268 M275 M276 M277 M278 M280 M304 M305 M307 M308 M316 M359 M361 M386 M431 M447 M497 T1 Dapeng-holiday 1（大鹏假日1） Dapeng-holiday 12（大鹏假日12） Shen-Hui 1（深惠1） Shen-Hui 2（深惠2） Shen-Hui 2支（深惠2支） Shen-Hui 3A（深惠3A）	1.44	42.68	Longgang
●		↑		Liyuan	梨园		351 802 810 811 862 M139 M219 M239 M275 M276 M279 M280 M307 M308 M386 M396	0.94	43.62	Longgang
●		↑		Xinsheng	新生		811 862 M139 M239 M275 M279 M280 M308 M396	1.42	45.04	Longgang
●		↑		Pingxi	坪西		811 M163 M219 M275	1.80	46.84	Longgang
●		↑		Low Carbon City	低碳城		811 M163 M275	1.18	48.02	Longgang
●		↑		Baishitang	白石塘		M308 M316 M367	1.43	49.45	Longgang
●		↑		Fuping	富坪			1.00	50.45	Longgang
●		↑		Pingdi Liulian	坪地六联			1.63	52.08	Longgang

== Rolling stock ==
Type	Date of manufacture	Series	Sets	Serial number	Assembly	Notes
Type B	2009–2010	B-size stock	43	0301-0343	Tc+M+M+M+M+Tc	Manufactured by CNR Changchun Railway Vehicles, traction units by Hyundai Rotem (Some trains now use CRRC Times Electric traction units after undergoing routine maintenance in Changchun)
Type B	2014–2016	B-size stock	33	0344-0376	Tc+M+M+M+M+Tc	Manufactured by CSR Nanjing Puzhen, traction units by Hyundai Rotem
Type B	2023–2024	B-size stock	22	0377-0398	Tc+M+M+M+M+Tc	Manufactured by CRRC Nanjing Puzhen

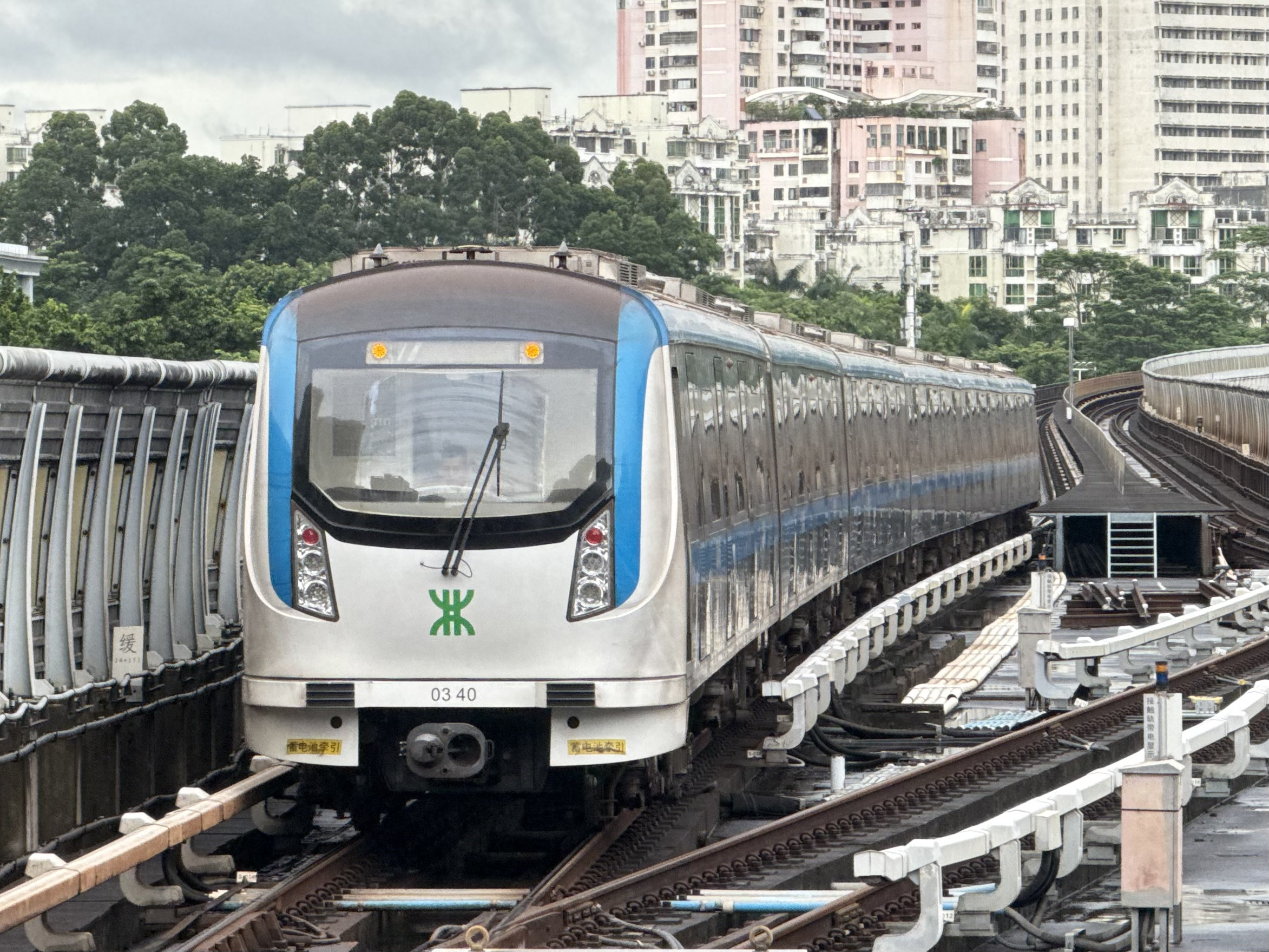
CNR Changchun Railway Vehicles train

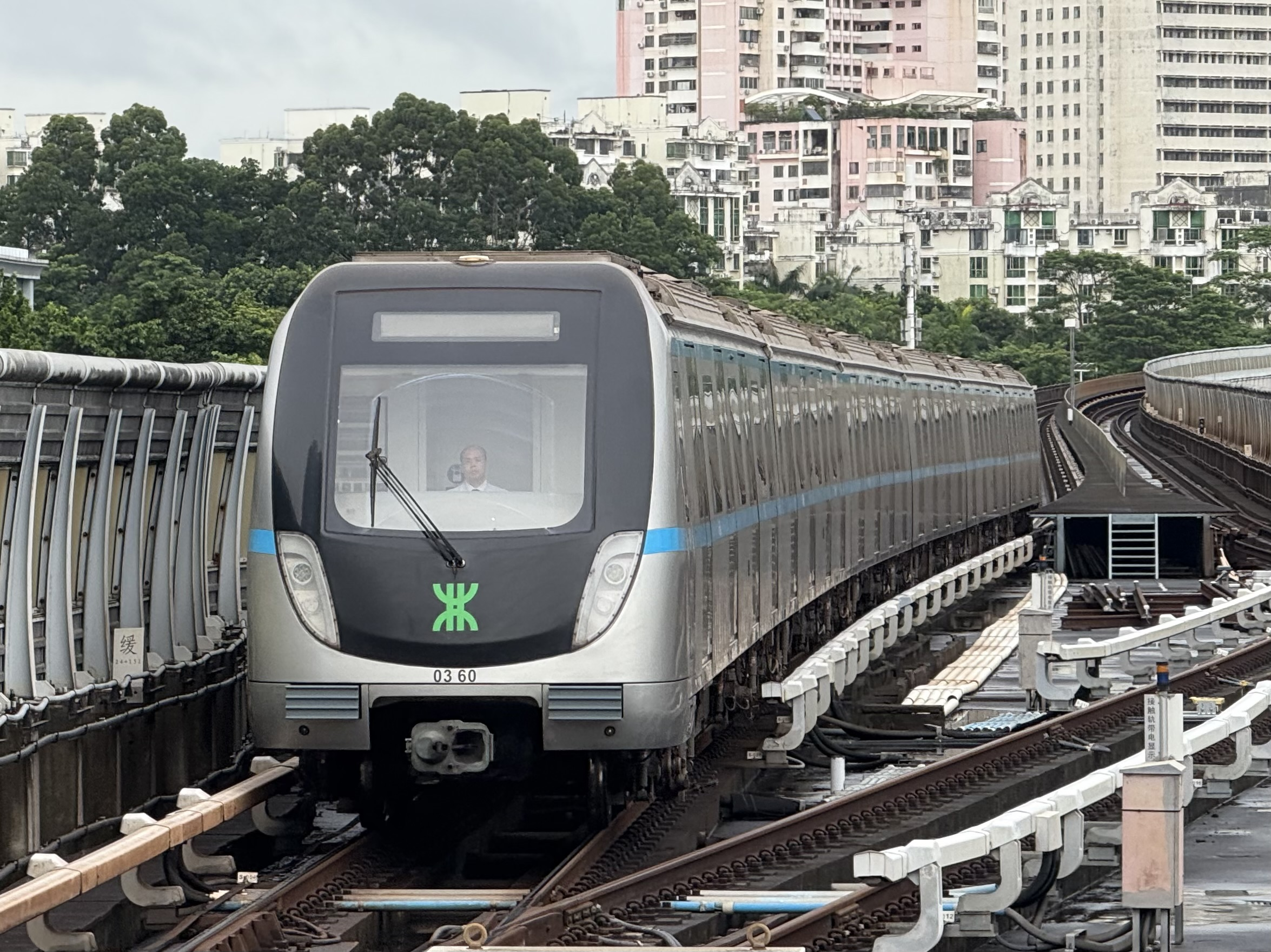
CSR Nanjing Puzhen train

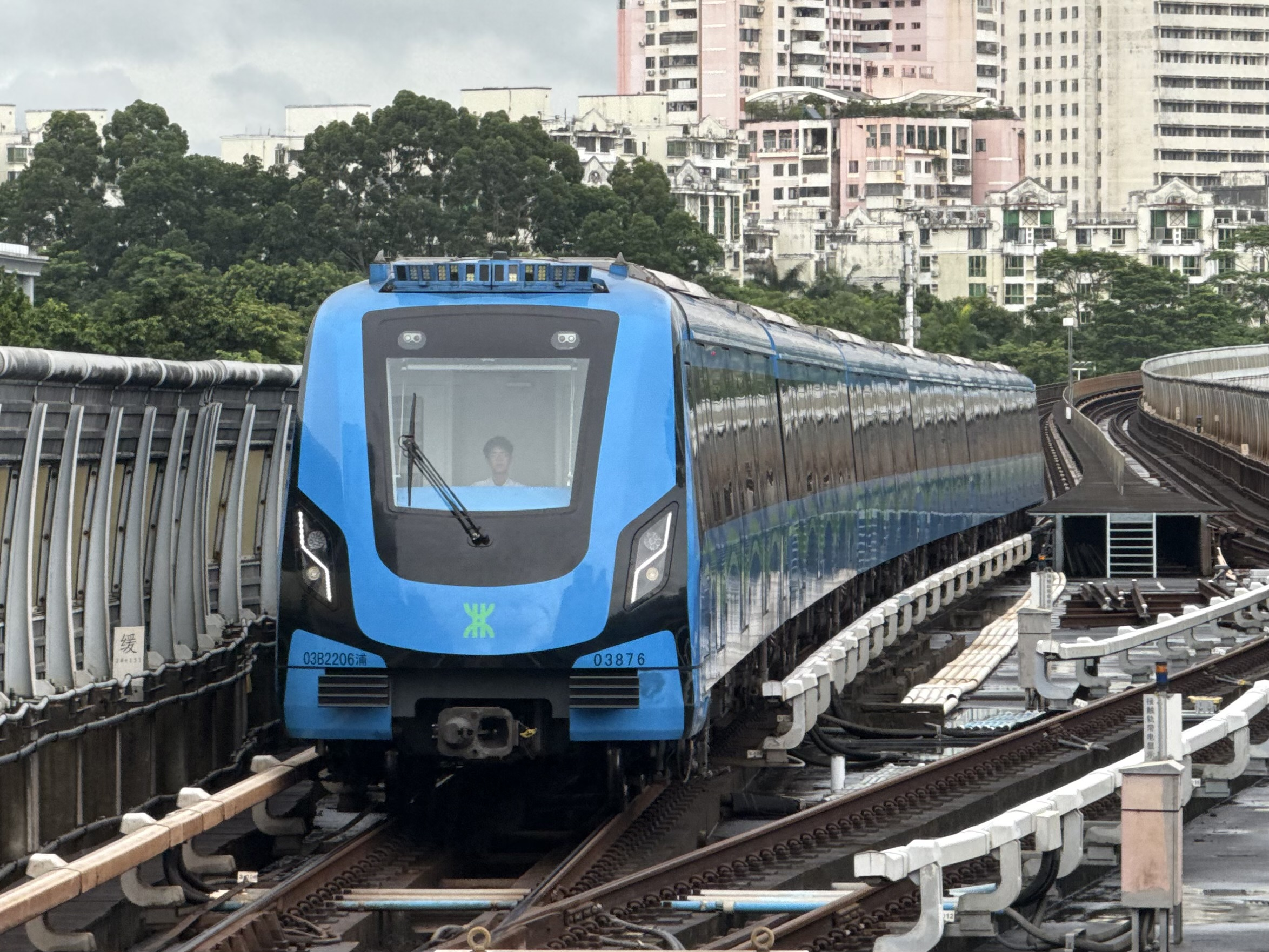
CRRC Nanjing Puzhen train
