= Futian Bonded Area station =

Metro station in Shenzhen, Guangdong, China

Futian Bonded Area 福保
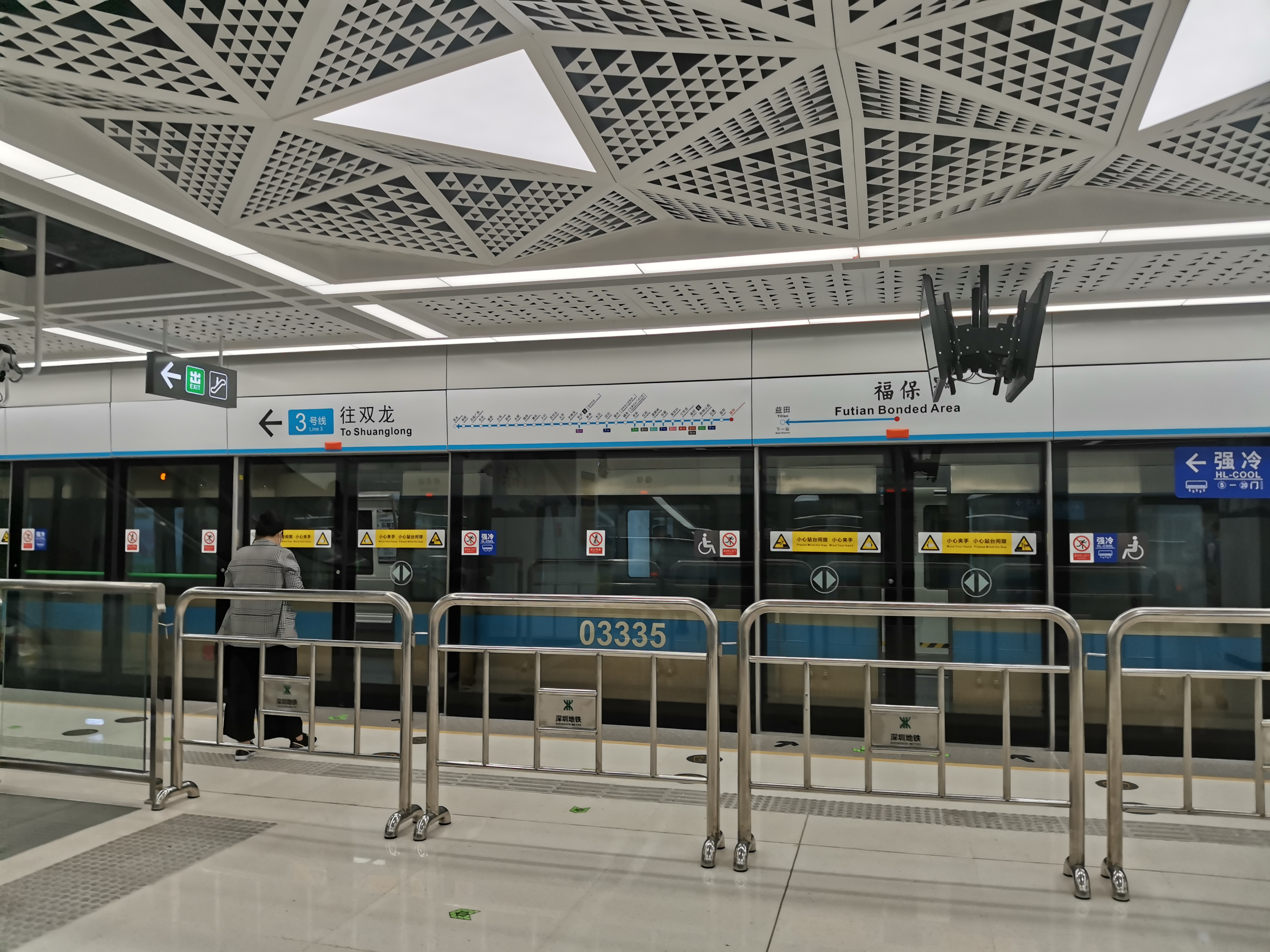
- Platform

Chinese name
- Chinese: 福保站
Transcriptions
Standard Mandarin
- Hanyu Pinyin: Fúbǎo Zhàn
Yue: Cantonese
- Jyutping: Fuk1 Bou2 Zaam6

General information
- Location: Ronghua Road (绒花路) / Honghua Road (红花路); Futian District, Shenzhen, Guangdong; China
- Coordinates: 22°30′39″N 114°03′02″E
- Operator: Shenzhen Metro Group
- Line: Line 3
- Platforms: 2 (1 island platform)
- Tracks: 2

Construction
- Structure type: Underground
- Accessible: Yes

History
- Opened: 28 October 2020

Services
Preceding station	Shenzhen Metro	Following station
Terminus	Line 3	Yitian towards Pingdi Liulian
Route map
Location

Futian Bonded Area (Chinese: 福保) is the southern terminal station on Line 3 of the Shenzhen Metro. It opened on 28 October 2020. The Chinese name "福保" is short for "福田保税区", relates the Futian Bonded Zone where the station is.

== Station layout ==
G	Street level	Exits A-F
B1F; Concourse	Lobby	Ticket Machines, Customer Service, Shops, Vending Machines
B2F; Platforms	Platform	3 termination platform
B2F; Platforms	Island platform, doors will open on the left
B2F; Platforms	Platform	3 towards Pingdi Liulian (Yitian)

== Entrances/exits ==
- A: No public access
- B: South side of Honghua Rd (E), Shihua Rd (E), Jinhua Rd (E), Zijing St (S), west side of Hongmian St (S), Hetao Alpha, Hetao Cooperation Zone Staff Service Center, Changfu Jinmao Building, Changping Business Building, Fortune Plaza
- E1 & E2: North side of Ronghua Rd (E), east side of Yitian Rd, Shenfubao Building, Zijing St, Nanguang Zijing Garden
- E3 & E4: North side of Ronghua Rd (W), west side of Yitian Rd, Diganghaiwanhaoyuan
- F1 & F2: North side of Ronghua Rd (W), Binglang St (N), Donghai Garden, Tianjian Fashion Mingyuan, Futian Bonded Area Police Station, Fuyuan Garden, Haihong St (N), Guihua Rd (W), Guihua Rd Urban Park
