= Culture of Shenzhen =

Customs and traditions in Shenzhen, China

Shenzhen (Chinese: 深圳; pinyin: Shēn zhèn) is a major city in Guangdong Province, China. A young city, it has rapidly developed its culture with the construction of cultural facilities and the introduction of themed cities. It hosts cultural events, such as the International Cultural Industry Expo, and was awarded the UNESCO title of "Design City." The city promotes reading and offers free access to cultural facilities.

Shenzhen's culture is diverse, influenced by the Punti and Hakka ethnic groups and a blend of southern and northern cultural elements. It has shifted from Hong Kong's influence to mainland China's, all while incorporating Western and regional Chinese cultural influences. The city's culture is a dynamic mix of traditions and contemporary elements.

== Overview ==
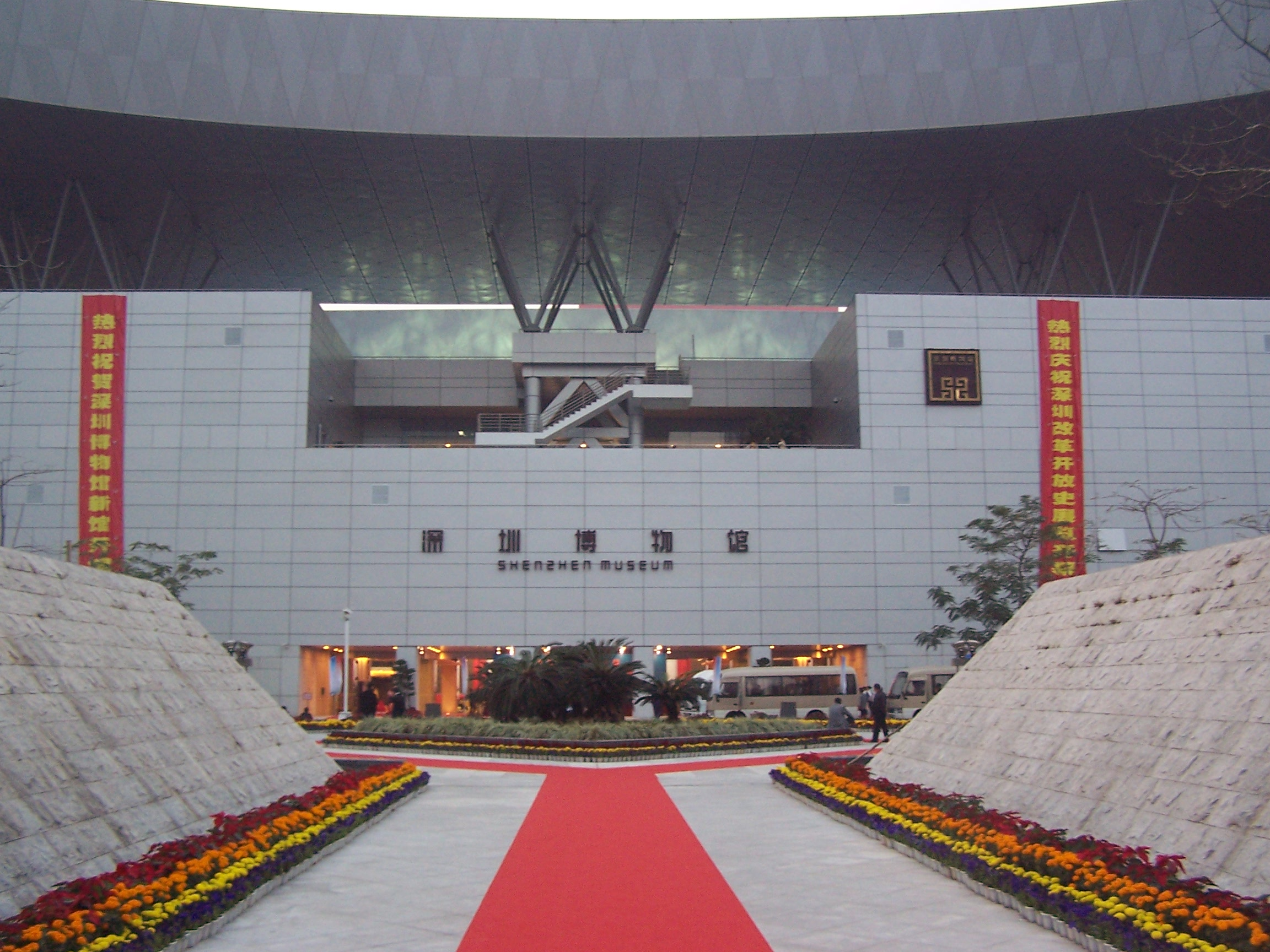
Shenzhen Museum

Although Shenzhen is a young city, only 30 years old, its culture is developing rapidly. From 1981 to 2000, numerous cultural facilities, such as museums, libraries, and art galleries, were constructed. Additionally, several magazines, including "Special Economic Zone Economy," were launched during this period. In 2003, the government proposed the strategy of "building a city with culture" and creating "two cities, one city and one base". These include a city dedicated to pianos, a city focused on libraries, a city centered around design, and an animation base. From November 18 to November 22, 2004, the first China (Shenzhen) International Cultural Industry Expo and Trade Fair, also known as the "Cultural Industry Expo," was held in Shenzhen. On November 19, 2008, Shenzhen was awarded the title of "Design City" by UNESCO, making it the sixth city in the world and the first in China to receive this honor. Shenzhen also holds a "Reading Month" festival, organized by the government, dedicated to promoting public reading activities. It was held 11 times consecutively until 2010, with a significant number of participants. The main contents include "Reading Forum," "Recommended Books for Reading and Book Collection," and "Recitation of Chinese and Foreign Classic Poems," etc. In 2007, Shenzhen announced that all public cultural facilities, including libraries, art galleries, and museums, would be permanently open to citizens for free. This was the first time such a policy was implemented in a Chinese city. Shenzhen Children's Palace is a modern youth activity center that serves as a hub for science popularization and art education.

Like most of the indigenous people in the New Territories of Hong Kong, there are two main ethnic groups: Punti(weitou) and Hakka. The Hakka people are mainly concentrated in Longgang, while the Weitou people are concentrated in Futian and Luohu. Due to its central location on the Guangzhou-Kowloon Railway and the influence of the cultures of the province and Hong Kong, as well as the influx of people from other northern provinces after the reform and opening up, Shenzhen has achieved cultural diversity. Shenzhen's culture exhibits diversity at the micro level, as well as a conflict between the southern and northern cultural systems at the macro level. Since the Shenzhen Special Administrative Region was primarily economically dependent on Hong Kong before the turn of the millennium, there has been a decrease in Hong Kong's influence and an increase in influence from the mainland since the mid-to-late 1990s. As a result, culturally, the northern culture has also gradually strengthened. At the same time, due to Shenzhen's internationalization strategy and the influence of the nearby international city, Hong Kong, Shenzhen blends the cultures of northern and southern China. It is also more Westernized compared to the mainland. The development of folk culture has its own vitality and characteristics. The "Dafen Village" spontaneously formed on Buji Street. The original rural village spontaneously organized unique activities during every festival. Food cultures from various places have a strong presence in Shenzhen. From time to time, the tide changes. There are many people in the Northeast, Sichuan, Hunan, Jiangxi, and Hubei regions of China, and they also have a significant influence on the local culture.

== Cultural facilities ==
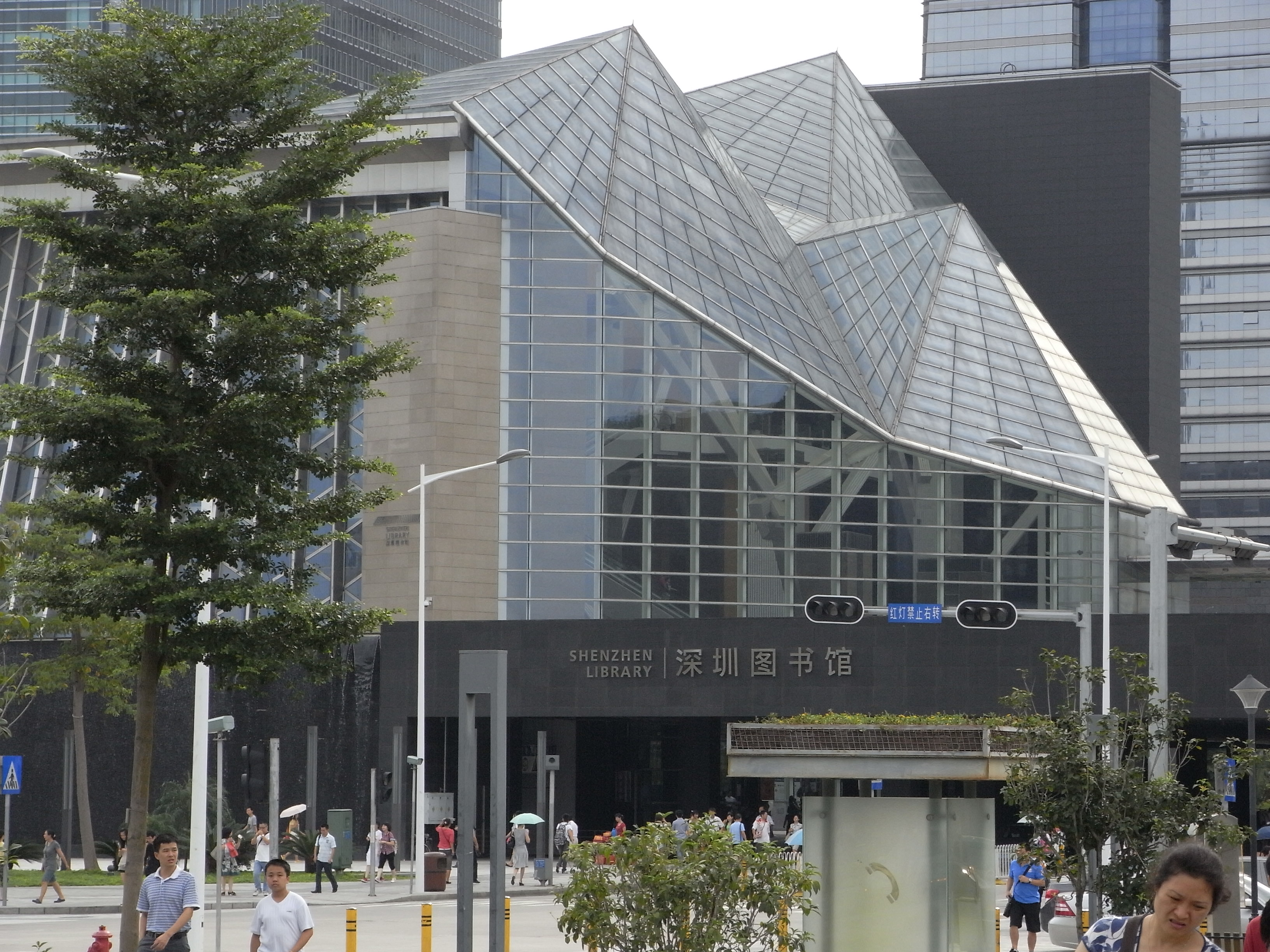
Shenzhen Library

Shenzhen's bookstores are large in scale, offering a wide range of products including books, audio-visual materials, musical instruments, and other cultural supplies. They are known as the "Book City." There are "book cities" distributed throughout all districts of the city, with the largest ones being Shenzhen Central Book City in Futian District, Jinshan Building Book City, and Nanshan Book City in Luohu District. Other bookstores in Shenzhen include Bao'an Book City, Longgang Book City, Yantian Book City, and more. Shenzhen Central Bookstore is situated in the Futian CBD District. It is the largest book sales center in Shenzhen. It sells 300,000 different types of books and is renowned as "Asia's largest independent bookstore".

Shenzhen is known as "a city living in libraries". It has 639 public libraries so far and plans to have 1,100 libraries by 2015, increasing from one public library for every 15,000 people now to one for every 10,000 people. . In July 1997, Shenzhen passed the "Shenzhen Special Economic Zone Public Library Regulations (Trial)", which was the first regulation on public library legislation in China. As of 2010, the city's public libraries had a total area of approximately 284,400 square meters and a total collection of 20,063,200 books. In 2010, the number of visitors to the library reached 21 million, and the number of borrowing services reached 8.6 million. All public libraries have wireless network coverage.

Libraries in Shenzhen have branches on most streets and offer "Library City" services. A library card can be used at most public libraries in the city. However, the number of seats in the library is insufficient, and some readers do not have the opportunity to use it during holidays. Stand or sit on the floor for long periods of time to read.

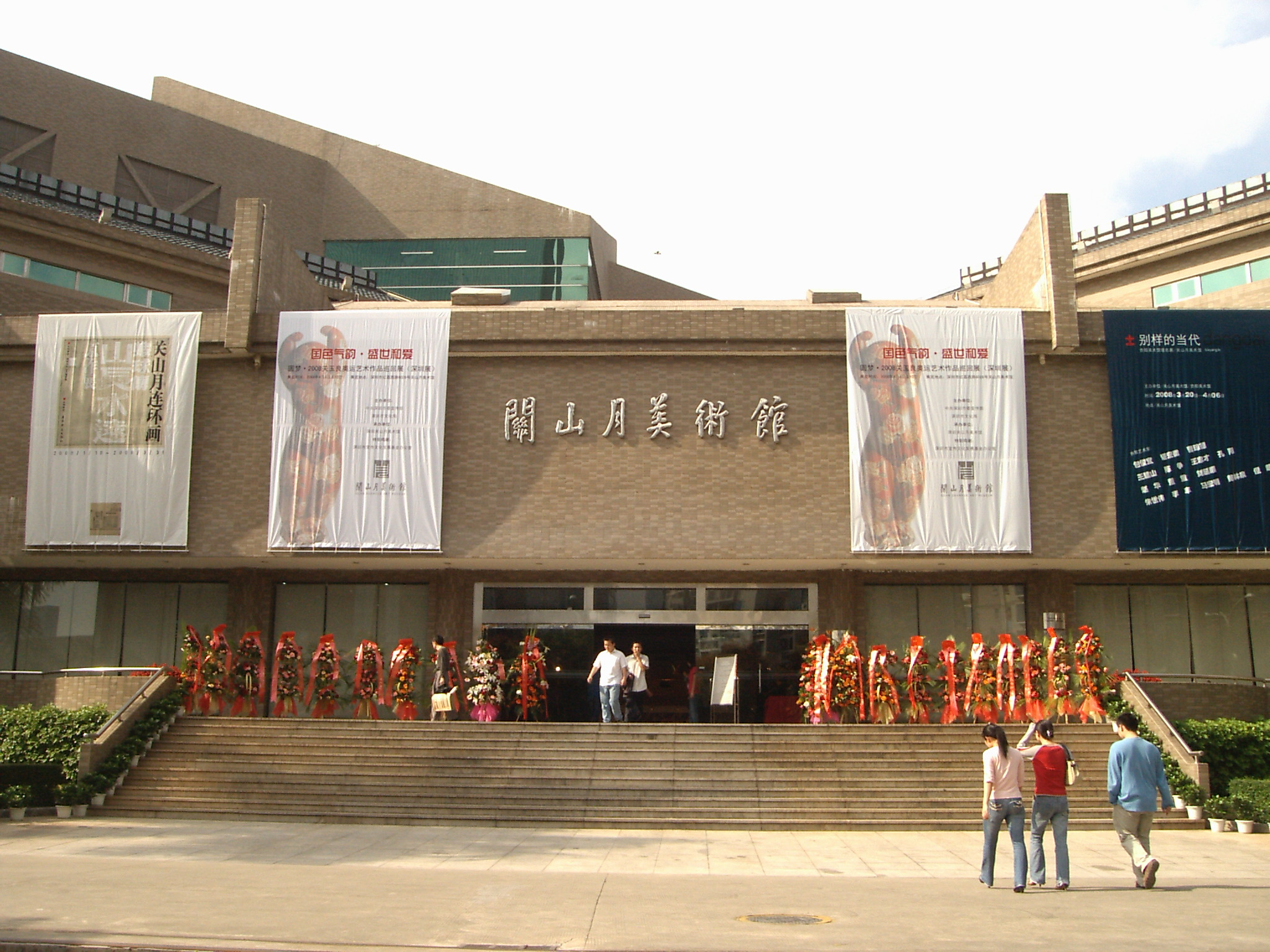
Guanshanyue Art Museum

The city's major art exhibition institutions include the Shenzhen Art Museum, the He Xiangning Art Museum, and the Guan Shanyue Art Museum. Shenzhen Art Museum is located in Donghu Park, Luohu District. The building was originally known as the Shenzhen Exhibition Hall, constructed in 1976. It was later renamed in 1987. The He Xiangning Art Museum was built in 1997. It primarily collects, exhibits, and studies the calligraphy and paintings of He Xiangning. The Guan Shanyue Art Museum is located at the southern foot of Lianhua Mountain. The museum primarily collects, studies, displays, and promotes the artworks of the renowned painter Guang Guan Shanyue. Additionally, it hosts art exhibitions.

Shenzhen Grand Theater was built in 1984 and opened in May 1989. It was the largest film and television screening and art performance center in Shenzhen during its early days, and it was also one of the eight major cultural facilities in the city at that time. The exterior of the theater is entirely made of glass curtain walls and has a square box shape. It has a theater, a concert hall, a cultural exhibition hall, a restaurant, a dance hall, and an underground commercial street, etc. The theater can accommodate 1,304 spectators. Since the theater's opening, numerous art troupes from the United States, Britain, France, Italy, and Japan have performed here. Additionally, domestic art groups have performed even more frequently. Since 1992, the theater has held the "Shenzhen Grand Theater Art Festival" annually, which has had a significant impact.

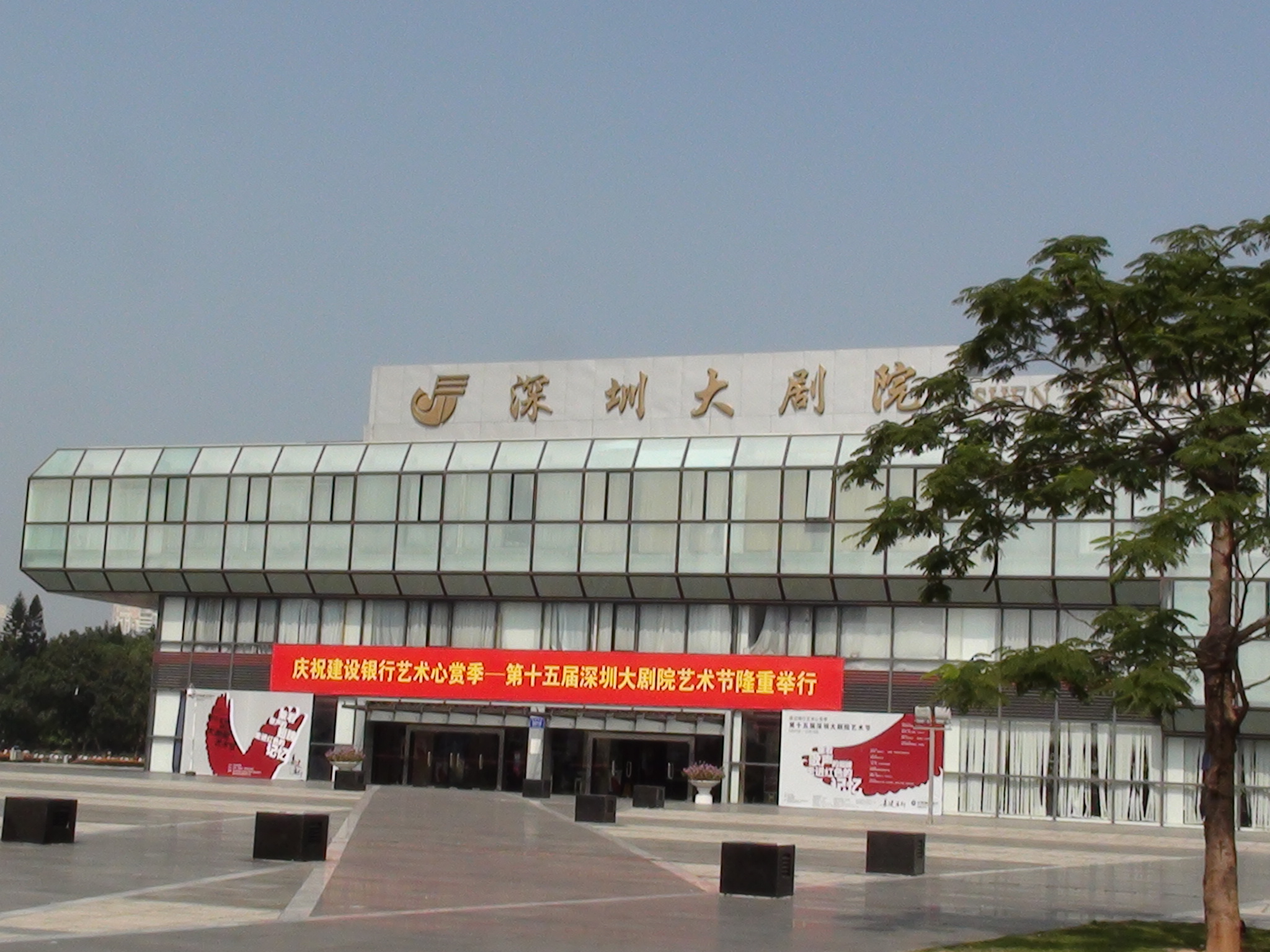
Shenzhen Amphitheater

== Literature ==
=== Novels ===
After the 1980s, a large number of foreigners entered Shenzhen. People's thinking is more avant-garde than that of mainland China. Some of the literary works are bold and open, such as Liu Xihong's short story "You Can't Change Me", Liu Xueqiang's and Lin Yuchun's prose collection "Red Dust and New Tide: An Updated Record of the Concepts of the Young People of Shenzhen", and "Shenzhen's Mystery of the Sphinx", which was awarded the National Award for Outstanding Reporting Literature of 1991-1992 and the LU Xun Prize of Guangdong Province, causing a sensation in China's literary circles.In 1993, SAR Literature was founded, and the works published reflected the urbanization tendency and characteristics of working literature. Writer Lanie Li's urban realistic work No One in the Wilderness: The Psychiatric Profile of a Mood Disorder Patient, which utilized the coherent medical history of a depressed patient to expound on the human sense of self-salvation from a literary perspective, received high praise. Working writer Liu Shuquan's "Temporary Workers in Shenzhen" is a piece of documentary literature that portrays the experiences and hardships of hundreds of thousands of working individuals in Shenzhen, with straightforward and vivid language. The book-length reportage "Men of Heaven and Earth", which depicts the changes in Nanling Village, is of a political theme and is highly regarded by officials. Other notable literary works, such as "The Mystery of Venus in Shenzhen," "Fierce Soldiers in the Northwest," and "The City of Youth: Shenzhen," have a high reputation in Shenzhen literary circles. In addition, some lyrical poems, such as "The Story of Spring" and "Into the New Era," possess a pronounced political atmosphere.

== Entertainment by city ==
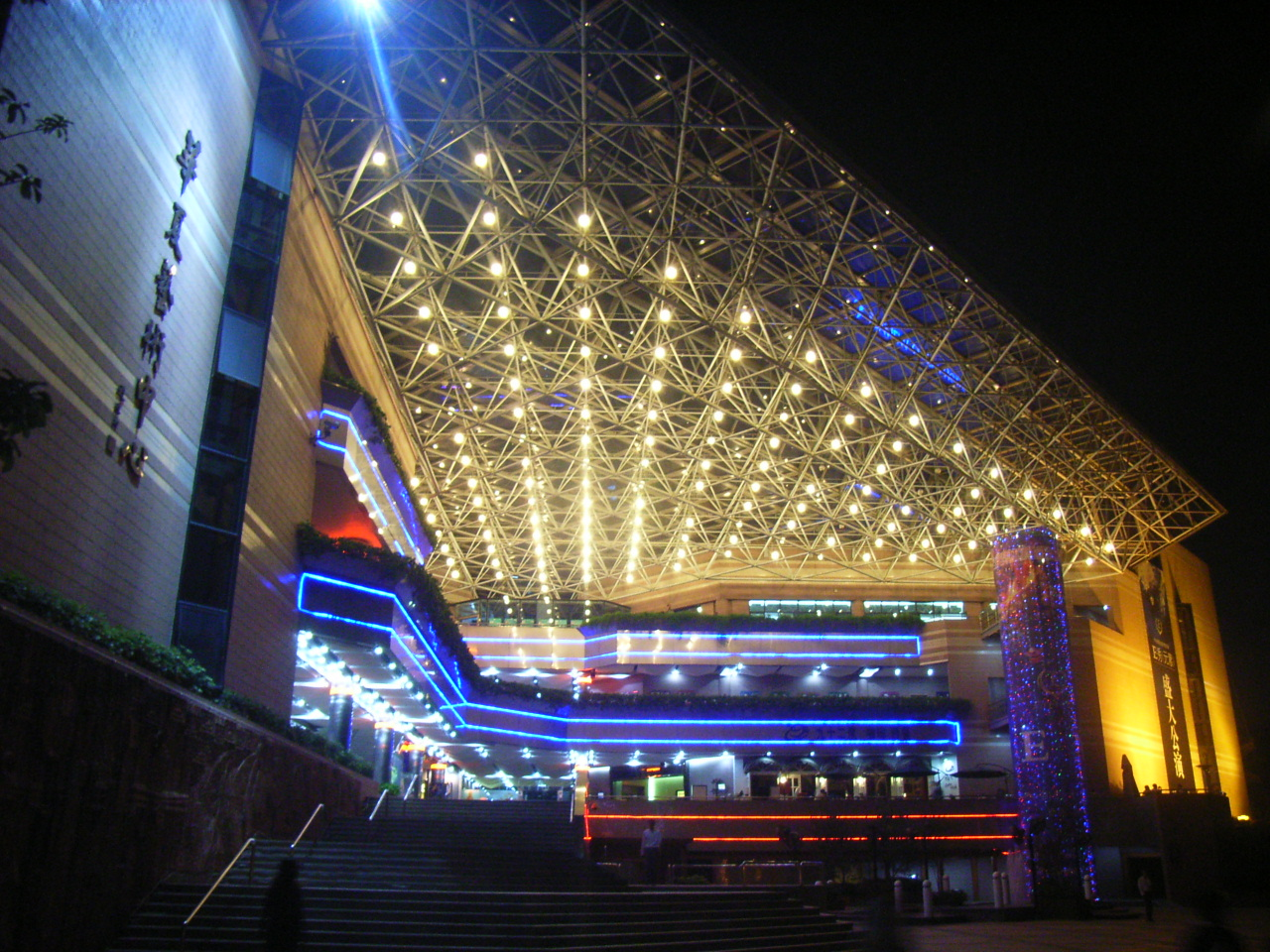
Huaxia Art City (OCT)

Shenzhen has a large number of entertainment venues, which are located in all administrative districts. The main film screening venues in Luohu District include Golden Harvest Cinema, New South China Cinema, and Sun Plaza Digital Film City. In Futian District, you can find Golden Shield Cinema and Futian Film Theatre. Nanshan District offers Huaxia Art Center, Nanshan Cinema, and High-tech Theatre of Science and Technology Park. Bao'an District has Xin'an Cinema and Theatre, among others. Comprehensive venues for film, television, and opera include the Shenzhen Theater, Shenzhen Grand Theater, Poly Theater, and others. Shenzhen Concert Hall is the largest music performance venue in the city, primarily hosting symphonic music performances. Designed by Japanese architect Shin Isozaki, the elegant and unique shape of the hall includes a concert hall, a small theater, and other ancillary facilities. The concert hall can accommodate up to 1,800 audience members.

=== Nightlife ===
Compared to other cities in mainland China, Shenzhen's nightlife is characterized by dance halls, street restaurants, bars, and urban villages known for their vibrant atmosphere and entertainment options. There are numerous nightclubs in all districts of the city, some of which offer sauna and massage services. The St. Paul's nightclub in Futian District is one of the more influential ones in the center of Shenzhen, and is known as a "super-large five-star integrated entertainment venue". The city's bars are concentrated in Shekou, Prince Edward Road, and Sea World. They can also be found around the Shenzhen Stadium and the Sunshine Hotel in Luohu District. These bars cater to different levels of consumption and are often frequented by foreigners. Some urban villages in Shenzhen, such as Xiasha Village and Shazui Village, have a thriving nightlife scene. These areas are home to numerous karaoke halls, leisure centers, food stores, and mini-markets. Even in the early hours of the morning, they are still crowded and lively, attracting a large number of Hongkongers as well as mainland Chinese.

== Historical sites ==
Although Shenzhen is a relatively new industrial and commercial city, it still boasts many historical monuments, some of which have been well preserved. Hohu residential area, Daitian Shijiu, Nantou ancient city, Dapeng Shijiu, and Dawan Shijiu are all monuments with deep cultural heritage. Among them, Dapeng Shijiu has been listed as a "national key cultural relics protection unit" and a "Chinese famous historical and cultural village". "Nantou Ancient City," also known as "Xin'an Ancient City," was built in 1394 during the Ming Dynasty. It was once the capital of Xin'an County. Existing historical relics in the ancient city include the Ancient City Gate, Guandi Temple, Dongguan Guild Hall, and the Coastal Defense Office, among others. Some traditional houses and ancestral shrine of the Qing Dynasty, which exhibit Lingnan vernacular characteristics, are also well-preserved in the city. Dapeng Fortress, also known as "Dapeng Guardian City," was constructed during the early years of the Ming Dynasty as a defense against Japanese wokou. It served as a military stronghold established by the imperial court and has a history spanning over 600 years. The buildings in the city still maintain the same pattern as they did in those days, with structures such as buildings, halls, rooms, wells, corridors, courtyards, etc. The plaques and other features have also remained unchanged.

The Shekou Peninsula in Nanshan District is home to several well-known historical relics, including the Chiwan Left Battery, Song Shaodi's Mausoleum, and a Mazu temple. Built in 1669, Chiwan Left Battery has a history of 342 years. It features well-preserved ancient cannons and the ruins of barracks from when the Qing army was stationed there. It is now a key cultural relics protection unit in Shenzhen. Chung Ying Street in Sha Tau Kok, Yantian District, is an old street known as "One Street, Two Systems," with a boundary stone in the center of the street jointly established by the Qing Dynasty government and the British government.

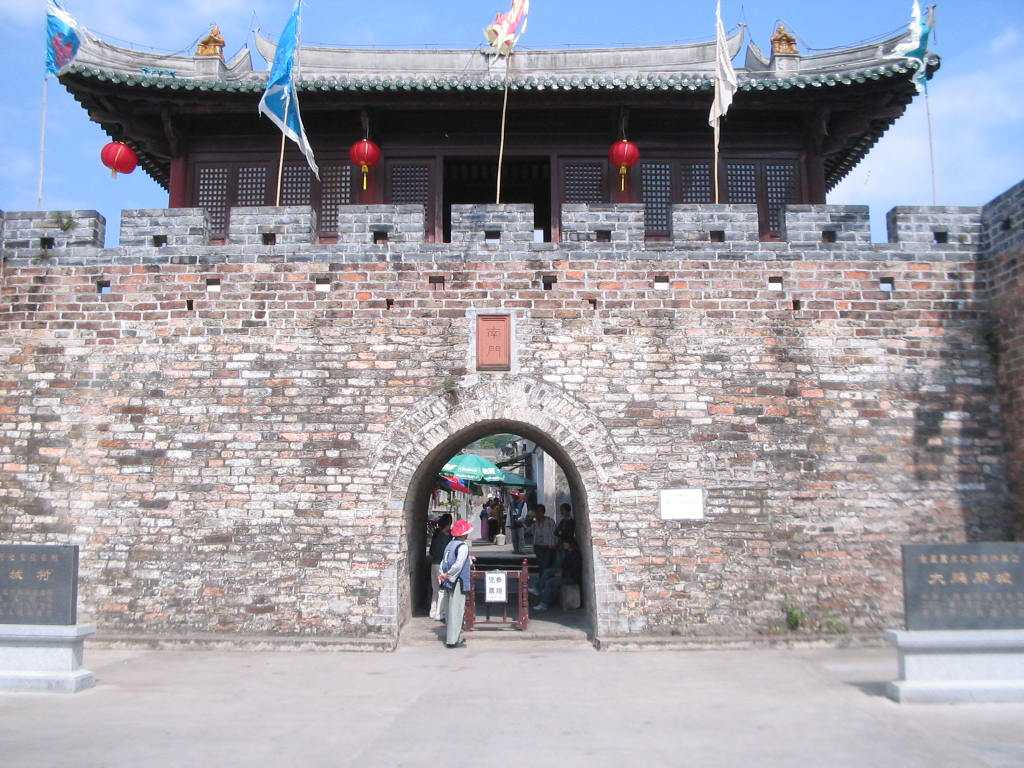
poort van dapengcheng

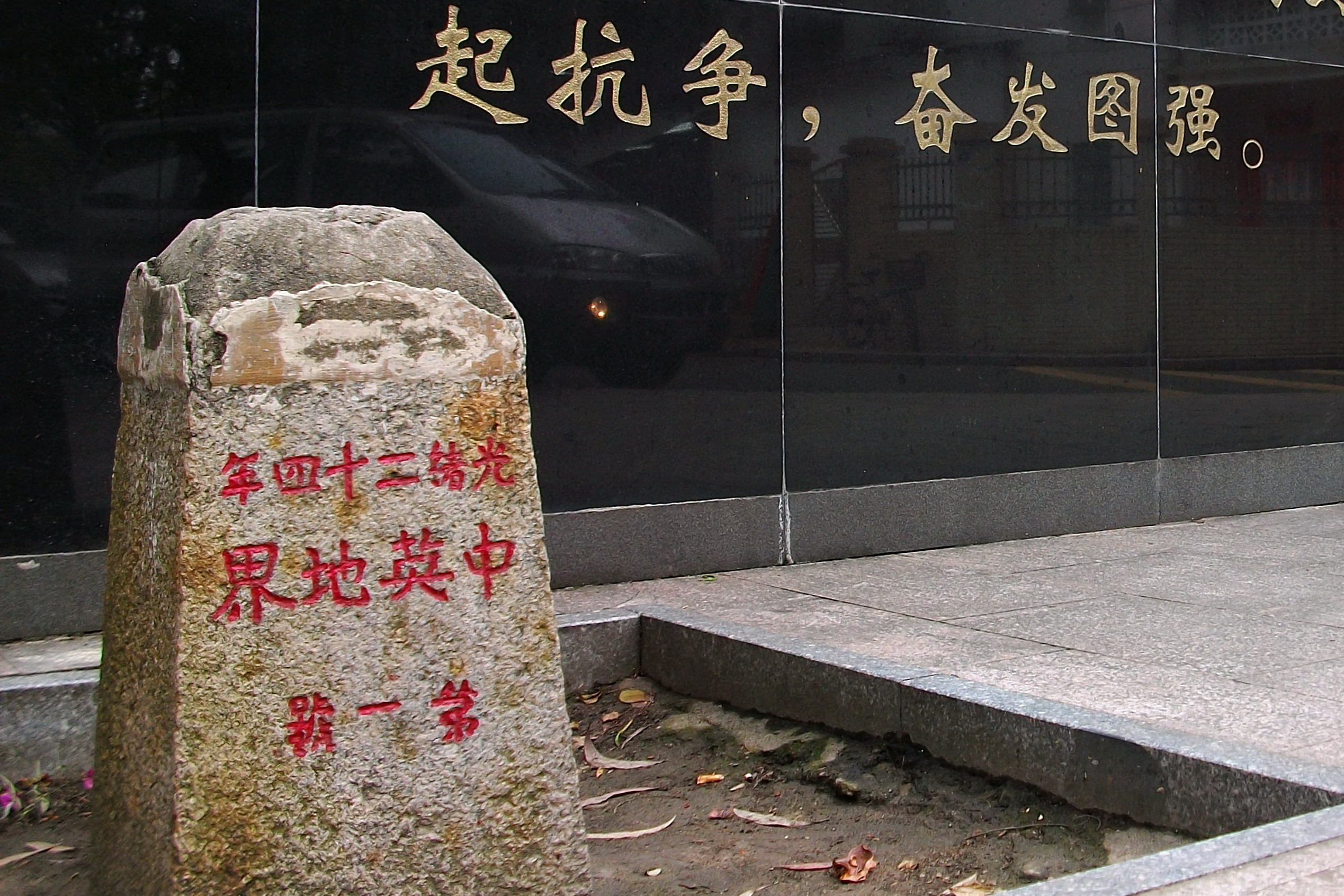
Boundary Stone No. 1, Chung Ying Street

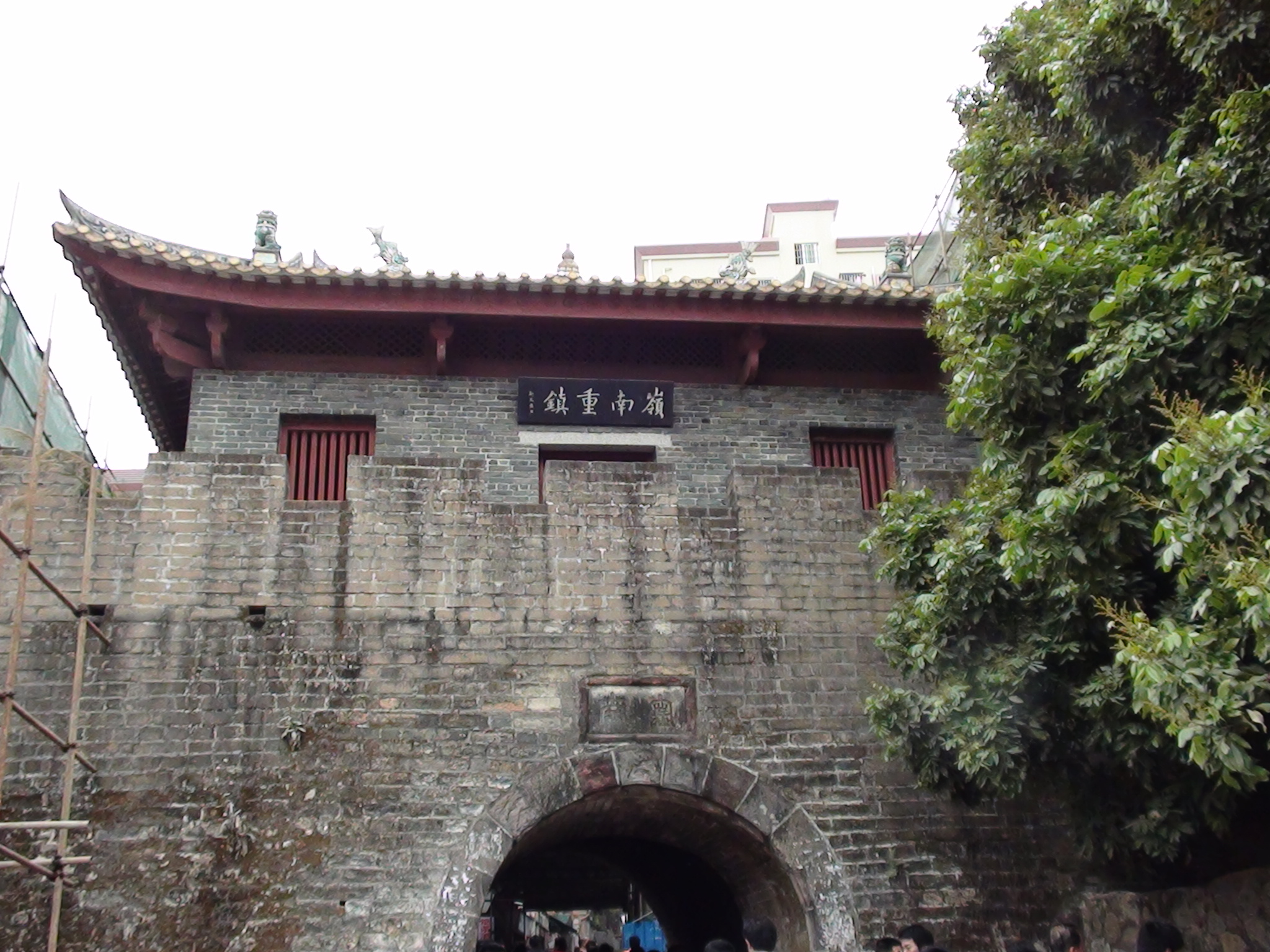
Nantou Ancient City (Xin'an Old City)

== Cultural practices of the local population ==
Shenzhen's local residents have rich cultural practices. In addition to traditional Chinese folk festivals, they also have unique local customs that have been passed down for a long time. Some examples include "Xixiang snatch cannon," "Fuyong dance dragons and lions," "Longgang crying marriage," "Pingshan play dip," and "Nanao dance grass dragon." Additionally, the women of Longgang Dapeng are known for their popular "hat to cover shame" tradition. "Crying marriage," "Pingshan dipping," and "Nanao dance grass dragon," etc. Longgang Dapeng women also fashion "cap cover shame." In addition, the aborigines of Shenzhen also adhere to a number of folk precepts, such as fasting to honor the gods on the first and fifteenth days for residents of Baoan District, Shajing, and Gongming. In Longgang District, Dapeng people practice avoiding evil spirits to meet the family and bathing and purifying the body, among other customs.

=== Habitat and dress ===
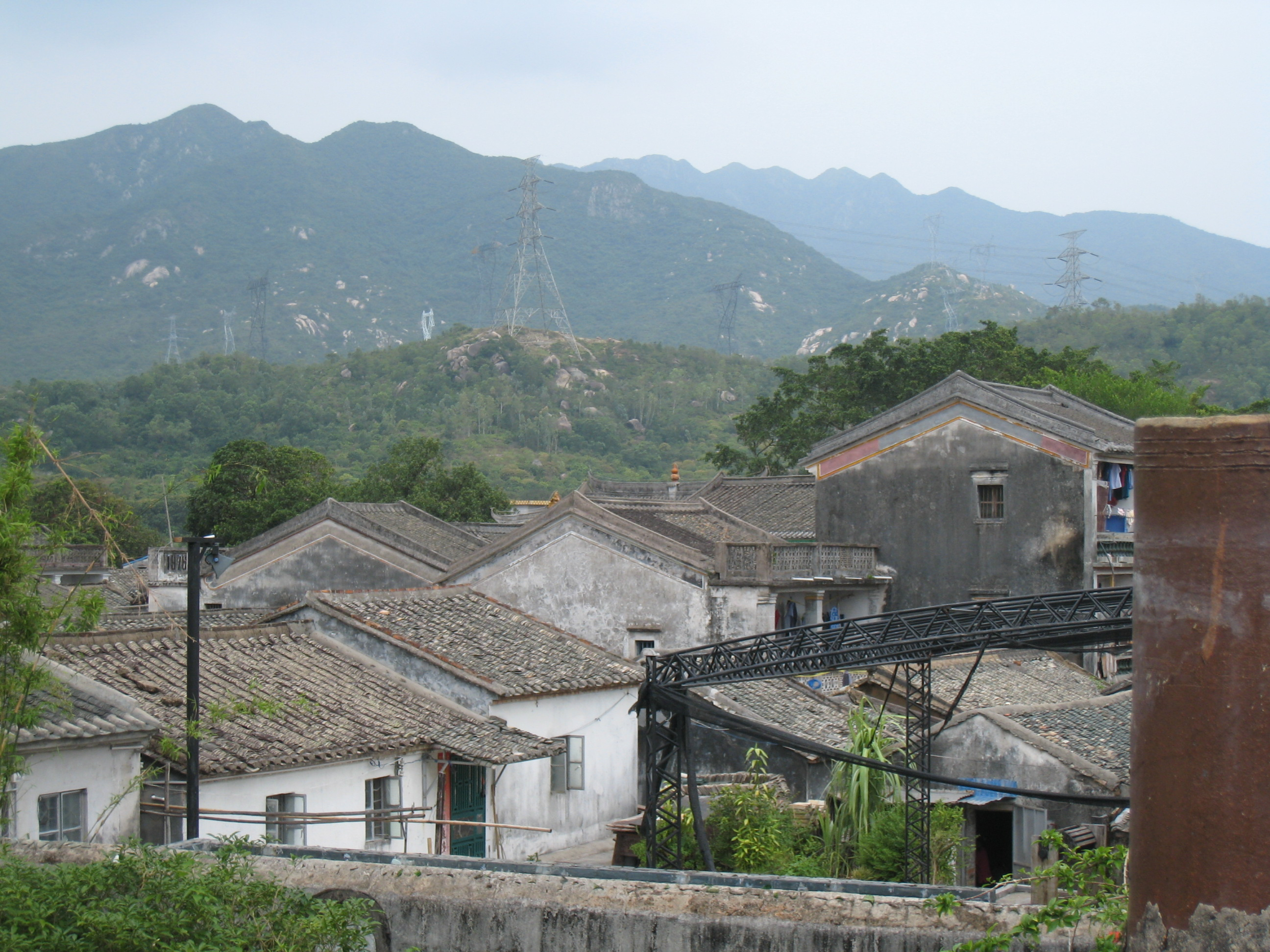
Old houses in Dapeng Township, Longgang District

In the early days, Shenzhen had a sparse population, and the architectural structure of the houses where the residents lived was relatively homogeneous. They were roughly categorized into "vertical houses" and "big qitou houses". Ordinary aborigines mostly used a vertical house structure, with the kitchen, patio, main hall, and bedrooms arranged in order from the main door. The more affluent ones would have an additional patio. The houses are primarily constructed using yellow mud, sand, and lime as building materials. Additionally, the lighting in these houses is poor. Hakka dwellings are mostly of the big qitou style, with halls, rooms, bedrooms, and kitchens on the outside and inside, respectively. Generally, rooms located against the wall will have a small window or bright tiles installed to allow light to enter. However, the overall lighting in the houses is also inadequate, and the building materials used are the same as those used by the indigenous people. Some Hakka people build houses according to the architectural style of their origin, mostly double-storey structures. The Dawanshi Residence, a representative example, has been listed as a key cultural relics protection unit in Shenzhen. As Shenzhen is located by the sea, fishermen who earn a living through fishing use their boats as their homes. Those with larger families and smaller boats will construct thatched huts on the higher parts of the coast. These huts are built using bamboo and wood as structural supports, with walls and roofs made of thatched grass. Unfortunately, these structures are easily destroyed by typhoons. After Shenzhen became a special economic zone, there have been significant changes in the architectural structure of houses. In the countryside, some houses have been built up to 5 or 6 floors, while old-fashioned houses have been phased out.

Before the founding of the People's Republic of China, the indigenous people of Shenzhen primarily wore plain clothes similar to those worn during the Tang Dynasty. These clothes were made from homemade "ten zhangwu" fabrics. Men's clothes had seven buttons and four pockets or five buttons and two pockets, and were open-chested; women's clothes had a large right button placket. Most women prefer to keep their hair in a bun, but Hakka women typically tie their hair around their heads, wear aprons, and don cool hats when they go out. Pants for men and women are the same, are wide pants, wide legs, but also Zhongshan suit, suits and other Western-style clothing, but mostly for students, teachers and government employees to wear. Men and women wore cloth shoes and embroidered shoes when they went out, and generally wore wooden clogs when they lived in the house. 1949 saw the prevalence of Zhongshan suits and youth suits, but the dresses in the countryside remained the same, with cotton, khaki, and tweed as the fabrics, and the shoes tended to be more varied, with cloth, rubber, synthetic, and leather shoes, with very few clogs being worn.

=== Folk traditions ===
==== Fuyong dragon and lion dance ====
Fuyong Subdistrict Dance is a folk activity that has been passed down for a long time in Fuyong Subdistrict of Bao'an District, which started during the Jiaqing period of the Qing Dynasty, and is mostly carried out during major festivals such as the Spring Festival, the Lantern Festival, Dragon Boat Festival, Chung Yeung Festival, etc. as well as weddings and celebrations, and is performed with dragon and lion dances to show the way of celebrations.

The Dragon Dance is usually performed by a dragon and lion team consisting of 40-50 members, marching with drums and music, shouting and shouting, and making a lot of noise. At present, Fuyong has a local dragon dance hall, in addition to the traditional festival dragon dance, some new enterprises will also invite the dragon dance team to dance dragon to celebrate the opening.

==== Xixiang cannon raiding ====
Baoan Xixiang Street's "Xixiang Grab Cannon" is a popular local custom aimed at praying for good luck, happiness, and well-being. "Cannon" is a double-sided glass mirror that is highly regarded by the local people. It features depictions of the Xuanwu, dragons, phoenixes, and other auspicious objects on both sides. The mirror symbolizes good fortune and prosperity, representing the concept of "dragon and phoenix auspiciousness."

By the third day of March, the local people gathered to seize the cannon site, drums, and cannons. At this time, organizers of the "grab the cannon" event will launch a large number of firecrackers into the sky. When the firecrackers fall, people will rush to grab them. Those who manage to grab the firecrackers can take them home to worship at the North Emperor statue, which is adorned with a double-sided glass mirror. On February 28 of the following year, the gun collectors will retrieve the "gun" from the previous year and bring it back to North Temple, marking the "return of the gun". On the third day of March, we will begin a new round of "snatch cannon".

==== Longgang wedding crying ====
"Longgang Crying Marriage" is a traditional custom of the Hakka people in rural Shenzhen, and the "Crying Marriage" in Longgang Pingshan is the most representative example. In accordance with local customs, before a woman gets married, there should be a "crying marriage period" of more than seven days. This extended period of crying results in redness around the eyes, which further enhances the beauty of the bride when the "crying period" is over.

The ceremony begins with the bridegroom meeting the father-in-law and mother-in-law. Afterward, the bride bids farewell to her parents with tears. Accompanied by the lively sounds of drums, gongs, and firecrackers, the bride then proceeds to the husband's home in a joyous atmosphere, carried on a sedan chair. Nowadays, the tradition of "crying marriage" has become a thing of the past, and modern Hakka people rarely experience the phenomenon of "crying marriage".

== Dietary features ==
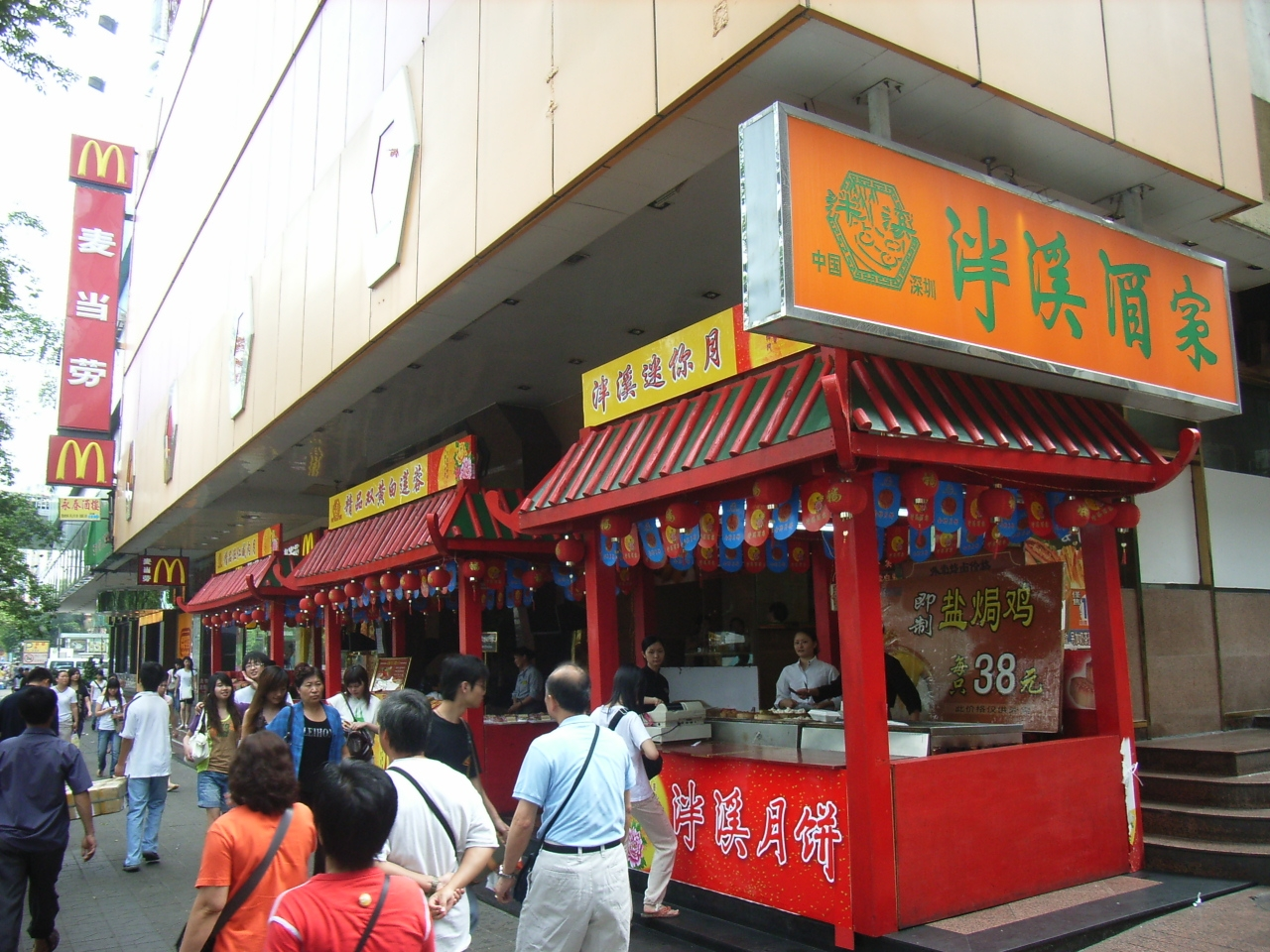
A restaurant specializing in Cantonese cuisine and the adjacent McDonald's in Luohu District

Shenzhen cuisine originally belonged to Cantonese cuisine, but with the influx of a large number of foreigners, the food culture has become very diverse. It now offers a wide variety of dishes, representing not only the main domestic Chinese cuisine but also many imported foreign food brands. In the early days, Chinese cuisine was dominated by Cantonese, Hakka cuisine, and Teochew cuisines from Guangdong province. In larger Cantonese restaurants, there is usually a specialty morning tea service that is enjoyed not only by Shenzhen locals but also by many foreigners who are eager to taste this unique refreshment. The influx of expatriates has also brought with it their own cuisines, most of which are on the spicy side, such as Hunan cuisine, Sichuan cuisine, and Chongqing hot pot, etc. However, to accommodate the lighter eating preferences of diners in Guangdong and Hong Kong, expatriates have also incorporated mildly spiced or non-spicy flavors into their dishes. However, if not explicitly instructed to add chili peppers, these restaurants will still include them in their cooking.

== Cultural Industry and Cultural Exposition ==
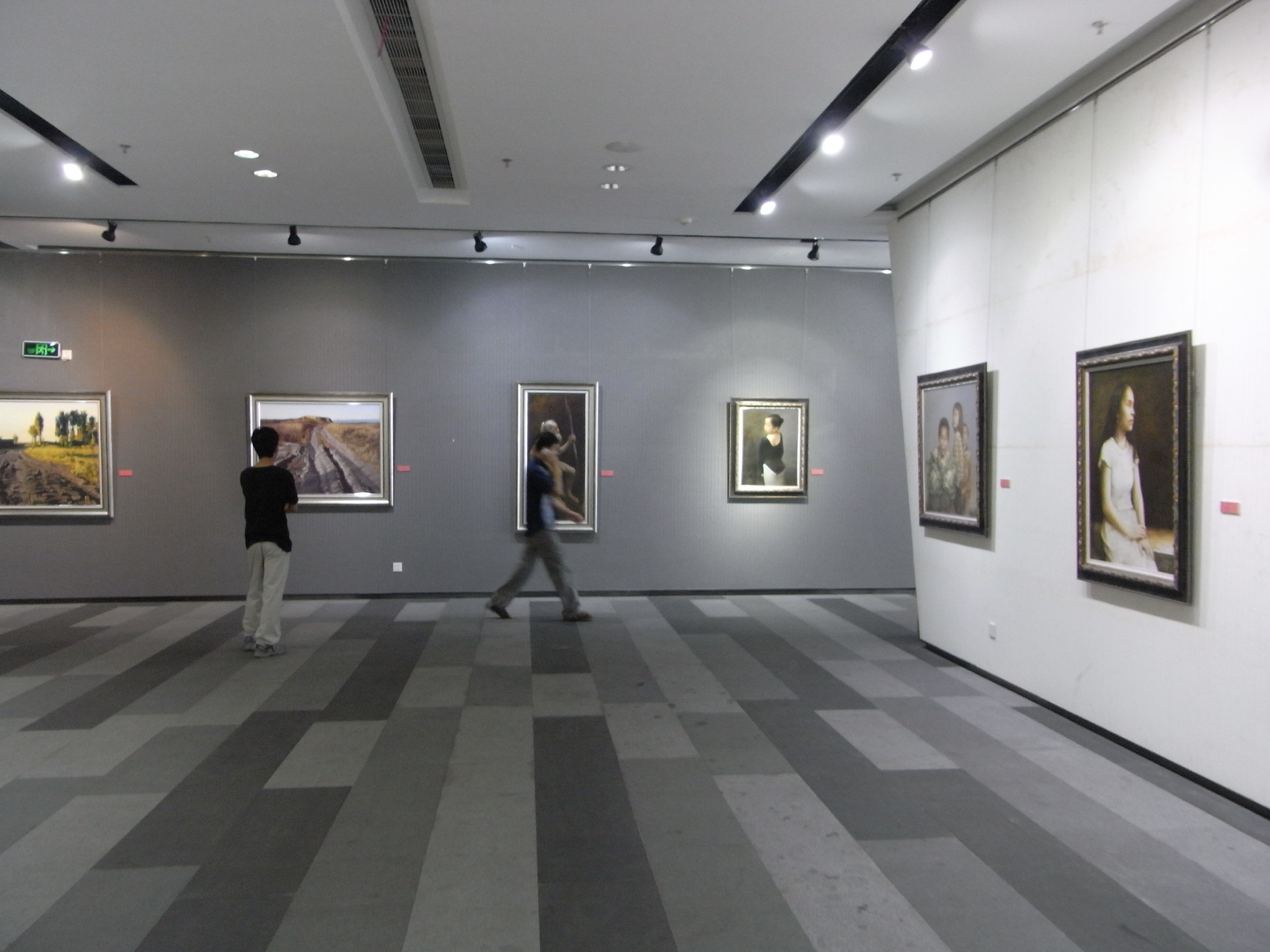
Gallery in Dafen Oil Painting Village

Shenzhen is one of the major cities for handicraft manufacturing in China. With over 1,900 handicraft manufacturers and more than 200,000 practitioners, it boasts the largest handicraft production base in the country. Shenzhen holds a leading position in the design and production of water products, which is an emerging cultural industry in the city. Crafts have a wide range of categories and varieties. Sculpture encompasses various materials such as metal, resin, crystal, colored glaze, and other crafts. Art and landscape include craft paintings, bamboo and wood art, artificial plants and flowers, and more. Traditional handmade crafts consist of embroidery, ceramics, leather crafts, and the simulation of antiques, among others. Additionally, there is a wide range of electronic handicrafts, simulation modeling, silver and gold jewelry handicrafts, tourist souvenirs, and stationery handicrafts produced.

Dafen Oil Painting Village is the hub of the oil painting industry in Shenzhen. It serves as a center for oil painting creation, wholesaling, and customization. The village attracts numerous domestic and foreign merchants who come here to negotiate and make purchases. Additionally, the oil painting products from Dafen are exported to various countries in Asia, Africa, America, and Europe. The village of Dafen has become a hub for oil painting, attracting a large number of talented artists. The oil painting industry is thriving, and it has had a significant impact on the overall economy of Dafen Village. There is also a "Dafen Art Museum" in the village, which is the only art museum in the city dedicated to the village's art. Dafen oil painting is a culturally distinctive industry in Shenzhen and has a significant influence throughout the country.

The full name of the "Cultural Fair" is the "China (Shenzhen) International Cultural Industries Fair," which is the only national cultural industry fair in China. The Cultural Fair was first held from November 18 to 22, 2004. It takes place once a year for a four-day period. The main venue is set up at the Shenzhen Convention and Exhibition Center, with additional sub-venues including the Dafen Oil Painting Village. The main highlights of the fair include the "exposition and trade", "cultural industry forum", and "awards" events. More than 700 enterprises from over 50 countries and regions, both in China and abroad, participated in the first Cultural Fair. The event generated a turnover (including intentional turnover) of 35.69 billion RMB and attracted over 470,000 participants.
