= Shenzhen Buji Church =

Shenzhen Buji Church 深圳布吉基督教堂
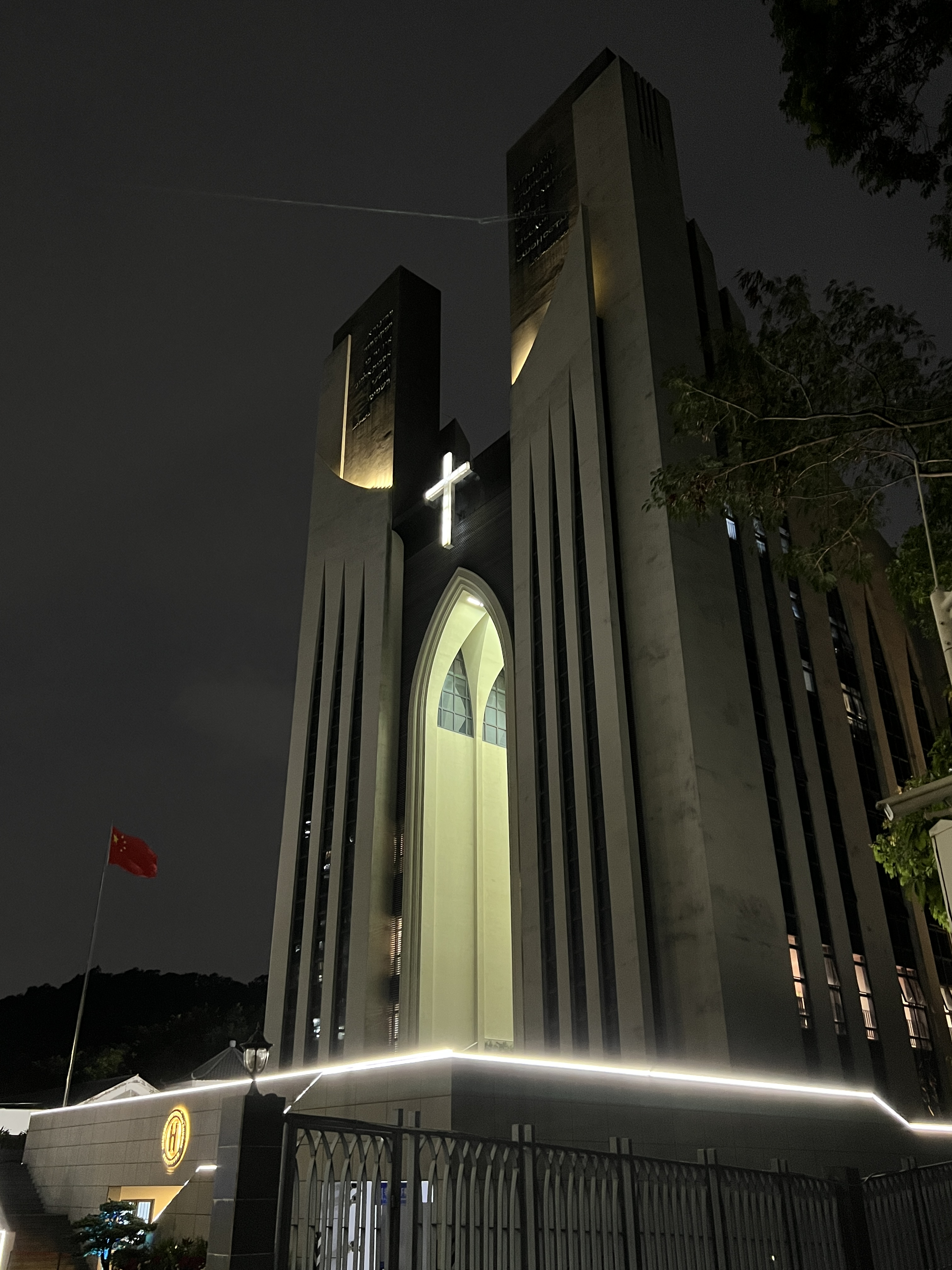
- Address: Buji Subdistrict, Longgang District, Shenzhen, Guangdong, China
- Country: China
- Denomination: Protestantism

History
- Founded: 1854

Architecture
- Architectural type: Church
- Style: Postmodernism
- Years built: 2008–2017 (current church)
- Completed: 2017

Specifications
- Capacity: 1,500
- Materials: Reinforced concrete with white exterior finishes

Administration
- Diocese: Under the Protestant Three-Self Patriotic Movement and China Christian Council in Shenzhen

Shenzhen Buji Church is a Protestant church located in Buji Subdistrict, Longgang District, Shenzhen, Guangdong, China. It was first established in 1854, and the present main building was completed in 2017.

== History ==
The history of Christian Buji Church dates back to 1852 (the second year of the Xianfeng era), when missionaries Samuel Hanspach and Rudolf Lechler of the Swiss Basel Mission came to the Buji area to evangelize and set up a preaching station. In 1854, Lechler built the Lilang Gospel Hall in Lilang Village; it was completed the following year and is regarded as the first Protestant gospel hall in inland China. He also founded the Leyu Theological Seminary.

In 1901 (the 27th year of the Guangxu era), local believer Ling Qilian led the construction of the Buji Gospel Hall (the present "old church") in Buji Old Market Village, which was completed the next year. Worship services ceased in 1948, and the building was subsequently used as a hospital and warehouse, among other functions. It was returned to the church in 1985, approved as a temporary meeting point in 1994, and recognized as an official religious venue in 1996. Due to aging conditions, a decision was made at the end of the 20th century to relocate and rebuild. The new church was first groundbreaking in 2008 and was officially opened in 2017.

== Architecture ==
The new church completed in 2017 occupies a site of 3,202.33 square meters, with a total floor area of 8,417.82 square meters. The main sanctuary seats 1,500, and the auxiliary hall seats 500. The design employs a contrast between white exterior walls and dark recessed pointed-arch grooves to evoke Gothic motifs; inside, elongated skylights produce a dramatic ribbon of top lighting.
