= Dafen station =

Station on the Shenzhen Metro in China

Dafen 大芬
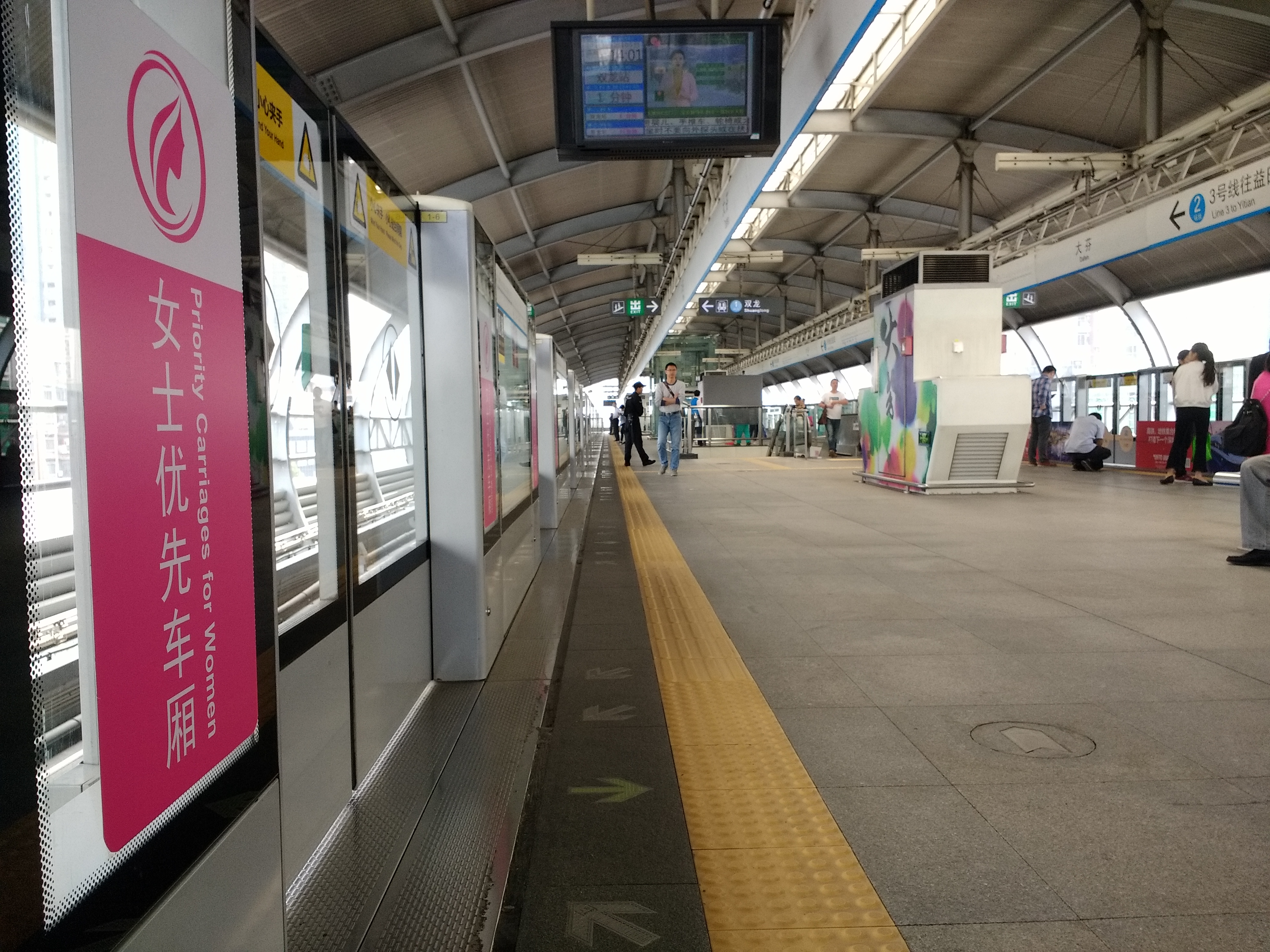
- Platform

General information
- Location: Longgang District, Shenzhen, Guangdong; China
- Coordinates: 22°36′50″N 114°8′18″E
- Operator: Shenzhen Metro Line 3 Operations
- Line: Line 3
- Platforms: 2 (1 island platform)
- Tracks: 2

Construction
- Structure type: Elevated
- Accessible: Yes

History
- Opened: 28 December 2010 (15 years ago)

Services
Preceding station	Shenzhen Metro	Following station
Danzhutou towards Pingdi Liulian	Line 3	Mumianwan towards Futian Bonded Area
Location

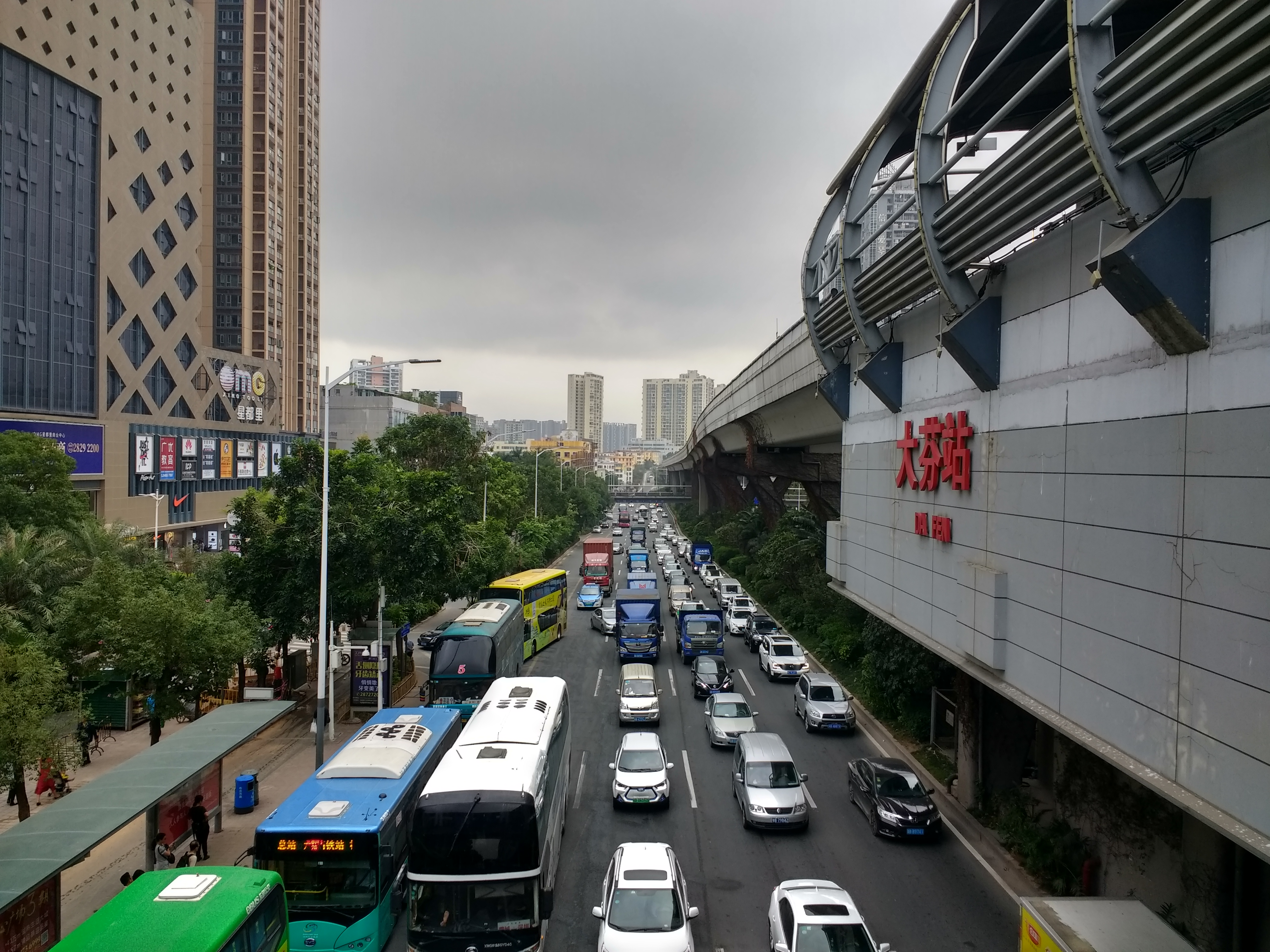
Station exterior

Dafen station (Chinese: 大芬站; pinyin: Dàfēn Zhàn; Jyutping: daai6 fan1 zaam6) is a station on Line 3 of the Shenzhen Metro. It opened on 28 December 2010. It is located on Shenhui Road near Kangda'er Garden and Dafen Oil Painting Village.

== Station layout ==
3F; Platforms	Platform 2	3 towards Futian Bonded Area (Mumianwan)
3F; Platforms	Island platform, doors will open on the left
3F; Platforms	Platform	3 towards Pingdi Liulian (Danzhutou)
2F; Concourse	Lobby	Ticket Machines, Customer Service, Shops, Vending Machines
G	-	Exits A & C

== Exits ==
Exit		Destination
Exit A	A	Longgang Blvd (S), Zhongyi Road, Dongda Street, Walmart
Exit A	A1	Shenhui Road (S), East Avenue, Zhongcui Road, Zhongyi Road
Exit A	A2	Dafen Oil Painting Village, Shenhui Road (S), Dongda Street
Exit C		Shenhui Road (N), Lilang Road, Bulan Road

== See also ==
- Dafen Village
