= Picanova =

German photo printing and framing company

Picanova GmbH
- Industry: Manufacturing
- Founded: 2006; 20 years ago
- Founders: Daniel and Philipp Mühlbauer
- Headquarters: Cologne, Germany
- Area served: Worldwide
- Operating income: EUR 183 million (2020)
- Net income: 12,5 Millionen Euro EBITDA (2020)
- Number of employees: 600 (2017)
- Website: company.picanova.com

Picanova is a German company providing photo printing and framing services. It is one of the largest producers of custom wall decorations in the world, with headquarters in Cologne.

== History ==
In 2004, brothers Daniel and Philipp Mühlbauer from Cologne began to work on an idea for wall decorations. They found business partners in Dafen Village near Shenzhen, famous for the mass production of replicas of oil paintings. However, realizing that the market was already saturated, they decided to turn to people who wanted to have their own pictures on their walls. They founded Picanova in 2006.

In 2008, the DuMont publishing house became a partner. Ventech, a French venture capital firm, announced in 2013 that it invested several million euros in Picanova. Picanova's sales in 2014 amounted to 17.9 million euros, with a profit of EUR 1.1 million. The companies United Arts (myfoto), fotofox and Bestcanvas became part of Picanova.

The company received the 2015 Eco Internet Award from the government of North Rhine-Westphalia for special achievements in digital economy.

In March 2017, the company had 600 employees worldwide and managed 40 online shops in 25 countries. It produced up to 100,000 products per day.

== Production and offer ==
The production plants are in four locations: Szczecin in Poland; Miami and Phoenix for the American market; and a wood factory in Riga for canvas frames and other wooden items.

Picanova first created an online platform, "mein Bild.de", which made it possible for users to print their own photos on canvasses to be hung on the wall. With time, their offer widened to include not only surfaces and frames of different materials, but also pillows, mobile phone covers, and various other objects to be printed on. Services are offered under different domains in different countries. For example, the French site is called "photo-sur-toile.fr".

Picanova's platforms "Creame" and "This is a Limited Edition" cooperate with artists whose illustrations customers can print. The company has also developed a 3D scanner allowing customers to physically capture and print small figures. Picanova's platform "Monetize.ly" is intended for celebrities from sports, film, show business, and the Internet. They can upload their pictures for their fans to print them.

The Picanova group includes Yincool, a Chinese fashion company. Since 2017, Picanova has been the general sponsor of Yincool Fashion Weekend, which gathers European and Asian designers in Jūrmala, Latvia.

Picanova provide a white-labeling photo service for supermarket giants Aldi and Lidl.
