= Buji Subdistrict =

Subdistrict of Longgang District, Shenzhen, China

Coordinates: 22.6083°N 114.1292°E

Buji Subdistrict 布吉街道
- Subdistrict
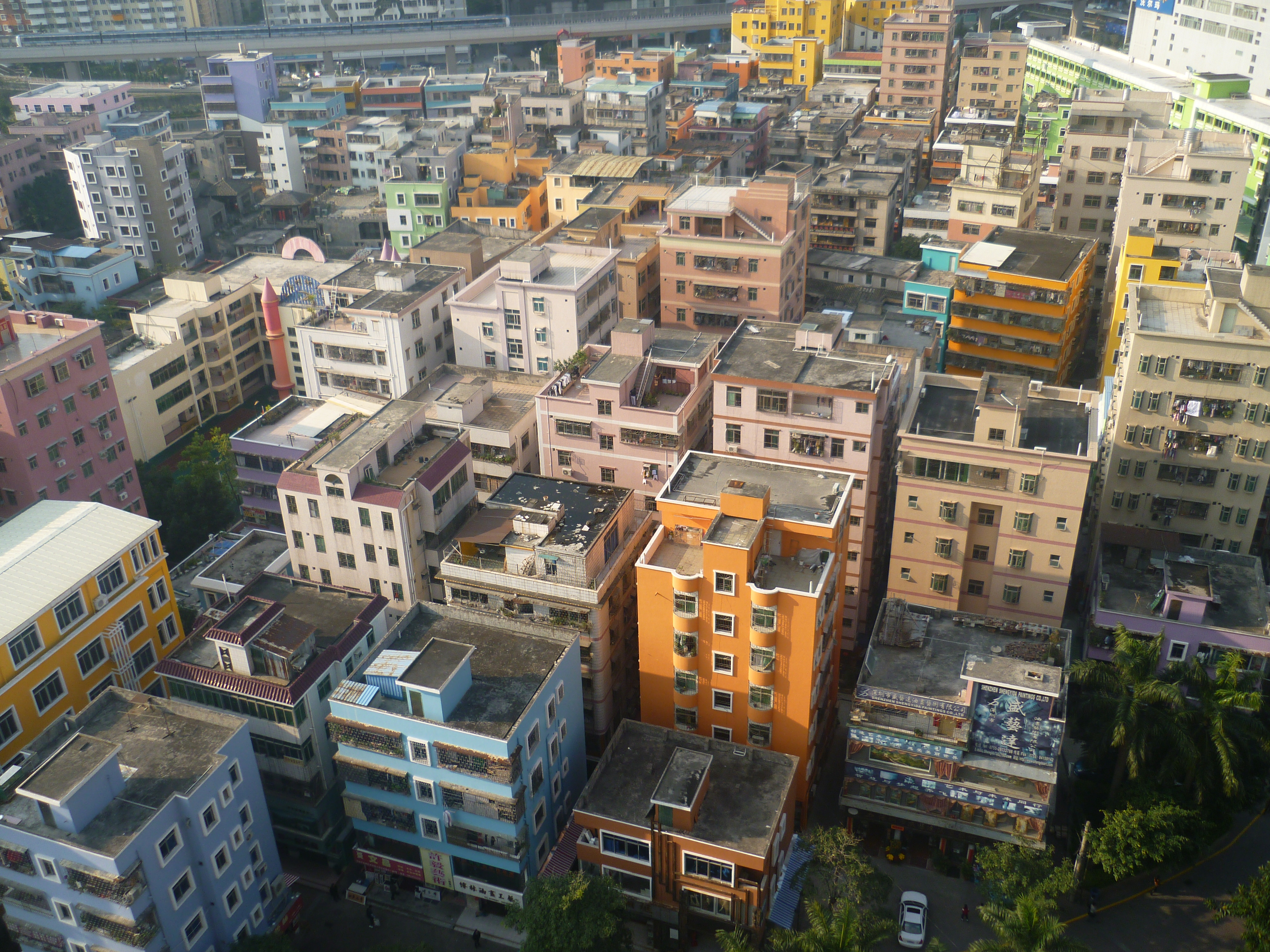
- An aerial view of Dafen Village
- Interactive map of Buji Subdistrict
- Country: China
- Province: Guangdong
- Prefecture-level city: Shenzhen
- District: Longgang District

Area
  - Total: 11.64 km^{2} (4.49 sq mi)

Population (2022)
  - Total: 573,000
  - Density: 49,200/km^{2} (127,000/sq mi)

Buji Subdistrict (Chinese: 布吉街道; pinyin: Bùjí Jiēdào) is a subdistrict of Longgang District, Shenzhen, Guangdong, China. Located in the northeast part of Shenzhen, it is served by four metro stations and is home to the city's eastern train station, Shenzhen East railway station. The subdistrict spans an area of 11.64 square kilometres (4.49 mi^{2}), and has a population of about 573,000, as of a 2023 government publication. Buji Subdistrict is home to Dafen Village, a major art center known for its production of fake and replica paintings of famous works.

== History ==
It was formerly part of Buji Town before August 26, 2004.

In December 2012, the newly-rebuilt Shenzhen East railway station was opened.

== Geography ==
Buji Subdistrict is located within the western portion of Longgang District, in Shenzhen. The subdistrict is bordered by Luohu District to the south. Buji Subdistrict lies 4 kilometres (2.5 mi) from the urban core of Shenzhen and 8 kilometres (5.0 mi) from the New Territories of Hong Kong. The Buji River runs through the subdistrict.

== Administrative divisions ==
Buji Subdistrict administers the following 17 residential communities (Chinese: 社区; pinyin: shèqū):

- Bujiwei Community (Chinese: 布吉圩社区)
- Changlong Community (Chinese: 长龙社区)
- Longling Community (Chinese: 龙岭社区)
- Dexing Community (Chinese: 德兴社区)
- Longzhu Community (Chinese: 龙珠社区)
- Guozhan Community (Chinese: 国展社区)
- Maoye Community (Chinese: 茂业社区)
- Fenghuang Community (Chinese: 凤凰社区)
- Luogang Community (Chinese: 罗岗社区)
- Jinpai Community (Chinese: 金排社区)
- Buji Community (Chinese: 布吉社区)
- Nansan Community (Chinese: 南三社区)
- Dafen Community (Chinese: 大芬社区)
- Dongfangbandao Community (Chinese: 东方半岛社区)
- Wenjing Community (Chinese: 文景社区)
- Mumianwan Community (Chinese: 木棉湾社区)
- Keyuan Community (Chinese: 可园社区)

== Major communities ==
- Gui Fang Yuan
- Dafen Village
- COLI Greenery Villas
- Music Life Garden

== Education ==
Per a 2023 government publication, there are 24 schools (13 of which are private), and 59 kindergartens in Buji Subdistrict.

== Health ==
Per a 2023 government publication, there are 5 hospitals (4 of which are private) and 17 health clinics in Buji Subdistrict.

== Transportation ==
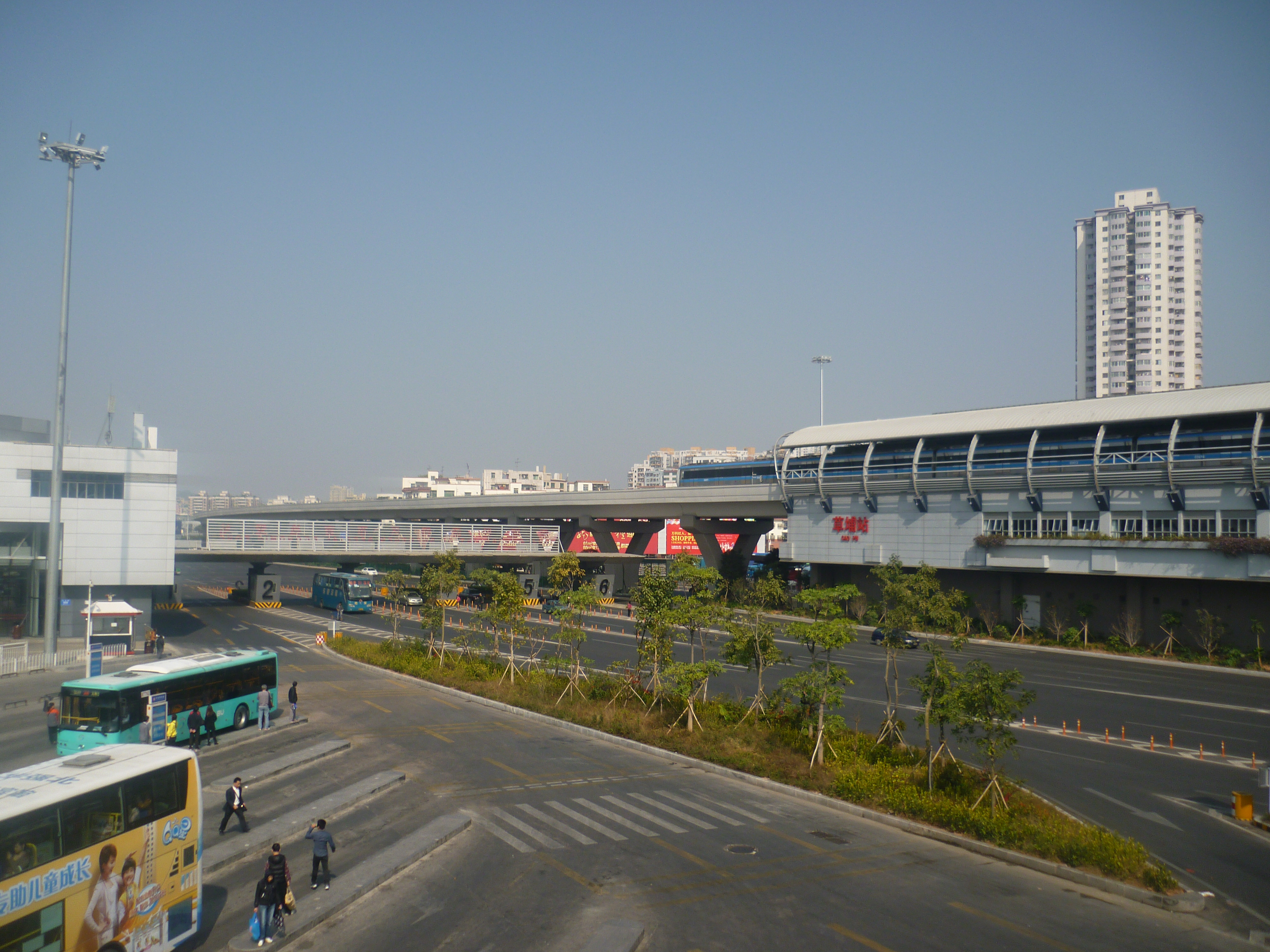
A view of Longgang Boulevard

Buji Subdistrict is served by one train station, numerous metro lines, and numerous expressways.

=== Railway station ===
- Shenzhen East railway station

=== Metro stations ===
- Buji station (3 • 5 • 14)
- Mumianwan station (3)
- Dafen station (3)
- Danzhutou station (3)

=== Expressways ===
- Jihe Expressway
- Shuiguan Expressway
- Qingping Expressway
- Nanping Expressway

=== Major roads ===
- Longgang Boulevard
- Bulong Road
