= Mumianwan station =

Metro station in Shenzhen, China

Mumianwan 木棉湾
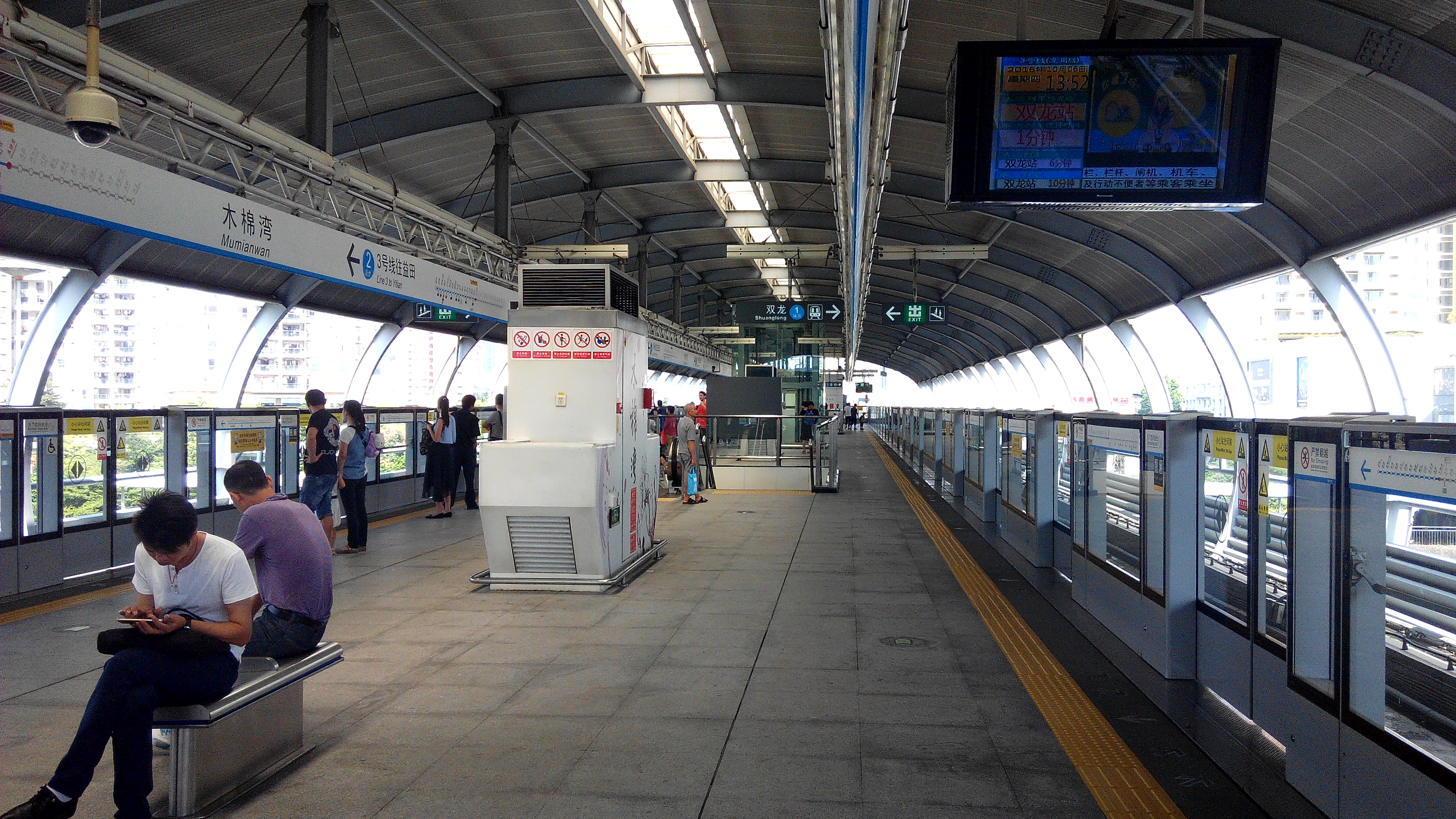
- Platform

General information
- Location: Longgang District, Shenzhen, Guangdong; China
- Coordinates: 22°36′24″N 114°7′48″E
- Operated by: Shenzhen Metro Line 3 Operations
- Line: Line 3
- Platforms: 2 (1 island platform)
- Tracks: 2

Construction
- Structure type: Elevated
- Accessible: Yes

History
- Opened: 28 December 2010 (15 years ago)

Services
Preceding station	Shenzhen Metro	Following station
Dafen towards Pingdi Liulian	Line 3	Buji towards Futian Bonded Area
Location

Mumianwan station (Chinese: 木棉湾站; lit. 'Kapok Bay station') is a station on Line 3 of the Shenzhen Metro (formerly known as the Longgang Line). It was opened on 28 December 2010.

A study published in 2020 found that traffic in both directions from Mumianwan station tends to be congested during peak hours.

== Station layout ==
3F; Platforms	Platform	3 towards Futian Bonded Area (Buji)
3F; Platforms	Island platform, doors will open on the left
3F; Platforms	Platform	3 towards Pingdi Liulian (Dafen)
2F; Concourse	Lobby	Ticket Machines, Customer Service, Shops, Vending Machines
G	-	Exits B-D

== Exits ==
Exit		Destination
Exit B	B1	Shenhui Road (S), Longgang Boulevard (S), Mumian Road, Mumianwancun, Longgang Blvd No.1 Estate
Exit B	B2	Shenhui Road (S), China Customs, Caixing Building, Maoye Calligraphy and Painting Market
Exit C		Shenhui Road (N), Longgang Boulevard (N), Buji Township Apartment, A. Best, Central Garden, Haojing Mingyuan
Exit D		Longgang Blvd (N), Jizheng Road, Zhongxing Road, Shenzhen Zhonghai Hospital, Buji Taxation Office, Dashiji Garden, Chengxin Huating, Buji Rainbow Department Store
