= COLI Greenery Villas =

Housing district in Shenzhen, China

Coordinates: 22.623256°N 114.109269°E

COLI Greenery Villas (中海怡翠山庄 Zhōnghǎi Yícuì Shānzhuāng), also called COLI Greenery (中海怡翠 Zhōnghǎi Yícuì) for short, located at Bulong Road, Buji Sub-district, Longgang District, Shenzhen City, Guangdong Province, People's Republic of China, is a real estate project of China Overseas Real Estate (Shenzhen) Limited. It covers about 280,000 square metres (69 acres) and offers 3207 housing units which can hold more than 10000 people. It began to be on sale on July 8, 1997 and was checked in on March 3, 2002.

== Feature ==
- Hillside view project with low plot ratio.
- With a natural valley - Greenery Valley inside.
- Each ground floor unit has private gardens and each garret unit has a roof garden.

== Transportation ==
=== Bus ===
- Front gate: COLI Greenery Villas Stop / Station
- Northwest gate: Music Life Garden Stop
- Northeast gate: Sanlian Village Station

=== Metro ===
- Shangshuijing Station, Huanzhong Line

== News event ==
=== Fight for the Rebuilding of Shangshuijing Metro Station ===
Shangshuijing Metro Station once has been canceled. Residents from COLI Greenery Villas, Music Life Garden and Lakewood Garden showed their counterview to the local government and they finally achieved their goal of rebuilding the metro station.

== Neighbourhood ==
- Shenzhen Metro
  - Huanzhong Line
    - Shangshuijing Station
- Sanlian Crystal & Jade Culture Village
- Music Life Garden
- Lakehood Garden
- Red Star Macalline Buji Branch
- Bulong Road
- Shuiguan Highway
