= Danzhutou station =

Metro station in Shenzhen, Guangdong, China

Danzhutou 丹竹头
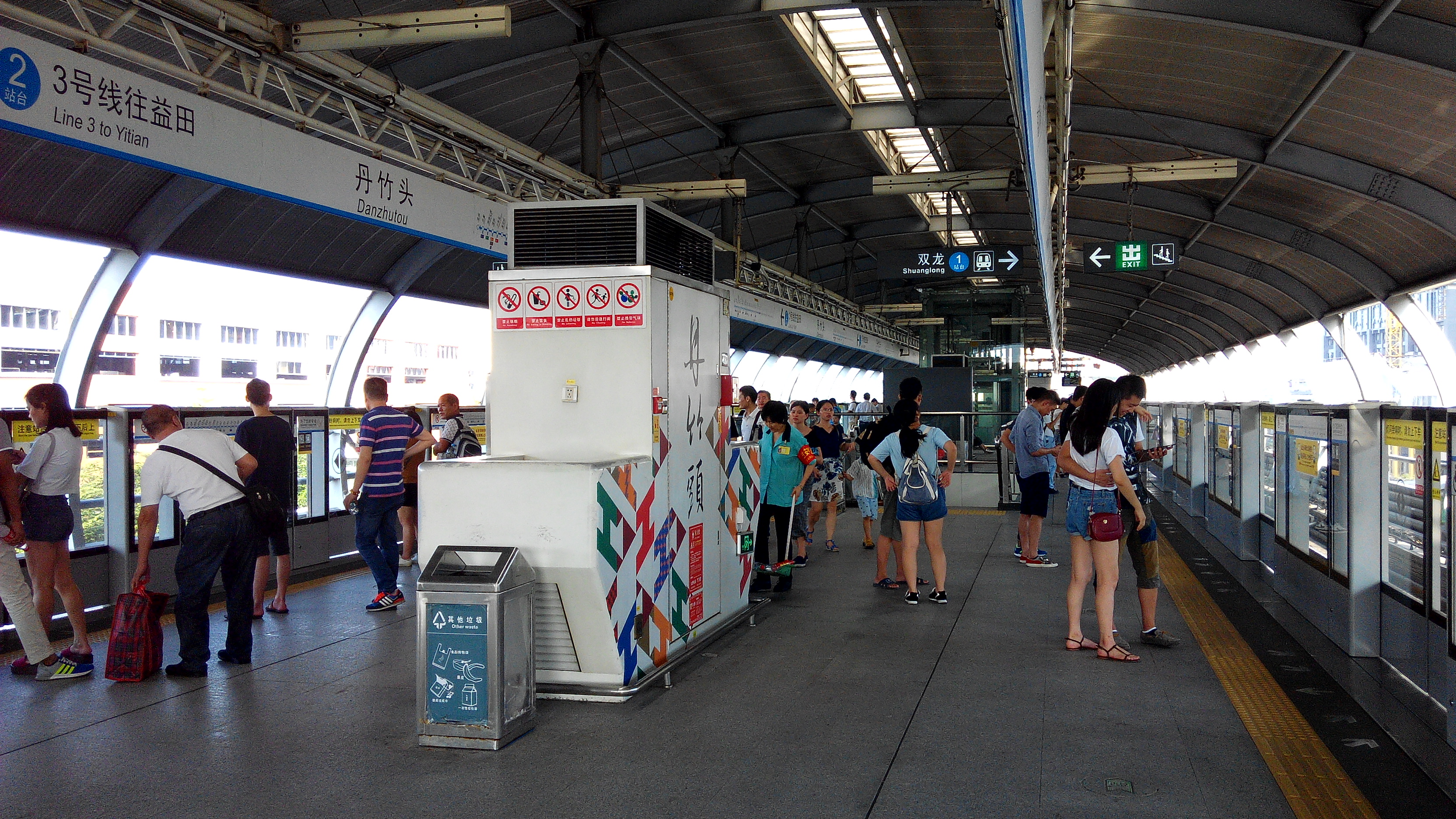
- Platform

General information
- Location: Longgang District, Shenzhen, Guangdong; China
- Coordinates: 22°37′11″N 114°8′52″E
- Operator: Shenzhen Metro Line 3 Operations
- Line: Line 3
- Platforms: 2 (1 island platform)
- Tracks: 2

Construction
- Structure type: Elevated
- Accessible: Yes

History
- Opened: 28 December 2010 (15 years ago)

Services
Preceding station	Shenzhen Metro	Following station
Liuyue towards Pingdi Liulian	Line 3	Dafen towards Futian Bonded Area
Location

Danzhutou station (Chinese: 丹竹头站; pinyin: Dānzhútóu Zhàn) is a station of Line 3, Shenzhen Metro. It opened on 28 December 2010. It is located in Shenhui Road near Danzhutou Village.

== Station layout ==
3F; Platforms	Platform	3 towards Futian Bonded Area (Dafen)
3F; Platforms	Island platform, doors will open on the left
3F; Platforms	Platform	3 towards Pingdi Liulian (Liuyue)
2F; Concourse	Lobby	Ticket Machines, Customer Service, Shops, Vending Machines
G	-	Exits A, C & D

== Exits ==
Exit	Destination
Exit A	Shenhui Road (S), Longgang Boulevard (S), Huangjin North Boulevard
Exit C	Shenhui Road (N), Longgang Boulevard (N), Danzhu Main Road
Exit D	Shenhui Road (N), Baoguan Road
