= Fuping station =

Shenzhen Metro Line 3 station

Fuping 富坪
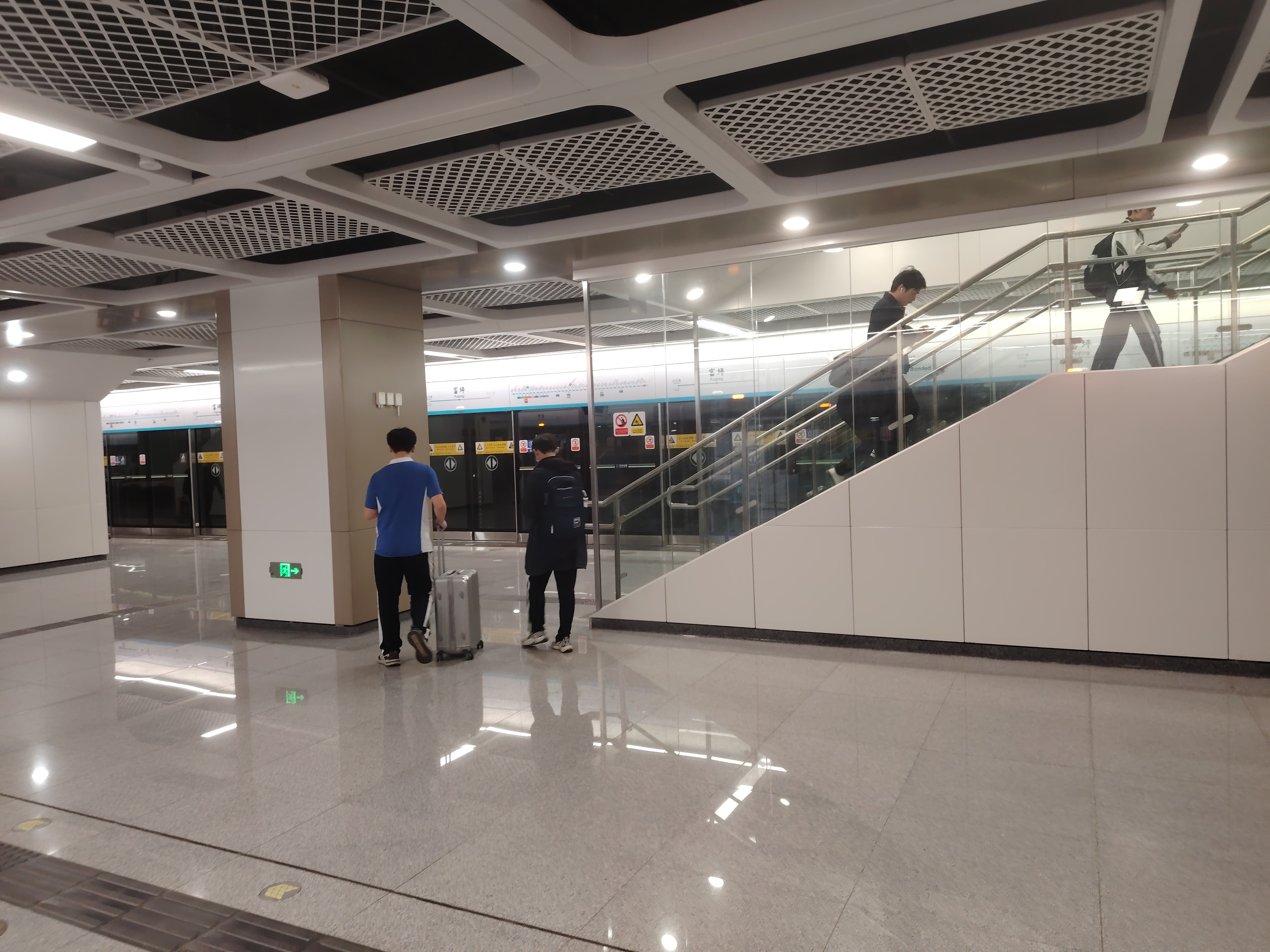
- Platform

Chinese name
- Chinese: 富坪
Transcriptions
Standard Mandarin
- Hanyu Pinyin: Fùpíng
Yue: Cantonese
- Yale Romanization: Fupìng
- Jyutping: Fu3ping4

General information
- Location: Intersection of Fuping North Road (富坪北路) and Zhenxing Road (振兴路); Pingdi Subdistrict, Longgang District, Shenzhen, Guangdong; China
- Coordinates: 22°46′58.357″N 114°18′21.042″E
- Operated by: SZMC (Shenzhen Metro Group)
- Line: Line 3
- Platforms: 2 (1 island platform)
- Tracks: 2

Construction
- Structure type: Underground
- Accessible: Yes

History
- Opened: 28 December 2024 (17 months ago)

Services
| Preceding station | Shenzhen Metro | Following station |
|---|---|---|
| Baishitang towards Futian Bonded Area | Line 3 | Pingdi Liulian Terminus |
Location

Fuping station (Chinese: 富坪站; pinyin: Fùpíng Zhàn; Jyutping: Fu3ping4 Zaam6; Cantonese Yale: Fupìng Jaahm) is a station on Line 3 of Shenzhen Metro. It opened on 28 December 2024, and is located underground in Pingdi Subdistrict in Longgang District.

The station is part of the fourth phase of Line 3 (East Extension).

== Station layout ==
| G | - | Exits |
| B1F; Concourse | Lobby | Ticket Machines, Customer Service, Shops, Vending Machines |
| B2F; Platforms | Platform | 3 towards Futian Bonded Area (Baishitang) |
| B2F; Platforms | Island platform, doors will open on the left |
| B2F; Platforms | Platform | 3 towards Pingdi Liulian (terminus) |

=== Entrances/exits ===
The station has 4 points of entry/exit, with Exits A and C being accessible via elevators. Exit B has a toilet.

- A: Fuping North Road
- B: Fuping North Road
- C: Fuping North Road
- D: Fuping North Road
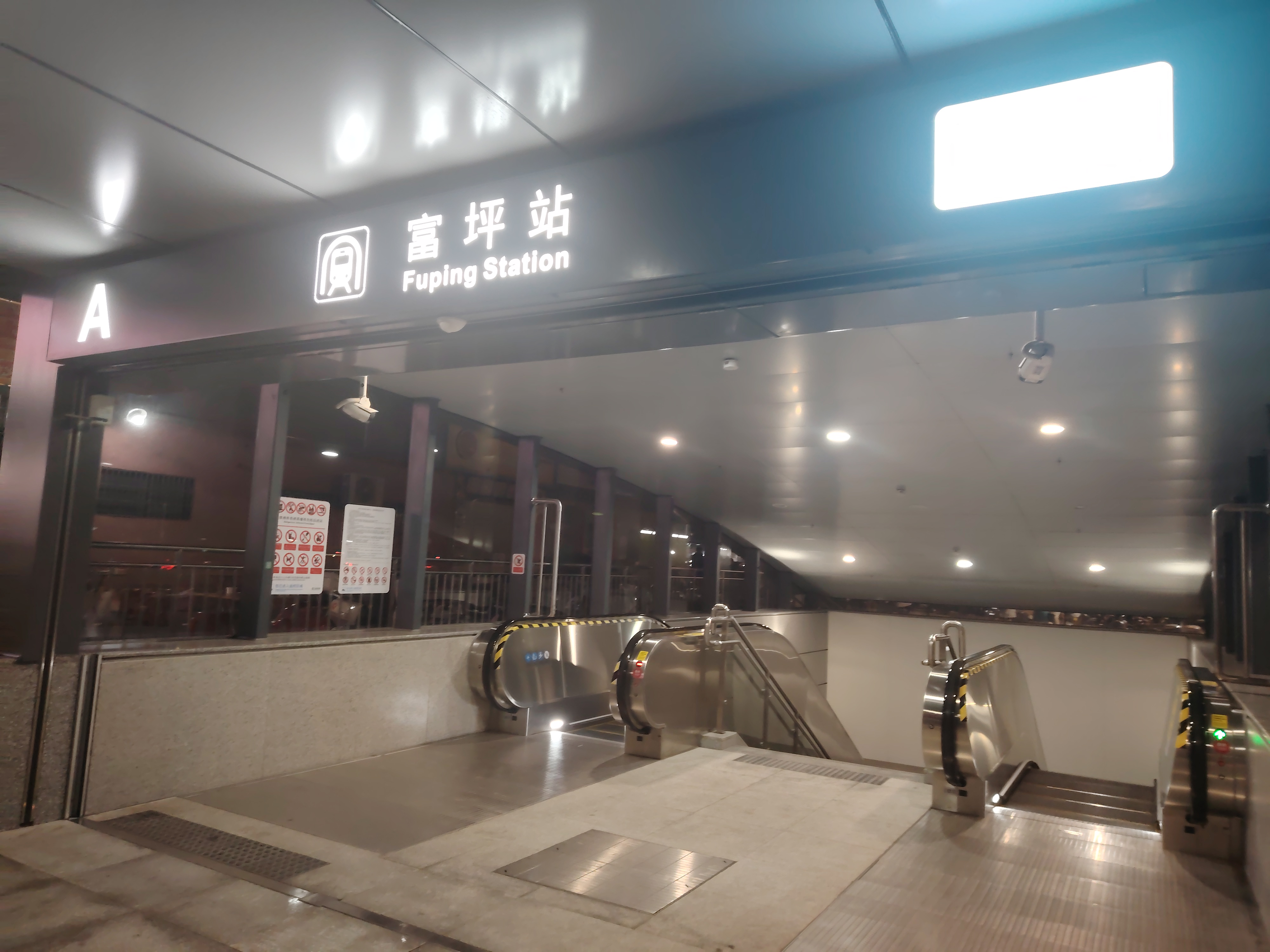
Entrance A

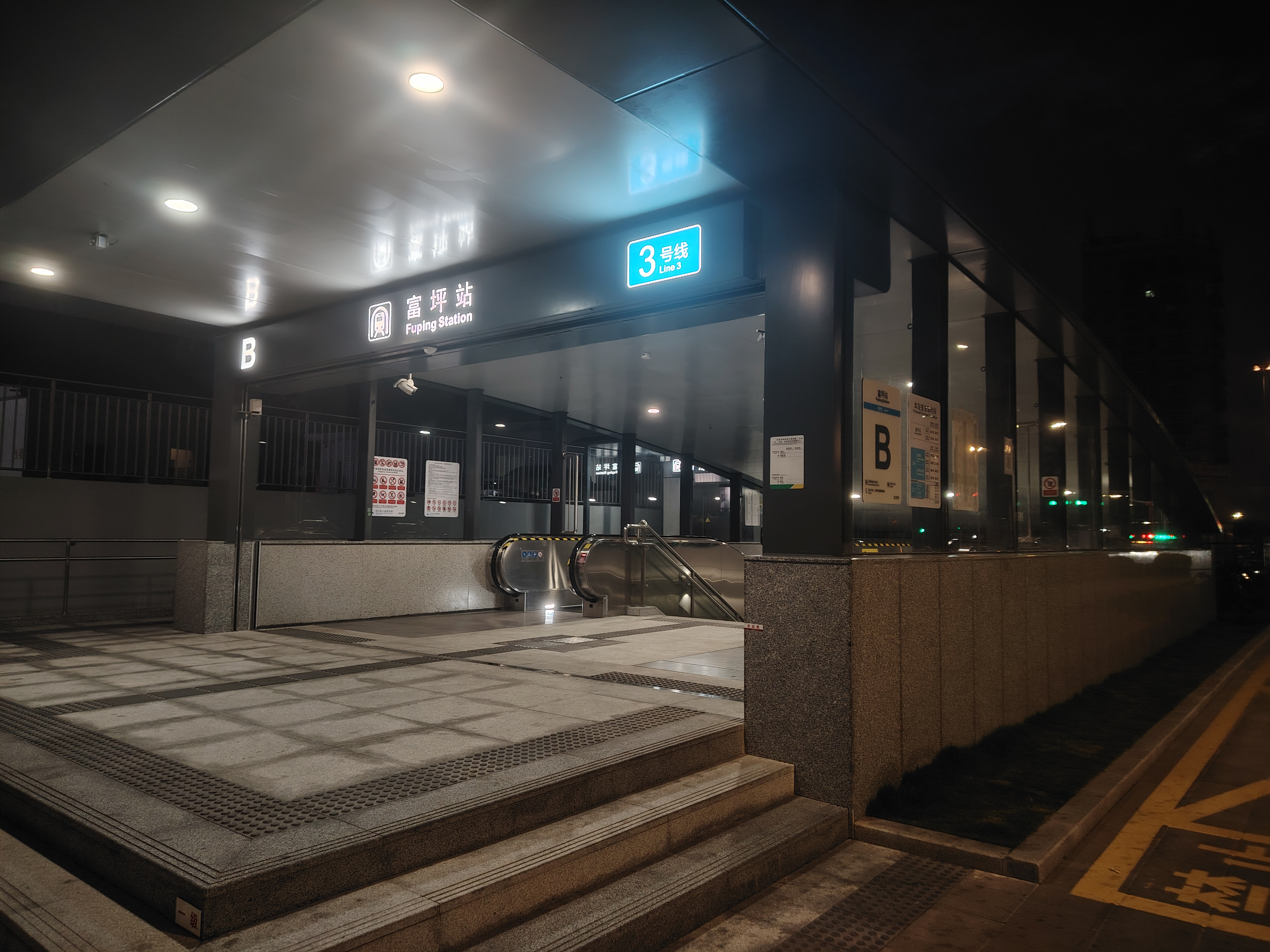
Entrance B

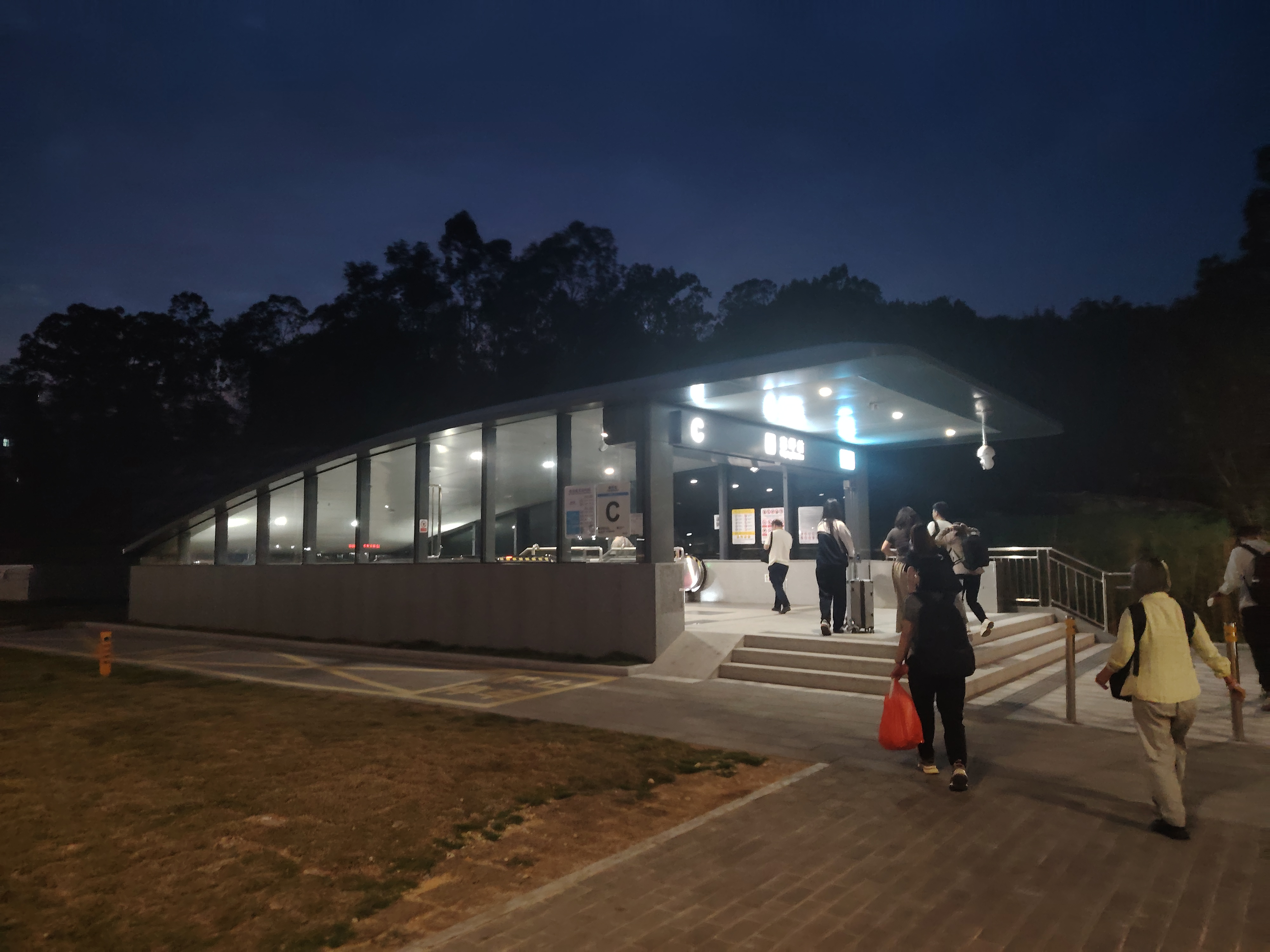
Entrance C
