= Pingdi Liulian station =

Shenzhen Metro Line 3 station

Pingdi Liulian 坪地六联
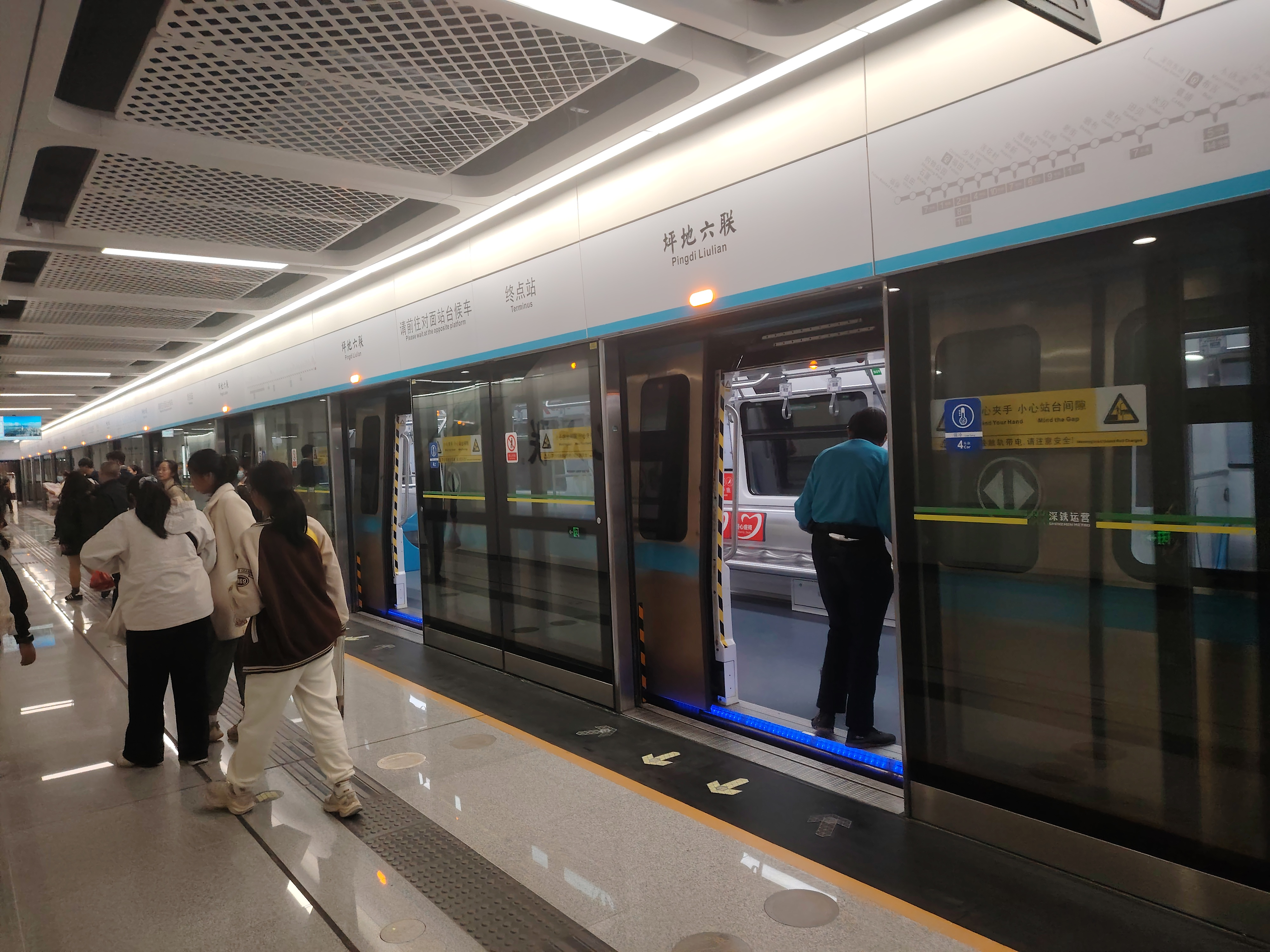
- Alighting platform

Chinese name
- Simplified Chinese: 坪地六联
- Traditional Chinese: 坪地六聯
Transcriptions
Standard Mandarin
- Hanyu Pinyin: Píngdì Liùlián
Yue: Cantonese
- Yale Romanization: Pìngdei Luhklùn
- Jyutping: Ping4dei6 Luk6lyun4

General information
- Location: Liulian Village (六联村); Pingdi Subdistrict, Longgang District, Shenzhen, Guangdong; China
- Coordinates: 22°47′23.003″N 114°19′1.715″E
- Operated by: SZMC (Shenzhen Metro Group)
- Line: Line 3
- Platforms: 2 (2 side platforms)
- Tracks: 2

Construction
- Structure type: Underground
- Accessible: Yes

History
- Opened: 28 December 2024 (17 months ago)

Services
Preceding station	Shenzhen Metro	Following station
Fuping towards Futian Bonded Area	Line 3	Terminus
Location

Pingdi Liulian station (simplified Chinese: 坪地六联站; traditional Chinese: 坪地六聯站; pinyin: Píngdì Liùlián Zhàn; Jyutping: Ping4dei6 Luk6lyun4 Zaam6; Cantonese Yale: Pìngdei Luhklùn Jaahm) is a station on Line 3 of Shenzhen Metro. It opened on 28 December 2024, and is located underground in Pingdi Subdistrict in Longgang District. It is the northern terminus of the line.

The station is part of the fourth phase of Line 3 (East Extension).

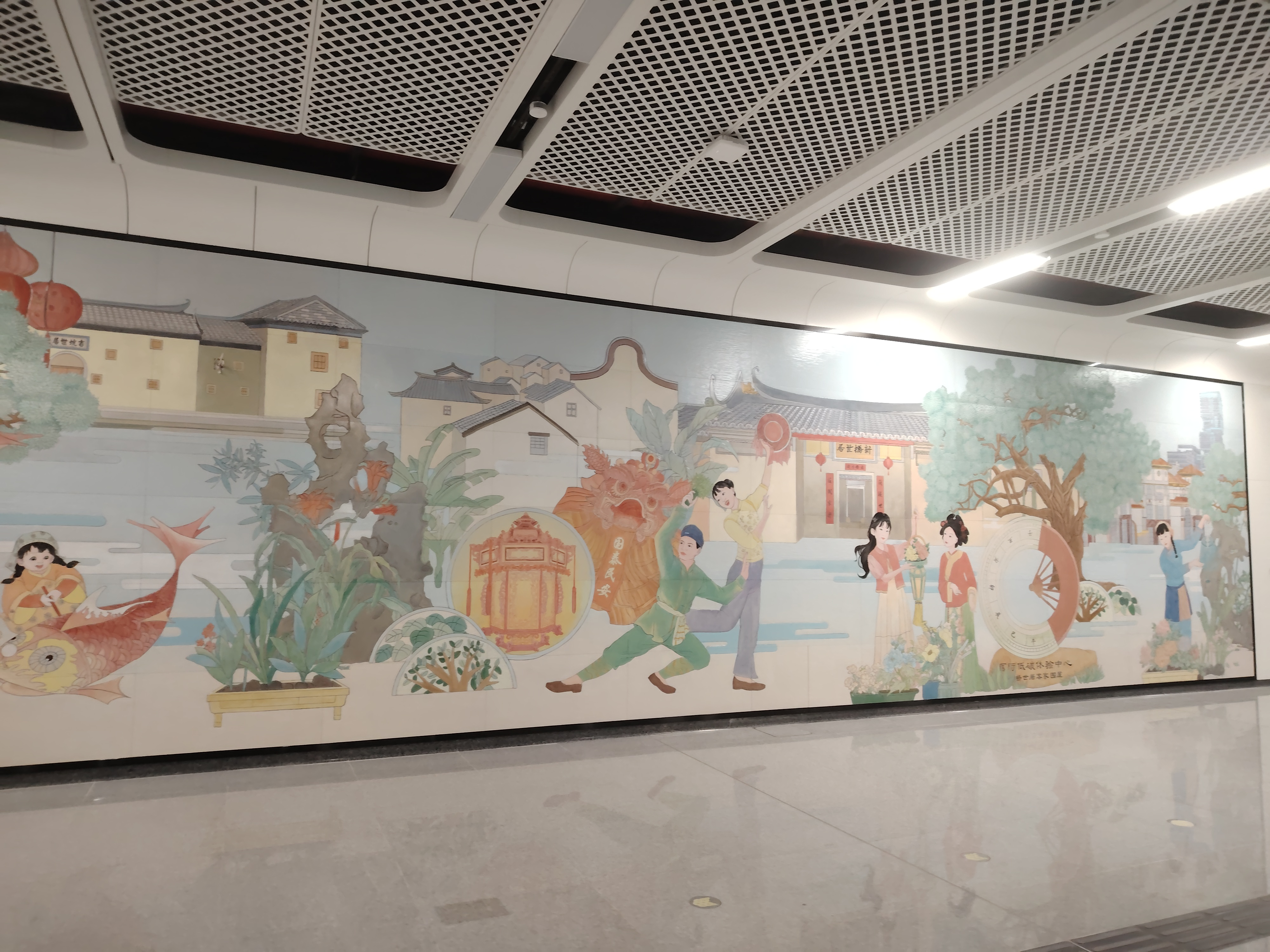
Art wall

== Station layout ==
G	-	Exits
B1F; Concourse	Lobby	Ticket Machines, Customer Service, Shops, Vending Machines
B2F; Platforms	Side platform, doors will open on the right
B2F; Platforms	Platform	3 towards Futian Bonded Area (Fuping)
B2F; Platforms	Platform	3 termination platform
B2F; Platforms	Side platform, doors will open on the right

=== Entrances/exits ===
The station has 4 points of entry/exit, with Exits A and C being accessible via elevators. Exit B has a toilet.

- A: Liulian Village
- B: Liulian Village
- C: Liulian Village
- D: Liulian Village
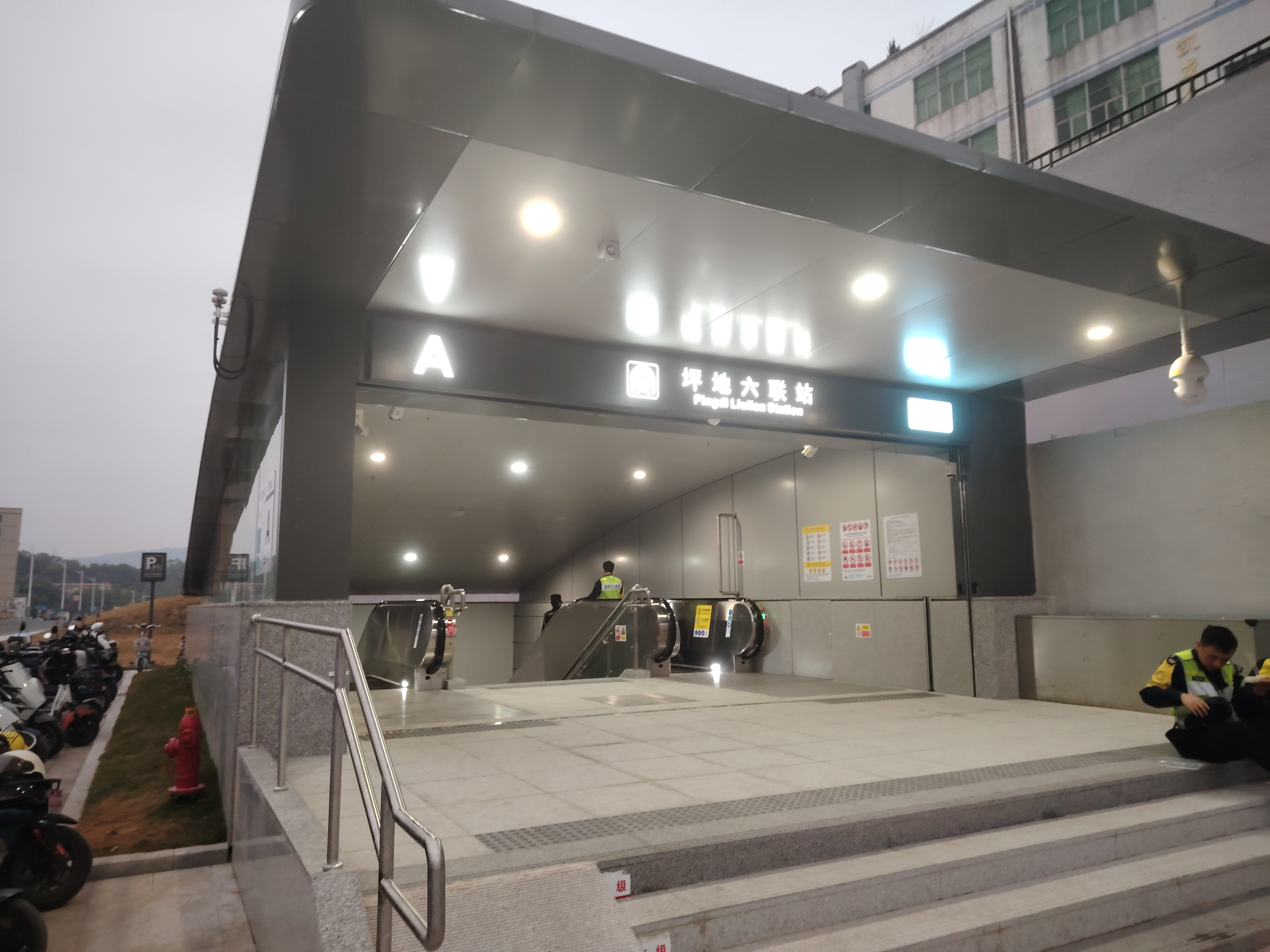
Entrance A

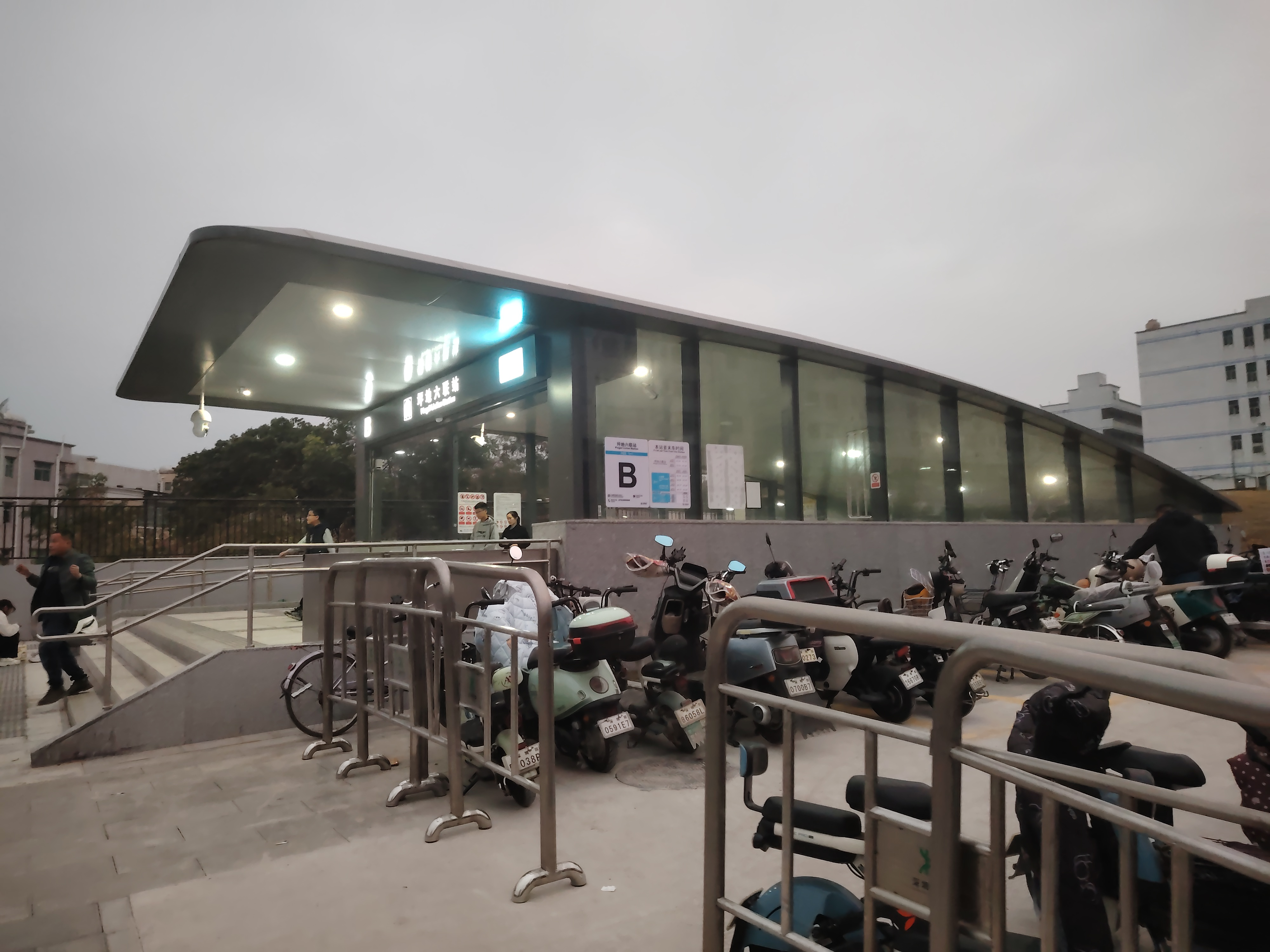
Entrance B

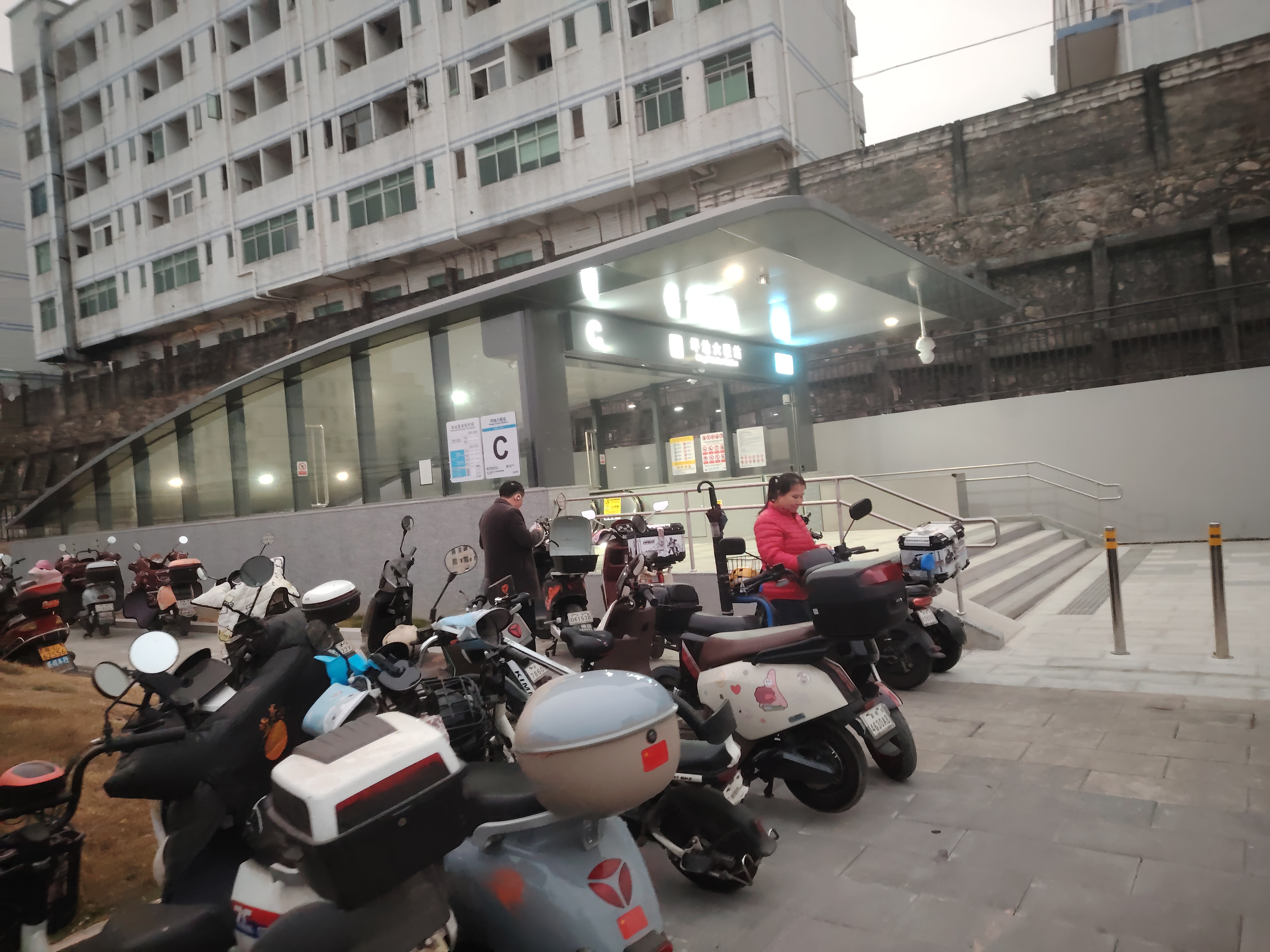
Entrance C

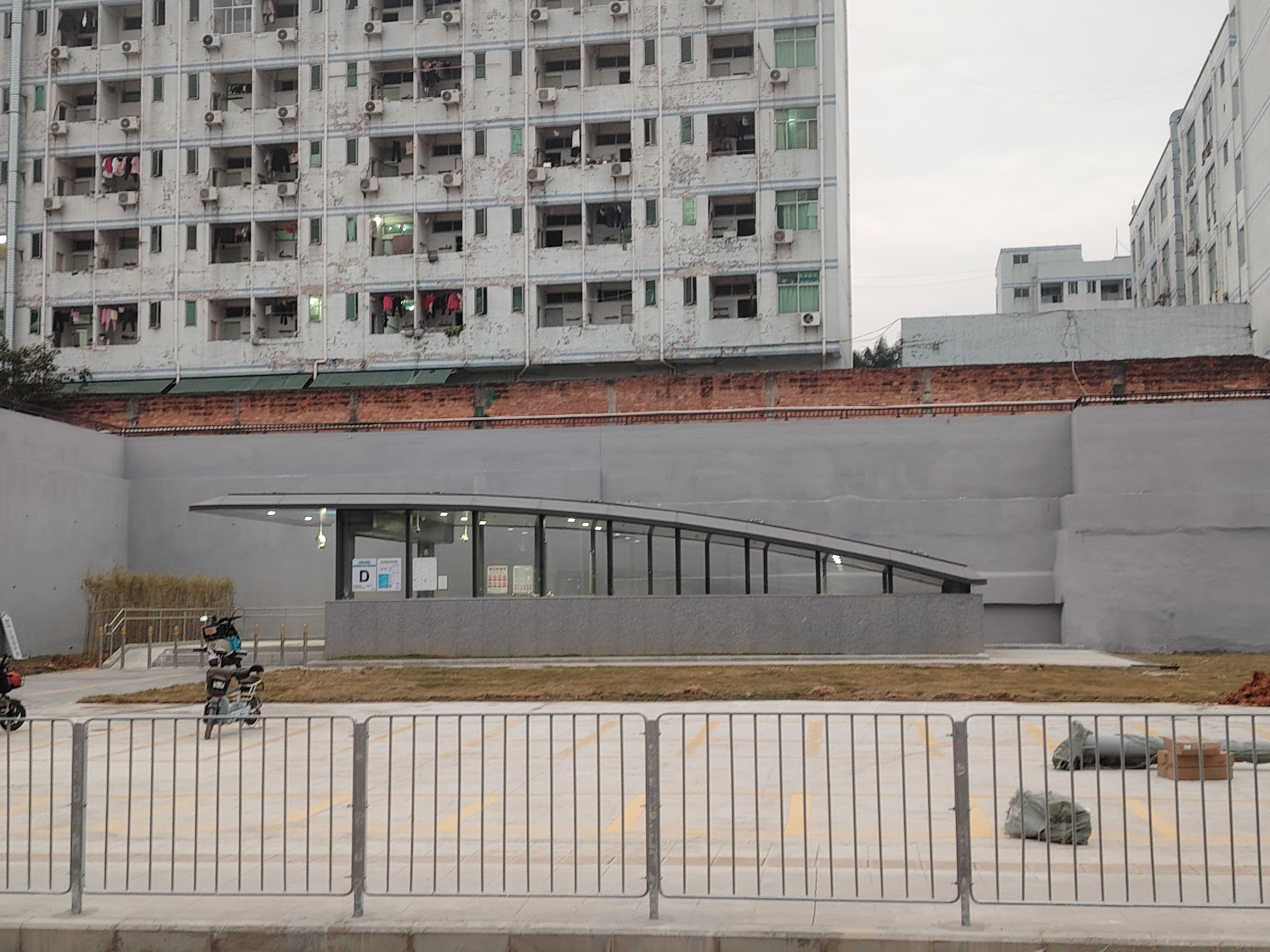
Entrance D
