= Dafen Village =

Suburb of Shenzhen, China

Coordinates: 22°36′45″N 114°07′54″E

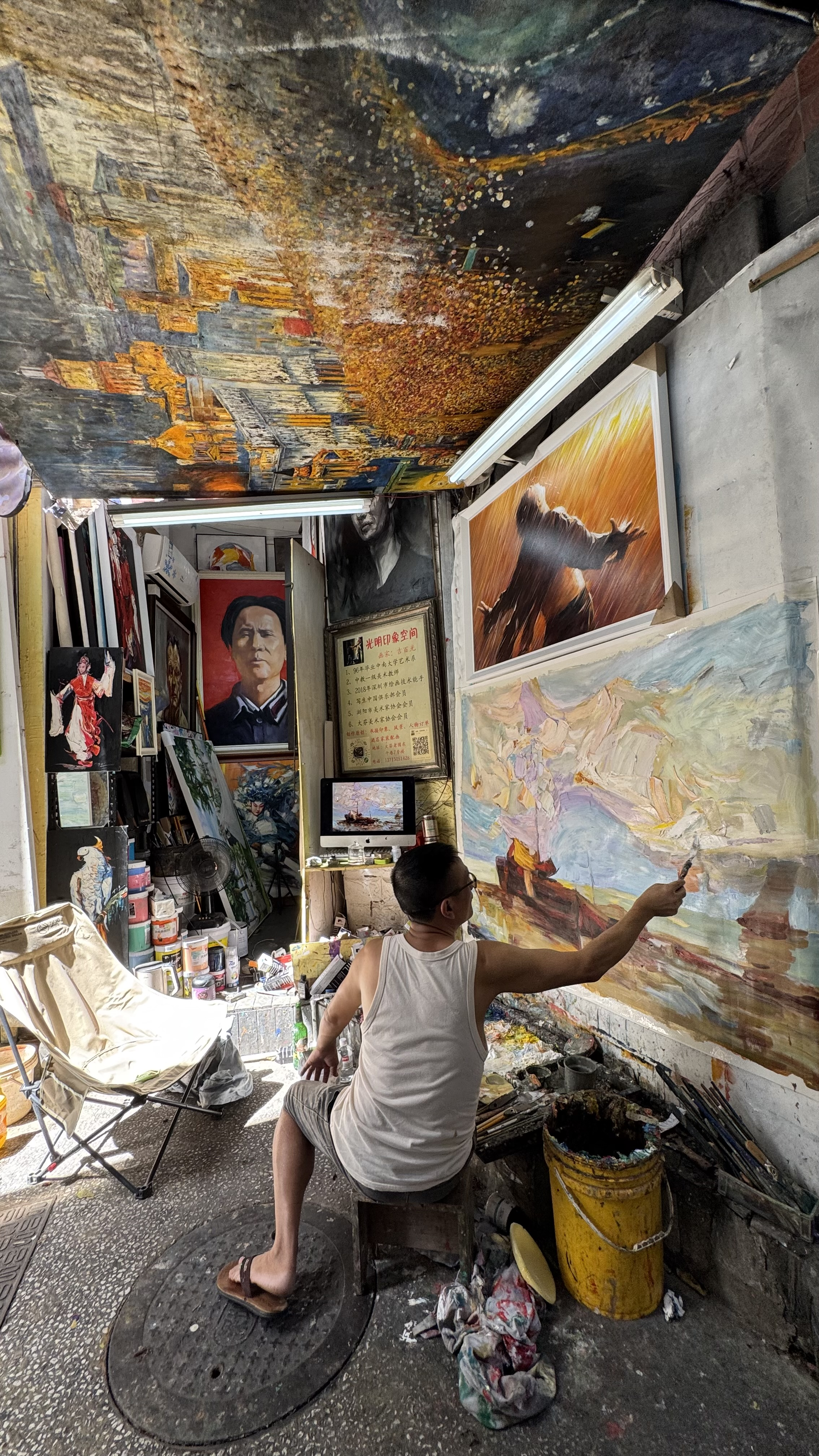
Painter in Dafen

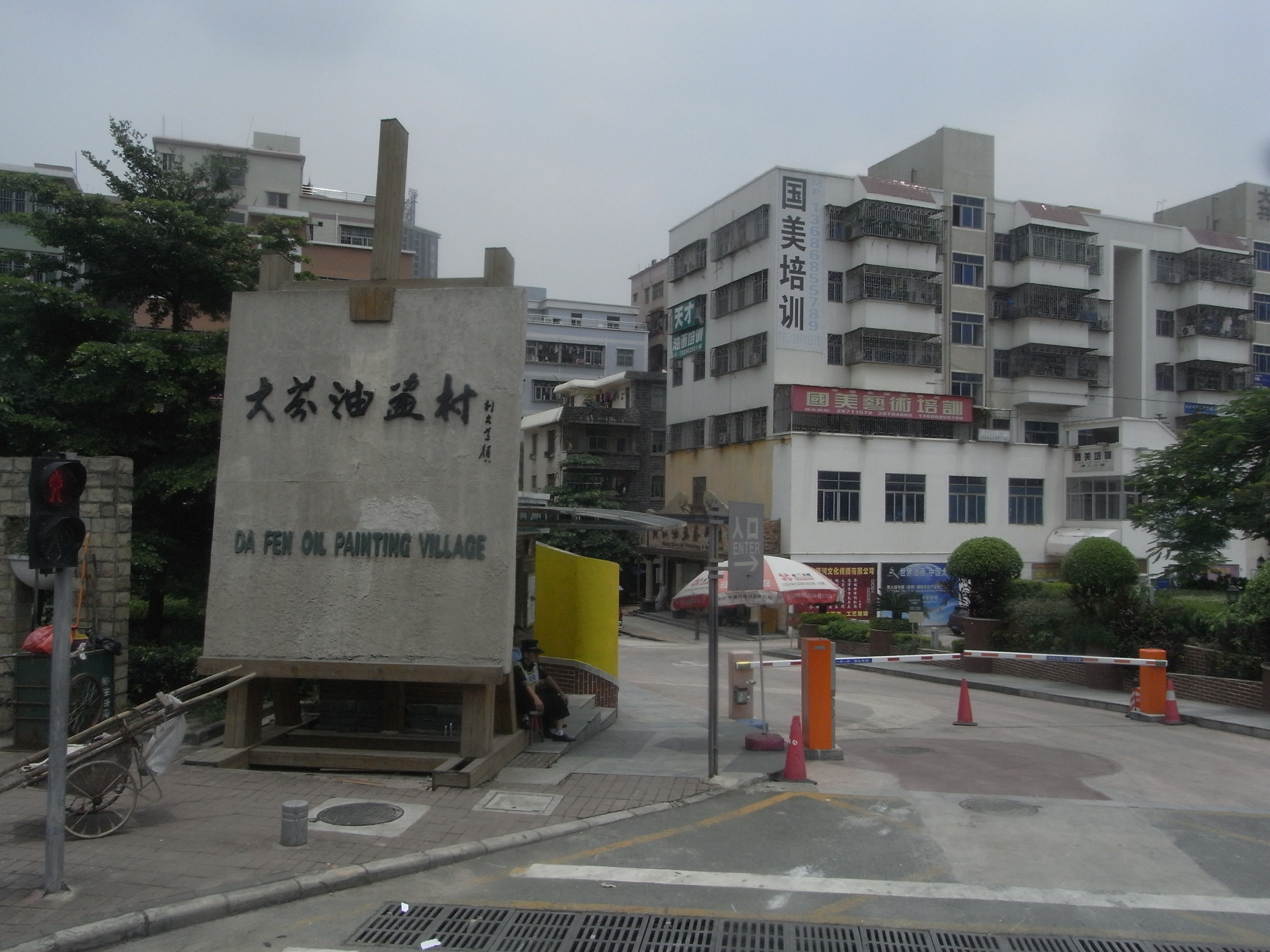
Dafen Oil Painting Village entrance sign

Dafen (Chinese: 大芬; pinyin: Dàfēn; Jyutping: daai6 fan1) is a suburb of Buji, Longgang, Shenzhen, in the province of Guangdong, China. Since 1989, the area has been an artists' village for the production of replicas of masterworks and outsourcing of original art creation as a specialised urban cottage industry.

== History ==
In 1989, the painter Huang Jiang started copying paintings and has since been considered the founder of Dafen's replica industry. In the early 1990s, a group of about twenty artists who trained at art academies took up residence under the leadership of businessman Huang Jiang. They produced dozens of replicas daily of oil paintings by masters such as Vincent van Gogh, Salvador Dalí, Leonardo da Vinci, Rembrandt, and Andy Warhol. In the 1990s, Huang sent a painting to Walmart and received an order of 50,000 paintings, which he had to produce within fourteen days.

After the 2008 financial crisis, Western demand declined and domestic buyers ordered Chinese art copies, forcing a change in style. As of 2014, 7,000 artists were based in Dafen, living and working in the factories, copying paintings, and five million paintings were being exported to the United States and Europe per year. Some artists can finish up to 100 paintings in twelve hours. In 2018, 8,000 people lived in Dafen, and the local government promised to develop it into a tourist destination.

A 2019 publication estimated the Dafen area produced revenues of around US$630 million annually. Previously, talent was needed in the production, but the village has innovated with "large scale printers and clusters of tablets and phones ... use[d] for templating", so that minimal training is required.

== Replicas ==
Official policy states that the replicas produced at Dafen Oil Painting Village are copied from artists who have died more than fifty years ago, and consequently out of copyright. However, the artists copied include Georgia O'Keeffe, who died in 1986. Knockoffs of contemporary artists such as Fernando Botero and Yue Minjun are also sold.
