= List of schools in Longgang District, Shenzhen =

This is a list of schools in Longgang District, Shenzhen.

This list does not include schools that are within the Dapeng New District; they are listed separately in that article.

== Shenzhen municipal schools ==
Schools operated by the Shenzhen municipal government in Longgang District include:

- Shenzhen No. 3 Senior High School (深圳市第三高级中学) Senior High School Division - Central District
- Shenzhen High School of Science (深圳科学高中) - Bantian Subdistrict
- Shenzhen Institute of Technology (深圳技师学院) - Wulian Community, Longcheng Subdistrict
- Shenzhen Sports School (深圳体育运动学校)
- Shenzhen Yuanping Special Education School (深圳元平特殊教育学校) - Buji Subdistrict

== Longgang district schools ==
=== Twelve-year schools ===
- Longgang Pinghu Foreign Languages School (龙岗区平湖外国语学校) - Pinghu Sub-district
- Shenzhen Foreign Languages GBA Academy (深圳外国语湾区学校) - Bantian Subdistrict

=== Secondary schools ===
- Longgang Middle School Affiliated to Central China Normal University (华中师范大学龙岗附属中学) - Longcheng Subdistrict
- Shenzhen Longgang Middle School (深圳市龙岗区龙岗中学)
- Shenzhen Longgang Buji High School (深圳市龙岗区布吉高级中学) - Nanwan Subdistrict
- Shenzhen Longgang Buji Middle School (深圳市龙岗区布吉中学) - Buji Subdistrict
- Shenzhen Longgang Henggang High School (深圳市龙岗区横岗高级中学) - Henggang Subdistrict
- Shenzhen Longgang Henggang Middle School (深圳市龙岗区横岗中学) - Henggang Subdistrict
- Shenzhen Longgang Longcheng High School (深圳市龙岗区龙城高级中学)
- Shenzhen Longgang Longcheng Middle School (深圳市龙岗区龙城初级中学) - Longgang Central City (junior high school)
- Shenzhen Longgang Pingdi Middle School (深圳市龙岗区坪地中学)
- Shenzhen Longgang Pinggang High School (深圳市龙岗区平冈中学)
- Shenzhen Longgang Pinghu Middle School (深圳市龙岗区平湖中学) - Pinghu Subdistrict
- Shenzhen Longgang Shawan Middle School (深圳市龙岗区南湾街道沙湾中学) - Nanwan Subdistrict
- Shenzhen Longgang Yuanshan Experimental School (深圳市龙岗区园山实验学校)
- Shenzhen Middle School Longgang Middle School (深圳市龙岗区深圳中学龙岗初级中学) - Longgang Central City

=== Vocational schools ===
- Shenzhen Longgang Vocational and Technical School (龙岗职业技术学校) - Longgang Central City
- Shenzhen Longgang No. 2 Vocational and Technical School (深圳市龙岗区第二职业技术学校) - Yuanshan Subdistrict

=== Nine-year schools ===
- Longyuan School Affiliated to Central China Normal University (深圳市华中师范大学附属龙园学校) - Longgang Subdistrict
- Pinghu School Affiliated to South China Normal University (华南师范大学附属平湖学校)
- Shenzhen High School of Science Wuhe School (深圳科学高中五和学校) - Bantian Subdistrict
- Shenzhen Longgang School Affiliated to Nanjing Normal University (深圳市龙岗区南京师范大学附属龙岗学校) - Sanlian Community, Jihua Subdistrict
- Shenzhen Longgang School Affiliated to Shanghai International Studies University (深圳市龙岗区上海外国语大学附属龙岗学校) - Longcheng Subdistrict
- Shenzhen Longgang Bantian School Affiliated to Shenzhen University (深圳市龙岗区深圳大学附属坂田学校) - Bantian Subdistrict
- Shenzhen Longgang Bantian Experimental School (深圳市龙岗区坂田实验学校) - Bantian Subdistrict
- Shenzhen Longgang Baolong School (深圳市龙岗区宝龙学校) - Baolong Community, Longgang Subdistrict
- Shenzhen Longgang Buji Keyuan School (深圳市龙岗区布吉街道可园学校) - Buji Subdistrict
- Shenzhen Longgang Buji Mumianwan School (深圳市龙岗区布吉街道木棉湾学校) - Buji Subdistrict
- Shenzhen Longgang Buji Xianyi Foreign Languages School (深圳市龙岗区布吉贤义外国语学校) - Buji Subdistrict
- Shenzhen Longgang Central School (深圳市龙岗区龙岗中心学校) - Sanhe Village, Longgang Subdistrict
- Shenzhen Longgang Dayun School Affiliated to South China Normal University (深圳市龙岗区华南师范大学附属龙岗大运学校) - Longcheng Subdistrict
- Shenzhen Longgang Experimental School (深圳市龙岗区实验学校) - Longcheng Subdistrict
- Shenzhen Longgang Foreign Languages School (深圳市龙岗区外国语学校) - Longcheng Subdistrict
- Shenzhen Longgang Foreign Languages School (Group) New Asia School (深圳市龙岗区外国语学校（集团）新亚洲学校) - Longcheng Subdistrict
- Shenzhen Longgang Fu'an School (深圳市龙岗区福安学校) Longgang Central City
- Shenzhen Longgang Ganli School (深圳市龙岗区甘李学校) - Jihua Subdistrict
- Shenzhen Longgang Henggang Bao'an School (深圳市龙岗区横岗保安学校) - Bao'an Community, Yuanshan Subdistrict
- Shenzhen Longgang Henggang Central School (深圳市龙岗区横岗中心学校) - Henggang Subdistrict
- Shenzhen Longgang Lanzhu School (深圳市龙岗区兰著学校) - Longcheng Subdistrict
- Shenzhen Longgang Lehuai Experimental School (深圳市龙岗区乐淮实验学校) - Pingdi Subdistrict
- Shenzhen Henggang Liuyue School (深圳市龙岗区横岗六约学校) - Henggang Subdistrict
- Shenzhen Longgang Longcheng Senior High School (Education Group) Baolong Foreign Languages School (深圳市龙岗区龙城高级中学（教育集团）宝龙外国语学校) - Baolong Subdistrict
- Shenzhen Longgang Longcheng Senior High School (Education Group) Dongxing Foreign Languages School (深圳市龙岗区龙城高级中学（教育集团）东兴外国语学校) - Longgang District
- Shenzhen Longgang Longcheng Tiancheng School (深圳市龙岗区龙城天成学校) - Longcheng Subdistrict
- Shenzhen Longgang Longwai Group Vanke City School (深圳市龙岗区龙外（集团）万科城学校) - Bantian Subdistrict
- Shenzhen Longgang Nanlian School (深圳市龙岗区龙岗街道南联学校) - Longgang Subdistrict
- Shenzhen Longgang Nanwan School (深圳市龙岗区南湾学校) - Kaisa Science and Technology Plaza, Nanwan Subdistrict
- Shenzhen Longgang Nanwan Shatangbu School (深圳市龙岗区南湾沙塘布学校) - Shatangbu Community, Nanwan Subdistrict
- Shenzhen Longgang Ping'anli School (深圳市龙岗区平安里学校) - Longgang Central City
- Shenzhen Longgang Pingdi Lanling School (深圳市龙岗区坪地兰陵学校) - Pingdi Subdistrict
- Shenzhen Longgang Pinghu Central School (深圳市龙岗区平湖中心学校) - Pinghu Subdistrict
- Shenzhen Longgang Pinghu Experimental School (深圳市龙岗区平湖实验学校) - E'gongling Community, Pinghu Subdistrict
- Shenzhen Longgang Pinghu Second Experimental School (深圳市龙岗区平湖第二实验学校) - Shansha Community, Pinghu Subdistrict
- Shenzhen Longgang Pinghu Xinde School (深圳市龙岗区平湖信德学校) - Fucheng'ao Community, Pinghu Subdistrict
- Shenzhen Longgang Science and Technology City Foreign Languages School (深圳市龙岗区科技城外国语学校) - Bantian Subdistrict
- Shenzhen Longgang Shiyaling School (深圳市龙岗区石芽岭学校) - Nanwan Subdistrict
- Shenzhen Longgang Special Education School (深圳市龙岗区特殊教育学校) - Huanggekeng Community, Longcheng Subdistrict
- Shenzhen Longgang Tongxin Experimental School (深圳市龙岗区同心实验学校) - Baolong Subdistrict
- Shenzhen Longgang Tongle Zhuli School (深圳市龙岗区龙岗街道同乐主力学校) - Tongxin Community, Baolong Subdistrict
- Shenzhen Longgang Wutong School (深圳市龙岗区横岗街道梧桐学校) - Henggang Subdistrict
- Shenzhen Longgang Xiantian Foreign Languages School (深圳市龙岗区仙田外国语学校) - Longgang Subdistrict
- Shenzhen Longgang Xinghe School of Longgang Foreign Languages School Group (深圳市龙岗区外国语学校（集团）星河学校) - Longcheng Subdistrict
- Shenzhen Longgang Xinzi School (深圳市龙岗区龙岗街道新梓学校) - Xinsheng Community
- Shenzhen Longgang Yangmei Experimental School (深圳市龙岗区扬美实验学校) - Bantian Subdistrict
- Shenzhen Longgang Yicui Experimental School (深圳市龙岗区吉华街道怡翠实验学校) - Zhonghai Yicui Villa, Jihua Subdistrict
- Tianyu Experimental School (天誉实验学校) - Longcheng Subdistrict
- Zhixin Primary School Affiliated to The Chinese University of Hong Kong, Shenzhen (香港中文大学（深圳）附属知新学校) - Central City

=== Primary schools ===
- Pingdi Central Primary School (坪地中心小学) - Pingdi Subdistrict
- Pingdi Liulian Primary School (坪地六联小学)
- Shenzhen Longgang Primary School Affiliated to Shenzhen Middle School (深圳市龙岗区深圳中学龙岗小学)
- Shenzhen Longgang An'liang Primary School (深圳市龙岗区横岗街道安良小学) - An'liang Community, Henggang Subdistrict
- Shenzhen Longgang Bainikeng Primary School (深圳市龙岗区平湖街道白坭坑小学) - Bainikeng Community, Pinghu Subdistrict
- Shenzhen Longgang Bantian Primary School (深圳市龙岗区坂田街道坂田小学) - Bantian Subdistrict
- Shenzhen Longgang Baogang Primary School (深圳市龙岗区坂田街道宝岗小学) - Bantian Subdistrict
- Shenzhen Longgang Buji Central Primary School (深圳市龙岗区布吉街道中心小学) - Buji Subdistrict
- Shenzhen Longgang Dakang Primary School (深圳市龙岗区横岗街道大康小学) - Yuanshan Subdistrict
- Shenzhen Longgang Danzhutou Primary School (深圳市龙岗区南湾丹竹头小学) - Nanwan Subdistrict
- Shenzhen Longgang Dexing Primary School (深圳市龙岗区布吉街道德兴小学) - Dexing Garden Real Estate
- Shenzhen Longgang E'xi Primary School (深圳市龙岗区平湖街道鹅溪小学) - E'gongling Community, Pinghu Subdistrict
- Shenzhen Longgang Fenghuangshan Primary School (深圳市龙岗区平湖街道凤凰山小学) - Pinghu Subdistrict
- Shenzhen Longgang Foreign Languages School Group Ailian Primary School (深圳市龙岗区外国语学校（集团）爱联小学) - Longcheng Subdistrict
- Shenzhen Longgang Foreign Languages School (Group) Hemei Primary School (深圳市龙岗区外国语学校（集团）和美小学) - Bantian Subdistrict
- Shenzhen Longgang Foreign Languages School (Group) Ruyi Primary School (深圳市龙岗区外国语学校（集团）如意小学)
- Shenzhen Longgang Fucheng'ao Primary School (深圳市龙岗区平湖街道辅城坳小学) - Pinghu Subdistrict
- Shenzhen Longgang Huacheng Primary School (深圳市龙岗区坂田街道花城小学) - Siji Huacheng Community, Bantian Subdistrict
- Shenzhen Longgang Houde Primary School (深圳市龙岗区园山街道厚德小学) - He'ao Community, Yuanshan Subdistrict
- Shenzhen Longgang Jixiang Primary School (深圳市龙岗区吉祥小学) - Buji Subdistrict
- Shenzhen Longgang Juying Primary School (深圳市龙岗区横岗聚英小学) - Henggang Subdistrict
- Shenzhen Longgang Lecheng Primary School Affiliated to South China Normal University (深圳市龙岗区华南师范大学附属龙岗乐城小学) - Yuanshan Subdistrict
- Shenzhen Longgang Lianhua Primary School (深圳市龙岗区布吉街道莲花小学) - Buji Subdistrict
- Shenzhen Longgang Longcheng Primary School (深圳市龙岗区龙城小学) - Longgang Central City
- Shenzhen Longgang Longxi Primary School (深圳市龙岗区龙岗街道龙西小学) - Longxi Community, Longgang Subdistrict
- Shenzhen Longgang Longyuan Yijing Primary School (深圳市龙岗区龙园意境小学) - Longyuan Yijing Huayuan, Buji Subdistrict
- Shenzhen Longgang Lucheng Foreign Languages Primary School (深圳市龙岗区麓城外国语小学) - Shuijing Community, Jihua Subdistrict
- Shenzhen Longgang Nanling Primary School (深圳市龙岗区南湾街道南岭小学) - Nanling Village, Nanwan Subdistrict
- Shenzhen Longgang Nanyue Primary School (深圳市龙岗区龙岗街道南约小学) - Baolong Subdistrict
- Shenzhen Longgang Nanwan Experimental Primary School (深圳市龙岗区南湾实验小学) - Nanwan Subdistrict
- Shenzhen Longgang Qianlinshan Primary School (深圳市龙岗区龙城街道千林山小学) - Wulian Community, Longgang Subdistrict
- Shenzhen Longgang Qinglin Primary School (深圳市龙岗区清林小学) - Longgang Central City
- Shenzhen Longgang Qinglinjing Experimental Primary School (深圳市龙岗区清林径实验小学) - Wulian Community
- Shenzhen Longgang Shawan Primary School (深圳市龙岗区南湾街道沙湾小学) - Nanwan Subdistrictn Subdistrict
- Shenzhen Longgang Shaxi Primary School (深圳市龙岗区南湾街道沙西小学) - Nanling Village, Nanwan Subdistrict
- Shenzhen Longgang Shengping Primary School (深圳市龙岗区龙城街道盛平小学) - Shengping Community
- Shenzhen Longgang Shouzhen Primary School (深圳市龙岗区守真小学) - Pinghu Subdistrict
- Shenzhen Longgang Shuijing Primary School (深圳市龙岗区布吉街道水径小学) - Shangshuijing Community, Jihua Subdistrict
- Shenzhen Longgang Shuijingcheng Primary School (深圳市龙岗区横岗水晶城小学) - Yinhe Community, Yuansha
- Shenzhen Longgang Silian Primary School (深圳市龙岗区横岗街道四联小学) - Henggang Subdistrict
- Shenzhen Longgang Wenjing Primary School (深圳市龙岗区布吉街道文景小学) - Buji Subdistrict
- Shenzhen Longgang Wuhe Primary School (深圳市龙岗区五和小学) - Bantian Subdistrict
- Shenzhen Longgang Wuyuan Primary School (深圳市龙岗区五园小学) - Bantian Subdistrict
- Shenzhen Longgang Xialilang Primary School (深圳市龙岗区南湾街道下李朗小学) - Xialilang Community, Nanwan Subdistrict
- Shenzhen Longgang Xikeng Primary School (深圳市龙岗区横岗街道西坑小学) - Xikeng Community, Yuanshan Subdistrict
- Shenzhen Longgang Xinsheng Primary School (深圳市龙岗区龙岗街道新生小学) - Xinsheng Community, Longgang Subdistrict
- Shenzhen Longgang Xinyi Primary School (深圳市龙岗区布吉街道信义实验小学) - Luogang Community, Buji Subdistrict
- Shenzhen Longgang Xuexiang Primary School (深圳市龙岗区坂田街道雪象小学) - Bantian Subdistrict
- Shenzhen Longgang Yabao Primary School Affiliated to South China Normal University (深圳市龙岗区华南师范大学附属龙岗雅宝小学) - Bantian Subdistrict
- Shenzhen Longgang Yangguang Primary School (深圳市龙岗区布吉街道阳光小学) - Yangguang Huayuan, Jihua Subdistrict
- Shenzhen Longgang Yishanjun Primary School (深圳市龙岗区依山郡小学)
- Shenzhen Longgang Yuelanshan Primary School (深圳市龙岗区悦澜山实验小学) - Longcheng Subdistrict, Longgang District
- Shenzhen Longgang Yuxian Primary School (深圳市龙岗区龙岗街道育贤小学) - Longdong Community, Baolong Subdistrict
- Shenzhen Longgang Zhenxin Primary School (深圳市龙岗区龙岗街道振新小学)
