= Maluan Mountain =

Mountain in Shenzhen, China

Maluan Mountain (Traditional Chinese: 馬巒山, Simplified Chinese: 马峦山) is a mountainous area and country park in the eastern part of Shenzhen in China, located between Yantian District and Pingshan District. It borders the Sanzhoutian Reservoir in Yantian District to the west, extends to Kuichong Subdistrict in the east, and adjoins Xiaomeisha to the south. Its highest peak is 525 metres. The mountain contains Longtan Waterfall, the highest waterfall in Shenzhen, as well as six Hakka villages from the Ming and Qing dynasties with a history of 300 years.。

== Transport ==
- Shenzhen Metro Line 3 Yonghu station, Line 14 Jinlong station
