= List of administrative divisions of Shenzhen =

List of districts in Shenzhen

The sub-provincial municipality of Shenzhen in Guangdong, China is divided into nine districts and one management new area. Shenzhen is further divided into 74 subdistricts since the latest plan in October 2016.

== County-level divisions ==
Map	Name	Chinese (S)	Hanyu Pinyin	Population (2010 census)	Area (km²)	Density (/km²)
	Futian District	福田区	Fútián Qū	1,318,055	79	16,756
	Luohu District	罗湖区	Luóhú Qū	923,423	79	11,726
	Nanshan District	南山区	Nánshān Qū	1,087,936	182	5,877
	Yantian District	盐田区	Yántián Qū	208,861	72	2,798
	Bao'an District	宝安区	Bǎo'ān Qū	2,638,807	402	6,564
	Longgang District	龙岗区	Lónggǎng Qū	1,831,225	382	2,794
	Pingshan District	坪山区	Píngshān Qū	309,211	168	1,852
	Longhua District	龙华区	Lónghuá Qū	1,379,000	175	7,880
	Guangming District	光明区	Guāngmíng Qū	481,420	156	3,097
	Dapeng New District	大鹏新区	Dàpéng Xīn Qū	180,000	294	612
	Total			10,357,938	1,989	5,201

== Subdistricts ==
District		Subdistrict		
District		Name	Chinese (S)	Hanyu Pinyin
Futian District 福田区; Fútián Qū		Shatou Subdistrict	沙头街道	Shātóu Jiēdào
Futian District 福田区; Fútián Qū		Nanyuan Subdistrict	南园街道	Nányuán Jiēdào
Futian District 福田区; Fútián Qū		Yuanling Subdistrict	园岭街道	Yuánlǐng Jiēdào
Futian District 福田区; Fútián Qū		Huafu Subdistrict	华富街道	Huáfù Jiēdào
Futian District 福田区; Fútián Qū		Futian Subdistrict	福田街道	Fútián Jiēdào
Futian District 福田区; Fútián Qū		Xiangmihu Subdistrict	香蜜湖街道	Xiāngmìhú Jiēdào
Futian District 福田区; Fútián Qū		Lianhua Subdistrict	莲花街道	Liánhuā Jiēdào
Futian District 福田区; Fútián Qū		Meilin Subdistrict	梅林街道	Méilín Jiēdào
Futian District 福田区; Fútián Qū		Huaqiangbei Subdistrict	华强北街道	Huáqiángběi Jiēdào
Futian District 福田区; Fútián Qū		Fubao Subdistrict	福保街道	Fúbǎo jiēdào
Luohu District 罗湖区; Luóhú Qū		Huangbei Subdistrict	黄贝街道	Huángbèi Jiēdào
Luohu District 罗湖区; Luóhú Qū		Guiyuan Subdistrict	桂园街道	Guìyuán Jiēdào
Luohu District 罗湖区; Luóhú Qū		Dongmen Subdistrict	东门街道	Dōngmén Jiēdào
Luohu District 罗湖区; Luóhú Qū		Cuizhu Subdistrict	翠竹街道	Cuìzhú Jiēdào
Luohu District 罗湖区; Luóhú Qū		Dongxiao Subdistrict	东晓街道	Dōngxiǎo Jiēdào
Luohu District 罗湖区; Luóhú Qū		Nanhu Subdistrict	南湖街道	Nánhú Jiēdào
Luohu District 罗湖区; Luóhú Qū		Sungang Subdistrict	笋岗街道	Sǔngǎng Jiēdào
Luohu District 罗湖区; Luóhú Qū		Donghu Subdistrict	东湖街道	Dōnghú Jiēdào
Luohu District 罗湖区; Luóhú Qū		Liantang Subdistrict	莲塘街道	Liántáng Jiēdào
Luohu District 罗湖区; Luóhú Qū		Qingshuihe Subdistrict	清水河街道	Qīngshuǐhé Jiēdào
Nanshan District 南山区; Nánshān Qū		Nantou Subdistrict	南头街道	Nántóu Jiēdào
Nanshan District 南山区; Nánshān Qū		Nanshan Subdistrict	南山街道	Nánshān Jiēdào
Nanshan District 南山区; Nánshān Qū		Shahe Subdistrict	沙河街道	Shāhé Jiēdào
Nanshan District 南山区; Nánshān Qū		Xili Subdistrict	西丽街道	Xīlì Jiēdào
Nanshan District 南山区; Nánshān Qū		Shekou Subdistrict	蛇口街道	Shékǒu Jiēdào
Nanshan District 南山区; Nánshān Qū		Zhaoshang Subdistrict	招商街道	Zhāoshāng Jiēdào
Nanshan District 南山区; Nánshān Qū		Yuehai Subdistrict	粤海街道	Yuèhǎi Jiēdào
Nanshan District 南山区; Nánshān Qū		Taoyuan Subdistrict	桃园街道	Táoyuán Jiēdào
Yantian District 盐田区; Yántián Qū		Haishan Subdistrict	海山街道	Hǎishān Jiēdào
Yantian District 盐田区; Yántián Qū		Yantian Subdistrict	盐田街道	Yántián Jiēdào
Yantian District 盐田区; Yántián Qū		Meisha Subdistrict	梅沙街道	Méishā Jiēdào
Yantian District 盐田区; Yántián Qū		Shatoujiao Subdistrict	沙头角街道	Shātóujiǎo Jiēdào
Pingshan District 坪山区; Píngshān Qū		Pingshan Subdistrict	坪山街道	Píngshān Jiēdào
Pingshan District 坪山区; Píngshān Qū		Biling Subdistrict	碧岭街道	Bìlǐng Jiēdào
Pingshan District 坪山区; Píngshān Qū		Shijing Subdistrict	石井街道	Shíjǐng Jiēdào
Pingshan District 坪山区; Píngshān Qū		Kengzi Subdistrict	坑梓街道	Kēngzǐ jiēdào
Pingshan District 坪山区; Píngshān Qū		Longtian Subdistrict	龙田街道	Lóngtián Jiēdào
Pingshan District 坪山区; Píngshān Qū		Maluan Subdistrict	马峦街道	Mǎluán Jiēdào
Longhua District 龙华区; Lónghuá Qū		Longhua Subdistrict	龙华街道	Lónghuá Jiēdào
Longhua District 龙华区; Lónghuá Qū		Minzhi Subdistrict	民治街道	Mínzhì Jiēdào
Longhua District 龙华区; Lónghuá Qū		Dalang Subdistrict	大浪街道	Dàlàng Jiēdào
Longhua District 龙华区; Lónghuá Qū		Guanlan Subdistrict	观澜街道	Guānlán Jiēdào
Longhua District 龙华区; Lónghuá Qū		Fucheng Subdistrict	福城街道	Fúchéng Jiēdào
Longhua District 龙华区; Lónghuá Qū		Guanhu Subdistrict	观湖街道	Guānhú Jiēdào
Bao'an District 宝安区; Bǎo'ān Qū		Xin'an Subdistrict	新安街道	Xīn'ān Jiēdào
Bao'an District 宝安区; Bǎo'ān Qū		Shiyan Subdistrict	石岩街道	Shíyán Jiēdào
Bao'an District 宝安区; Bǎo'ān Qū		Xixiang Subdistrict	西乡街道	Xīxiāng Jiēdào
Bao'an District 宝安区; Bǎo'ān Qū		Fuyong Subdistrict	福永街道	Fúyǒng Jiēdào
Bao'an District 宝安区; Bǎo'ān Qū		Shajing Subdistrict	沙井街道	Shājǐng Jiēdào
Bao'an District 宝安区; Bǎo'ān Qū		Songgang Subdistrict	松岗街道	Sōnggǎng Jiēdào
Bao'an District 宝安区; Bǎo'ān Qū		Hangcheng Subdistrict	航城街道	Hángchéng Jiēdào
Bao'an District 宝安区; Bǎo'ān Qū		Fuhai Subdistrict	福海街道	Fúhǎi Jiēdào
Bao'an District 宝安区; Bǎo'ān Qū		Xinqiao Subdistrict	新桥街道	Xīnqiáo Jiēdào
Bao'an District 宝安区; Bǎo'ān Qū		Yanluo Subdistrict	燕罗街道	Yànluó Jiēdào
Guangming District 光明区; Guāngmíng Qū		Guangming Subdistrict	光明街道	Guāngmíng Jiēdào
Guangming District 光明区; Guāngmíng Qū		Gongming Subdistrict	公明街道	Gōngmíng Jiēdào
Guangming District 光明区; Guāngmíng Qū		Xinhu Subdistrict	新湖街道	Xīnhú Jiēdào
Guangming District 光明区; Guāngmíng Qū		Fenghuang Subdistrict	凤凰街道	Fènghuáng Jiēdào
Guangming District 光明区; Guāngmíng Qū		Yutang Subdistrict	玉塘街道	Yùtáng Jiēdào
Guangming District 光明区; Guāngmíng Qū		Matian Subdistrict	马田街道	Mǎtián Jiēdào
Longgang District 龙岗区; Lónggǎng Qū	Direct administration	Longcheng Subdistrict	龙城街道	Lóngchéng Jiēdào
Longgang District 龙岗区; Lónggǎng Qū	Direct administration	Longgang Subdistrict	龙岗街道	Lónggǎng Jiēdào
Longgang District 龙岗区; Lónggǎng Qū	Direct administration	Henggang Subdistrict	横岗街道	Hénggǎng Jiēdào
Longgang District 龙岗区; Lónggǎng Qū	Direct administration	Buji Subdistrict	布吉街道	Bùjí Jiēdào
Longgang District 龙岗区; Lónggǎng Qū	Direct administration	Bantian Subdistrict	坂田街道	Bǎntián Jiēdào
Longgang District 龙岗区; Lónggǎng Qū	Direct administration	Nanwan Subdistrict	南湾街道	Nánwān Jiēdào
Longgang District 龙岗区; Lónggǎng Qū	Direct administration	Pinghu Subdistrict	平湖街道	Pínghú Jiēdào
Longgang District 龙岗区; Lónggǎng Qū	Direct administration	Pingdi Subdistrict	坪地街道	Píngdì Jiēdào
Longgang District 龙岗区; Lónggǎng Qū	Direct administration	Baolong Subdistrict	宝龙街道	Bǎolóng Jiēdào
Longgang District 龙岗区; Lónggǎng Qū	Direct administration	Jihua Subdistrict	吉华街道	Jíhuá Jiēdào
Longgang District 龙岗区; Lónggǎng Qū	Direct administration	Yuanshan Subdistrict	园山街道	Yuánshān Jiēdào
Longgang District 龙岗区; Lónggǎng Qū	Dapeng New District 大鹏新区; Dàpéng Xīn Qū	Dapeng Subdistrict	大鹏街道	Dàpéng Jiēdào
Longgang District 龙岗区; Lónggǎng Qū	Dapeng New District 大鹏新区; Dàpéng Xīn Qū	Kuichong Subdistrict	葵涌街道	Kuíchōng Jiēdào
Longgang District 龙岗区; Lónggǎng Qū	Dapeng New District 大鹏新区; Dàpéng Xīn Qū	Nan'ao Subdistrict	南澳街道	Nán'ào Jiēdào

(Source unless otherwise stated:)

== Historical divisions ==
=== ROC (1911-1949) ===
County / City	Present division
Bao'an County, Guangdong 寶安縣	Futian, Luohu, Nanshan, Yantian, Bao'an, Longgang, Guangming, Pingshan, Longhua, Dapeng

== See also ==
- Shenzhen
- Geography of Shenzhen
- Geography of Guangdong
- List of administrative divisions of Guangdong
- List of township-level divisions of Guangdong
