= 葵涌 =

葵涌 may refer to:

- Kwai Chung, an area in the New Territories, Hong Kong
- Kuichong Subdistrict, a subdistrict of Shenzhen, China
