= Shenzhen Universiade Sports Centre =

Sports venue in Shenzhen, China

Coordinates: 22°41′49.70″N 114°12′43.90″E

Shenzhen Universiade Sports Centre Stadium
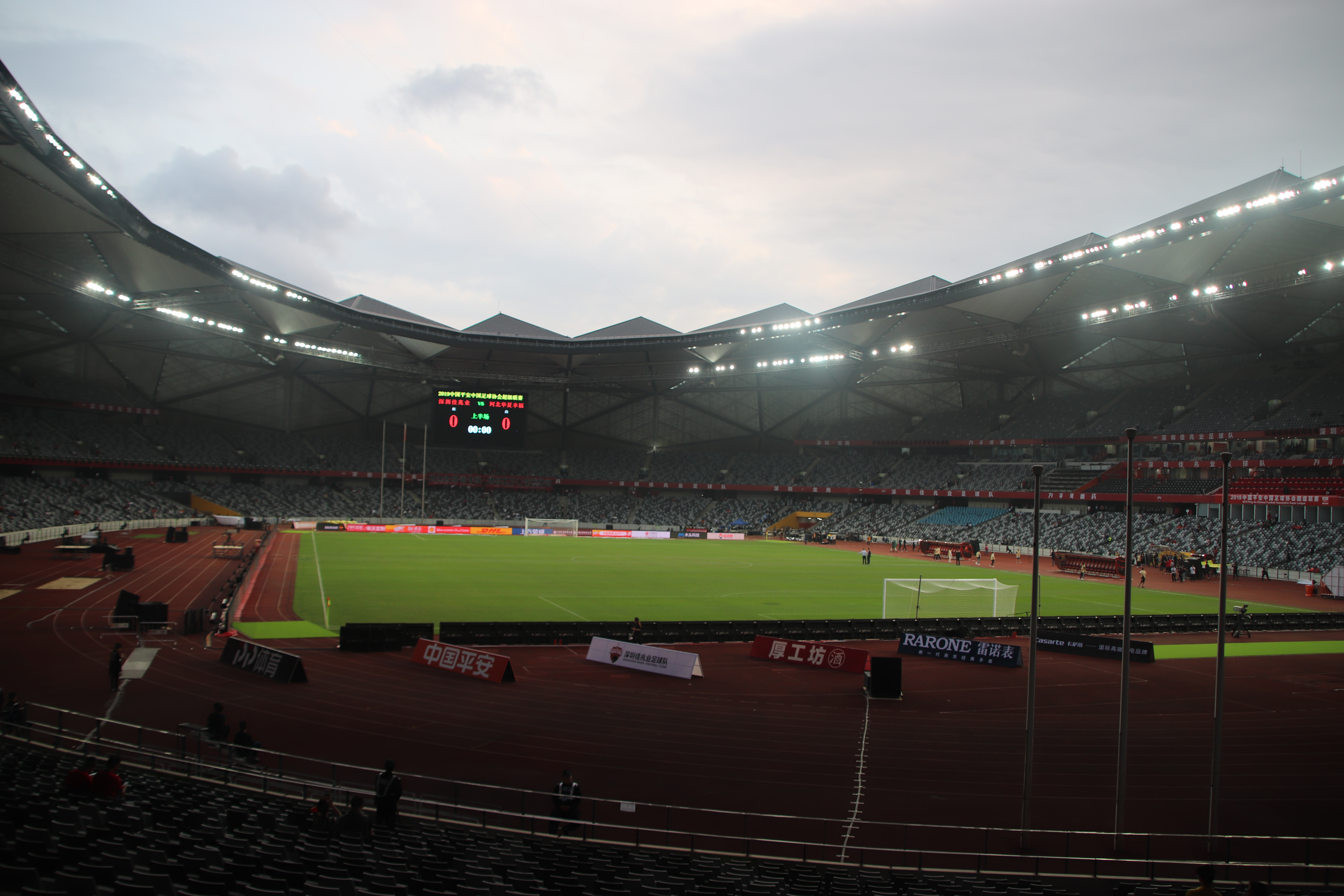
- The main stadium of the Shenzhen Universiade Sports Centre
- Interactive map of Shenzhen Universiade Sports Centre Stadium
- Address: 3001 Longxiang Blvd, Longgang District, Shenzhen, Guangdong, China
- Owner: Shenzhen Municipal People's Government
- Operator: Culture, Media, Tourism and Sports Bureau of Shenzhen Municipality
- Capacity: 60,334 (stadium); 18,000 (gymnasium); 5,000 (cricket); 3,000 (swimming)
- Surface: Grass
- Public transit: Universiade; 3 14 16

Construction
- Opened: 2011
- Cost: 3.5 billion RMB
- Architect: Gerkan, Marg and Partners

Tenants
- Shenzhen F.C. (until 2023); Shenzhen Fengpeng (2012–2013); Shenzhen Leopards (until 2023)

Chinese name
- Simplified Chinese: 深圳大运体育中心
- Traditional Chinese: 深圳大運體育中心
Transcriptions
Standard Mandarin
- Hanyu Pinyin: Shēnzhèn Dàyùn Tǐyù Zhōngxīn
Yue: Cantonese
- Jyutping: sam1 zan3 daai6 wan6 tai2 juk6 zung1 sam1

Longgang Universiade Sports Centre
- Simplified Chinese: 龙岗大运体育中心
- Traditional Chinese: 龍崗大運體育中心
Transcriptions
Standard Mandarin
- Hanyu Pinyin: Lónggǎng Dàyùn Tǐyù Zhōngxīn
Yue: Cantonese
- Jyutping: lung4 gong1 daai6 wan6 tai2 juk6 zung1 sam1

Longgang Stadium
- Simplified Chinese: 龙岗体育场
- Traditional Chinese: 龍崗體育場
Transcriptions
Standard Mandarin
- Hanyu Pinyin: Lónggǎng Tǐyùchǎng
Yue: Cantonese
- Jyutping: lung4 gong1 tai2 juk6 coeng4

Shenzhen Universiade Sports Centre (Chinese: 深圳大运体育中心), also known as Shenzhen Universiade Centre, Longgang Universiade Sports Centre, or Longgang Stadium, is a multi-use sport facilities complex in Longgang, Shenzhen, Guangdong, China. The sports centre was completed in 2011. It is used mostly for association football and athletics competitions, and hosted some events at the 2011 Summer Universiade.

The stadium has a capacity of 60,334 spectators. The Shenzhen Dayun Arena has a capacity of 18,000 spectators, while the aquatic centre has a capacity of 3,000 spectators.

On 15 September 2018, the NHL played one pre-season game at the stadium between the Calgary Flames and Boston Bruins.

The stadium was initially slated to host the Finals of the 2021 League of Legends World Championship, but due to complications related to COVID-19 pandemic in China, the entire event was moved to Iceland.

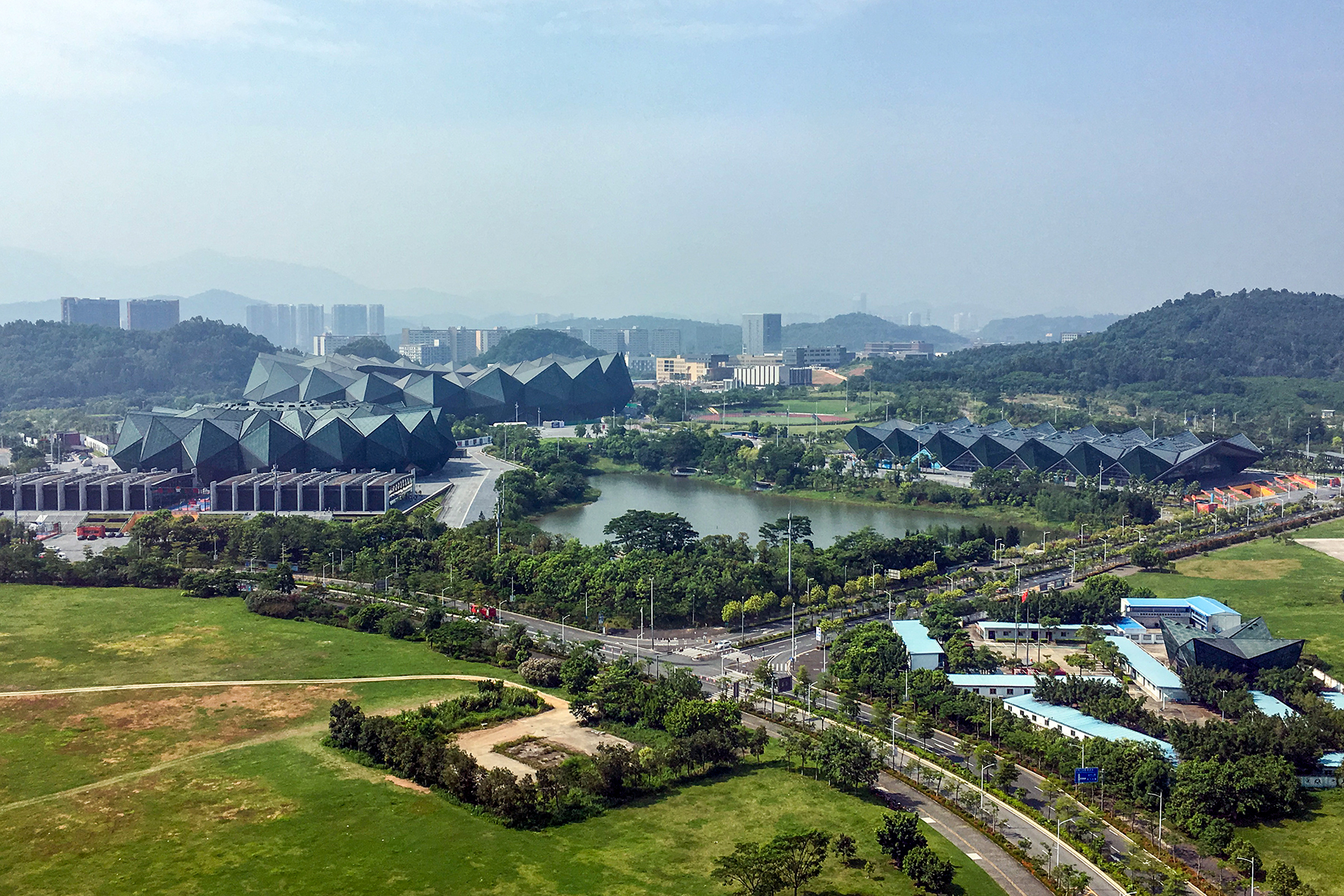
Aerial view of the sports centres
