= Yuanshan Subdistrict =

Subdistrict of Longgang District, Shenzhen, China

Yuanshan Subdistrict 园山街道
- Subdistrict
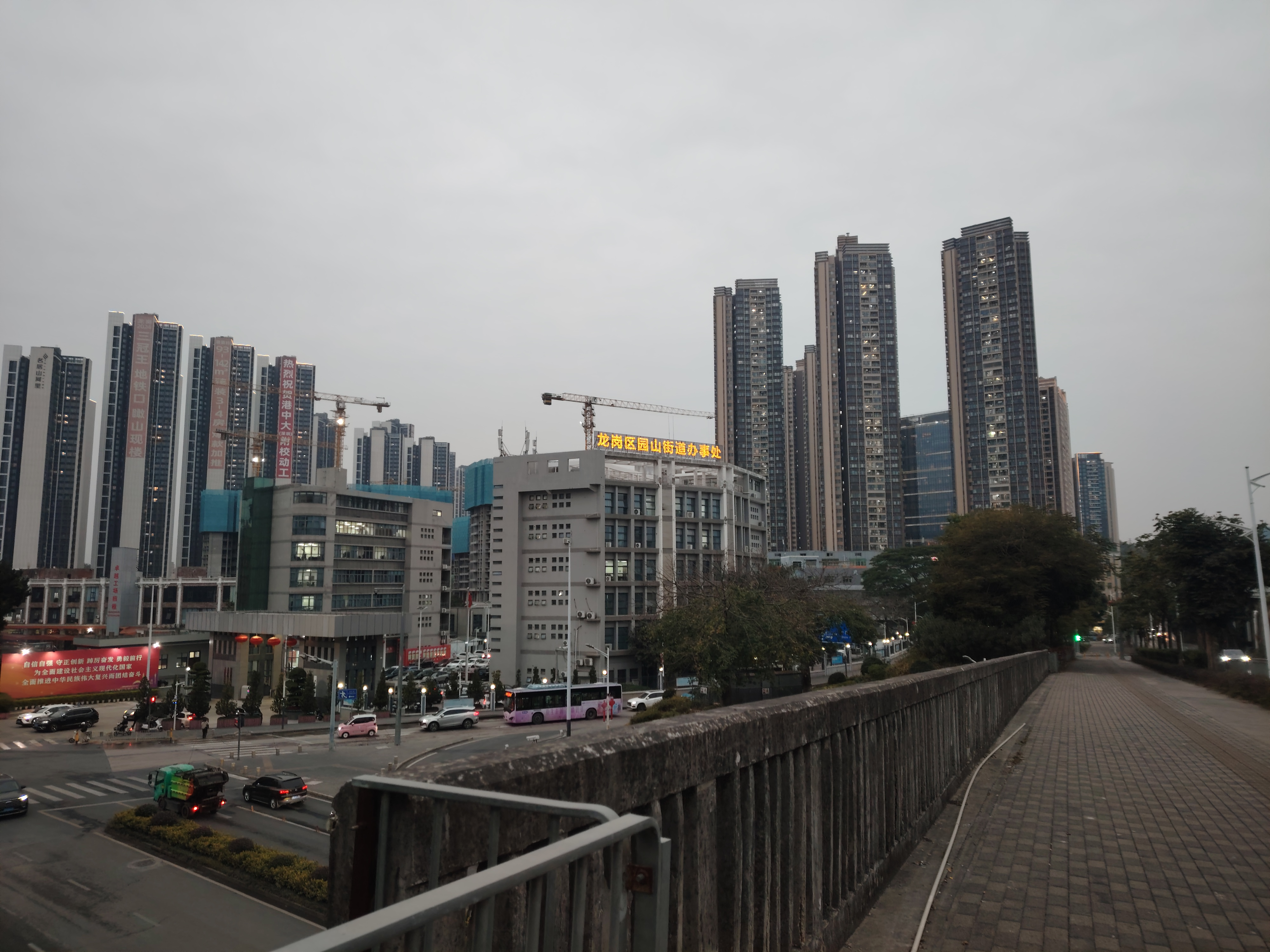
- Yuanshan Subdistrict headquarters
- Interactive map of Yuanshan Subdistrict
- Coordinates: 22.66°N 114.22°E
- Country: People's Republic of China
- Province: Guangdong
- Sub-provincial city: Shenzhen
- District: Longgang District
- Established: 2016-12-26

Area
  - Total: 46.69 km^{2} (18.03 sq mi)

Population (2020 Census)
  - Total: 249,032
  - Estimate (2024-12-31): 253,405
  - Density: 5,334/km^{2} (13,810/sq mi)
- Time zone: UTC+8 (China Standard)
- Postal code: 518100
- Area code: 0755
- Website: Official website

Yuanshan Subdistrict (Chinese: 园山街道; pinyin: Yuánshān jiēdào) is a subdistrict of Longgang District in the eastern part of Shenzhen, China.

== Geography ==
Yuanshan Subdistrict is located in the central part of Longgang District. It borders the subdistricts of Pinghu, Baolong, and Henggang in Longgang District to the northeast, north and west respectively, as well as the districts of Luohu, Shenzhen, Yantian and Pingshan to the southwest, southeast and east respectively. It covers an area of 46.69 square kilometres (18.03 sq mi).

Wutongshan, Shenzhen's highest peak, is located just outside the southern tip of the subdistrict. Wutongshan was designated a National Forest Park in 1984, and a National Scenic and Historic Interest Area in 2009. Yuanshan Forest Park is located in the eastern part of the subdistrict, covering an area of 10.9 square kilometres (4.2 sq mi).

The headwaters of Longgang River, Shenzhen's second largest river, are located in Yuanshan on the northern slopes of Wutongshan. It flows into the Danshui River in Huiyang, which in turn empties into the Xizhi River south of that river's confluence with the Dong River in Huizhou.

== History ==
Two archaeological sites have been found at Xikeng in the southern part of Yuanshan Subdistrict: the Shidulong (Chinese: 石肚龙) site dating to the Western Zhou and Eastern Zhou periods, and the Leigongkeng (Chinese: 雷公坑) site dating to the Eastern Zhou period. The first documented resident in the area is Chen Kangshi (Chinese: 陈康适, 1160–1185), a salt official who founded the village of He'ao (Chinese: 荷坳) in the Chunxi era of the Southern Song dynasty. He'ao is the oldest village in Yuanshan Subdistrict that still survives today.

Hakka people migrated to the Longgang area during the reign of Kangxi, after the rescinding of the Great Clearance edicts, and became the majority ethnic group in the area. The local economy was traditionally agricultural, primarily producing rice, peanuts, longan and lychee, along with some tubers and sugarcane. Wilhelm Lobscheid of the Rhenish Missionary Society visited He'ao in 1855.

In He'ao, electricity became available in the 1950s, telephone service in 1957, and running water in the early 1960s. A coal mine operated in He'ao from 1959 to 1975. The local villages started building factories for rent in the mid-1980s after Shenzhen became a special economic zone. The Shenmao cement factory (Chinese: 深茂水泥厂) operated in the village of Dakang from 1984 to 1998, exploiting a nearby limestone deposit.

Yuanshan Subdistrict was created at the end of 2016, when it was separated from Henggang Subdistrict.

== Administration ==
Yuanshan Subdistrict is divided into the six residential communities (Chinese: 社区; pinyin: shèqū) of Anliang (Chinese: 安良), Bao'an (Chinese: 保安), Dakang (Chinese: 大康), He'ao (Chinese: 荷坳), Xikeng (Chinese: 西坑) and Yinhe (Chinese: 银荷).

== Demographics ==
Yuanshan Subdistrict recorded a population of 249,032 in the 2020 Chinese census. At the end of 2024 its population was estimated at 253,405, of which the residential hukou population totalled an estimated 36,581.

== Economy ==
Manufacturing in Yuanshan Subdistrict has grown beyond the area's original strengths in the eyewear, jewellery, plastics and printing industries, and into its present focus on ICT devices. Since 2014, Longgang District has been building an industrial park named Apollo Future Industry City in Yuanshan, focusing on emerging technologies such as artificial intelligence, electric vehicles, low-altitude flight (i.e., UAVs), and smartglasses.

== Infrastructure ==
Yuanshan Subdistrict is served by Line 3, Line 14, and Line 16 of the Shenzhen Metro. These three subway lines interchange at Universiade station, where the Shenzhen–Dayawan intercity railway currently under construction will also have a stop; and this hub will anchor transit-oriented development in the area. The Hangzhou–Fuzhou–Shenzhen railway and the freight-only Pingyan railway also run through Yuanshan, although only the latter has a station in the subdistrict at Xikeng.

Yuanshan is served by several expressways:

- G15 Shenyang–Haikou Expressway
- G0422 Wuhan–Shenzhen Expressway
- Shenzhen Eastern Transit Expressway
- Shuiguan Expressway
- Nanping Expressway

China National Highway 205 (i.e., Longgang Boulevard) also runs through the subdistrict.

The lower reservoir of the Shenzhen Pumped Storage Power Station (Chinese: 深圳抽水蓄能电站), operational since September 2018, is located in the subdistrict.
