= Liuyue station =

Metro station in Shenzhen, China

Liuyue 六约
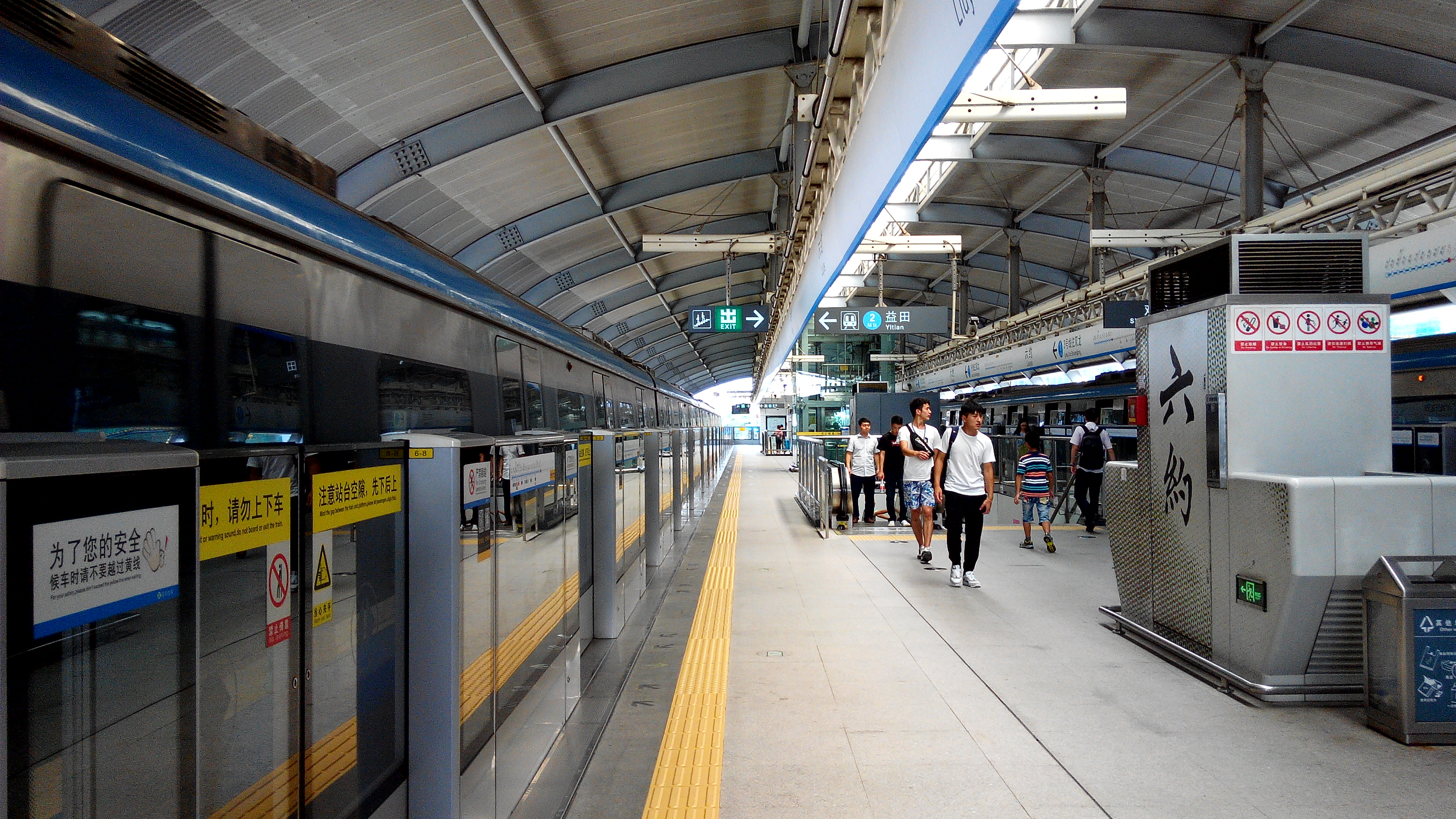
- Platform

General information
- Location: Longgang District, Shenzhen, Guangdong; China
- Coordinates: 22°38′3″N 114°10′49″E
- Operated by: Shenzhen Metro Line 3 Operations
- Line: Line 3
- Platforms: 2 (1 island platform)
- Tracks: 2

Construction
- Structure type: Elevated
- Accessible: Yes

History
- Opened: 28 December 2010 (15 years ago)

Services
Preceding station	Shenzhen Metro	Following station
Tangkeng towards Pingdi Liulian	Line 3	Danzhutou towards Futian Bonded Area
Location

Liuyue station (Chinese: 六约站; pinyin: Liùyuē Zhàn) is a station of Line 3, Shenzhen Metro. It opened on 28 December 2010. It is located in Shenhui Road near Shenkeng Village.

== Station layout ==
3F; Platforms	Platform	3 towards Futian Bonded Area (Danzhutou)
3F; Platforms	Island platform, doors will open on the left
3F; Platforms	Platform	3 towards Pingdi Liulian (Tangkeng)
2F; Concourse	Lobby	Ticket Machines, Customer Service, Shops, Vending Machines
G	-	Exits A & C

== Exits ==
Exit		Destination
Exit A		Shenhui Road (S), Longgang Boulevard (S), Niushipu Road, Henggang Station
Exit C	C	Longgang Blvd (N), Wutong Road
Exit C	C1	Shenhui Road North, Shenzhu Road
Exit C	C2	Wutong Road
Exit C	C3	Wutong Road
Exit C	C4	Shunfa Road
