= Tangkeng station (Shenzhen Metro) =

Metro station in Shenzhen, Guangdong, China

Tangkeng 塘坑
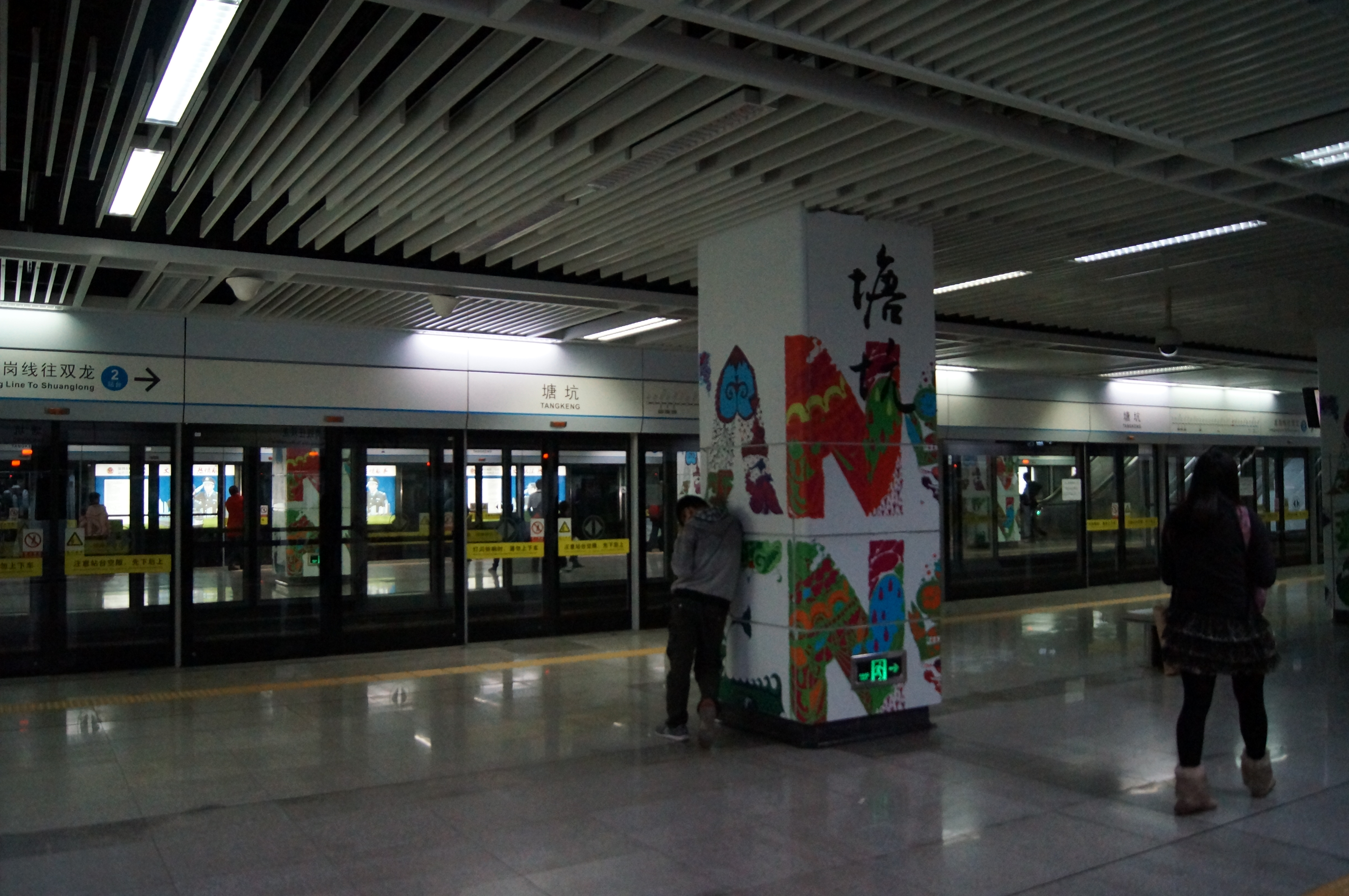
- Platform

General information
- Location: Luohu District, Shenzhen, Guangdong; China
- Coordinates: 22°38′23″N 114°11′33″E
- Operator: Shenzhen Metro Line 3 Operations
- Line: Line 3
- Platforms: 4 (2 island platforms)
- Tracks: 3

Construction
- Structure type: Underground
- Accessible: Yes

History
- Opened: 28 December 2010 (15 years ago)

Services
Preceding station	Shenzhen Metro	Following station
Henggang towards Pingdi Liulian	Line 3	Liuyue towards Futian Bonded Area
Location

Tangkeng station (Chinese: 塘坑站) is a station of Shenzhen Metro Line 3. It opened on 28 December 2010. It is an underground station located below Shenhui Road.

== Station layout ==
G Concourse	Lobby	Ticket Machines, Customer Service, Shops, Vending Machines, Exits A-D
B1F; Platforms	Platform	3 towards Futian Bonded Area (Liuyue)
B1F; Platforms	Island platform, doors will open on the left or right
B1F; Platforms	Platform ↑	3 A.M peak towards Huaxin (Liuyue); 3 towards Futian Bonded Area (Liuyue); 3 termination platform
B1F; Platforms	Platform ↓	3 A.M peak termination platform 3 towards Pingdi Liulian (Henggang)
B1F; Platforms	Island platform, doors will open on the left or right
B1F; Platforms	Platform	3 towards Pingdi Liulian (Henggang)

== Exits ==
Exit	Destination
Exit A	Shenhui Road (S), Liuhe Road
Exit B	Shenhui Road (S), Tangkeng Road
Exit C	Shenhui Road (S), Longgang Boulevard (E), Kangle Road, Henggang Rainbow Shopping Mall, Overpass
Exit D	Shenhui Road (S), Longgang Boulevard (E), Xinghe Road
