= He'ao station =

Metro station in Shenzhen, China

He'ao 荷坳
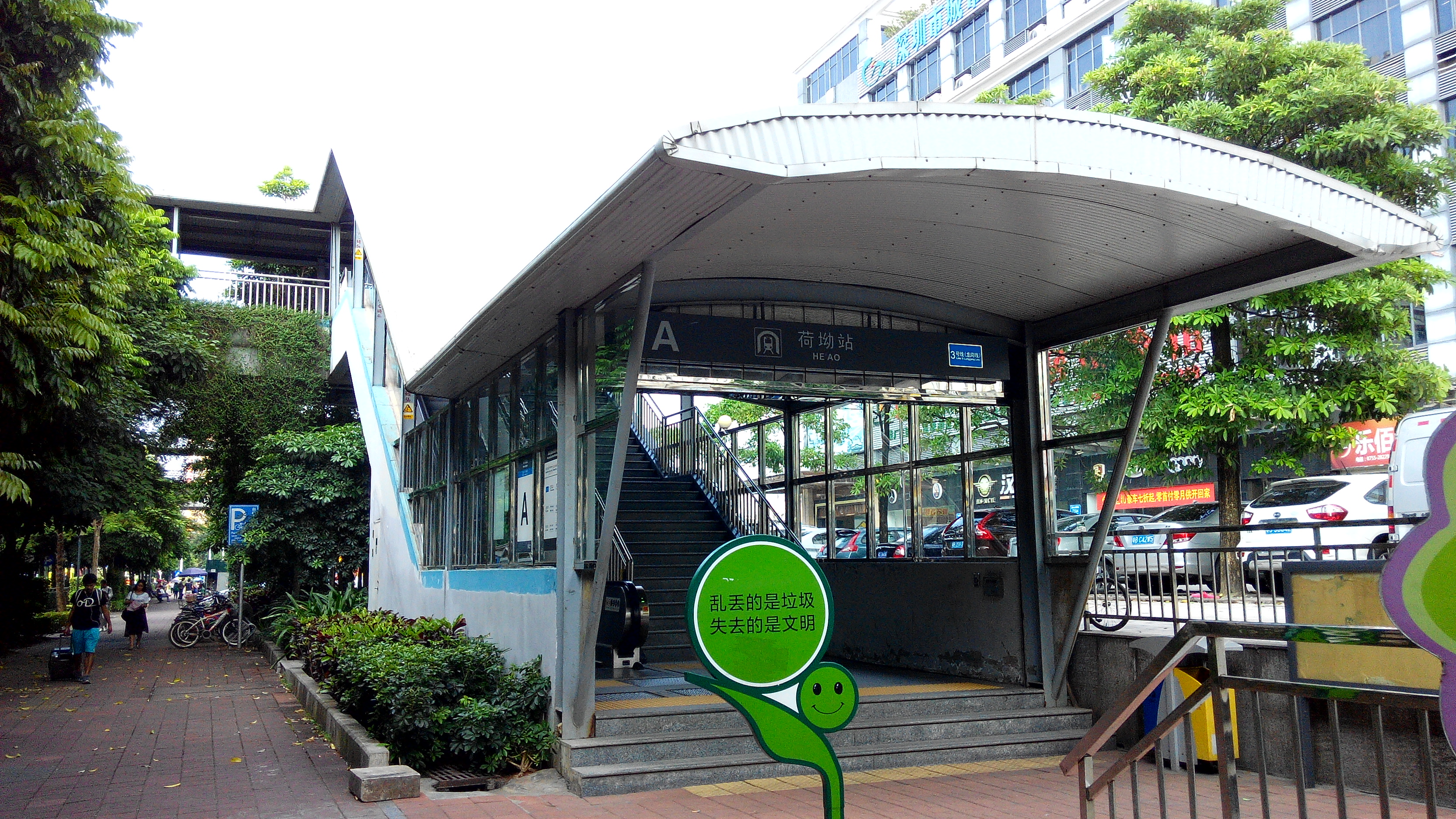
- Exit A

General information
- Location: Longgang District, Shenzhen, Guangdong; China
- Coordinates: 22°40′23″N 114°13′28″E
- Operator: Shenzhen Metro Line 3 Operations
- Line: Line 3
- Platforms: 2 (1 island platform)
- Tracks: 2

Construction
- Structure type: Elevated
- Accessible: Yes

History
- Opened: 28 December 2010 (15 years ago)

Services
Preceding station	Shenzhen Metro	Following station
Universiade towards Pingdi Liulian	Line 3	Yonghu towards Futian Checkpoint
Location

He'ao station (Chinese: 荷坳站; pinyin: Hé'ào Zhàn) is a station on Line 3 of the Shenzhen Metro. It is located in Shenhui Road, and opened on 28 December 2010.

== Station layout ==
3F; Platforms	Platform	3 towards Futian Bonded Area (Yonghu)
3F; Platforms	Island platform, doors will open on the left
3F; Platforms	Platform	3 towards Pingdi Liulian (Universiade)
2F; Concourse	Lobby	Ticket Machines, Customer Service, Shops, Vending Machines
G	-	Exits A-D

== Exits ==
Exit	Destination
Exit A	Shenhui Road (S), Longgang Boulevard (S), Hekang City, Crystal City, Xinyi Auto CentreHekang Road
Exit B	Shenhui Road (S), Longgang Boulevard (S), Henggang People's Court of Longgang District, Changjiangpu Industrial Area, He'ao Police Station, He'ao Expressway Road Crossing, Longgang Vehicle Administration Office, Henggang Intercity Bus
Exit C	Shenhui Road (N), Longgang Boulevard (N), Xinlian Roadhui Road (N), Liantai Road, He'ao Community, He'ao Xincun, Lecheng Estate
Exit D	Shenhui Road (N), Longgang Boulevard (N), Xinlian Road, Aobei Road, Dasheng Auto Company
