= China South City Holdings =

Hong Kong incorporated holding company

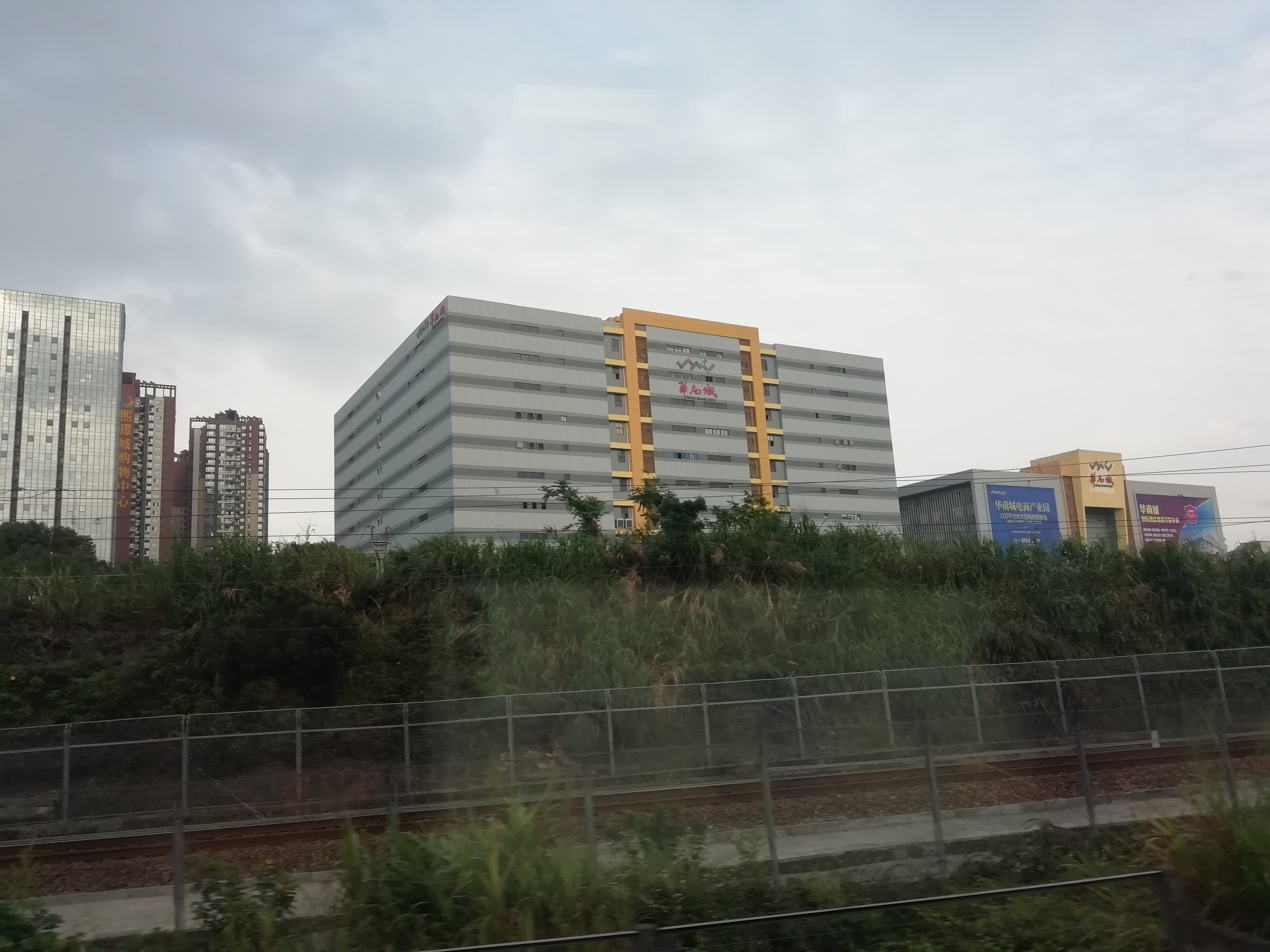
China South City, located in Pinghu, Shenzhen

China South International Industrial Materials City (Shenzhen) Co., Ltd. ("China South City" Holdings; Chinese: 华南国际工业原料城（深圳）有限公司 (SEHK: 1668)), a Hong Kong incorporated holding company, is a Longgang District, Shenzhen-based integrated logistics and trade center operator. It manages logistics operations and a wholesale shopping center in the city.

== Business areas ==
China South City is engaged in the development and management of China South International Industrial Materials City, located at Pinghu, Shenzhen in the Greater Pearl River Delta region. China South City is the largest trade center in China, in terms of gross floor area, that combines trade centers for industrial materials of five major industries, namely, textile and clothing materials; leather and accessories; electronics and accessories; printing, paper products and packaging materials; and metals, chemicals and plastic materials. It is expected to be the largest industrial materials trade center in the world upon completion of the second phase.

China South City provides a wholesale trading platform that brings together buyers and sellers of a range of industrial materials, and complements the global logistics supply chain in different manufacturing industries by having trading and exhibition centers for suppliers in one location.

China South City Holdings listed on the Hong Kong Stock Exchange on September 30, 2009.

On 11 August 2025, the company was wound up by the High Court of Hong Kong.
