= Ailian station =

Metro station in Shenzhen, China

Ailian 爱联
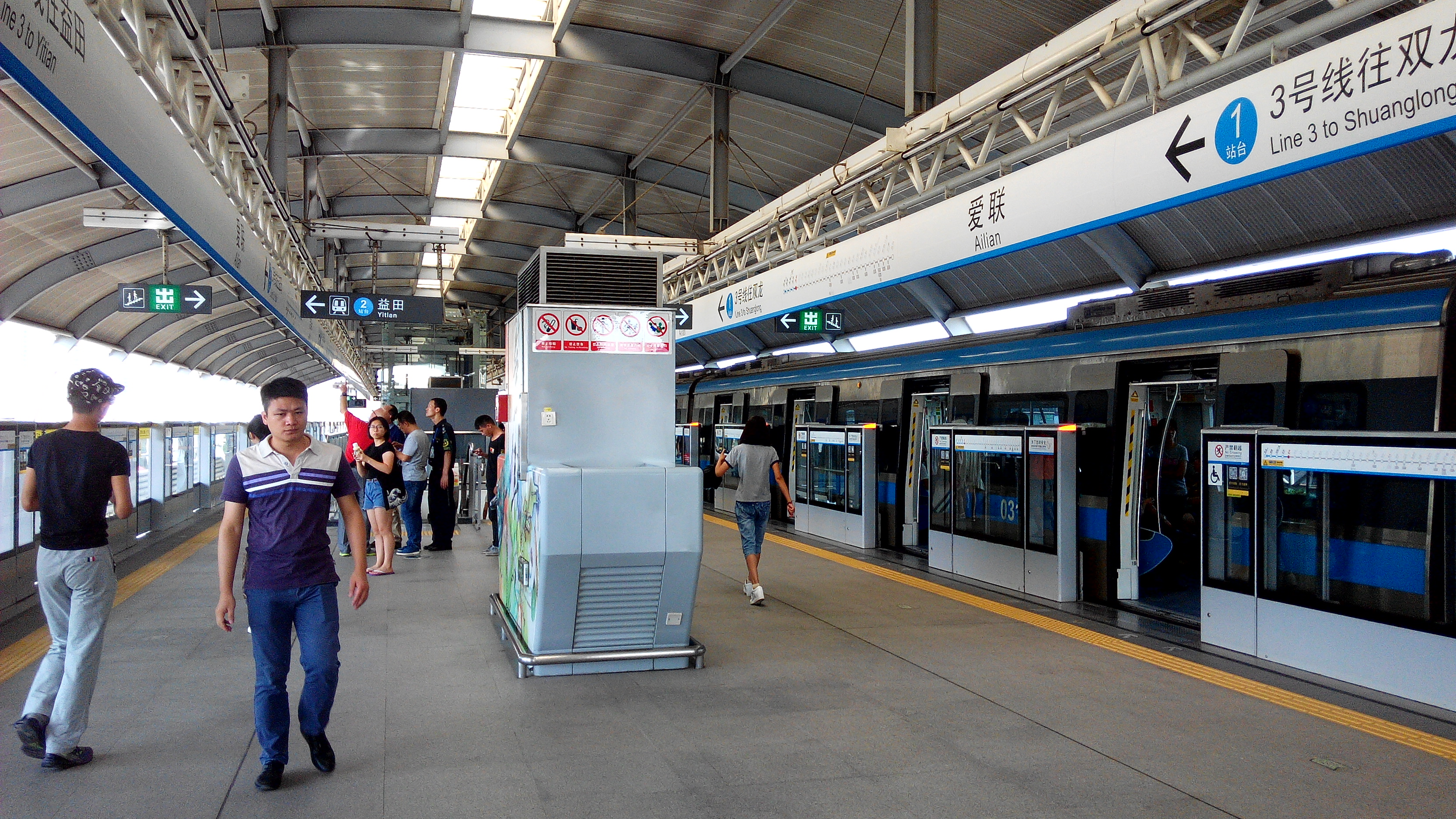
- Platform

General information
- Location: Longgang District, Shenzhen, Guangdong; China
- Coordinates: 22°41′50″N 114°14′1″E
- Operator: Shenzhen Metro Line 3 Operations
- Line: Line 3
- Platforms: 2 (1 island platform)
- Tracks: 2

Construction
- Structure type: Elevated
- Accessible: Yes

History
- Opened: 28 December 2010 (15 years ago)

Services
| Preceding station | Shenzhen Metro | Following station |
|---|---|---|
| Universiade towards Futian Bonded Area | Line 3 | Jixiang towards Pingdi Liulian |
Location

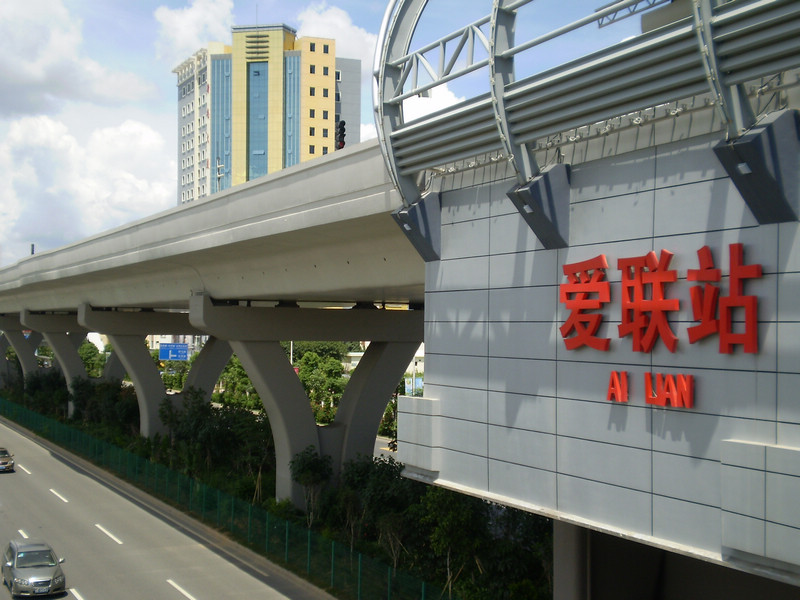
Exterior view

Ailian station (Chinese: 爱联站) is a metro station on Line 3 of the Shenzhen Metro. It opened on 28 December 2010. It is located on Shenhui Road.

== Station layout ==
| 3F; Platforms | Platform | 3 towards Futian Bonded Area (Universiade) |
| 3F; Platforms | Island platform, doors will open on the left |
| 3F; Platforms | Platform | 3 towards Pingdi Liulian (Jixiang) |
| 2F; Concourse | Lobby | Ticket Machines, Customer Service, Shops, Vending Machines |
| G | - | Exits A-D |

== Exits ==
| Exit | Destination |
|---|---|
| Exit A | Shenhui Road (S), Longgang Boulevard (S), Ruyi South Road, Ailian Secondary Market, Ailian Stock Building, Ailian Police Station, Ailian Kindergarten, Ailian Overpass, Ailian Post Office |
| Exit B | Shenhui Road (S), Longgang Boulevard (S), Chuangzhao Plaza, Pupai Road |
| Exit C | Shenhui Road (N), Longgang Boulevard (N), Ailian Primary School, Chenguang Road, Longcheng Hospital |
| Exit D | Shenhui Road (N), Longgang Boulevard (N), Ruyi Middle Road, Aihua Road, Changsheng Department Store, Xiongli Hotel, Huanglong Hotel, Ailian Overpass, Shenzhen Rural Commercial Bank, Longcheng Huafu, Retired Cadre's Entertainment Centre |
