= Shenzhen MSU–BIT University =

University in Shenzhen, Guangdong, China

- 深圳北理莫斯科大学 (Chinese); Университет МГУ-ППИ в Шэньчжэне (Russian)
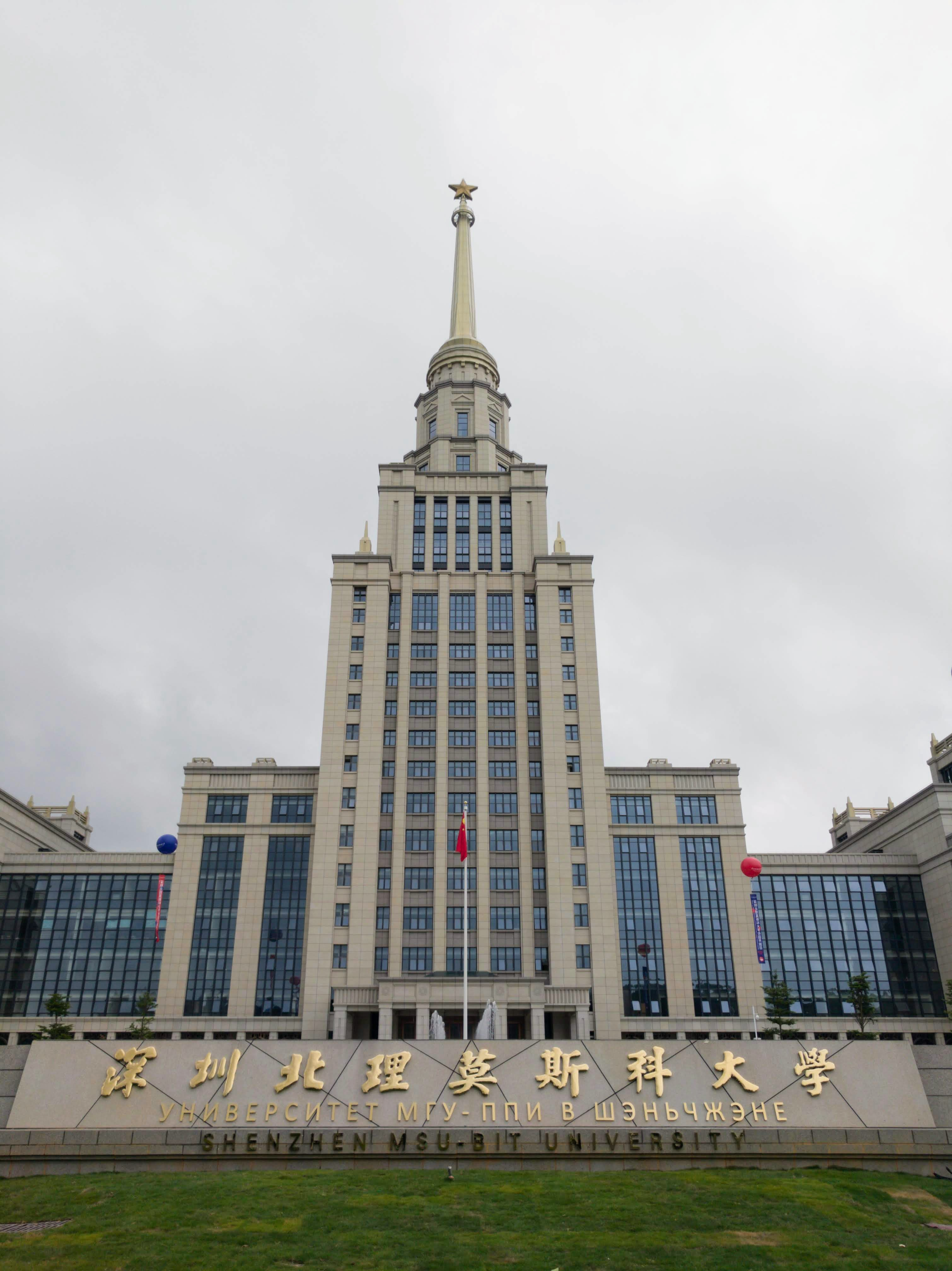
- Main entrance of Shenzhen MSU–BIT University
- Type: Sino-foreign cooperative university
- Established: 2016; 10 years ago
- Affiliations: Lomonosov Moscow State University; Beijing Institute of Technology
- Students: 4,500
- Location: Shenzhen, Guangdong, China; 22°41′24″N 114°12′29″E
- Language: Russian; Chinese; English
- Website: smbu.edu.cn en.smbu.edu.cn

Chinese name
- Simplified Chinese: 深圳北理莫斯科大学
- Traditional Chinese: 深圳北理莫斯科大學
Transcriptions
Standard Mandarin
- Hanyu Pinyin: Shēnzhèn Běilǐ Mòsīkē Dàxué

Russian name
- Russian: Университет МГУ-ППИ в Шэньчжэне

Shenzhen MSU–BIT University (SMBU) is a Sino-foreign cooperative university located in Longgang, Shenzhen, Guangdong, China. It was established in 2016 as a joint venture between Beijing Institute of Technology and Moscow State University, with financial support from the Shenzhen Municipal Government.

== History ==
The university received an investment of 2.04 billion yuan (US$318 million) from the local government. Legal adjustments were made to the Russian Federal Law to allow the establishment of the university.

On 13 September 2017, the university officially opened with participation from vice premiers of China and Russia, Olga Golodets and Liu Yandong, as well as delegations from both founding universities.

SMBU is the first Sino-Russian cooperative university, the ninth Sino-foreign university in China, and the second Sino-foreign university in Shenzhen. It is a member of the Sino-foreign Cooperative University Union.

== Campus ==
The campus is located in southwest Longgang, Shenzhen, covering approximately 34 hectares. Its main building is modeled after the iconic Moscow State University structure.

The faculty is composed largely of scholars from Lomonosov Moscow State University, many holding Doctor of Sciences degrees from Russia. Classes are taught in Russian, English, and Chinese.

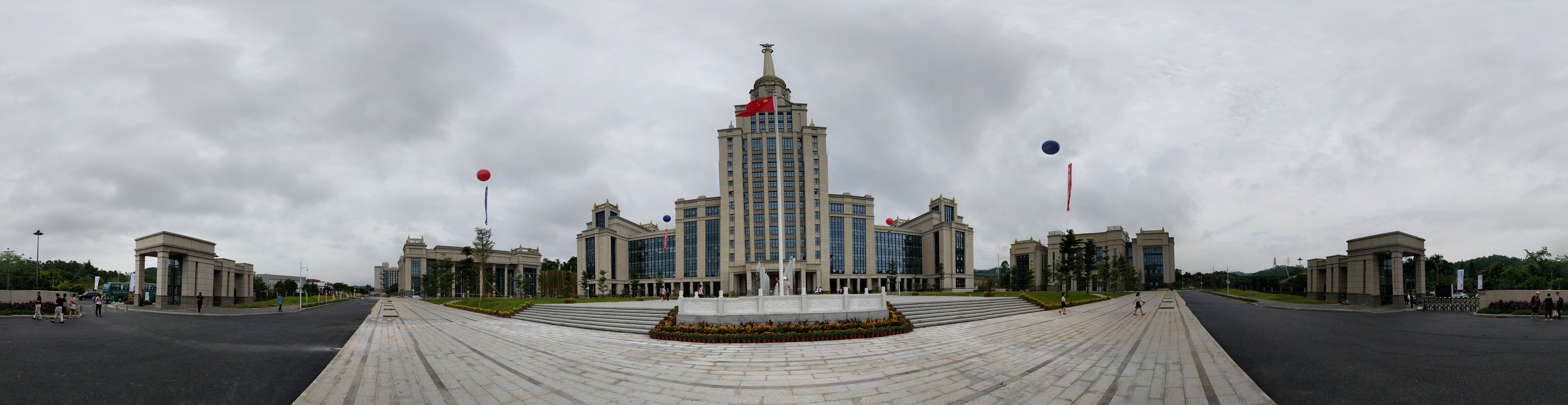
Panoramic view of the SMBU campus

== Academic Departments ==
SMBU offers bachelor's, master's, and doctoral programs through six faculties:

- Faculty of Philology – bachelor's, master's, and doctoral programs (Russian)
- Faculty of Biology – bachelor's and doctoral programs (Russian); master's program (English)
- Faculty of Materials Science – bachelor's and master's programs (Russian)
- Faculty of Chemistry – bachelor's and master's programs (Russian)
- Faculty of Computational Mathematics and Cybernetics – bachelor's and master's programs (Russian)
- Faculty of Economics – bachelor's and master's programs (Russian)
