= Henggang station =

Metro station in Shenzhen, China

Henggang 横岗
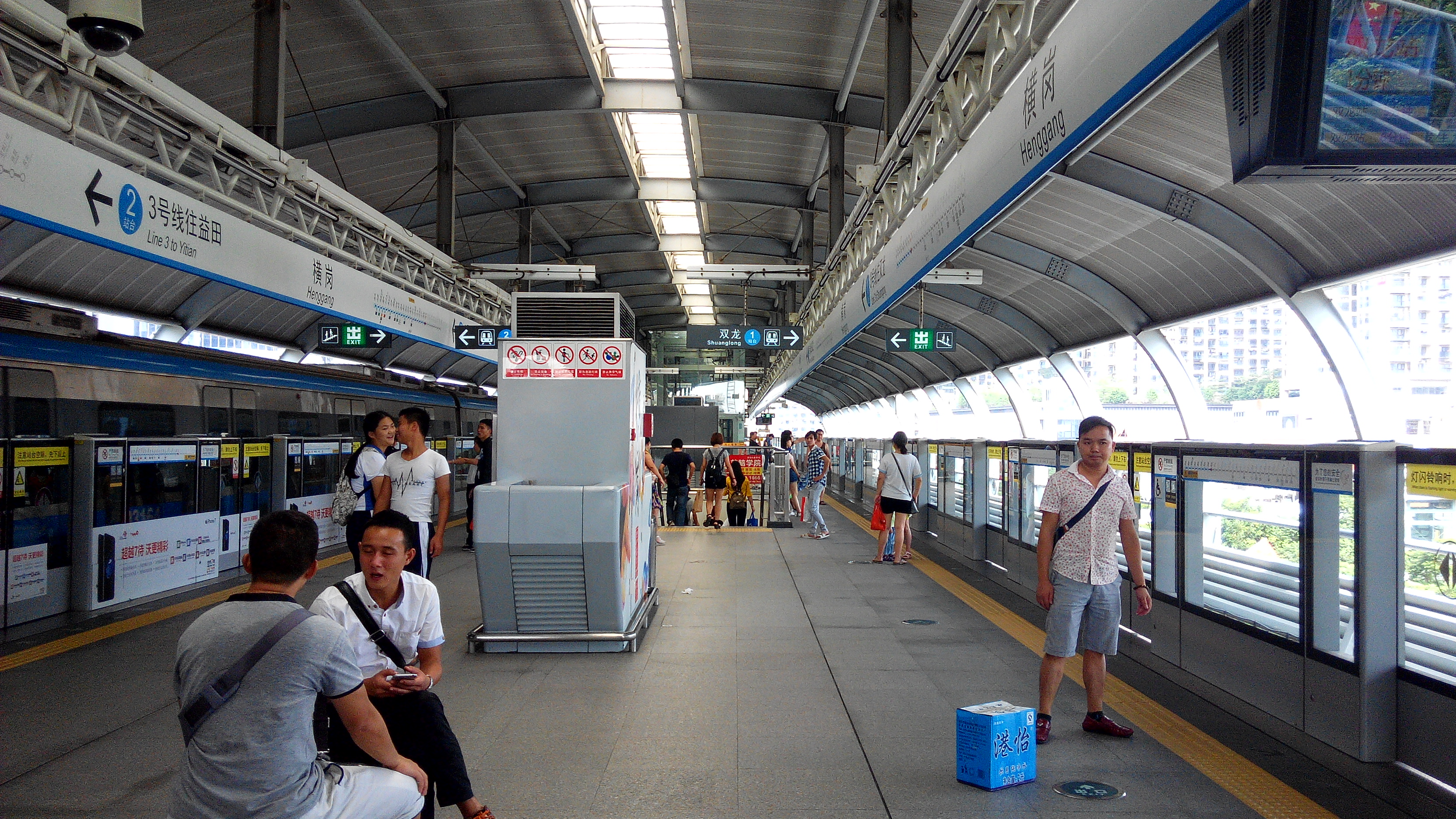
- Platform

General information
- Location: Longgang District, Shenzhen, Guangdong; China
- Coordinates: 22°38′55″N 114°12′32″E
- Operator: Shenzhen Metro Line 3 Operations
- Line: Line 3
- Platforms: 2 (1 island platform)
- Tracks: 2

Construction
- Structure type: Elevated
- Accessible: Yes

History
- Opened: 28 December 2010 (15 years ago)

Services
Preceding station	Shenzhen Metro	Following station
Yonghu towards Pingdi Liulian	Line 3	Tangkeng towards Futian Bonded Area
Location

Henggang station (Chinese: 横岗站; pinyin: Hénggǎng Zhàn) is a station on Line 3 of the Shenzhen Metro. It opened on 28 December 2010. It is located between Shenhui Road and Baokang Road.

== Station layout ==
3F; Platforms	Platform	3 towards Futian Bonded Area (Tangkeng)
3F; Platforms	Island platform, doors will open on the left
3F; Platforms	Platform	3 towards Pingdi Liulian (Yonghu)
2F; Concourse	Lobby	Ticket Machines, Customer Service, Shops, Vending Machines
G	-	Exits A-D

== Exits ==
Exit	Destination
Exit A	Shenhui Road (S), Longgang Boulevard (S), Songbai Road
Exit B	Shenhui Road (S), Longgang Boulevard (S), Baokang Road (E)
Exit C	Shenhui Road (N), Longgang Boulevard (N), Baokang Road (W)
Exit D	Shenhui Road (N), Longgang Boulevard (N), Maosheng Road
