= Egongling River =

River in People's Republic of China

Egongling River is located in the Longgang District in China.
