= Longcheng High School =

High school in Shenzhen, China

Longcheng High School 龙城高级中学
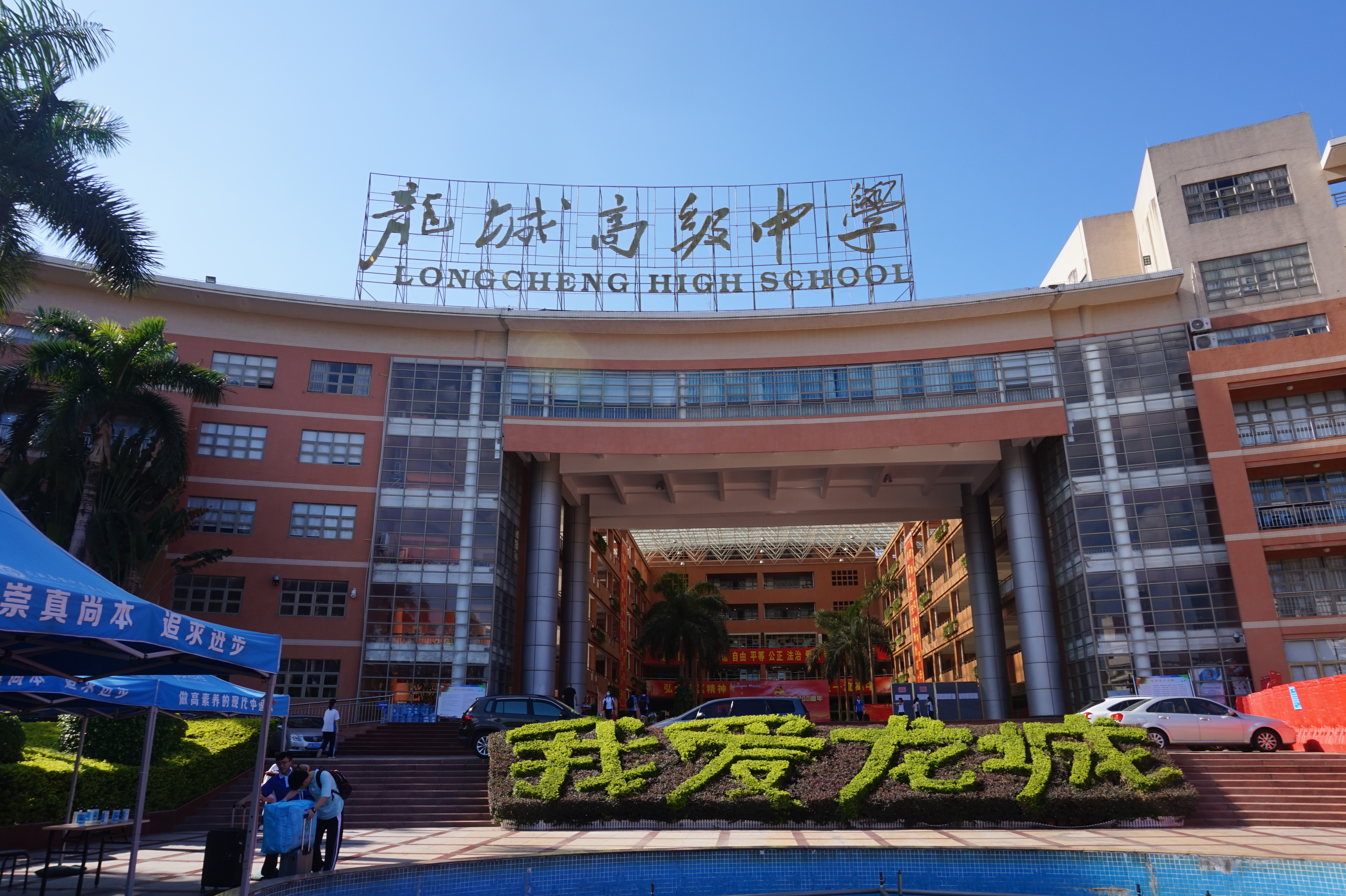

Location
- 154 Huangge North Rd, Longgang District; Shenzhen, Guangdong; PRC
- Coordinates: 22.7310339°N 114.2131817°E

Information
- Former name: 龙城中学
- Type: High School
- Motto: 做高素养的现代中国人
- Established: 1995
- Principal: 姚亮
- Language: Chinese, English, Japanese
- Campus size: 53, 478 m^{2}
- Website: szlcgjzx.szlgedu.org.cn

Longcheng High School
- Traditional Chinese: 龍城高級中學
- Simplified Chinese: 龙城高级中学
Transcriptions
Standard Mandarin
- Hanyu Pinyin: Lóngchéng Gāojízhōngxué
Yue: Cantonese
- Jyutping: lung4 sing4 gou1 kap1 zung1 hok6

LongCheng High School (Chinese: 龙城高级中学) is a senior high school in Longgang district, Shenzhen. Located in the south of the Qinglingjing Forest Park, it is the largest school in area in Shenzhen.

== History ==
Founded in 1995, it was previously named "Longcheng middle school". In 2004, the junior division and the senior division were separated into two individual schools, "Longcheng junior high school" and "Longcheng senior high school".
