= Dapeng New Area =

Coordinates: 22.5969°N 114.4749°E

Dapeng 大鹏新区
- New District
- Dapeng New Area
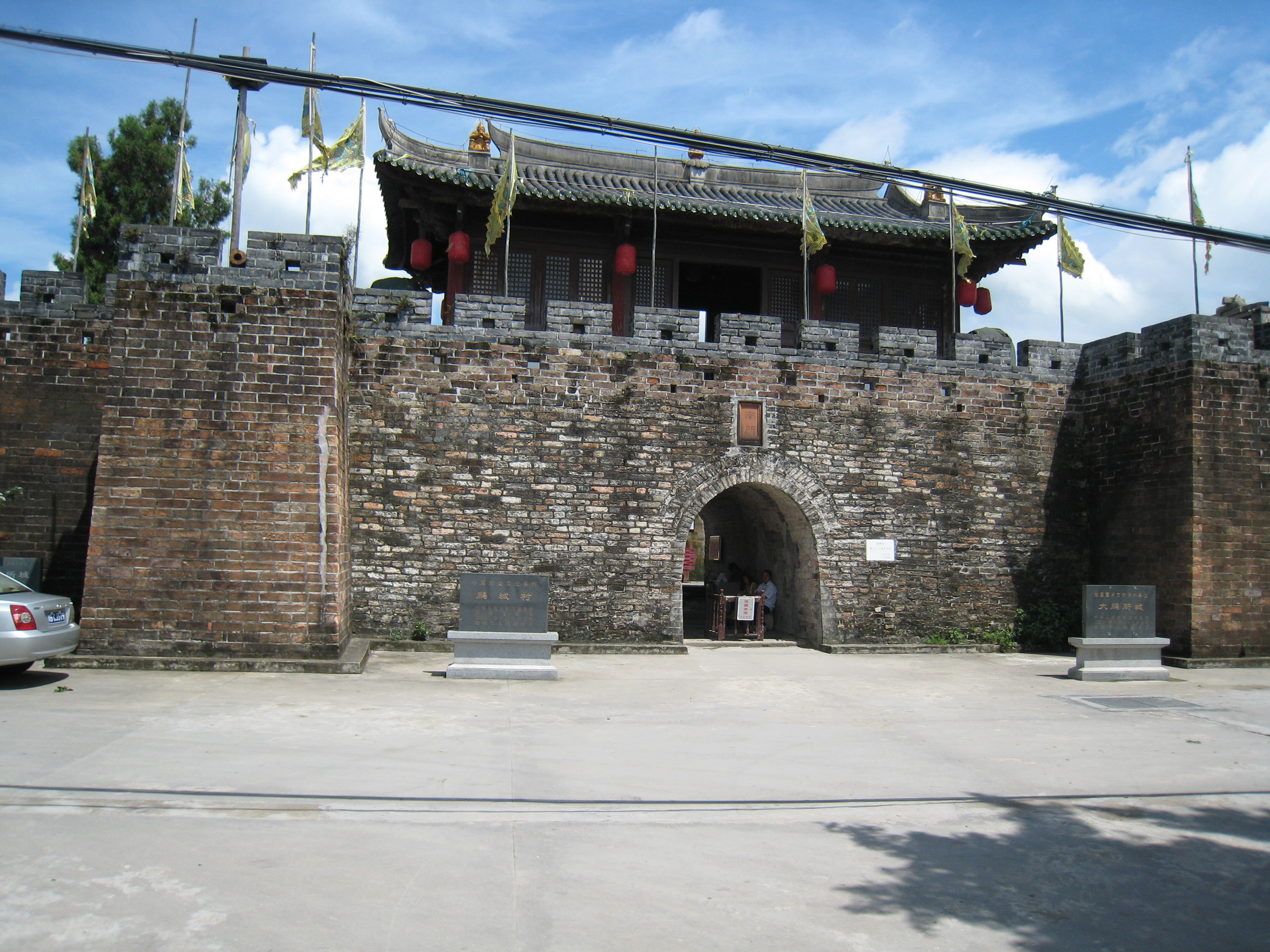
- Dapeng Fortress

- Dapeng (highlighted in brown) in Shenzhen
- Interactive map of Dapeng
- Country: People's Republic of China
- Province: Guangdong
- Sub-provincial city: Shenzhen

Area
  - Total: 294 km^{2} (114 sq mi)

Population (2020)
  - Total: 156,236
  - Density: 531/km^{2} (1,380/sq mi)
- Time zone: UTC+8 (China Standard)
- Website: www.dpxq.gov.cn

Dapeng New Area
- Simplified Chinese: 大鹏新区
- Traditional Chinese: 大鵬新區
- Guangdong Romanization: dai6 pang4 sen1 kêu1
- Hanyu Pinyin: Dàpéng Xīn Qū
Transcriptions
Standard Mandarin
- Hanyu Pinyin: Dàpéng Xīn Qū
Yue: Cantonese
- Yale Romanization: Daaihpàahng Sān Kēui
- Jyutping: daai6 paang4 san1 keoi1
- Canton Romanization: dai6 pang4 sen1 kêu1

Alternative Chinese name
- Simplified Chinese: 大鹏
- Traditional Chinese: 大鵬
- Guangdong Romanization: dai6 pang4
- Hanyu Pinyin: Dàpéng
Transcriptions
Standard Mandarin
- Hanyu Pinyin: Dàpéng
Yue: Cantonese
- Yale Romanization: Daaihpàahng
- Jyutping: daai6 paang4
- Canton Romanization: dai6 pang4

Dapeng New Area (大鹏新区, Dàpéng Xīn Qū) is an administrative area under the jurisdiction of Longgang, Shenzhen, Guangdong. It has a land area of 294.18 square kilometres (113.58 sq mi), a coastline of 133.22 kilometres (82.78 mi) and a total population of about 160,000. The district was created on 30 December 2011 with its administration center located on 5 Dapeng Street, Zhongshan Road.

== Administrative divisions ==
The jurisdiction of Dapeng New District includes all of the Dapeng Peninsula, formerly divided into the three subdistricts of Dapeng, Kuichong and Nan'ao, with a total of 25 neighborhoods.

| Name | Chinese (S) | Hanyu Pinyin | Canton Romanization | Population (2010) | Area (km^{2}) |
|---|---|---|---|---|---|
| Dapeng Subdistrict | 大鹏街道 | Dàpéng Jiēdào | dai6 pang4 gai1 dou6 | 46,867 | 82.81 |
| Kuichong Subdistrict | 葵涌街道 | Kuíchōng Jiēdào | kuei4 cung1 gai1 dou6 | 61,105 | 103.90 |
| Nan'ao Subdistrict | 南澳街道 | Nán'ào Jiēdào | nam4 ou3 gai1 dou6 | 18,588 | 115.06 |

== Travel ==
Dapeng New District's coastline features beaches, islands, reefs, sea cliffs, caves, bridges, columns and other maritime landforms. It has been called the most beautiful coastal scenery in Guangdong, and is known as the Pearl of Shenzhen and Oriental Hawaii. The Nan'ao coastal area is popular with tourists as well as local fishermen while the two islands of Sanmen and Laishi consist of aboriginal scenery. Local scenic attraction Xichong is also located in the district being noted for its undeveloped beach.

== Produce ==
Dapeng is rich in fresh seafood, especially in Dapeng Bay known for its all year round availability of seafood.

== Education ==
Secondary schools ("middle schools"):

- Dapeng Overseas Chinese Middle School (大鹏华侨中学) in Dapeng Subdistrict
- Kuichong Middle School (葵涌中学) in Kuichong Subdistrict
- Nan'ao Middle School (南澳中学) in Nan'ao Subdistrict,
- Shenzhen School (High School) Affiliated to Renmin University of China (人大附中深圳学校) in Kuichong Subdistrict

Nine-year schools (elementary and junior high schools):

- Shenzhen Yadi School (亚迪学校) in Kuichong Town
- Buxin School (布新学校) in Dapeng Sub-district
- Xingyu School (星宇学校) in Gaoyuan Community, Kuichong Subdistrict
- Shenzhen School Affiliated to Renmin University of China (人大附中深圳学校), Kuichong Subdistrict

Primary schools:

- Shenzhen Dapeng Central Primary School (深圳市大鹏新区大鹏中心小学) - Dapeng Subdistrict
- Shenzhen Dapeng No. 2 Primary School (深圳市大鹏新区大鹏第二小学) - Dapeng
- Kuichong Central Primary School (葵涌中心小学) - Kuichong
- Kuichong No. 2 Primary School (葵涌第二小学) - Kuichong Subdistrict
- Xichong Primary School (溪涌小学) - Kuichong Subdistrict
- Nan'ao Central Primary School (南澳中心小学) - Nan'ao Subdistrict
