= Dapeng Subdistrict =

Subdistrict of Guangdong Province, China

Coordinates: 22.5998°N 114.4702°E

Location in China

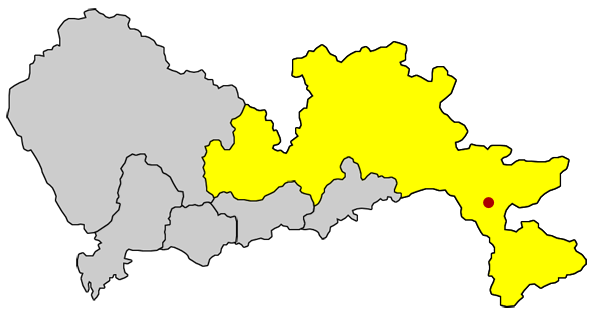
Location of Dapeng within the Longgang District within Shenzhen

Dapeng (Chinese: 大鹏街道; pinyin: Dàpéng jiēdào) is a subdistrict in the south east of Longgang District, in the prefecture-level city Shenzhen, in the Chinese province of Guangdong. In this area the main spoken dialects are Dapeng dialect and Bao'an Hakka.

== Geography ==
The north of Dapeng borders to subdistrict Kuichong and the south borders Nan'ao Subdistrict. The three together form the region Dapeng Peninsula. Dapeng borders two seas, the Dapeng Wan and the Daya Wan.

== Features ==
The Daya Bay Nuclear Power Station is located in at the east of the walled village Dapengcheng.

The biggest village is Wangmu; the headquarters of Dapeng is located there.

Villages:

- Dapengcheng 大鹏城
- Xinwu 新屋
- Xiadakang 下大坑
- Guanyinshan 观音山
- Xiasha 下沙
- Shuitou 水头
- Longqicun 龙岐村
- Wangmuxu 王母虚
- Ling'ao 岭澳

== Education ==
There is one secondary school ("middle school"), Dapeng Overseas Chinese Middle School (大鹏华侨中学). There is also one nine-year school (elementary and junior high school), Buxin School (布新学校).

Primary schools:

- Shenzhen Dapeng Central Primary School (深圳市大鹏新区大鹏中心小学)
- Shenzhen Dapeng No. 2 Primary School (深圳市大鹏新区大鹏第二小学)
