= Yonghu station =

Metro station in Shenzhen, China

Yonghu 永湖
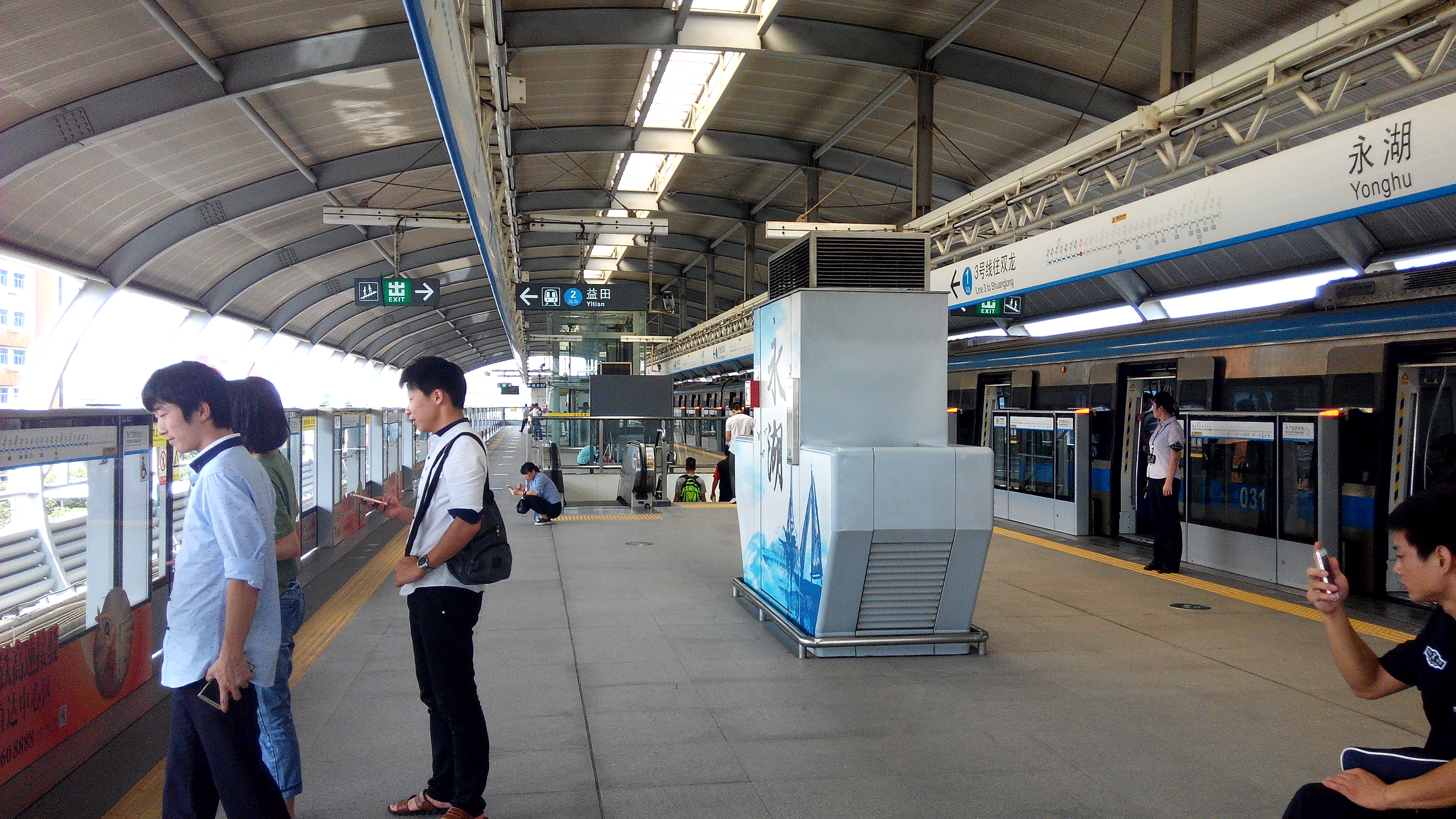
- Platform

General information
- Location: Longgang District, Shenzhen, Guangdong; China
- Coordinates: 22°39′28″N 114°13′3″E
- Operator: Shenzhen Metro Line 3 Operations
- Line: Line 3
- Platforms: 2 (1 island platform)
- Tracks: 2

Construction
- Structure type: Elevated
- Accessible: Yes

History
- Opened: 28 December 2010 (15 years ago)

Services
Preceding station	Shenzhen Metro	Following station
He'ao towards Pingdi Liulian	Line 3	Henggang towards Futian Bonded Area
Location

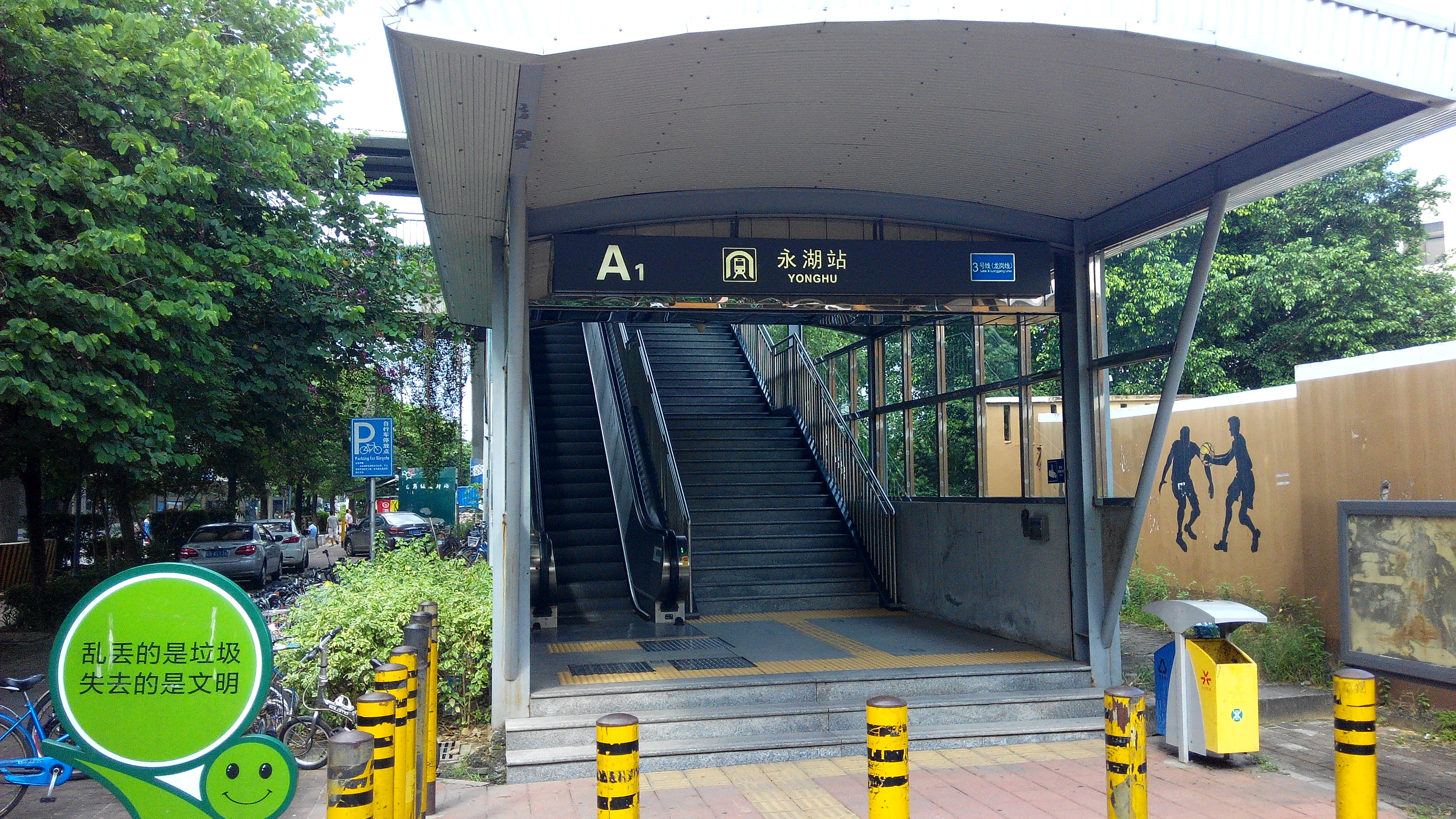
Exit A1

Yonghu station (Chinese: 永湖站; pinyin: Yǒnghú Zhàn) is a station on Line 3 of the Shenzhen Metro. It is located at the crossroads of Shenhui Road and Dakang Road, and opened on 28 December 2010.

== Station layout ==
3F; Platforms	Platform	3 towards Futian Bonded Area (Henggang)
3F; Platforms	Island platform, doors will open on the left
3F; Platforms	Platform	3 towards Pingdi Liulian (He'ao)
2F; Concourse	Lobby	Ticket Machines, Customer Service, Shops, Vending Machines
G	-	Exits A & C

== Exits ==
Exit		Destination
Exit A	A1	Shenhui Road (S), Longgang Boulevard (S), Jingli Road
Exit A	A2	Hengping Road
Exit C		Shenhui Road (N), Longgang Boulevard (N), Yucai Road
