= Universiade station =

Metro station in Shenzhen, China

Universiade 大运
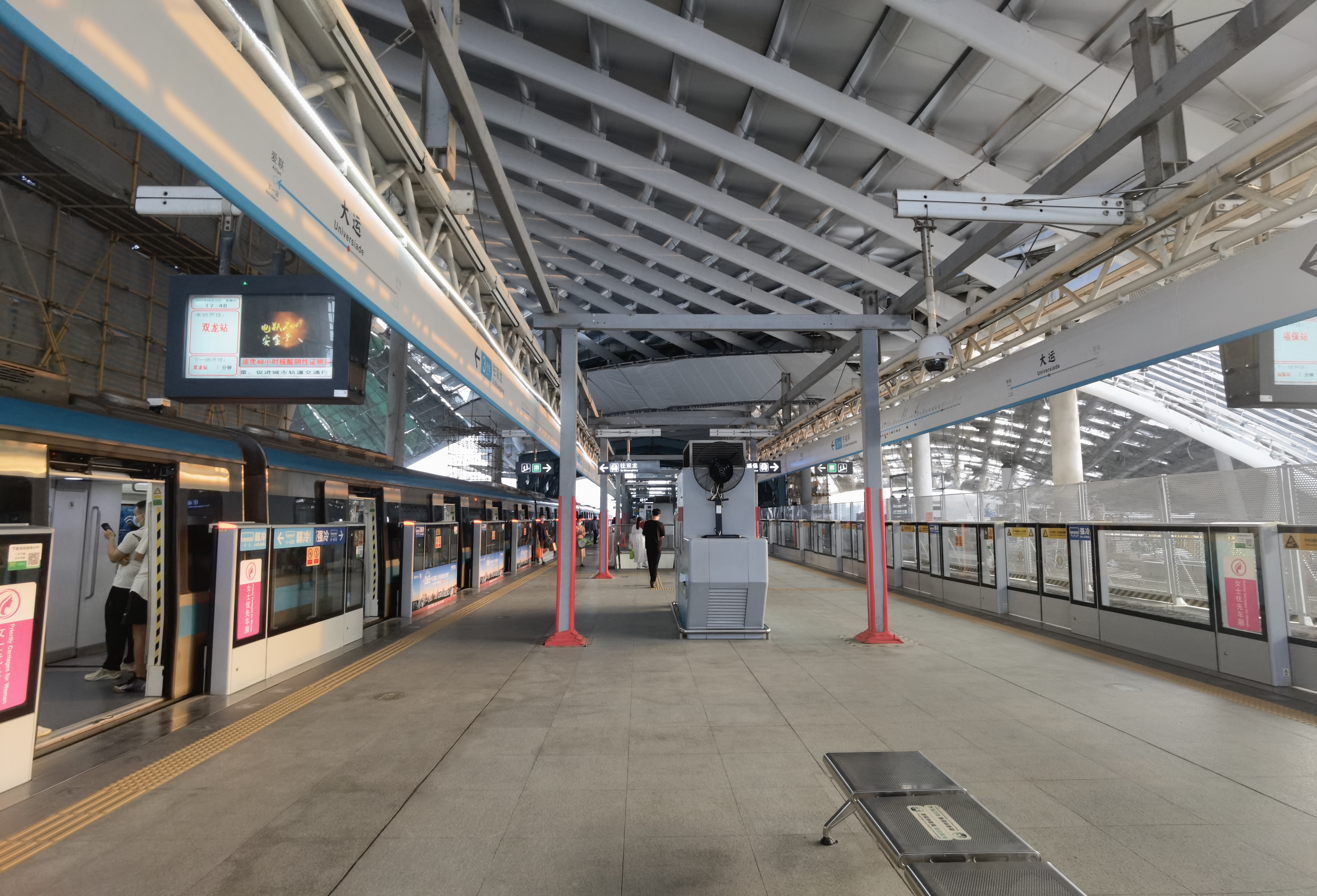
- Line 3 platforms (After revamp)

General information
- Location: Longgang District, Shenzhen, Guangdong; China
- Coordinates: 22°41′19″N 114°13′24″E
- Operator: SZMC (Shenzhen Metro Group)
- Lines: Line 3; Line 14; Line 16
- Platforms: 8 (3 island platforms and 2 side platforms)
- Tracks: 6

Construction
- Structure type: Elevated (Line 3); Underground (Lines 14 & 16)
- Accessible: Yes

History
- Opened: Line 3: 28 December 2010 (15 years ago); Line 14: 28 October 2022 (3 years ago); Line 16: 28 December 2022 (3 years ago)

Services
Preceding station	Shenzhen Metro	Following station
Ailian towards Pingdi Liulian	Line 3	He'ao towards Futian Bonded Area
Aobei towards Gangxia North	Line 14	Zhangbei towards Shatian
Jinyuan towards Yuanshan Xikeng	Line 16	Universiade Center towards Tianxin
Location

Universiade station is an interchange station for Line 3, Line 14 and Line 16 of the Shenzhen Metro between Jihe Highway (Chinese: 机荷高速) and Huangge South Road. Line 3 platforms opened on 28 December 2010, Line 14 platforms opened on 28 October 2022 and Line 16 platforms opened on 28 December 2022. It was the western terminus of Line 16 until the extension to Yuanshan Xikeng opened on 28 September 2025.

== Station layout ==
3F; 3 Platforms	Side platform, doors will open on the right
3F; 3 Platforms	↓ Platform ↑	3 towards Futian Bonded Area (He'ao)
3F; 3 Platforms	Island platform, doors will open on the left (Under Construction)
3F; 3 Platforms	↓ Platform ↑	3 towards Pingdi Liulian (Ailian)
3F; 3 Platforms	Side platform, doors will open on the right
2F; Concourse	Lobby of Line 3	Customer service, shops, vending machines, ATMs; Transfer passage between Line 3, Line 14 and Line 16
G	-	Exit
B1F; Concourse	Lobby of Line 14 and Line 16	Customer service, shops, vending machines, ATMs; Transfer passage between Line 3, Line 14 and Line 16
B2F; 14 & 16 Platforms	Platform	14 towards Gangxia North (Aobei)
B2F; 14 & 16 Platforms	Island platform, doors of will open on the left for 14 / right for 16
B2F; 14 & 16 Platforms	Platform	16 towards Yuanshan Xikeng (Jinyuan)
B2F; 14 & 16 Platforms	Platform	16 towards Tianxin (Universiade Center)
B2F; 14 & 16 Platforms	Island platform, doors will open on the right for 16 / right for 14
B2F; 14 & 16 Platforms	Platform	14 towards Shatian (Zhangbei)

== Exits ==
Exit	Destination
Exit 1, Exit 2	Universiade Software Town
Exit 3	South of Longfei Blvd, West Side of Longgang Blvd
Exit 4, Exit 5, Exit 6	West Side of Longgang Blvd, Guiping Intersection
Exit 7	West Side of Longgang Blvd
Exit 8, Exit 9, Exit 10	Universiade Software Town, East Side of Longgang Blvd
Exit 11	North Side of Longfei Blvd, West Side of Longgang Blvd
Exit 12	Hefeng Road
Exit 13	South Side of Longfei Blvd, West Side of Longgang Blvd
Exit 14	Universiade Comprehensive Transportation Hub

== Gallery ==
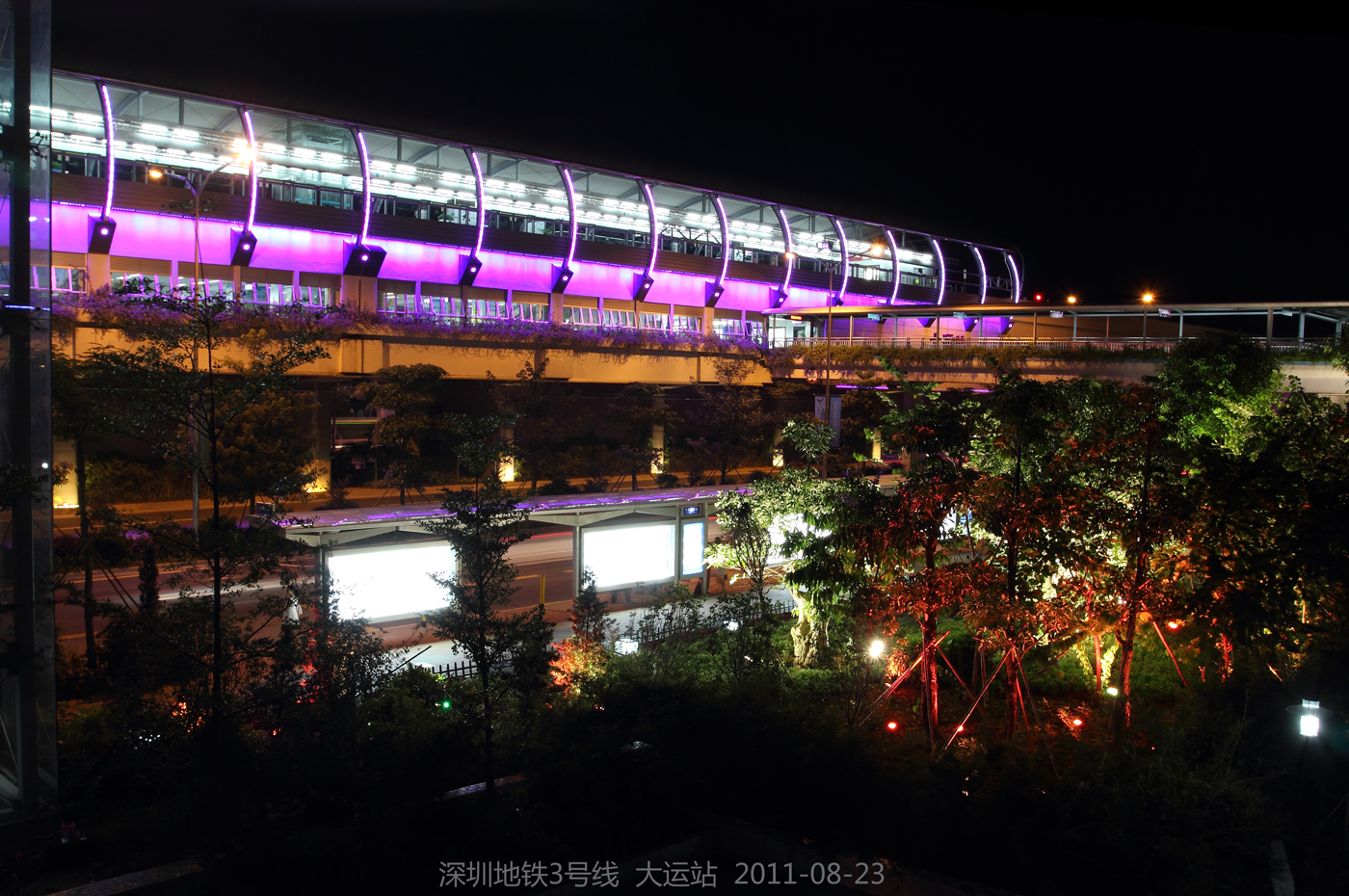
Outside the station (in 2011)

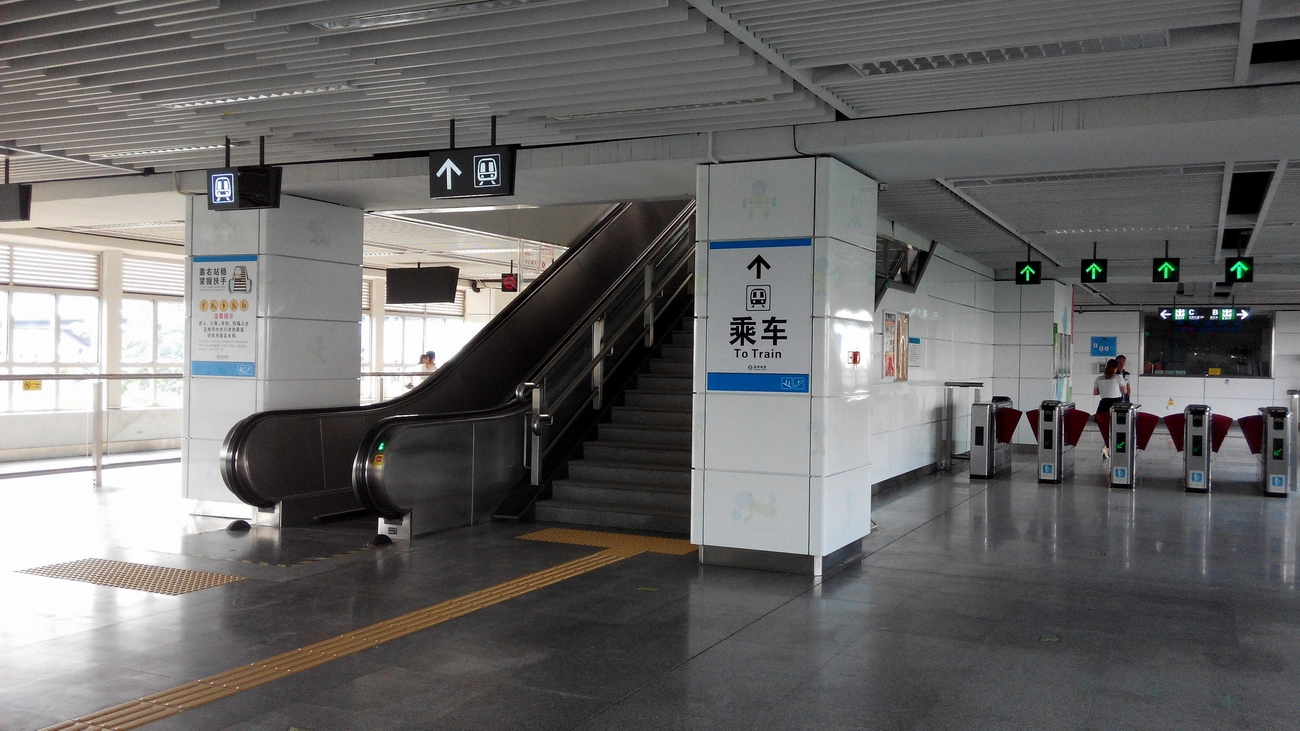
Line 3 original concourse

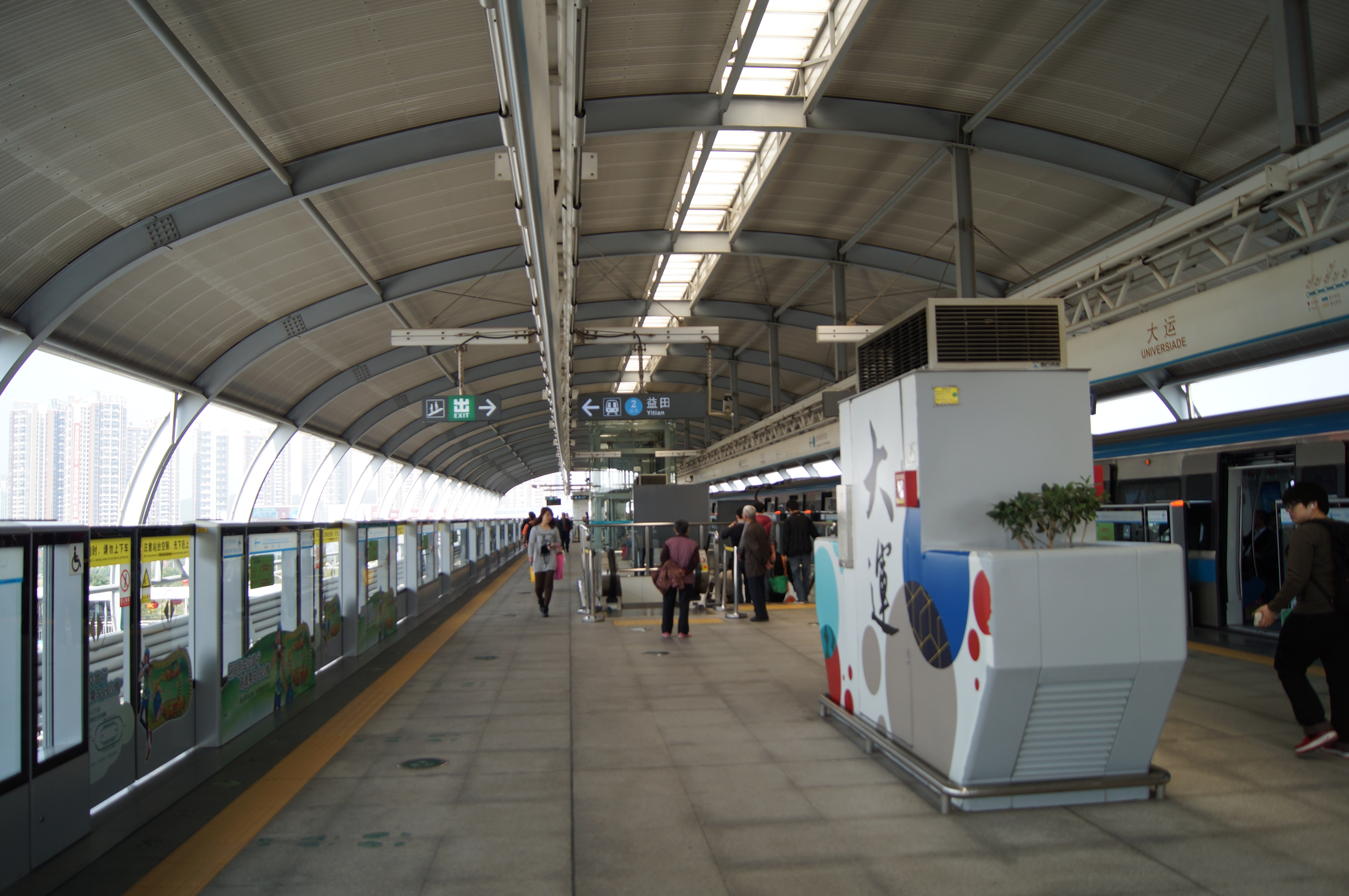
Line 3 original platform

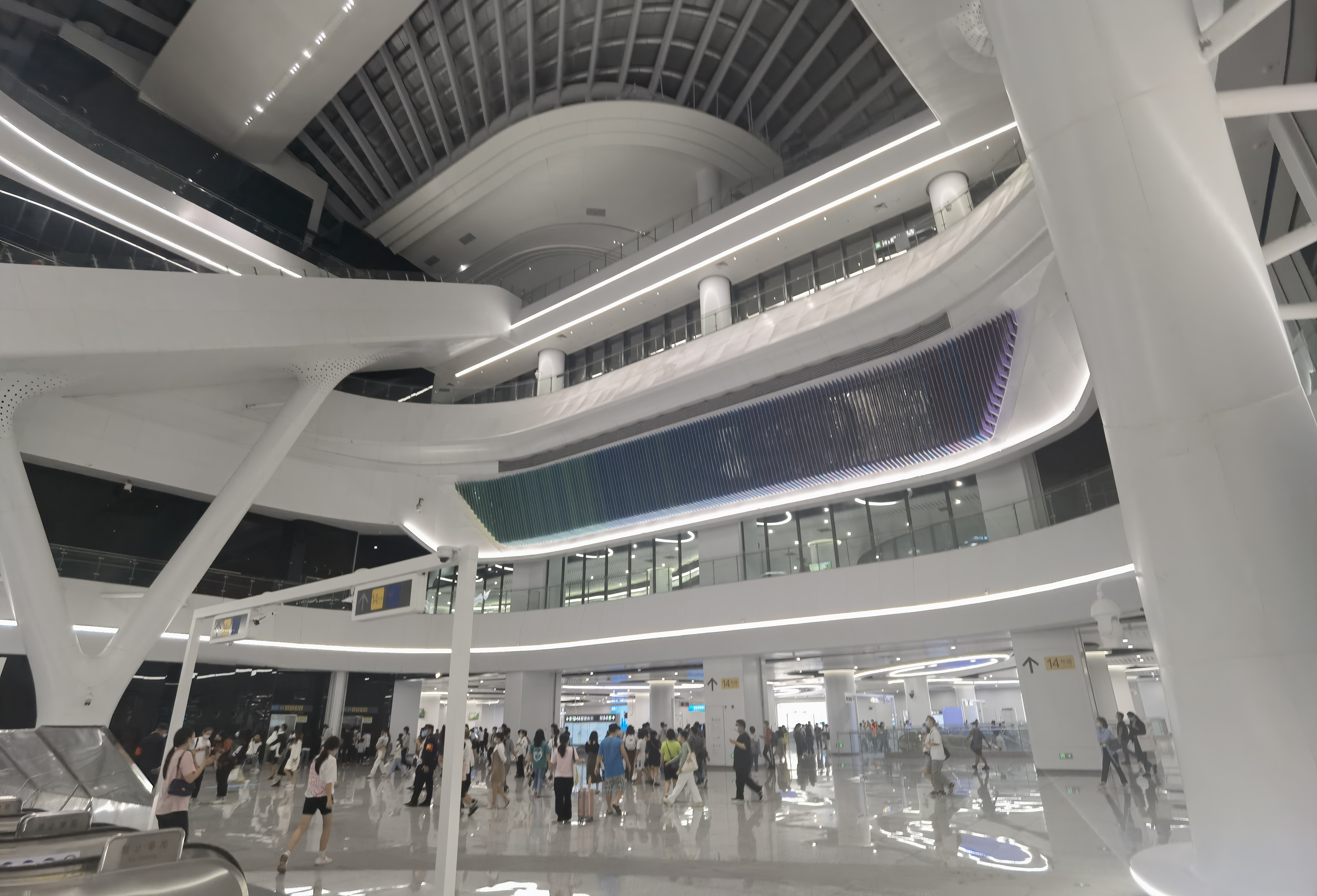
Transfer hall

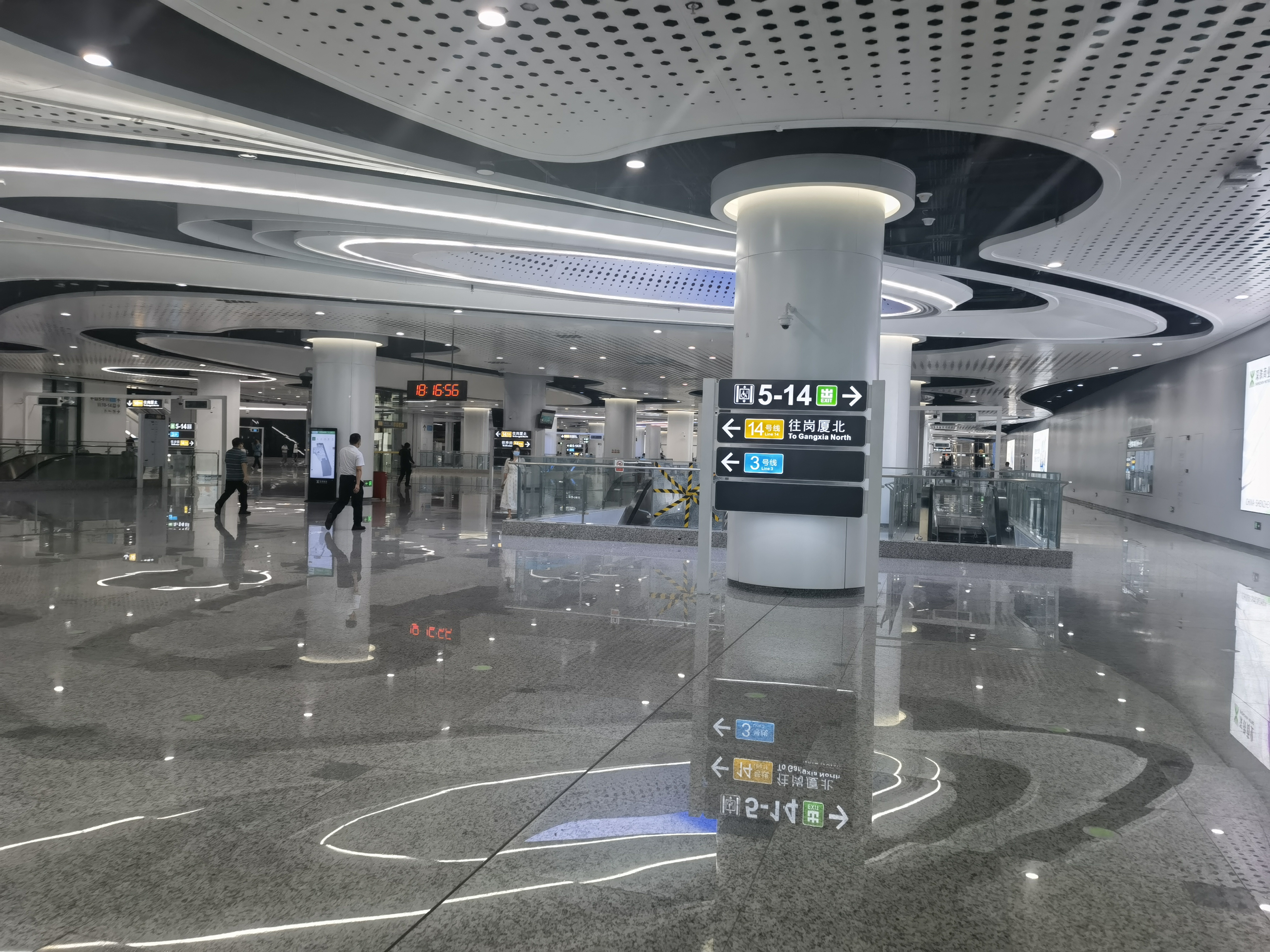
Line 14 and Line 16 concourse

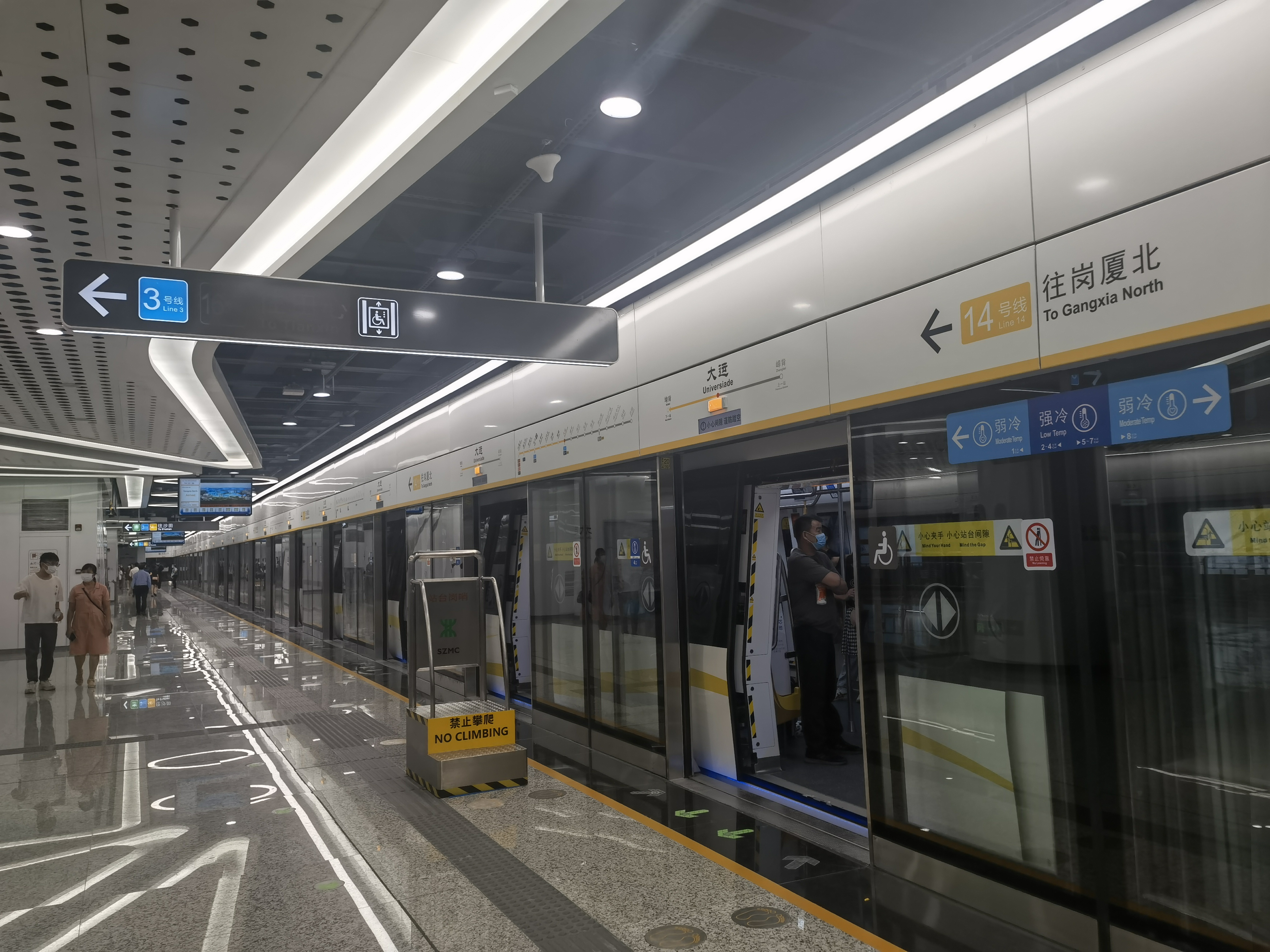
Line 14 platform (towards Gangxia North)

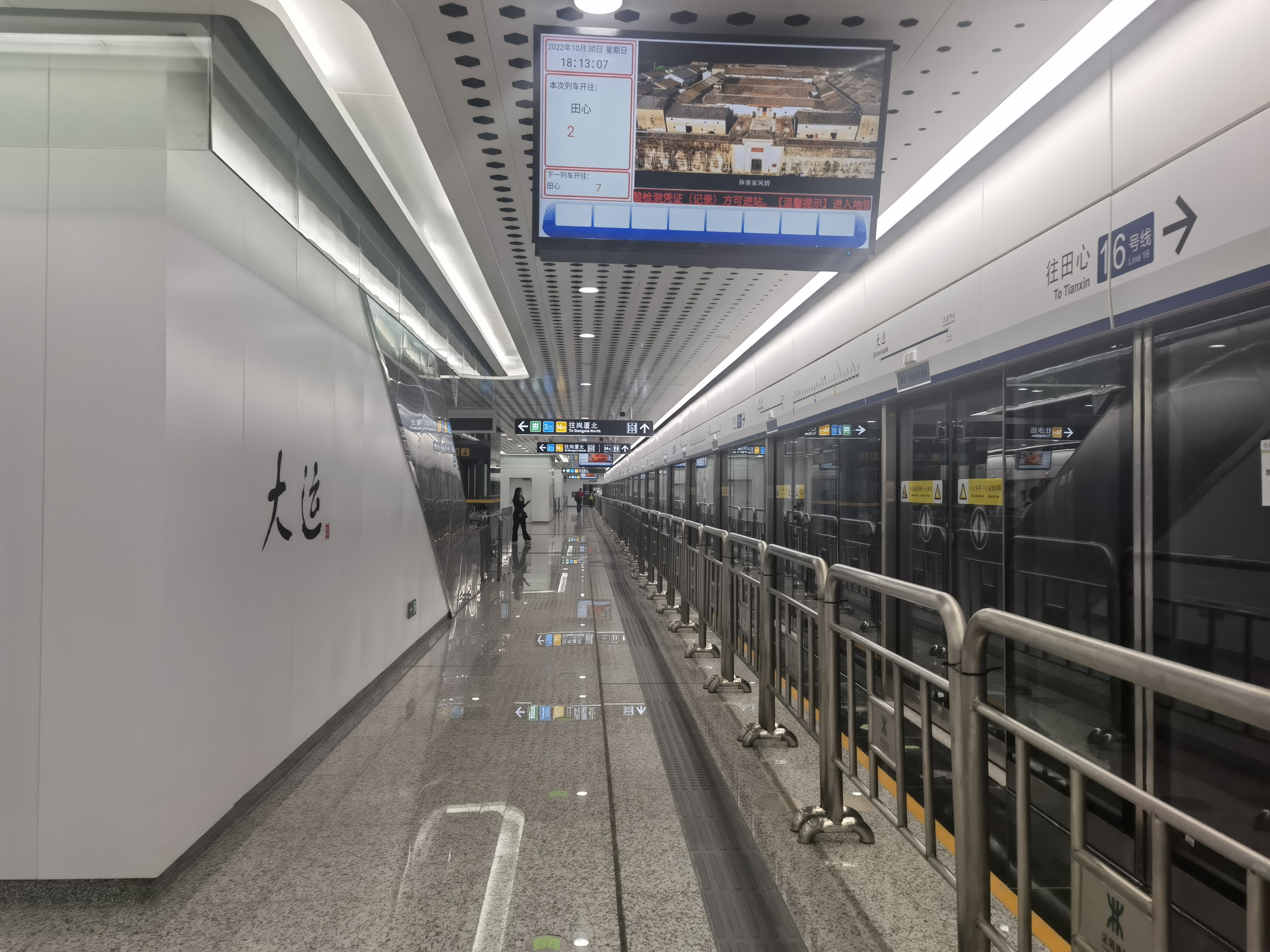
Line 16 platform (towards Tianxin)
