= Kuichong Subdistrict =

Coordinates: 22.6333°N 114.4190°E

Kuichong Subdistrict 葵涌街道
- Subdistrict

Chinese transcription(s)
- Interactive map of Kuichong Subdistrict
- Country: China
- Province: Guangdong
- Prefecture: Shenzhen
- District: Longgang
- District (not approved by state but approved at city level): Dapeng New Area
- Time zone: UTC+8 (China Standard Time)

Kuichong Subdistrict (Chinese: 葵涌街道) is a township-level division situated in Shenzhen, Guangdong, China.

== Education ==
Secondary schools ("middle schools"):

- Kuichong Middle School (葵涌中学)
- Shenzhen School (High School) Affiliated to Renmin University of China (人大附中深圳学校)

Nine-year schools (elementary and junior high schools):

- Shenzhen Yadi School (亚迪学校) in Kuichong Town
- Xingyu School (星宇学校) in Gaoyuan Community
- Shenzhen School Affiliated to Renmin University of China (人大附中深圳学校)

Primary schools:

- Kuichong Central Primary School (葵涌中心小学) - Kuichong
- Kuichong No. 2 Primary School (葵涌第二小学)
- Xichong Primary School (溪涌小学)

== See also ==
- Dapeng Peninsula
- Mirs Bay
- List of township-level divisions of Guangdong
