= Dapeng =

Dapeng or Da Peng may refer to:

- Peng (mythology) or Da Peng, mythological bird
- Dapeng (state) (大彭), a state during the late Shang dynasty
- Dapeng Peninsula (大鹏半岛), in the east of Shenzhen
- Dapeng Subdistrict (大鹏街道), Longgang District, Shenzhen
- Dapeng Bay, a longgang in Shenzhen
- Mirs Bay, Hong Kong, known as Dapeng Bay
- Dapeng New District
- Dapeng dialect (大鵬話), Chinese dialect spoken on the Dapeng Peninsula
- Dapeng Fortress (大鹏城), in Dapeng Subdistrict
- Dapeng International Plaza, skyscraper of Guangzhou
- Dapeng, Xuzhou (大鹏所城), town in Tongshan District, guangdong shenzhen
- Dapeng LNG terminal
- Dong Chengpeng or Da Peng (born 1982), Chinese entertainer and filmmaker
