= Junjiahua =

Chinese varieties

- 軍家話
- Native to: People's Republic of China; Taiwan
- Region: Taiwan: Taoyuan; Guangdong: Huizhou, Lufeng; Hainan: Sanya, Changjiang, Danzhou, Dongfang, Lingao; Guangxi; Fujian etc.
- Native speakers: (undated figure of ~150,000)
- Language family: Sino-Tibetan: Sinitic; Chinese; Mandarin; Junjiahua
- Writing system: Chinese characters

Language codes
- ISO 639-3: None (mis)
- ISO 639-6: jnha
- Glottolog: None

Junjiahua, Junhua, Junsheng, or "military speech" in English, is any of a number of isolated dialects in Guangdong, Guangxi, Hainan, Fujian, and Taiwan. Some believe that they are a Mandarin dialect group that assimilated to local Chinese variants in southern China. Junhua began as a lingua franca in the army, being spoken between soldiers dispatched to various parts of China during the Ming dynasty. It was subsequently spread to areas around the camps where the army settled. It is now an endangered language. In Hainan, it is still spoken by about 100,000 people. These speakers mainly live in Sanya (in Yacheng 崖城 and other locations), Changjiang Li Autonomous County, Danzhou, Dongfang, and Lingao.

Some also consider the Dapenghua spoken in Dapeng Peninsula of Shenzhen to be a form of Junjiahua.
