= Lai Enjue =

Chinese military general (1795–1848)

- 賴恩爵

Personal details
- Born: 1795 Dapeng Fortress, Kwangtung, Qing Dynasty
- Died: 1848 (aged 52–53) Qing Dynasty
- Awards: Baturu

Military service
- Allegiance: Qing Dynasty
- Commands: Deputy General of Dapeng Garrison (Stationed in Kowloon); Lieutenant General of Naam Ou Garrison (1841-1843); Admiral of Kwangtung Province (1843-1848)
- Battles/wars: First Opium War; Battle of Kowloon

Chinese name
- Traditional Chinese: 賴恩爵
- Simplified Chinese: 赖恩爵
Transcriptions
Standard Mandarin
- Hanyu Pinyin: Lài Ēnjué
- Wade–Giles: Lai^{4} Ên^{1}-tsüeh^{2}
- IPA: [ʈʂʰə̌n tɕjʊ̀ŋmǐŋ]
Hakka
- Pha̍k-fa-sṳ: Lai Ên-chiok
Yue: Cantonese
- Jyutping: Laai^{6} Jan^{1}-zoek^{3}
- IPA: [laj˨ jɐn˥tsœk̚˧]

Courtesy name
- Traditional Chinese: 簡廷
- Simplified Chinese: 简廷
Transcriptions
Standard Mandarin
- Hanyu Pinyin: Jiǎn Tíng
- Wade–Giles: Chien^{3} T'ing^{2}
Hakka
- Pha̍k-fa-sṳ: Kián Thìn
Yue: Cantonese
- Jyutping: Gaan^{2} Ting^{4}
- IPA: [kan˧˥ tʰɪŋ˩]

Lai Enjue (Chinese: 賴恩爵, 1795–1848), also known as Jian Ting (簡廷) was a late Qing military general. He was from Dapeng Fortress, Xin'an County, Guangdong (within modern-day Dapeng New District, Shenzhen), and has ancestry from Zijin County, Guangdong. Lai fought the British in the Battle of Kowloon during the First Opium War in 1839 and was given the title of Baturu and an equivalent rank of Lieutenant General. On 25 December 1843, he was appointed as the Admiral (水師提督) of the Guangdong Navy. He served in this post until 1848 when he died of illness.

Just before Lai died, he told his family clan that his wish was to see the return of Hong Kong to China. Ten days before the handover of Hong Kong on 1 July 1997, more than a hundred of the Lai clan descendants from different parts of the world returned to their ancestral home to mark the event.

Lai worked directly under the orders of Emperor Daoguang and Lin Zexu, both prominent figures in the First Opium War. The current Kowloon Walled City's "Dapeng Association House" forms the remnants of what was previously Lai's garrison. His tomb is under the maintenance of the Shenzhen Cultural Protection Division.
