= Xichong =

Xichong may refer to:

- Xichong, Shenzhen, scenic spot in Longgang District, Shenzhen, China
- Xichong County, county in Nanchong, Sichuan, China
