= Sanmen Island =

Island in Daya Bay

Coordinates: 22°27′45″N 114°37′55″E

Sanmen Island (Chinese: 三门岛) is an island in Daya Bay. Administratively it belongs to Huizhou. It lies 1.5 and 8.7 nautical miles to Dapeng Peninsula, Shenzhen and Sai Kung, Hong Kong respectively. Its highest point is 298 meters above sea level. It is 5 km^{2} in size and has a coastline of 13 kilometers.
