= Nan'ao Subdistrict =

Coordinates: 22.5370°N 114.4864°E

Nan'ao Subdistrict 南澳街道
- Subdistrict
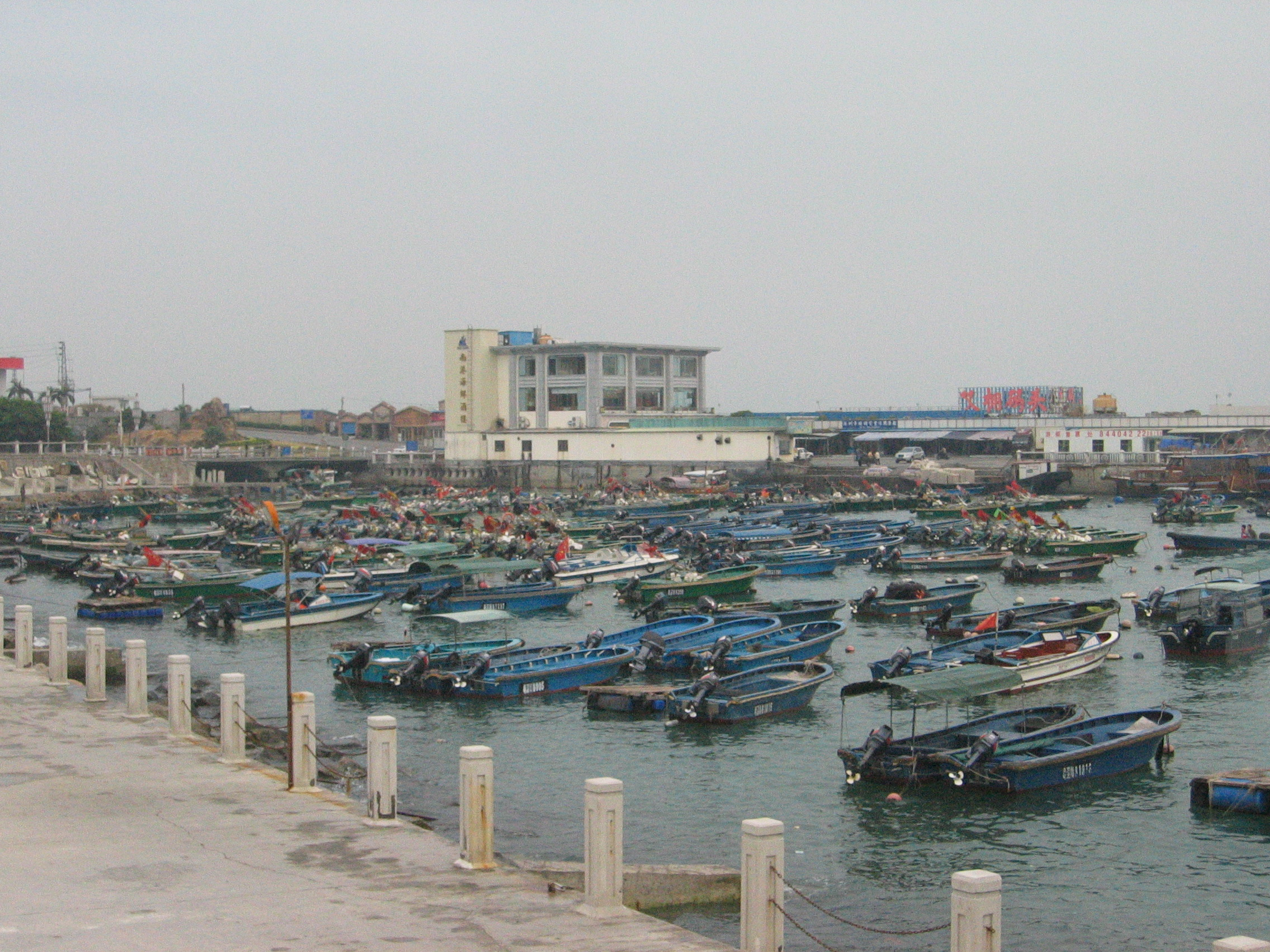
- Nan'ao
- Interactive map of Nan'ao Subdistrict
- Country: China
- Province: Guangdong
- Prefecture: Shenzhen
- District: Longgang

Nan'ao Subdistrict (Chinese: 南澳街道) is a township-level division situated in Shenzhen, Guangdong, China. It is located on Dapeng Peninsula, on the shores of Mirs Bay.

== Education ==
There is one secondary school ("middle school"), Nan'ao Middle School (南澳中学), and one primary school, Nan'ao Central Primary School (南澳中心小学).

== See also ==
- Qiniangshan
- Xichong, Shenzhen
- Ping Chau, an island of Hong Kong close to Nan'ao
- List of township-level divisions of Guangdong
