= Peng (mythology) =

Bird from Chinese mythology

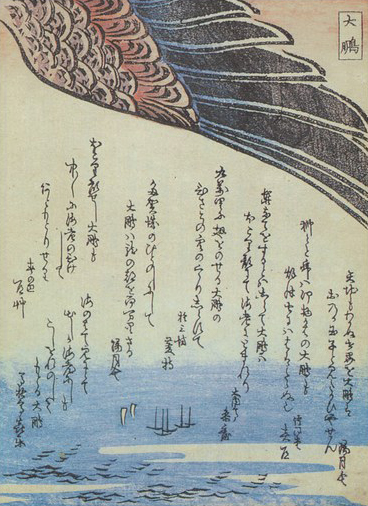
- Wing of the Peng from the Japanese Kyoka Hyaku Monogatari

Creature information
- Other name(s): Dapeng, Kun
- Similar entities: Ziz (Jewish mythology), Roc (Persian/Arabian mythology)
- Folklore: Chinese mythology

Origin
- First attested: Zhuangzi (Chuang Tzŭ)
- Country: China
- Details: Fish-turned-giant monster bird

Kun
- Traditional Chinese: 鯤
- Simplified Chinese: 鲲
- Literal meaning: "fish roe"
Transcriptions
Standard Mandarin
- Hanyu Pinyin: kūn
- Bopomofo: ㄎㄨㄣ
- Wade–Giles: k'un^{1}
- IPA: [kʰwə́n]
Yue: Cantonese
- Yale Romanization: kwān
Southern Min
- Hokkien POJ: khun

Peng
- Traditional Chinese: 鵬
- Simplified Chinese: 鹏
Transcriptions
Standard Mandarin
- Hanyu Pinyin: péng
- Bopomofo: ㄆㄥˊ
- Wade–Giles: ta^{4}-p'eng^{2}
- IPA: [pʰə̌ŋ]
Yue: Cantonese
- Yale Romanization: pàahng
Southern Min
- Hokkien POJ: phêng

Dapeng
- Traditional Chinese: 大鵬
- Simplified Chinese: 大鹏
- Literal meaning: "great Peng"
Transcriptions
Standard Mandarin
- Hanyu Pinyin: dàpéng
- Bopomofo: ㄉㄚˋ ㄆㄥˊ
- Wade–Giles: p'eng^{2}
- IPA: [tâpʰə̌ŋ]
Yue: Cantonese
- Yale Romanization: daaih pàahng
Southern Min
- Hokkien POJ: tāi-phêng

A Peng (Chinese: 鵬; pinyin: péng) or Dapeng (大鵬; dàpéng) is a giant bird that transforms from a Kun (鯤; kūn), a giant fish, in Chinese mythology.

== Names ==
The Chinese logograms for peng and kun exemplify common radical-phonetic characters. Peng (鵬) combines the "bird radical" (鳥) with a peng (朋; 'friend') phonetic, and kun (鲲; 鯤) combines the "fish radical" (魚) with a kun (昆; 'progeny', 'insect') phonetic.

Peng (鵬) was anciently a variant Chinese character for feng (鳳) (as in fenghuang (鳳凰; "Chinese phoenix")), according to the c. 100 CE Shuowen Jiezi. Kun (鯤) originally meant "fish roe; fry; spawn" (c. 200 BCE Erya).

Synonyms of Peng include Dapeng (大鵬; "Big Peng", "Great Peng") and Dapengniao (大鵬鳥; "Great Peng Bird"). Dapeng is also a place name for a few places in greater China, most notably in Shenzhen and Taiwan.

After recent fossil discoveries in northeast China, Chinese paleontologists used Peng to name the enantiornithine bird Pengornis and the wukongopterid pterosaur Kunpengopterus.

== Etymology ==
Linguist Wang Li relates 鵬, OC:*‍bɯːŋ (ZS) "peng, fabulous great bird" to element 鳳, OC:*‍bums (ZS), mod. fèng in 鳳凰, OC:*‍bums ɡʷaːŋ, mod. fènghuáng; 鳳 is also related to *plum, OC:*‍風, mod. fēng "wind".

== Literature ==
=== Zhuangzi ===
In Chinese literature, the Daoist classic Zhuangzi has the oldest record of the Kun Peng myth. The first chapter (逍遙遊; xiāoyáoyóu; "Free and Easy Wandering") begins with three versions of this parable; the lead paragraph, a quote from the Qixie (齊諧; "Universal Harmony", probably invented by Zhuangzi), and a quote from the Tang zhi wen Ji (湯之問棘; "Questions of Tang to Ji", cf. Liezi chapter 5, 湯問; Tang wen). The first account contrasts the giant Peng bird with a small tiao (蜩; "cicada") and jiu (鳩; "pigeon; turtledove") and the third with a yan (鴳 or 鷃; "quail"). The Peng fish-bird transformation is not only the beginning myth in Zhuangzi, but Robert Allinson claims, "the central myth".

In the northern darkness there is a fish and his name is K'un. The K'un is so huge I don't know how many thousand li he measures. He changes and becomes a bird whose name is P'eng. The back of the P'eng measures I don't know how many thousand li across and, when he rises up and flies off, his wings are like clouds all over the sky. When the sea begins to move, this bird sets off for the southern darkness, which is the Lake of Heaven.

The Universal Harmony records various wonders, and it says: "When the P'eng journeys to the southern darkness, the waters are roiled for three thousand li. He beats the whirlwind and rises ninety thousand li, setting off on the sixth month gale." Wavering heat, bits of dust, living things blowing each other about – the sky looks very blue. Is that its real color, or is it because it is so far away and has no end? When the bird looks down, all he sees is blue too.

If water is not piled up deep enough, it won't have the strength to bear up a big boat. Pour a cup of water into a hollow in the floor and bits of trash will sail on it like boats. But set the cup there and it will stick fast, for the water is too shallow and the boat too large. If wind is not piled up deep enough, it won't have the strength to bear up great wings. Therefore when the P'eng rises ninety thousand li, he must have the wind under him like that. Only then can he mount on the back of the wind, shoulder the blue sky, and nothing can hinder or block him. Only then can he set his eyes to the south.

The cicada and the little dove laugh at this saying, "When we make an effort and fly up, we can get as far as the elm or the sapanwood tree, but sometimes we don't make it and just fall down on the ground. Now how is anyone going to go ninety thousand li to the south!"

If you go off to the green woods nearby, you can take along food for three meals and come back with your stomach as full as ever. If you are going a hundred li, you must grind your grain the night before; and if you are going a thousand li you must start getting together provisions three months in advance. What do these two creatures understand? Little understanding cannot come up to great understanding; the short-lived cannot come up to the long-lived. ...

Among the questions of T'ang to Ch'i we find the same thing. In the bald and barren north, there is a dark sea, the Lake of Heaven. In it is a fish which is several thousand li across, and no one knows how long. His name is K'un. There is also a bird there, named P'eng, with a back like Mount T'ai and wings like clouds filling the sky. He beats the whirlwind, leaps into the air, and rises up ninety thousand li, cutting through the clouds and mist, shouldering the blue sky, and then he turns his eyes south and prepares to journey to the southern darkness.

The little quail laughs at him, saying, "Where does he think he's going? I give a great leap and fly up, but I never get more than ten or twelve yards before I come down fluttering among the weeds and brambles. And that's the best kind of flying anyway! Where does he think he's going?" Such is the difference between big and little.

=== Analysis and interpretations ===
Many Zhuangzi scholars have debated the Peng story. Lian Xinda calls it "arguably the most controversial image in the text, which has been inviting conflicting interpretations for the past seventeen centuries."

In traditional Chinese scholarship, the standard Peng interpretation was the "equality theory" of Guo Xiang (d. 312 CE), who redacted and annotated the received Zhuangzi text. Guo's commentary said,

The flight of the fabulous (P'eng) bird may take half a year and will not stop until it gets to the Celestial Lake. The flight of a small bird takes only half of the morning and stops at getting from tree to tree. So far as capacities are concerned, there is a difference. But in adapting to their nature, they are the same.

Some Chinese scholars gave alternate interpretations. The Buddhist monk Zhi Dun (314-366 CE) associated the Peng's flight with the highest satisfaction achieved by the zhiren (至人; 'perfect person', 'sage', 'saint', 'cf. zhenren').

Now, that which wanders free and easy is clearly the mind of the Perfected Man. Master Chuang spoke of the great Tao and expressed his meaning with the P'eng bird and the quail. Because the P'eng bird's path through life is far reaching, it neglects [spiritual] satisfaction beyond the body. Because the quail is nearby, it laughs at what is distant and is pleased with itself in its heart. The Perfected Man [however] ascends heaven directly and joyfully wanders endlessly in freedom.

The Chan Buddhist master Hanshan Deqing (憨山德清, 1546–1623) also declares the Peng is the image of the Daoist sage, and suggests the bird's flight does not result from the piling up of wind but from the deep piling up of de "virtue; power".

In modern scholarship, some scholars reject Guo's "equality theory" construal. Lian differentiates contemporary interpretations between whether Zhuangzi was a radical skeptic and/or a relativist.

The Peng bird can either be construed as an image of freedom, even the epitome of the highest Daoist ideal, which supports the argument that Zhuangzi does privilege a perspective and hence is not a relativist in the rigid sense of the term; or it is taken for a creature that is no better or worse than the cicada and the little birds, which serves to illustrate the relativist view that all perspectives are equal."

Julian Pas concurs that "the true sage is compared to the enormous bird." Angus Charles Graham sees the Peng as "soaring above the restricted viewpoints of the worldly." Allinson finds it "very clear and very explicit that the standpoint of the big bird and the standpoint of the cicada and the dove are not seen as possessing equal value." Karen Carr and Philip J. Ivanhoe find "positive ideals" in the Peng symbolizing the "mythical creature that rises above the more mundane concerns of the word. Brian Lundberg says Zhuangzi uses the image to urge us to "go beyond restricted small points of views." Eric Schwitzgebel interprets, "Being small creatures, we cannot understand great things like the Peng (and the rest of the Zhuangzi?)." Steve Coutinho describes the Peng as a "recluse who wanders beyond the realm of the recognizable", in contrast the tiny birds that "cannot begin to understand what lies so utterly beyond the confines of their mundane experience." Scott Cook writes, "We are, at first, led by Zhuangzi almost imperceptibly into an unreflective infatuation with the bird." Lian concludes the Peng is "An inspiring example of soaring up and going beyond, the image is used to broaden the outlook of the small mind; its function is thus more therapeutic than instructional." Bryan W. Van Norden suggests, "The likely effect of this passage on the reader is a combination of awe and disorientation."

Zhuangzi's Peng bird became a famous literary metaphor. Two early examples were the Shen yi jing (神異經; "Classic of Divine Marvels") by Dongfang Shuo (154 BCE – 93 CE) and the Commentary on the Water Classic (水經注).

=== Comparisons ===
In comparative mythology of giant creatures, Peng is similar to the Roc or Garuda and Kun to the Leviathan.

=== In poetry ===
Mao Zedong invoked the name of Peng in his poem "Tingzhou to Changsha" (Chinese: 從汀州向長沙) in July 1930, to the tune of Butterflies Courting Flowers (Chinese) by Ouyang Xiu of the Tang dynasty.

《蝶戀花·從汀州向長沙·毛澤東》
六月天兵征腐惡，
萬丈長纓要把鯤鵬縛。
贛水那邊紅一角，
偏師借重黃公略。

百萬工農齊踴躍，
席捲江西直搗湘和鄂。
國際悲歌歌一曲，
狂飆為我從天落。

In June our soldiers of heaven fight against evil and rot.

They have a huge rope to tie up the Kun and Peng.

On the far side of the Gan waters the ground turns red under the strategy of Huang Gonglüe.

A million workers and peasants leap up joyfully and roll up Jiangsi like a mat.

As we reach the rivers of Hunan and Hebei, we sing the Internationale. It pierces us like a whirlwind from the sky.

The poem was written as the Red Army was about to attack Nanchang, but the attack would go on to fail. Huang Gonglüe was in charge of the right flank of the operation and would be killed in action in 1931.

== Notable people named Peng ==
Peng linguistically symbolizes "greatness; great promise; great accomplishments"; for instance, the idiom péng chéng wàn lǐ (鵬程萬里; "the Peng journeys 10,000 li") means "have a bright/unlimited future". This character is commonly used in Chinese given names and several important mainland Chinese, Hong Kong and Taiwanese politicians have Peng in their given names. In contrast, the character Kun (鯤/鲲) is seldom used.

Mainland China:

- Yue Fei (courtesy name: Pengju, 鵬舉), Chinese military general, calligrapher, and poet during the Southern Song dynasty
- Li Peng (李鵬), former Premier of China
- Yuan Peng (袁鹏), Chinese academic and vice minister of state security whose pseudonym is Yuan Yikun (袁亦鲲)
- Ji Pengfei (姬鵬飛), Chinese politician
- Xiao Peng (肖鵬)
- Bi Dapeng (毕大鹏)
- Peng Kiong Chou
- Lin Peng (林鹏), Chinese actress
- Dong Chengpeng (董成鹏), professionally known as Da Peng (大鹏), Chinese actor, film director and singer
- Yue Yunpeng (岳云鹏), Chinese actor and xiangsheng performer
- Jing Haipeng (景海鹏), Chinese astronaut
- Ouyang Kunpeng (欧阳鲲鹏), Chinese swimmer (note Kun is also used in this case)

Hong Kong:

- Stanley Kwan Kam-pang (關錦鵬), Hong Kong film director and producer
- Ruco Chan Chin-pang (陳展鵬), Hong Kong actor and singer
- Lo Hoi-pang (盧海鵬), Hong Kong actor and singer
- Lam Tung Pang (林東鵬), Hong Kong artist

Taiwan:

- Yeh Yao-peng (葉耀鵬), Taiwanese politician
- Cheng Yun-peng (鄭運鵬), Taiwanese politician
- Hsieh Cheng-peng (謝政鵬), Taiwanese tennis player

Southeast Asia:

- Alex Au Waipang (区伟鹏), Singaporean LGBT rights activist
- Goh Choon Phong (吴俊鹏), Singaporean businessman and CEO of Singapore Airlines
- Prajogo Pangestu (彭雲鵬), Indonesian business magnate of Chinese descent

Japan:

The Chinese character peng is pronounced hō in Japanese, as seen in the sumo ring names Taihō Kōki (大鵬幸喜), Hakuhō Shō (白鵬翔), Enhō Akira (炎鵬晃), Daishōhō Kiyohiro (大翔鵬 清洋), Tokushinhō Motohisa (德真鵬 元久), Wakanohō Toshinori (若ノ鵬 寿則), Kyokutenhō Masaru (旭天鵬 勝) and so on. It is also used in company names, such as Taiho Pharmaceutical (大鵬薬品工業).

== See also ==
- Golden Winged Great Peng
- Birds in Chinese mythology
- Fenghuang
- Roc
- Thunderbird
- Fish in Chinese mythology
