= Hakka walled village =

Settlement style historically popular among Hakka Chinese

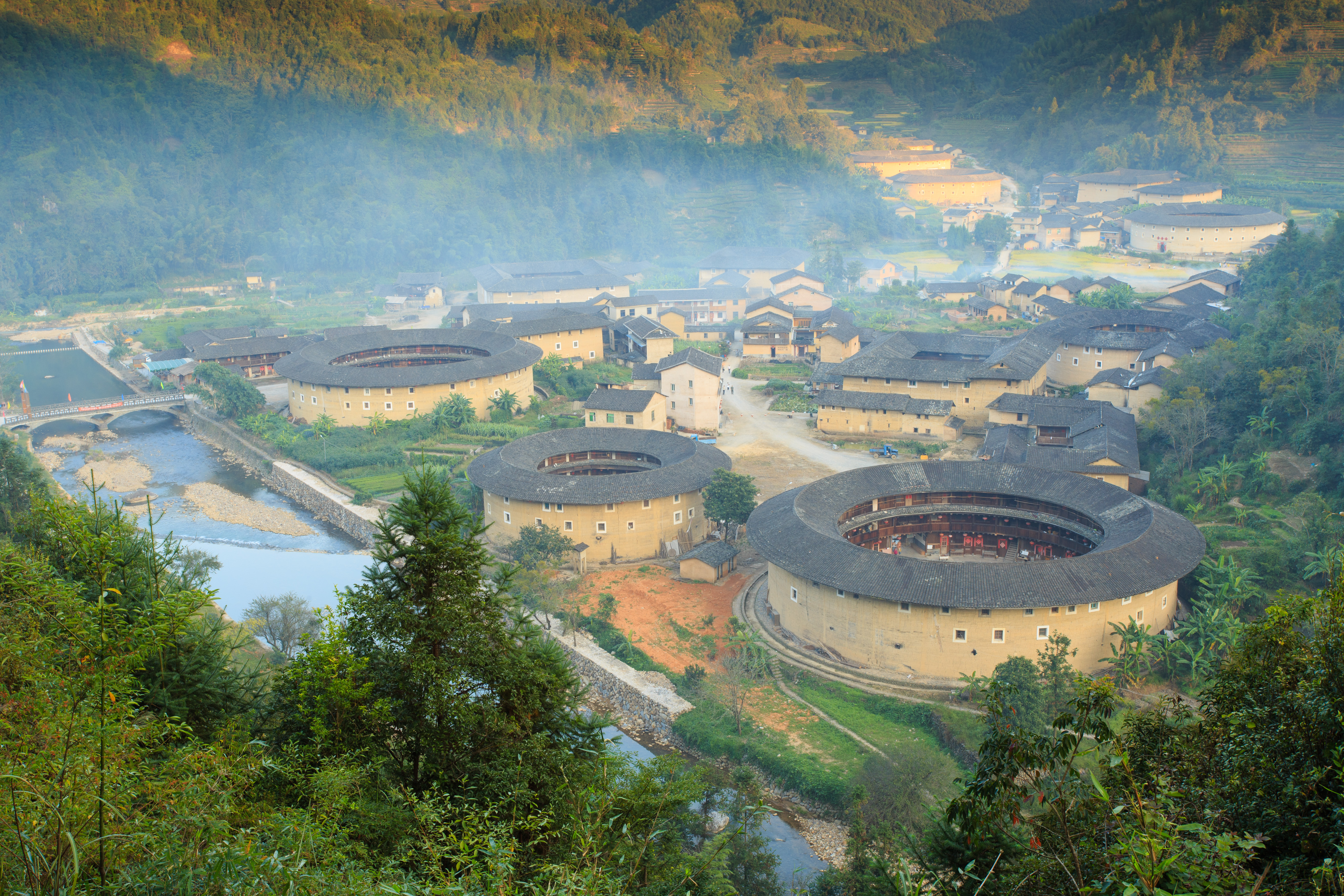
- Hekeng walled village in Fujian, China

Chinese name
- Traditional Chinese: 圍龍屋
- Simplified Chinese: 围龙屋
- Pha̍k-fa-sṳ: vì-liùng-vuk
Transcriptions
Standard Mandarin
- Hanyu Pinyin: Wéilóngwū
Hakka
- Pha̍k-fa-sṳ: vì-liùng-vuk
Yue: Cantonese
- Jyutping: wai^{4} lung^{4} uk^{1}

A Hakka walled village (simplified Chinese: 围龙屋; traditional Chinese: 圍龍屋) is a large multi-family communal living structure that is designed to be easily defensible. This building style is unique to the Hakka people found in southern China. Walled villages are typically designed for defensive purposes and consist of one entrance and no windows at the ground level.

== History ==
The Hakka were originally immigrants from northern China who settled in the southern provinces. From the 17th century onwards, population pressures drove them more and more into conflict with their neighbours (called punti in Cantonese). As rivalry for resources turned to armed warfare, the Hakka began building communal living structures designed to be easily defensible. These houses, sometimes called tulou 土楼, were often round in shape and internally divided into many compartments for food storage, living quarters, ancestral temple, armoury etc. The largest houses covered over 40,000 m^{2} (430,000 sq ft) and it is not unusual to find surviving houses of over 10,000 m^{2} (110,000 sq ft).

== Features ==
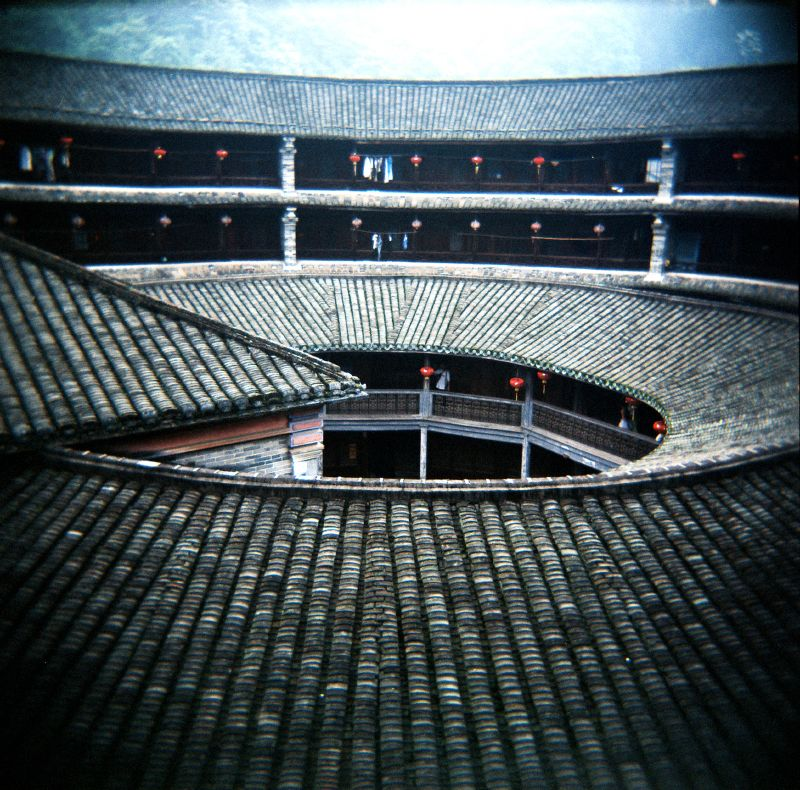
An interior view

Hakka walled villages can be constructed from brick, stone, or rammed earth, with the last being the most common. The external wall is typically 1 metre (3 ft) in thickness and the entire building could be up to three or four stories in height. Often turrets were also built to extend the range of defensive power and to cover otherwise indefensible points. Battlements were also constructed on the top floor for muskets. The gate was the most vulnerable point and it was usually reinforced with stone and covered with iron. A number of smaller gates followed, in case the outer one was breached. With the exception of a few exceptionally large forts, Hakka houses usually only had one entrance. The round shape of the walls, which became popular in later stages, added to the defensive value of the fortifications and reduced the firepower of artillery against it. A Hakka fort could withstand a protracted siege, since it was well stocked with grains and had an internal source of water. They often also had their own sophisticated sewage systems.

The architectural style of Hakka forts is unique in China and around the world. The typical Chinese house contains a courtyard and, other than pagodas, does not often contain any structures higher than two stories.

Researchers note similarity between some of the walled villages and some ancient fortifications in southern China, as seen in Han dynasty and Three Kingdoms tomb models unearthed in Guangzhou, Guangdong and in Ezhou, Hubei.

== Tulou ==
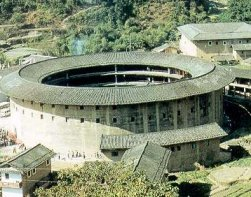
Tulou in Yongding, Fujian

The Hakkas who settled in mountainous south western Fujian province in China developed unique architectural buildings called tulou, literally meaning earthen structures. The Hakkas set up these unique homes to prevent attack from bandits and marauders. The tulou are either round or square, and were designed as a large fortress and apartment building in one. Structures typically had only one entranceway and no windows at ground level. Each floor served a different function - the first hosts a well and livestock, the second is for food storage and the third and higher floors contain living spaces. Tulou can be found mostly in south western Fujian and southern Jiangxi provinces. Tulou buildings have been inscribed in 2008 by UNESCO as a World Heritage Site.

== Guangdong ==
The largest communities of Hakkas live mostly in eastern Guangdong, particularly in Xing-Mei (Xingning-Meixian), whereas most of the other Hakkas come from Huizhou. Unlike their kin in Fujian, the Hakkas in Xingning (兴宁, Hin Nin) and Meixian (梅县, Moi Yen) developed non-fortress-like architectural styles, typified most notably by the weilongwu (Chinese: 围龙屋; pinyin: wéi-lóng-wū) and sijiaolou (Chinese: 四角楼; pinyin: sì-jǐao-lóu).

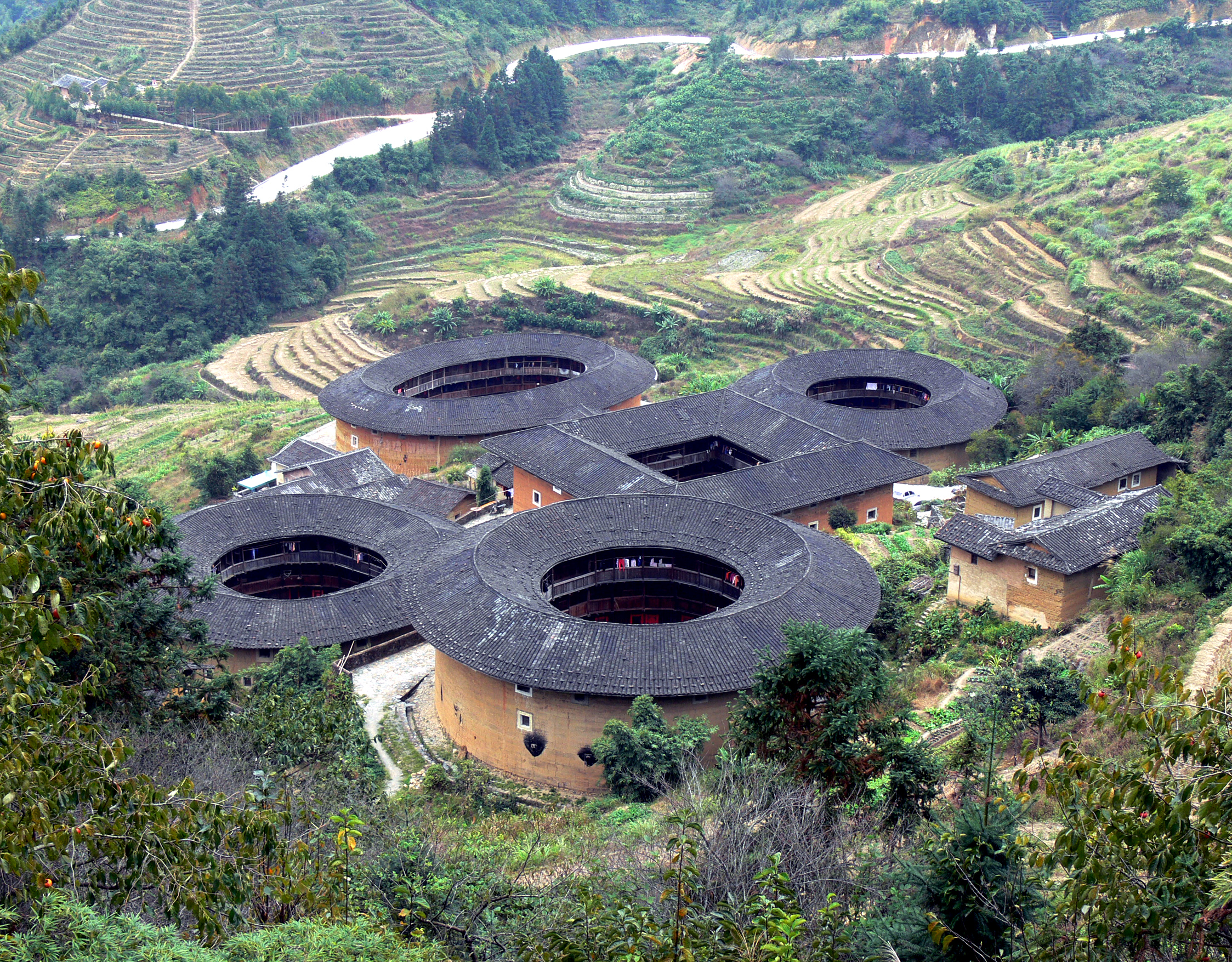
A hakka complex of houses

== Jiangxi ==
There are about 500 Hakka walled villages in the southern part of Jiangxi province; some 370 of them are in Longnan County. They are known locally as weiwu (围屋) or wei (围).

== See also ==
- Cantonese architecture
- Chinese architecture
- Lai Chi Wo, the largest and most well-preserved Hakka walled village in Hong Kong
- Walled villages of Hong Kong
