= Dapeng dialect =

Yue dialect of Guangdong, China

Dapeng
- 大鵬話 / 大鹏话
- Pronunciation: [tʰai̯˥˦ pʰuŋ˧˩ wa˥˦]
- Region: Dapeng Peninsula, Tung Ping Chau, Ting Kok
- Native speakers: 5,500 (2014)
- Language family: Sino-Tibetan: Sinitic; Chinese; Yue; Yuehai; Guanbao; Dapeng

Language codes
- ISO 639-3: –
- Glottolog: None

The Dapeng dialect (simplified Chinese: 大鹏话; traditional Chinese: 大鵬話) is a Chinese dialect, a variant of Cantonese with a strong Hakka influence that was originally only spoken on the Dapeng Peninsula of Shenzhen, Guangdong, China as well as Tung Ping Chau, Hong Kong. The indigenous language spoken in Ting Kok village in Hong Kong is also related, with influences from surrounding Hakka dialects and Cantonese. The Chinese diaspora has spread the dialect to places with large populations whose ancestral roots are originally from Dapeng, Shenzhen, Guangdong. Today, their descendants live in Hong Kong; the Randstad region of the Netherlands; Portsmouth, United Kingdom; and New York City, United States.

The dialect is a form of Junhua, created as a lingua franca by soldiers at the Dapeng Fortress, who spoke various forms of Cantonese and Hakka. Despite strong influence from Hakka, some, including Lau Chun-Fat, have classified it as a Guan–Bao dialect.
