= Xichong, Shenzhen =

Scenic area in Shenzhen, China

Coordinates: 22.4793°N 114.5310°E

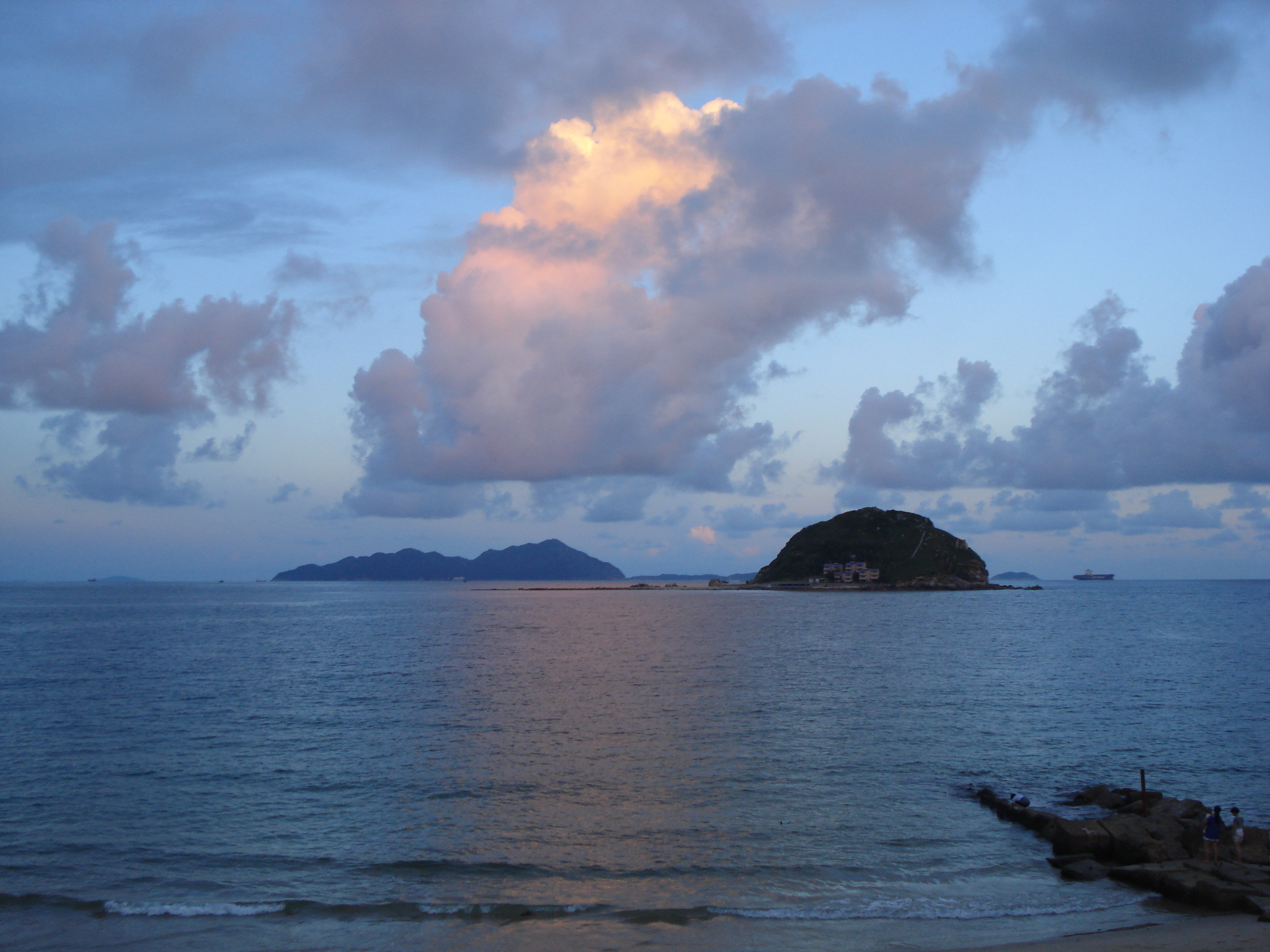
Sunset on the Beach of Xichong

Xichong (Chinese: 西冲 or 西涌) is a scenic spot in the Longgang District of Shenzhen City, Guangdong Province, China located in the southern part of the Dapeng Peninsula, facing the South China Sea with Dapeng Bay on the west and Daya Bay on the East.

Xichong is located within the Dapeng National Park, a recreational and scenic part of the city. In 2006 Chinese National Geographic named the Dapeng Peninsula as one of the ten most beautiful parts of China. To its north is the Qiniangshan, the second highest mountain in the city. To access the beach, private cars can be hired in Dapeng or Nan'ao, and regular buses travel from these towns to Dongchong and Xichong Beaches (M231 and M232). There is also a hiking trail running down the coast between Xichong and Dongchong (approx 10 km).

Xichong and its sister beach Dongchong are popular with backpackers, hikers and surfers.

The Sunshine Holiday Hotel (Chinese: 阳光假日酒店) is a small house situated along a mountain and cliff trail that is two-thirds of the way from Xichong Beach to Dongchong Beach. According to a guidebook, the house is a route landmark, located along a 1-metre (3.3 ft) wide path reached after passing a landslide section of the hillside.

== Transportation ==
Bus E11 from Shenzhen North Station to Xinda Terminus 新大总站

Then bus M232 to Xi Chong village 西涌沙岗村站

== See also ==
- List of beaches
