= Fish in Chinese mythology =

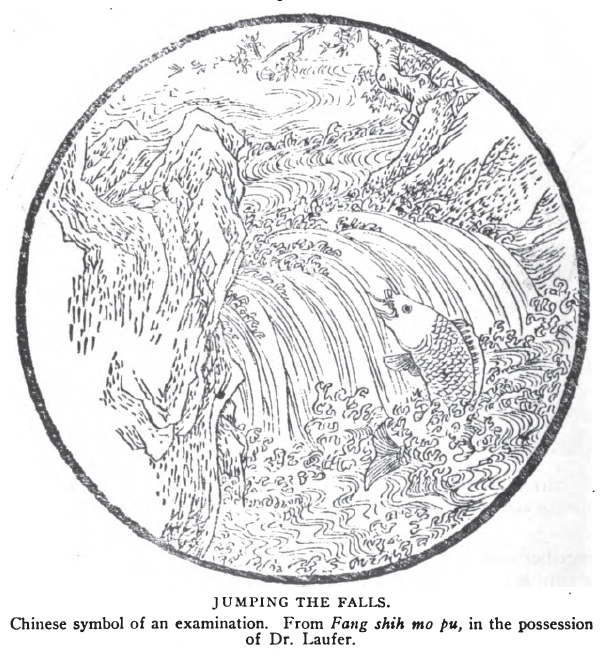
Carp jumping the dragon gate

Fish are an important motif in Chinese mythology. There are various myths involving fish. Chinese mythology refers to those myths found in the historical geographic area of China. The geographic area of "China" is of course a concept which has evolved of changed through history. Fish in Chinese mythology include myths in Chinese and other languages, as transmitted by Han Chinese as well as other officially recognized 56 minority ethnic groups in China. The Chinese word for "fish", yú, is a homophone for "abundance", "plenty", and "affluence" (Chinese: 餘; pinyin: yú); therefore, fishes are a symbol of wealth. The Chinese dragon is the head of the fish clan. The act of fishing is also an important motif in Chinese mythology and culture.

== Cultural significance and symbolism ==
=== Yu (fish) ===
Fishes are a symbol of wealth in Chinese culture. The Chinese character for fish is yu (traditional Chinese: 魚; simplified Chinese: 鱼; pinyin: yú). Though now pronounced with a different tone in modern Chinese, yù (裕), meaning "abundance", originally was a homophone. Alternatively, 餘, meaning "over, more than", is now a true homophone, so the common Chinese New Year greeting appears as 年年有魚 or 年年有餘. Due to the homophony, "fish" mythically becomes equated with "abundance".

==== Fish and humans ====
- A picture of a child with a fish expresses the wishes of having an "abundance of high-ranking sons".
- Due to their association with wealth, fishes are eaten on Chinese New Year as they expresses the wishes of being affluent year by year or "bring abundance of good wishes throughout the year".

==== Fish and flowers ====
- The combination of a fish and a lotus-blossom (莲; lian) is used to express the wishes of living in affluence (yu) year after year (lian nian).
- The combination of a boy with a fish beside a lotus is interpreted as the wish to have "abundance (yu) year in and out (lian)".

==== Fishes and foretelling ====
- According to ancient Chinese literature, an abundance of fishes in water is believed to foretell a good harvest while the fish swarming up the shoals of rivers is interpreted as a harbinger of civil unrest and rebellion against social order.

==== Sacrifices and religion ====
- Fishes were used as sacrifice in China; fish-heads (魚頭; yutou) were sacrificed in Central China to the god of riches as they were believed to symbolize the "beginning of wealth" (餘頭; yutou).
- The fish is part of the 8 Buddhist symbols: they are golden fishes which comes in pairs; they are symbols of fertility and represents salvation from suffering.

==== Sexuality/ marital bliss ====
- In ancient China, the word yu also meant penis as a secondary meaning, however nowadays, it is the eel which is used instead of fish.
- A metaphor for sexual intercourse in Chinese is "fish and water come together".
- A happily married couple is described as having "the pleasures of fish in water" (鱼水之欢; yúshuǐ zhīhuān); therefore pairs of fishes are symbolism of sexual harmony and mutual sexual pleasure. Popular weddings gifts were prints of fishes swimming together.
- When the fish constellation is visible in sky, it is interpreted that the time of "cloud and rains" (云雨; yunyu) have passed, which means that it is no longer the auspicious time for the Emperor to have sexual intercourse.

=== Jin yu (Goldfish) ===
金鱼; Jinyu is a homophone for "gold in abundance"; therefore, they are perceived as suitable gifts for wedding. Jinyu is also an homophone of gold (金; jin) and jade (玉; yu), which are both indicators of wealth.

==== Goldfish and humans ====
- The depictions of goldfish in a pond (塘; tang) is used to express "may gold and jade fill your house" (金玉滿堂; jinyu mantang) to describe the wishes of having a prosperous household.
- A similar depiction is the combination of goldfish in a pond in the courtyard of a house with a wealthy lady with 2 infants and her attendant which symbolically expresses for wish of having "gold (jin) in abundance (yu) fill the whole hall (tang) of the house".

==== Goldfish and flowers ====
- When combined with a lotus (荷; he), the goldfish and lotus (jinyu tonghe) combination represents "gold and jade joined together" or "celebrations with gold and jade" (jinyu tonghe)

==== Goldfish and purse ====
- The combination of a purse and a goldfish is used to express the wishes for having "gold (goldfish) in abundance in a purse."

==== Sexuality ====
- A pair of gold fishes is a symbol of fertility.
- A goldfish can also represent the lover of a widow.
- A goldfish can also represent a man who is supported by a prostitute.

=== Li (carp) ===
The word carp in Chinese is li (鲤) which is an homophone for advantage (利; li); therefore, carps are used to express wishes for benefits or advantage in business. Its association with wealth mostly likely comes from the pun liyu (利餘), liyu (鯉魚) also means carp. Li is also an homophone for the character li (力) which means strength, power, and ability.

==== Carp and humans ====
- The picture of a carp being sold by a fisherman to a woman with a child expresses the fisherman's wishes for her to have good income and social advancement.

==== Symbols of perseverance and martial attributes ====
- Carps are symbols of perseverance as they are admired for its struggles against the currents.
- Due to its scaly armour, carps are seen as a symbol of martial attributes.

== Legends and mythologies ==
=== Fish ===
There is a tale dating in the 1st century BC about a giant fish which swallowed a boat.

Some tales involved drunk men turning into fishes. There are also tales involving fish-demons (drunk men transformed into fishes) which could sometimes marry women.

Other tales involved fishes turning into birds.

=== Carp ===
==== Carp leaping the Dragon Gate ====
In Chinese mythology, the Dragon Gate (simplified Chinese: 龙门; traditional Chinese: 龍門; pinyin: lóngmén; Jyutping: lung4 mun4) is located at the top of a waterfall cascading from a legendary mountain. The legend states that while many carp swim upstream against the river's strong current, few are capable or brave enough for the final leap over the waterfall. If a carp successfully makes the jump, it is transformed into a powerful dragon.

==== Wang Xiang ====
In one of the stories depicting his exemplar filial piety, Wang Xiang went to the frozen river as a young boy when his ill mother said that she wanted to eat some carp in the winter. There, he sat on the ice long enough to melt it, and a big carp immediately sprang out of the hole. In another version, Wang Xiang removed his coat and shirt in the cold and melted the ice when the sat on the ice and cried more and more until the ice melted a hole in the ice through his hot tears and body heat; in this version, it is 2 carps which sprang out of the hole immediately.

== Fish-related legends and myths ==
Other Chinese myths are related to fishes; some Chinese mythological motifs also involve fishermen or fish baskets or a fish trap.

=== Fisherman ===
==== Fuxi ====
According to Chinese myth, the culture hero Fuxi invented fishing after the Great Flood catching fishes and making nets. He is also credited for teaching how to eat fish.

A story tells that first Fuxi fished with his hands, but after observing a spider catching insects in its web, he invented the rattan net and used it to catch fish, which skill he passed on to his descendants.

==== Taigong ====
Jiang Ziya, the great general and strategist and military mastermind who was key to establishing the Zhou dynasty, was said to have spent years in his old age fishing, but with a straight hook, or no bait, or with his hook dangling above the water: but, he was fishing for a Lord, not a fish. After Jiang Ziya became the general, he was known as "Taigong" or "the Grand Duke". The degree to which this qualifies as a myth is open to question, but it is certainly a well-known motif.

=== Fish basket ===
According to Chinese myth, Fuxi also invented the fish basket, or trap (gu), by weaving bamboo into a cage which had a funnel opening, that was easy for the fish to enter because the big opening was on the outside, but inside it tapered to narrow and exit opening, so it was easy for the fish to get in, but hard to get out. In other cases the fish basket served more as a net, in which a fish could be scooped from the water and transported to the market.

In one manifestation, Guanyin is pictured as holding a fish basket. This imagery is sometimes considered to have a sexual connotation.

== Evolution of Chinese characters ==
The character for fish (魚) evolved from an ancient pictograph. It is the traditional 195th (out of 216) traditional radical. Over time, the pictographic representations tended to become increasingly stylized, until evolving to the modern standard form:

script type	example
Oracle script	魚-oracle
Bronzeware script	
Great seal script	
Seal script	

== Gallery ==
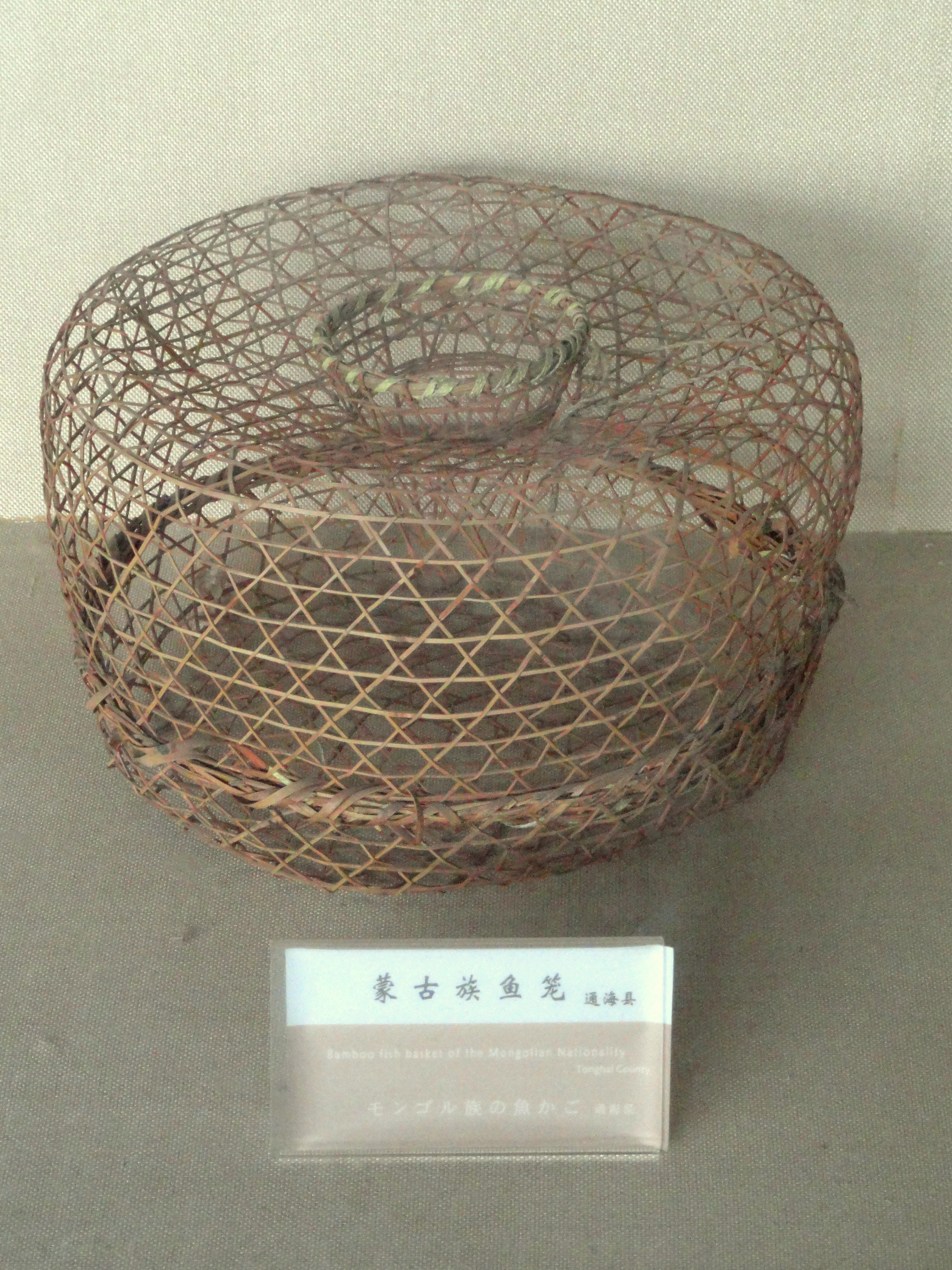
Mongolian bamboo fish basket. Tools and utensils in the Yunnan Nationalities Museum, Kunming, Yunnan, China.

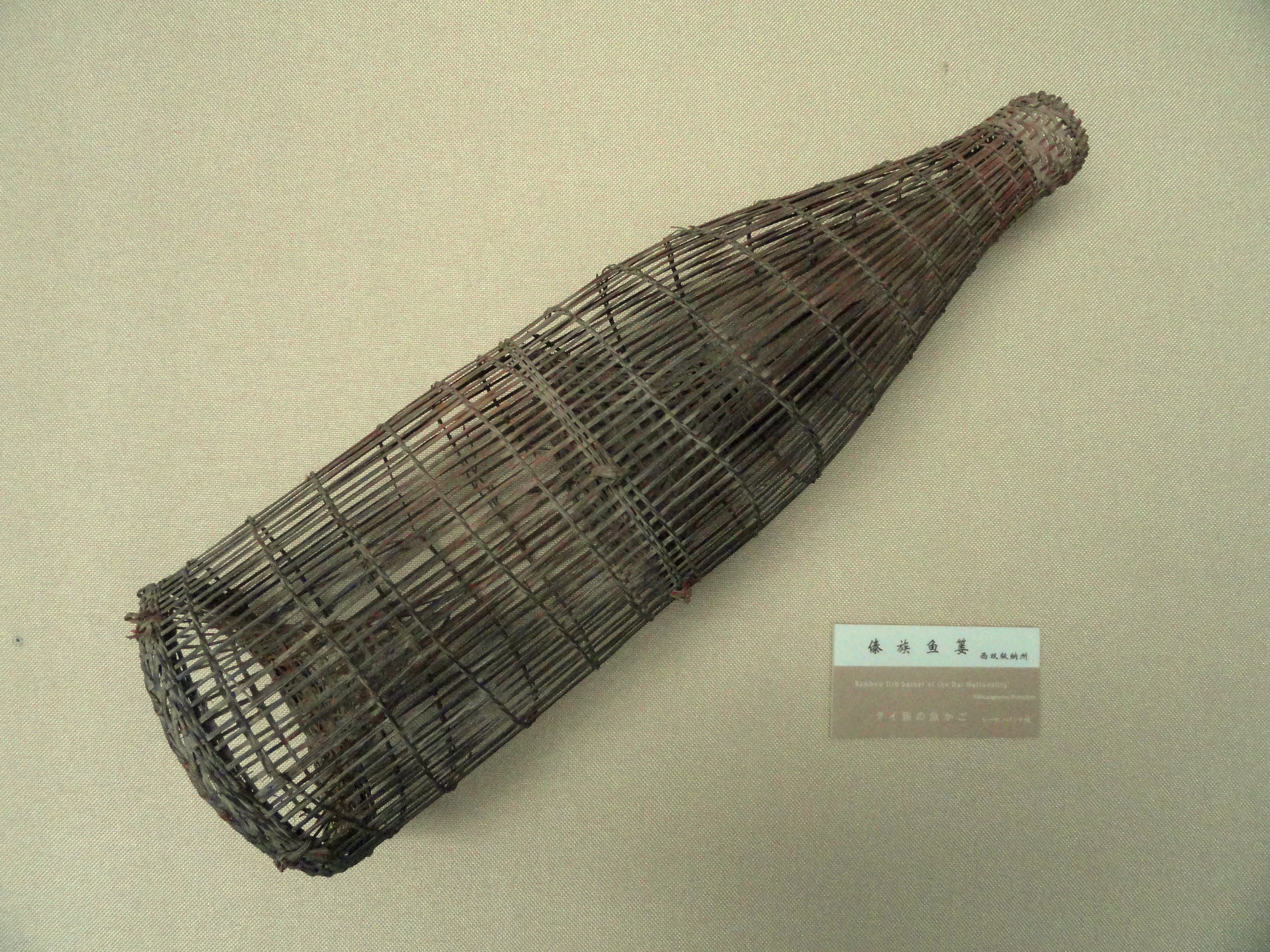
Dai bamboo fish basket. Tools and utensils in the Yunnan Nationalities Museum, Kunming, Yunnan, China.

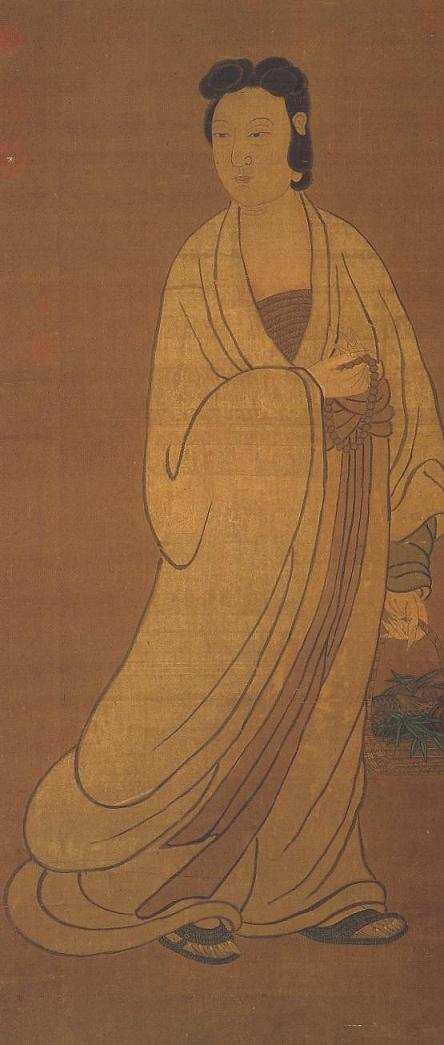
Guanyin of the fish basket – attributed to Zhao Mengfu Yuan dynasty.

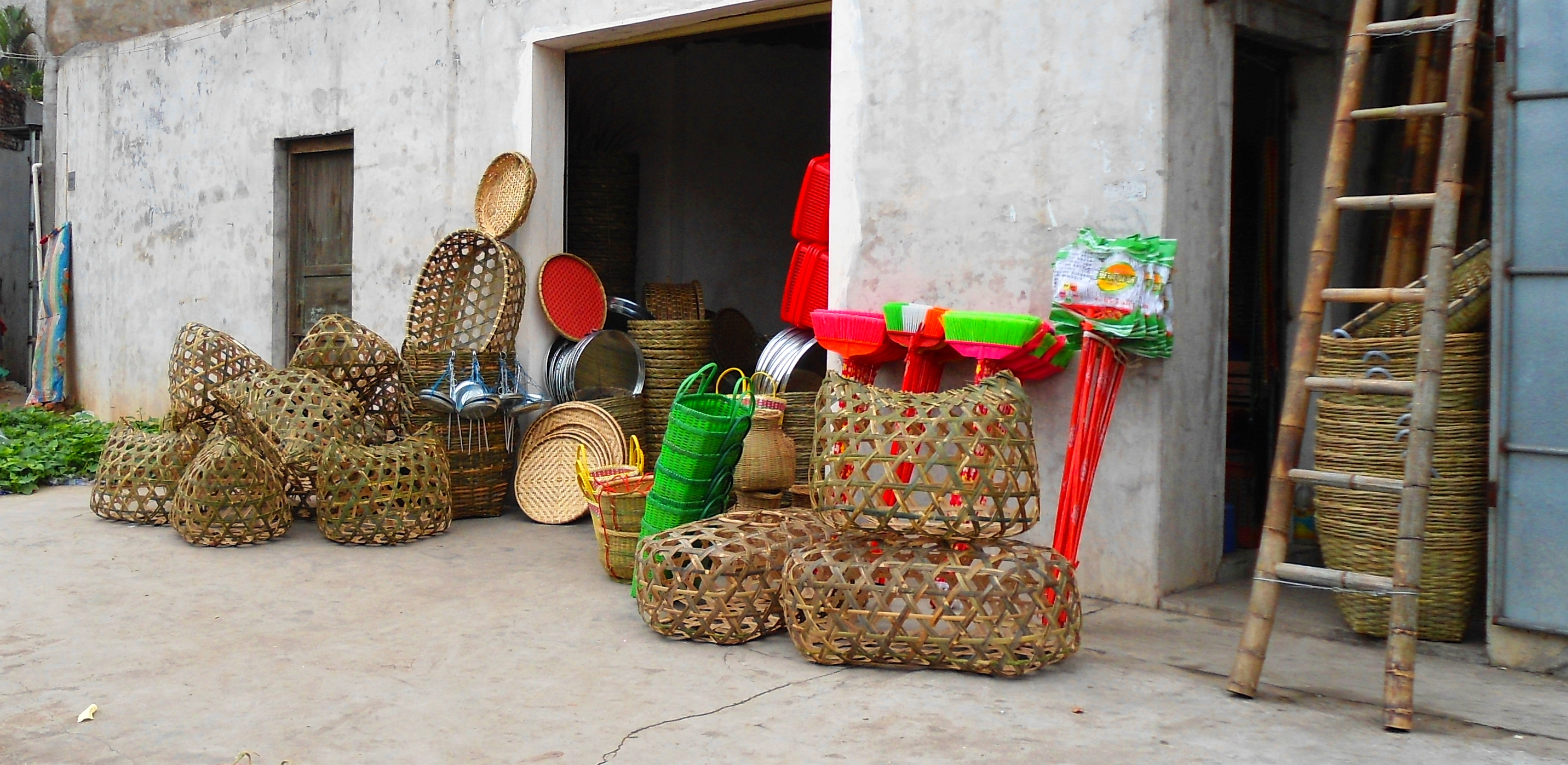
Baskets in Haikou: the flat baskets at center are for holding small fish or shrimp.

== See also ==
- Longnü#In folk tales
- Merlion
- Peng (mythology)
- Yu Fu
