= Dapeng International Plaza =

Skyscraper in Guangzhou, Guangdong, China

Zhengjia Huanshi Center
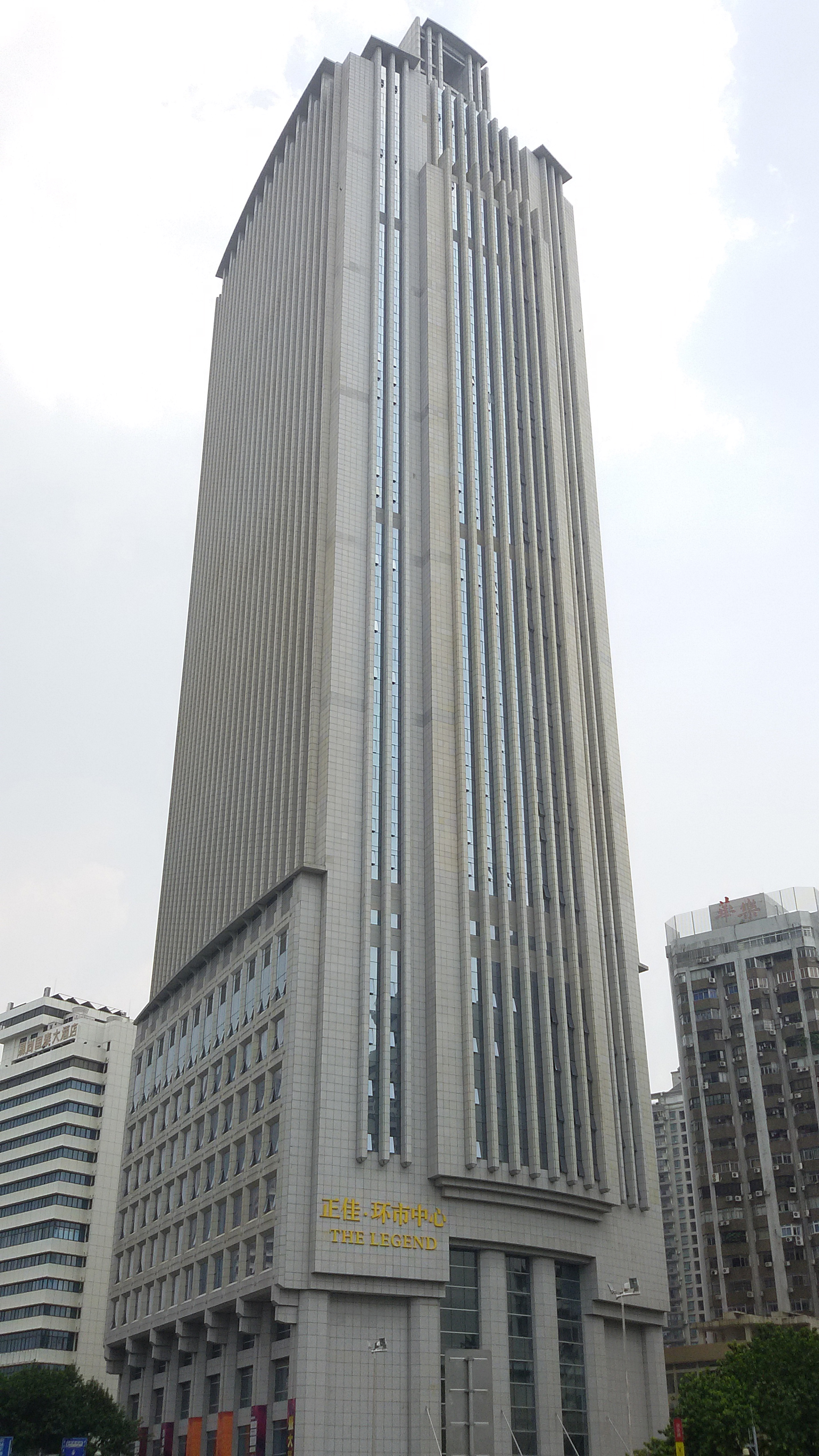
- Interactive map of the Zhengjia Huanshi Center area

General information
- Status: Completed
- Type: Commercial offices
- Architectural style: Modernism
- Location: Huanshi Road East, Yuexiu District; Guangzhou, Guangdong, China
- Coordinates: 23.13822°N 113.2822°E
- Construction started: 2003
- Completed: 2006

Height
- Antenna spire: 269.4 m (884 ft)
- Roof: 213 m (699 ft)

Technical details
- Floor count: 56; 4 below ground
- Floor area: 131,792 m^{2} (1,418,600 sq ft)

Design and construction
- Architect: Guangzhou Design Institute
- Structural engineer: Guangzhou Design Institute

Zhengjia Huanshi Center (simplified Chinese: 正佳环市中心; traditional Chinese: 正佳環市中心; pinyin: Zhèngjiā Huánshì Zhōngxīn) is a 56-storey, 269 m (883 ft) skyscraper in the Yuexiu District of Guangzhou, Guangdong, China. The building was completed in early 2006 following numerous construction delays, including once for a year between 2004 and 2005.

The top floor of the tower is 213 m (699 ft) above ground and the building is 269.4 m (884 ft) to the top of the spire. The building has 56 office floors above ground and four underground floors of vehicle garages.

The entire building was designed by the Guangzhou Design Institute and an internal floor area of 131,792 m^{2} (1,418,600 sq ft).

== See also ==
- List of skyscrapers
