= Guangdong Dapeng LNG terminal =

LNG terminal in China

The Guangdong Dapeng LNG is China's first liquefied natural gas import terminal. The terminal was completed in 2006. Guangdong Dapeng LNG Company ltd. was established in February 2004.
