= Qiniangshan =

Mountain in Shenzhen, China

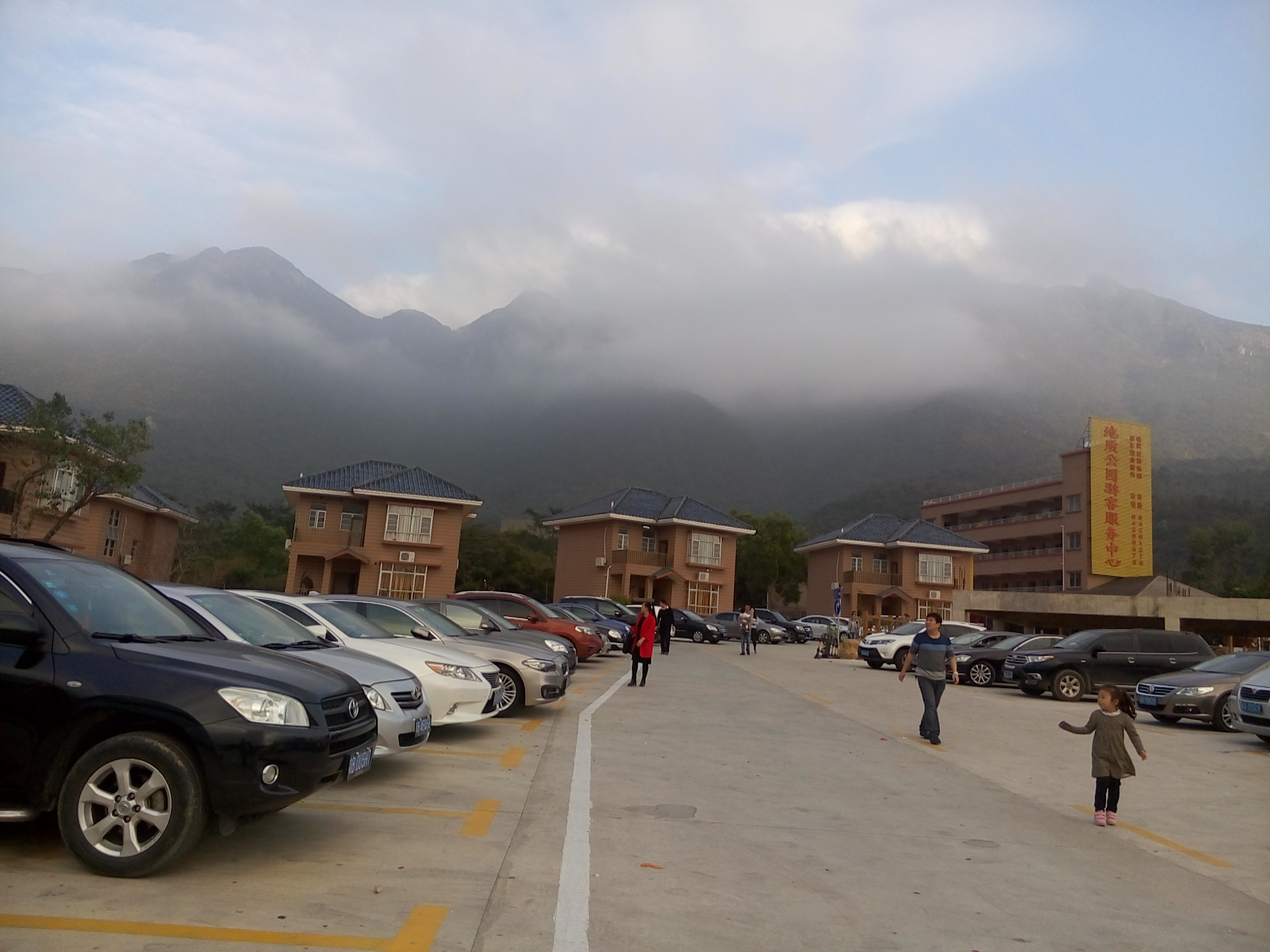
- Qiniangshan

Highest point
- Elevation: 869 m (2,851 ft)
- Coordinates: 22°31′30″N 114°32′38″E

Geography
- Location: Dapeng Peninsula, Shenzhen, China

Qiniangshan (Chinese: 七娘山) is a mountain in Nan'ao Subdistrict, Dapeng Peninsula. At 869 metres above sea level, it is the second tallest mountain in Shenzhen after Wutongshan. It is located within the Dapeng National Geopark. Trekking here is moderately difficult and offers views of Shenzhen, Hong Kong and the South China Sea.
