= Tung Ping Chau =

Island in Hong Kong

東平洲
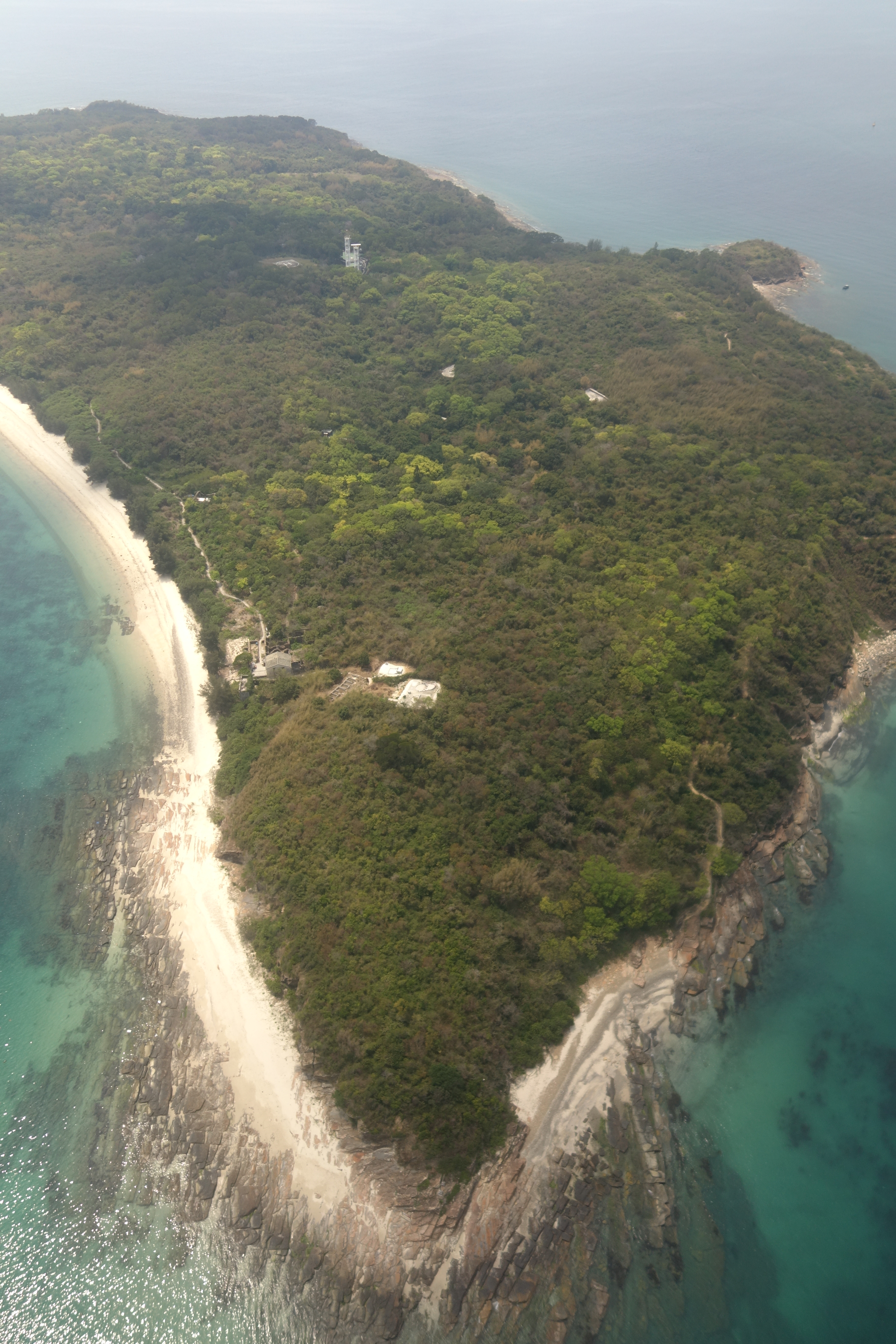
- Aerial view from Northeastern tip

- Tung Ping Chau in Hong Kong (red)

Geography
- Location: Mirs Bay
- Coordinates: 22°32′36″N 114°25′50″E
- Area: 1.16 km^{2} (0.45 sq mi)
- Highest elevation: 48 m (157 ft)

Administration
- Hong Kong
- Region: New Territories
- District: Tai Po District

Demographics
- Population: Uninhabited

Tung Ping Chau
- Traditional Chinese: 東平洲
- Simplified Chinese: 东平洲
- Jyutping: Dung^{1} ping^{4} zau^{1}
Transcriptions
Standard Mandarin
- Hanyu Pinyin: Dōngpíng Zhōu
Yue: Cantonese
- Yale Romanization: Dūng pìhng jāu
- Jyutping: Dung^{1} ping^{4} zau^{1}

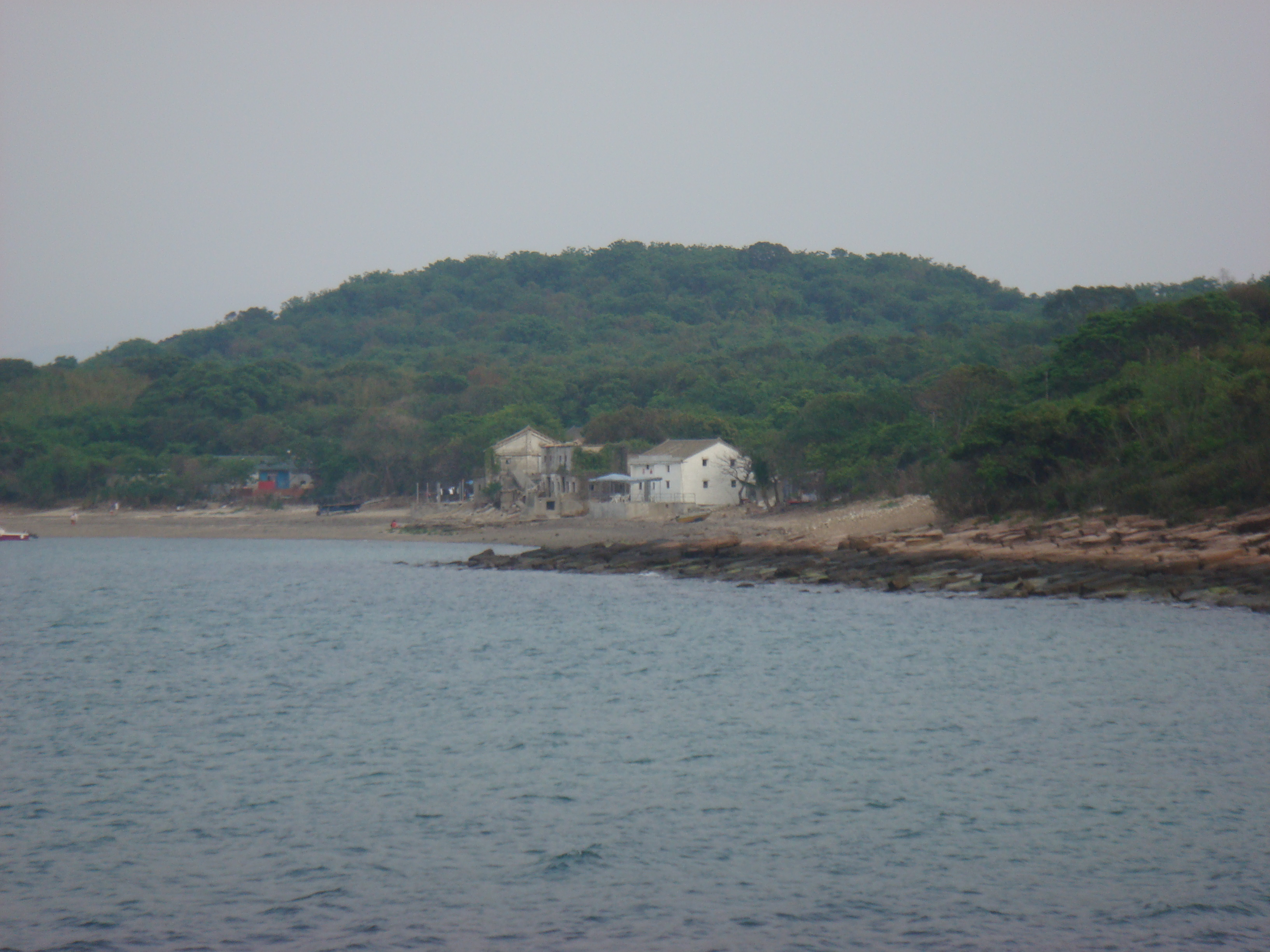
View of the village of Sha Tau, on Ping Chau.

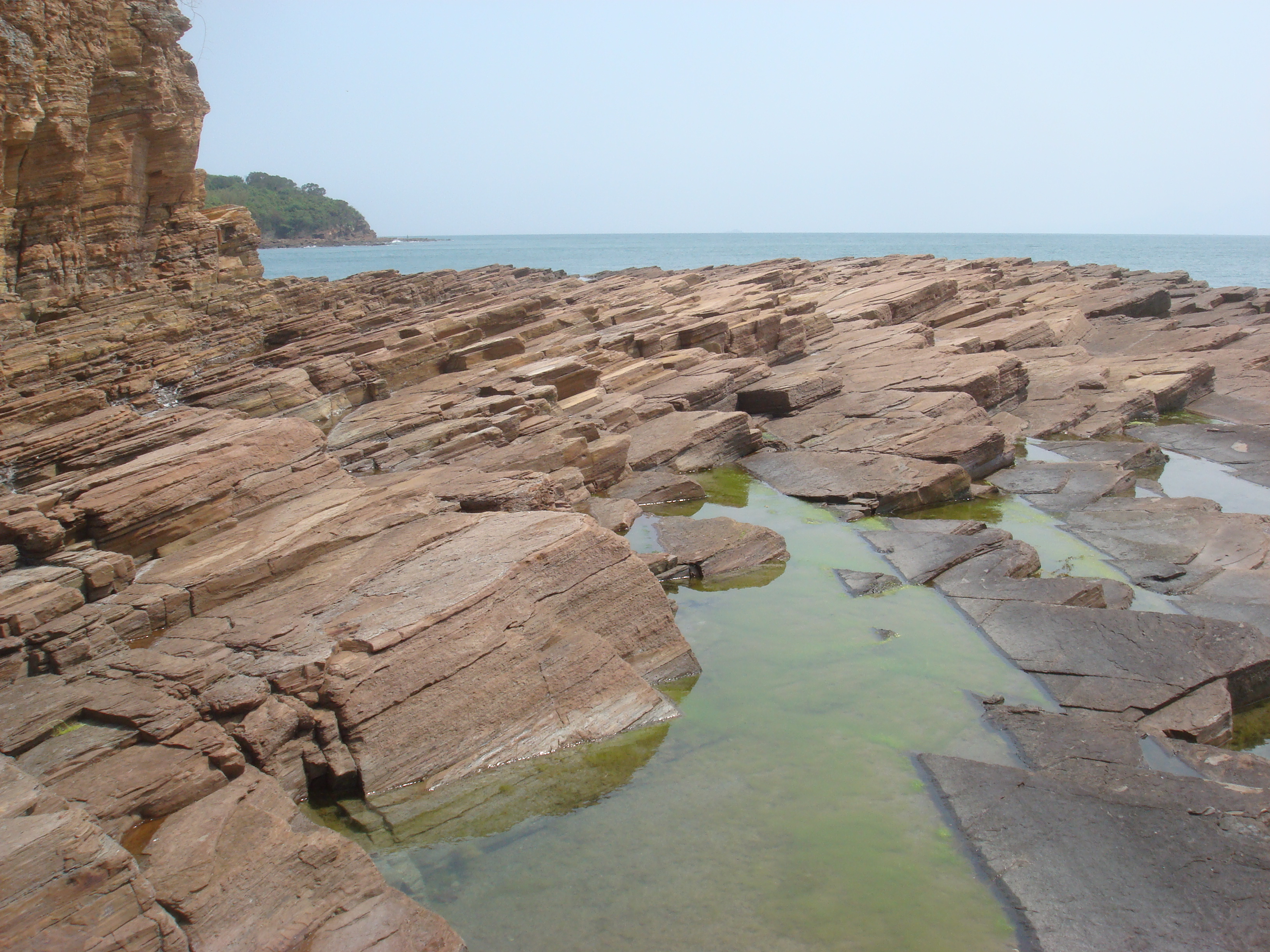
Ping Chau

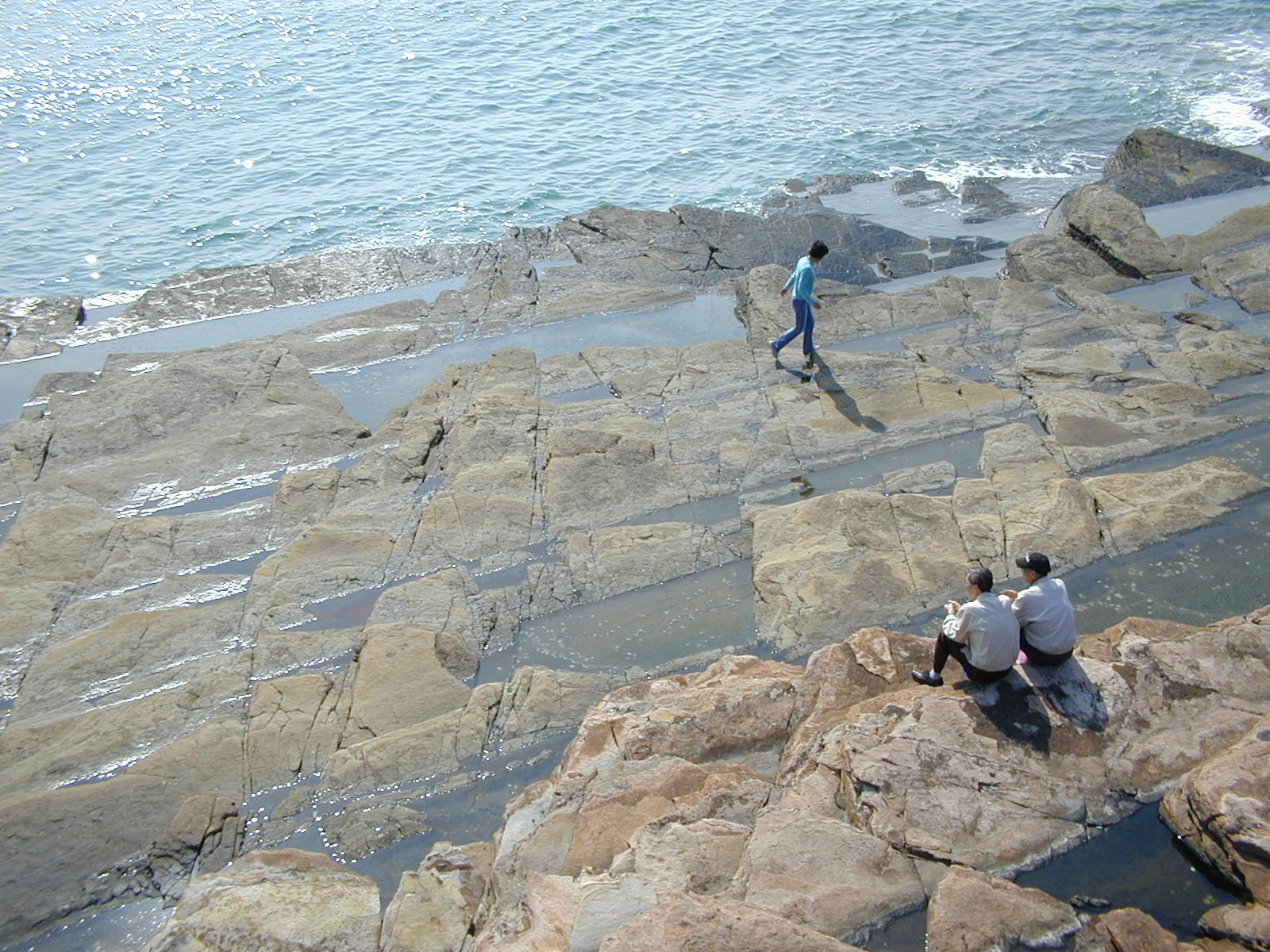
A wave-cut platform on Ping Chau.

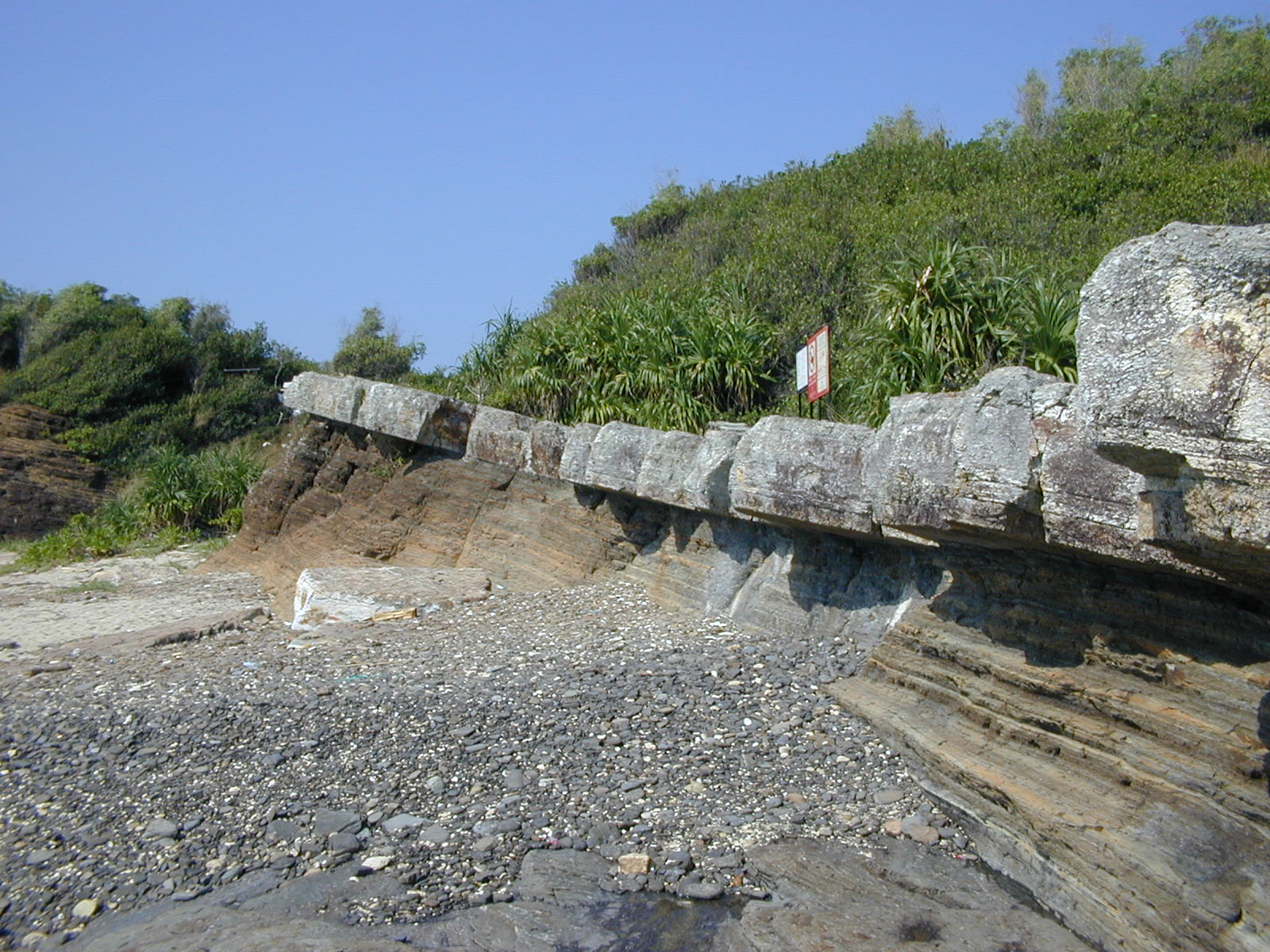
Lung Lok Shui (龍落水)

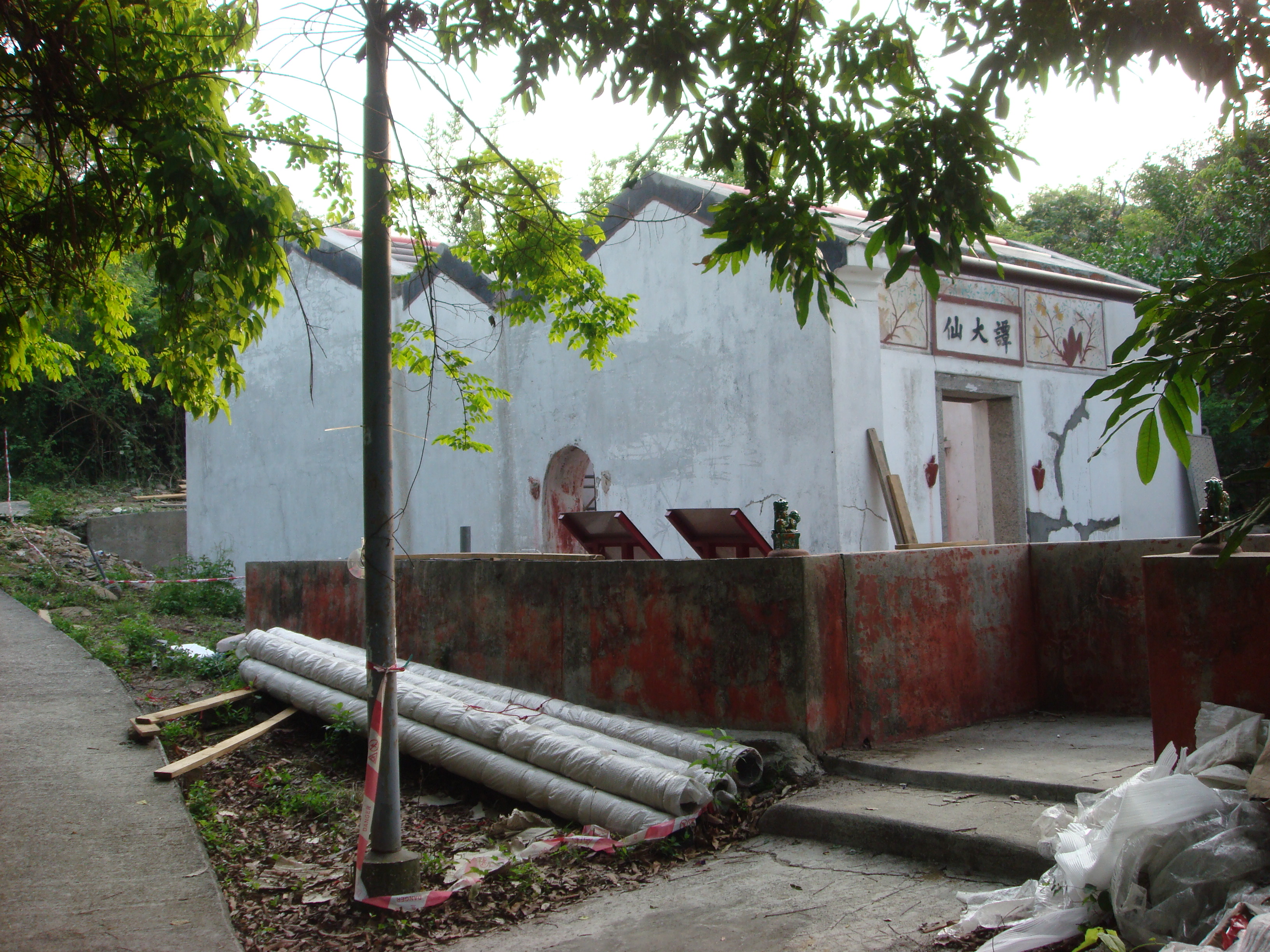
Tam Kung Temple in Sha Tau

Tung Ping Chau (Chinese: 東平洲) is an island in Hong Kong, part of Hong Kong UNESCO Global Geopark. It is also known as Ping Chau (平洲). Tung (東, meaning east) is prepended to the name at times so as to avoid possible confusion with Peng Chau, another island in Hong Kong with an identically pronounced name in Cantonese. Administratively, the island is part of the Tai Po District in the New Territories.

== Geography ==
Geographically, Ping Chau is an offshore island located in the northeast corner of Hong Kong in Mirs Bay, close to the border with Guangdong Province in mainland China. The island has an area of 1.16 km^{2} and consists of shale rock. The island is the most easterly point of the Hong Kong territory and is much closer to mainland China (4 km) than to the main landmass of Hong Kong. It is close to Nan'ao of Dapeng.

The island has the shape of a kidney bean with its concave side facing northeast. Its name "Ping Chau" means "flat island" in Chinese. The highest points on the island are 48 metres (157 feet) in the south and 37 metres (121 feet) in the north. The eastern inner shore of the crescent hugs Ping Chau Hoi (平洲海) with a few beaches, including Cheung Sha Wan (長沙灣) in the northeast. In contrast, the western coast of the island is fairly rocky as a result of the greater wave action taking its toll on the inclined siltstone there.

The island's largest village, Sha Tau (沙頭), is something of a ghost town, with many cottages boarded up. A large part of the island is country parkland, with footpaths overgrown with orchids, wild mint and morning glory.

== History ==
Ping Chau has a checkered history. Guns and opium were once smuggled from here, and during the Cultural Revolution many mainlanders swam in hopes of reaching Ping Chau and the freedom of Hong Kong.

The now virtually deserted island was once home to a thriving fishing and farm community of 3,000 people, with over 100 fishing junks. Historical villages of Ping Chau included the five oldest: Chau Mei (洲尾), Chau Tau (洲頭), Nai Tau (奶頭), Sha Tau (沙頭) and Tai Tong (大塘), as well as five other smaller family villages, which were subsequently developed: Chan Uk (陳屋), Lam Uk (林屋), Lei Uk (李屋), Tsau Uk (鄒屋) and Tsoi Uk (蔡屋). The village of Chau Mei was settled by fishermen who sold their catch at Tai Po Market and at Shayuchong (沙魚涌), a coastal village now part of the Longgang District of Shenzhen.

During the Japanese occupation of Hong Kong (1941–1945), Ping Chau was used as a logistics base for the supply of military resources, including petrol, to the Chinese army. Several allied military leaders were transported to the mainland via the island.

In the 1950s, there were about 1,500 people living in the ten villages on the island. Two primary schools were built: Kwan Ying School (群英學校) in Tai Tong and Wai Sun School (維新學校) in Chau Tau. At that time, the economy of the island deteriorated due to the depletion of fishery resources and the termination of trade with the mainland as a consequence of the Korean War (1950–1953). During the Cultural Revolution (1966–1976), political turmoil cut off commerce with the mainland and most villagers moved away. By the early 1970s, only a few elderly people remained on the island. In 2004, the last permanent resident moved out of Tung Ping Chau. Some may return on weekends. In 2013, the District Offices estimated that Tung Ping Chau had a population of 8.

== Villages ==
The villages of Ping Chau Chau Mei (平洲洲尾), Ping Chau Chau Tau (平洲洲頭), Ping Chau Nai Tau (平洲奶頭), Ping Chau Sha Tau (平洲沙頭) and Ping Chau Tai Tong (平洲大塘) are recognized villages under the New Territories Small House Policy.

== Geology ==
Ping Chau is unique in the fact that it is the only sizeable island in Hong Kong made up of sedimentary rock. Hong Kong is mostly formed of extrusive igneous rocks, after a series of major volcanoes erupted during the Jurassic Period. Following the volcanic activity, a basin formed in the northeast, with deposition in a brackish lake—producing the siltstones and chert of Tung Ping Chau, which have been dated from the early Paleogene period. It is also home to some spectacular cliffs and wave-cut platforms. Landforms such as these are very rarely found in the rest of Hong Kong.

Cham Keng Chau (斬頸洲, "Chop Neck Islet"), in the northwest, is a chunk of land that has broken away from the island; the Chinese say it represents the head of a dragon. Another notable rock formation is Lung Lok Shui (龍落水, "Dragon Descend into Water"), on the southwestern coast, thus named because it resembles the spine of a dragon entering the sea. At the island's southeastern end are two large rocks known as the Drum Rocks, or Kang Lau Shek (更樓石, "Watchman's Tower Rocks"). They are 7-to-8-metre (23-to-26-foot) sea stacks on a wave-cut platform. Lan Kwo Shui (難過水, "Difficult-to-cross Waters") features a long vertical cliff located along the southern coast, where several caves were formed there as a result of long term wave actions. Lan Kwo Shui can be reached by foot from Kang Lau Shek, at low tide and in calm sea conditions.

== Demographics ==
In the 1950s and 1960s, about 2000 were estimated to live on the island. Over the years the number of residents has dwindled to a mostly elderly population of about 50–60 total people. Many early residents of Ping Chau were from Shantou (Swatow) and they kept the tradition of worshiping Tam Kung after they settled on the island. The island even had its own dialect, the Ping Chao dialect. Nowadays no longer spoken by many, you may still hear this dialect in the conversations between the villagers inside the restaurants.

== Tourism ==
The island has a temple dedicated to Tin Hau, built in 1765, and a temple dedicated to Tam Kung: the Tam Tai Sin Temple (譚大仙廟), built before 1877. Both temples are located in the village of Sha Tau. Several other old buildings can be found on the island. On one side of the island there are steep cliffs, below which is an amazing wave-cut platform, with jagged rocks, set at a 30-degree angle, like a staircase. Here there are many rock pools containing all manner of marine life, such as sea urchins and crabs. On the island's coastline at the pier side, there are over 60 different species of coral, and 35 species of algae.

During the weekends, many people visit the island. These include those who have come to dive and those who have come to see the cliffs and wave-cut platforms. Some people also use it as a weekend home. 57,000 people visited Ping Chau in 2005.

There is a camping site as well as picnic and barbecue sites on the island, managed by the Agriculture, Fisheries and Conservation Department. A few basic restaurants can be found at Tai Tong, a short distance north of Tung Ping Chau Public Pier. Basic dorms are available at Tai Tong Wan (大塘灣) and A Ma Wan (亞媽灣).

== Conservation ==
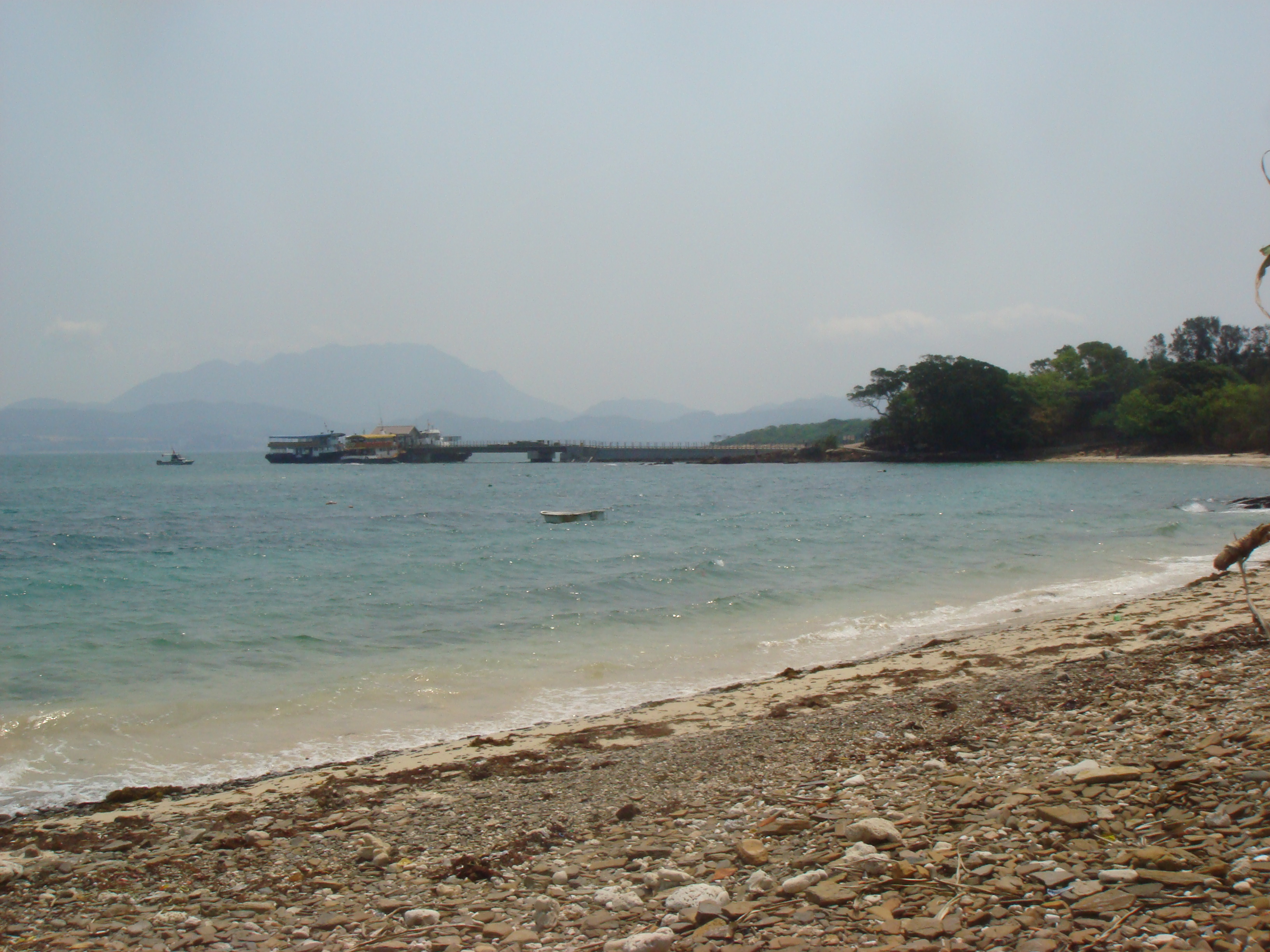
Tung Ping Chau Public Pier viewed from Tai Tong Wan.

Three buildings of Ping Chau are listed as Grade III Historic Buildings: the Tin Hau Temple, the Tam Tai Sin Temple, both in the village of Sha Tau, and the Old House, built in the 1940s in Chau Mei by Lee Mou-you (李戊有).

Ping Chau has been designated as a Site of Special Scientific Interest since 1979.

With the exception of an area of old villages along its east coast, Ping Chau is part of the Plover Cove (Extension) Country Park, designated in 1979.

The Tung Ping Chau Marine Park was designated in 2001 as the fourth Marine Park in Hong Kong. It occupies a sea area of about 270 hectares which encloses the island of Ping Chau.

Ping Chau is one of the eight Geo-Areas of the Hong Kong Global Geopark, which was inaugurated in November 2009.

== Transportation ==
The island is reachable by ferry from Ma Liu Shui ferry pier, near the Chinese University of Hong Kong. The landing point is the Tung Ping Chau Public Pier (東平洲公眾碼頭), the only public pier on Ping Chau, located near the centre of the island at Wong Ye Kok (王爺角). Improvement works on the pier were completed in 2007. The ferry service is operated by Tsui Wah Ferry on Saturdays, Sundays and public holidays only. The journey takes 1 hour 40 minutes.

== See also ==
- List of islands and peninsulas of Hong Kong
- Magic Cop, a 1990 Hong Kong film partially set in Ping Chau
