= Dapeng Peninsula =

Peninsula in Shenzhen, China

Native name: 大鹏半岛
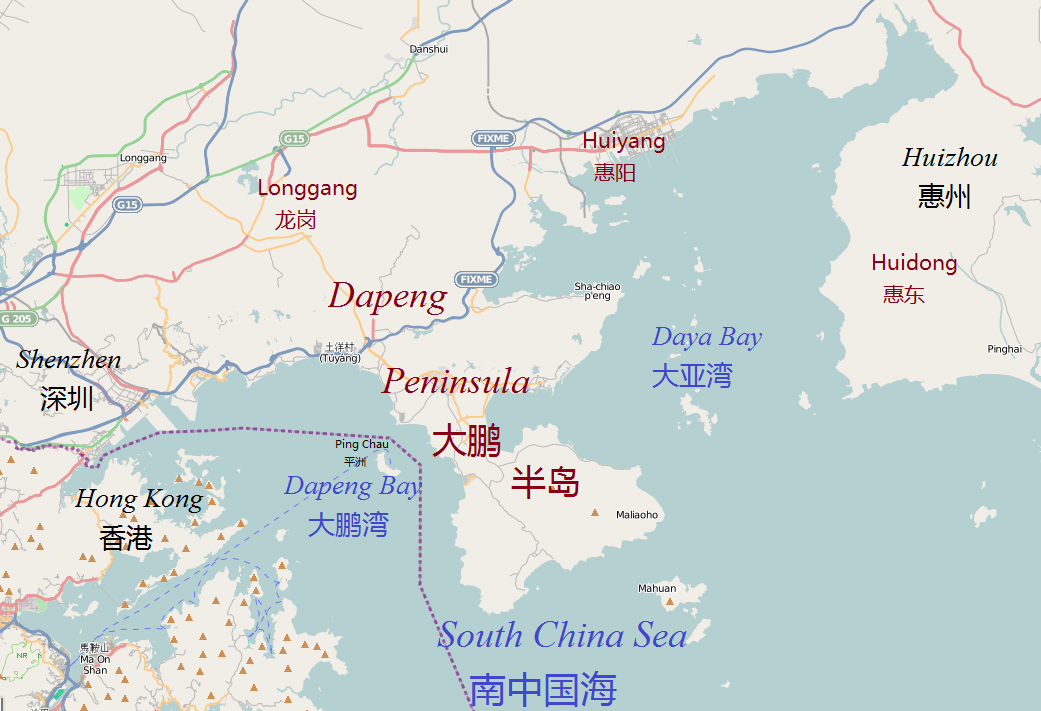
- Dapeng Peninsula

Geography
- Coordinates: 22°31′N 114°32′E
- Area: 294.18 km^{2} (113.58 sq mi)
- Coastline: 133.22 km (82.779 mi)
- Highest elevation: 869 m (2851 ft)
- Highest point: Qiniangshan

Administration
- China
- Province: Guangdong
- City: Shenzhen
- District: Longgang District

Dapeng Peninsula or Dapengbandao (大鹏半岛) is a peninsula in the east of Longgang district, that lies in the easternmost part of Shenzhen in the Guangdong Province in China. To the southwest of the peninsula is Mirs Bay and to the northeast is Daya Bay. The Dapeng dialect is the main dialect across the whole peninsula. The Dapeng Fortress (Dapengcheng) was built to protect the inhabitants from attacks by Japanese pirates (wokou) during the late Ming Dynasty. During the Second Opium War there was a possibility of annexation as part of British Hong Kong. Ultimately the area was never occupied by the British. During the Cultural Revolution the region saw a major famine, just like the rest of rural China.

== Geography ==
The Dapeng Peninsula extends southwards from continental China and is surrounded by Mirs Bay to the west and Daya Bay to the east. The peninsula encompasses 294.18 km^{2} in land area and has a 133.22 km long coastline. The peninsula is located near several islands under the jurisdiction of Huizhou. Tung Ping Chau (an island in Hong Kong) is located off the west coast of the peninsula. The Yanba Expressway (Provincial Highway S30) runs through the northern areas of the peninsula, and the provincial highway S359 runs through the entirety of the peninsula, ending at the southern tip of the peninsula. The highest point of the peninsula is Qiniangshan, which is located at 869 metres above sea level.

== Tourism ==
The Dapeng Peninsula is a noted tourist attraction, and the peninsula itself was selected as one of the most beautiful beaches of China by Chinese National Geography. One of the best beaches is Xichong, in the south of the peninsula. DaPeng Peninsula is one of the few industrialized beachfront cities, and it is part of Shenzhen.

== Notable people ==
- Lai Enjue
- Deanie Ip

== Gallery ==
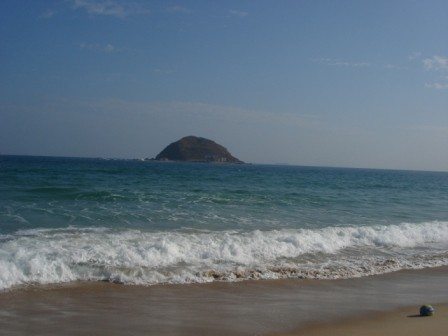
The beach at Xichong

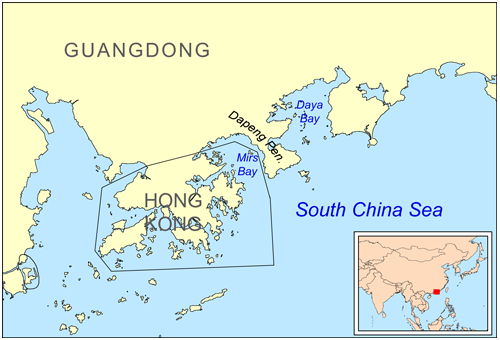
Map showing location of the peninsula

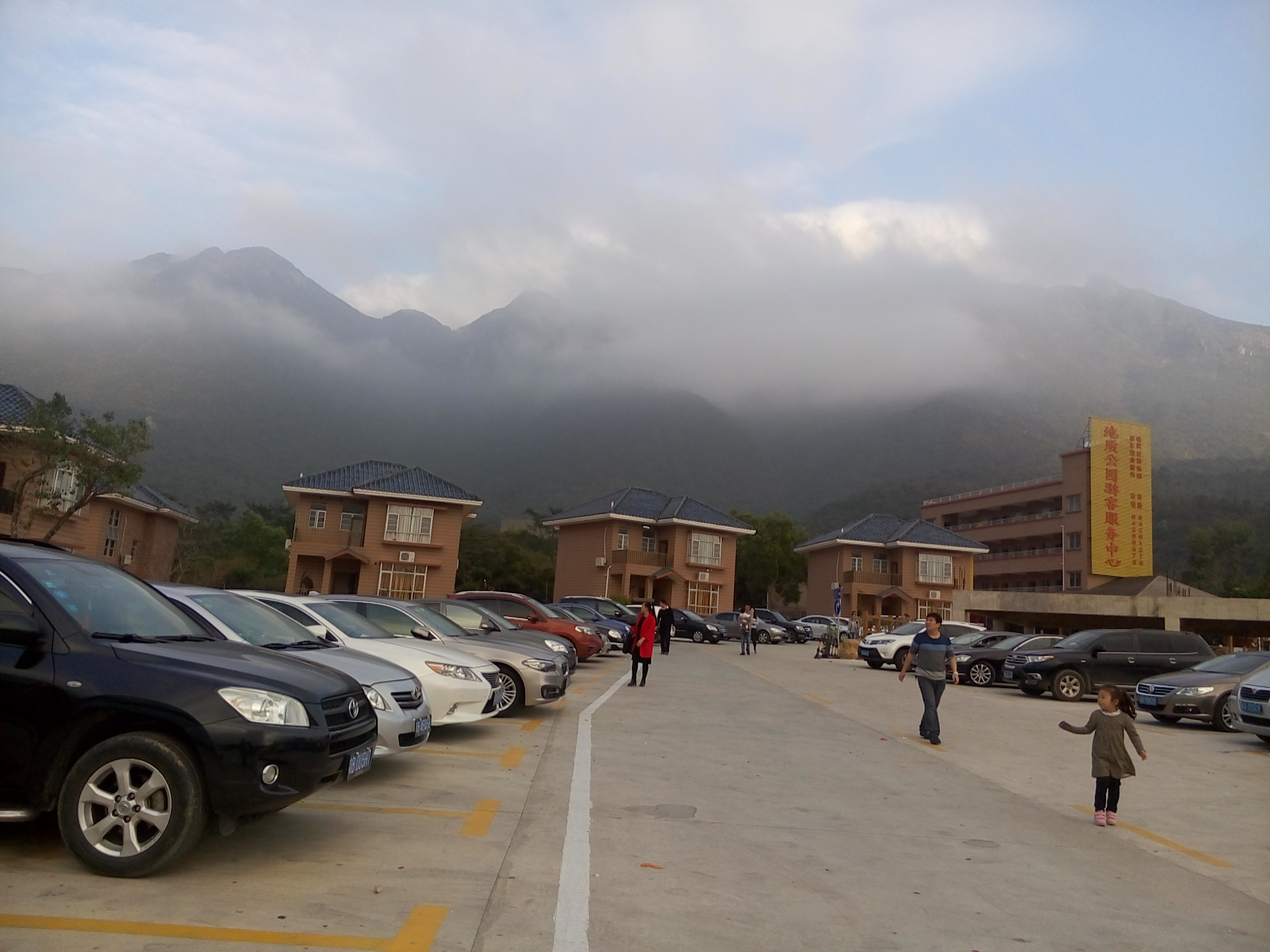
Qiniangshan, which is the tallest point on the peninsula
