= Dapeng Fortress =

Walled village in Guangdong province, China

Coordinates: 22°35′49″N 114°30′32″E

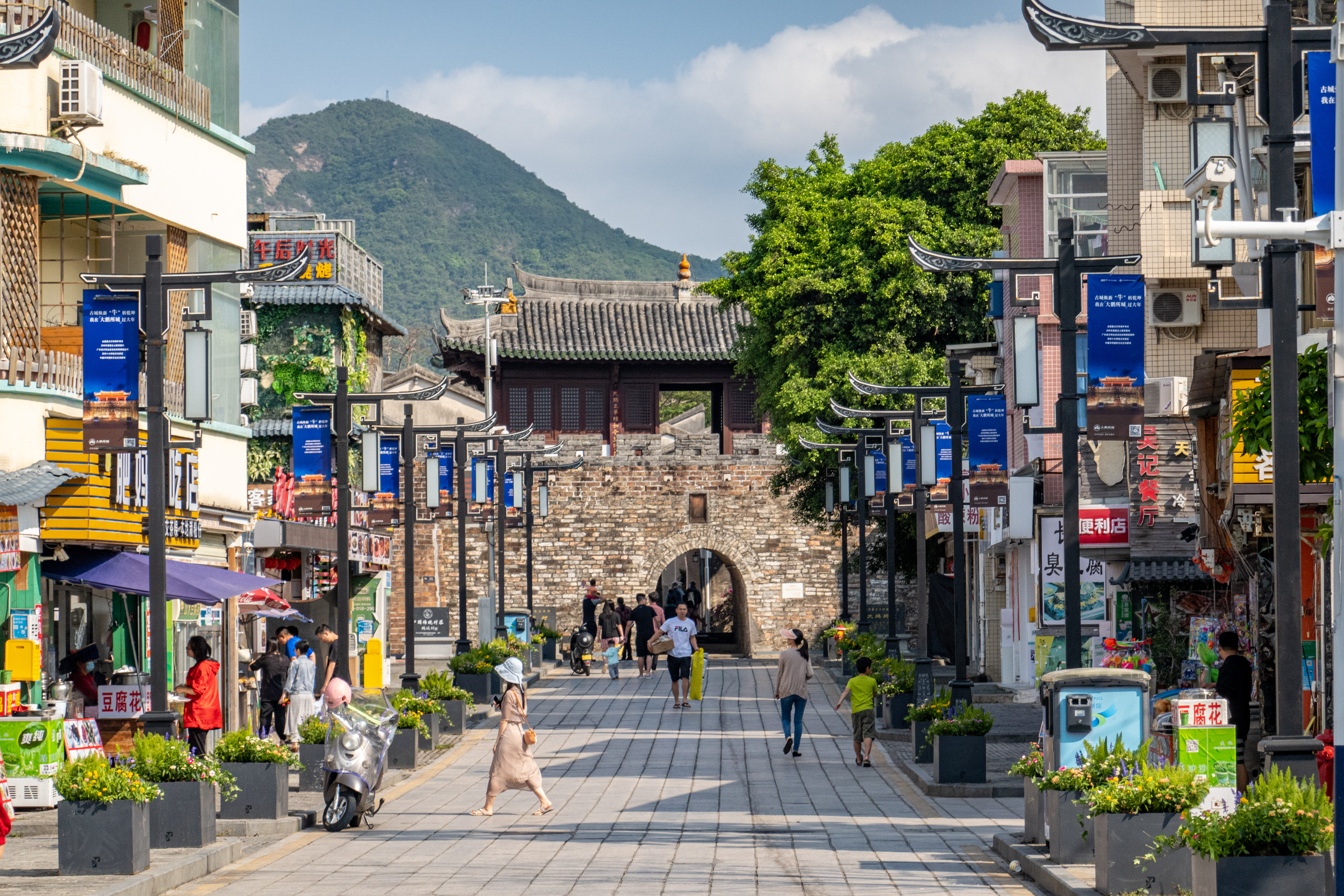
Entrance gate of Dapeng Fortress

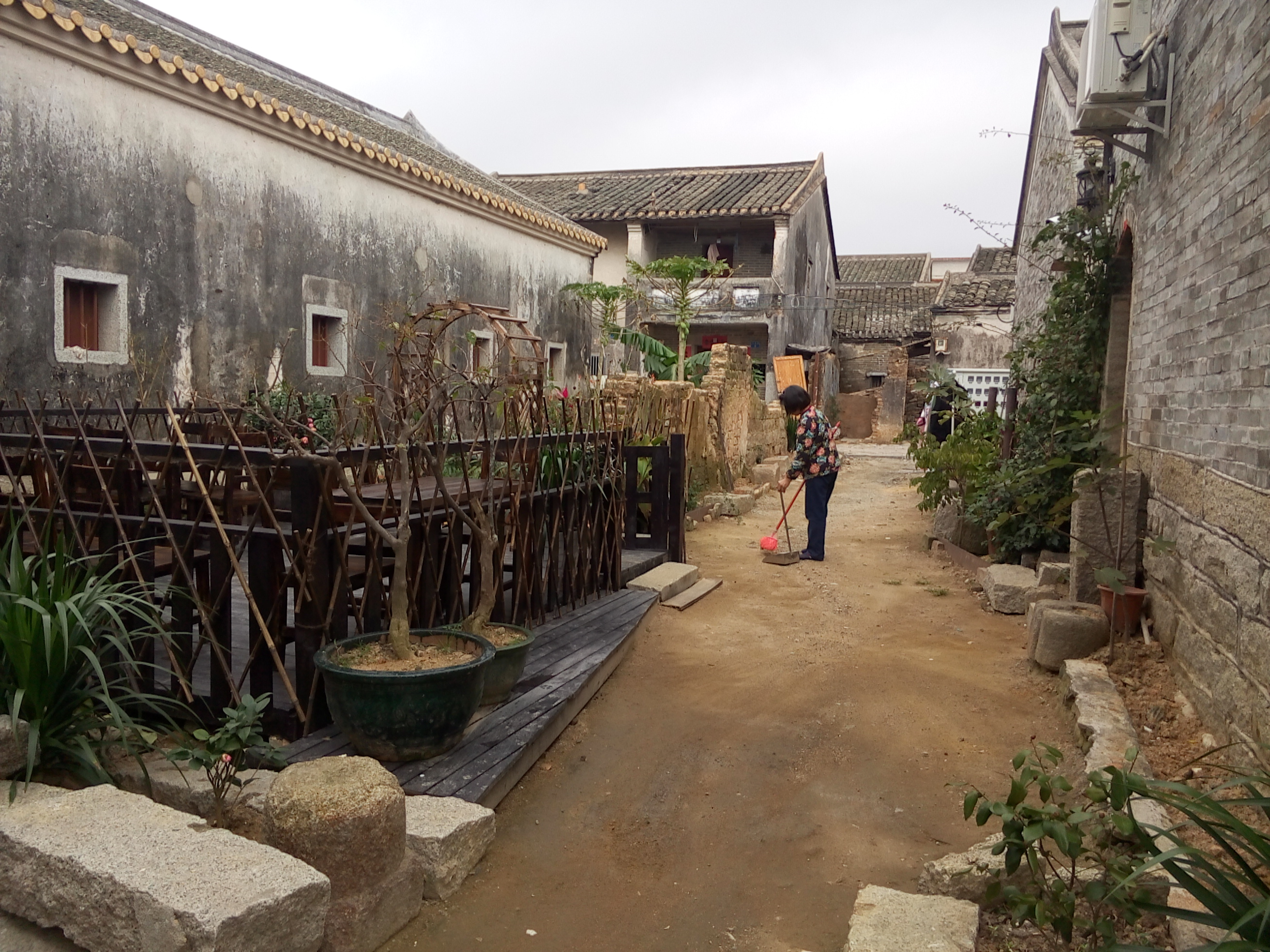
Dapeng Fortress

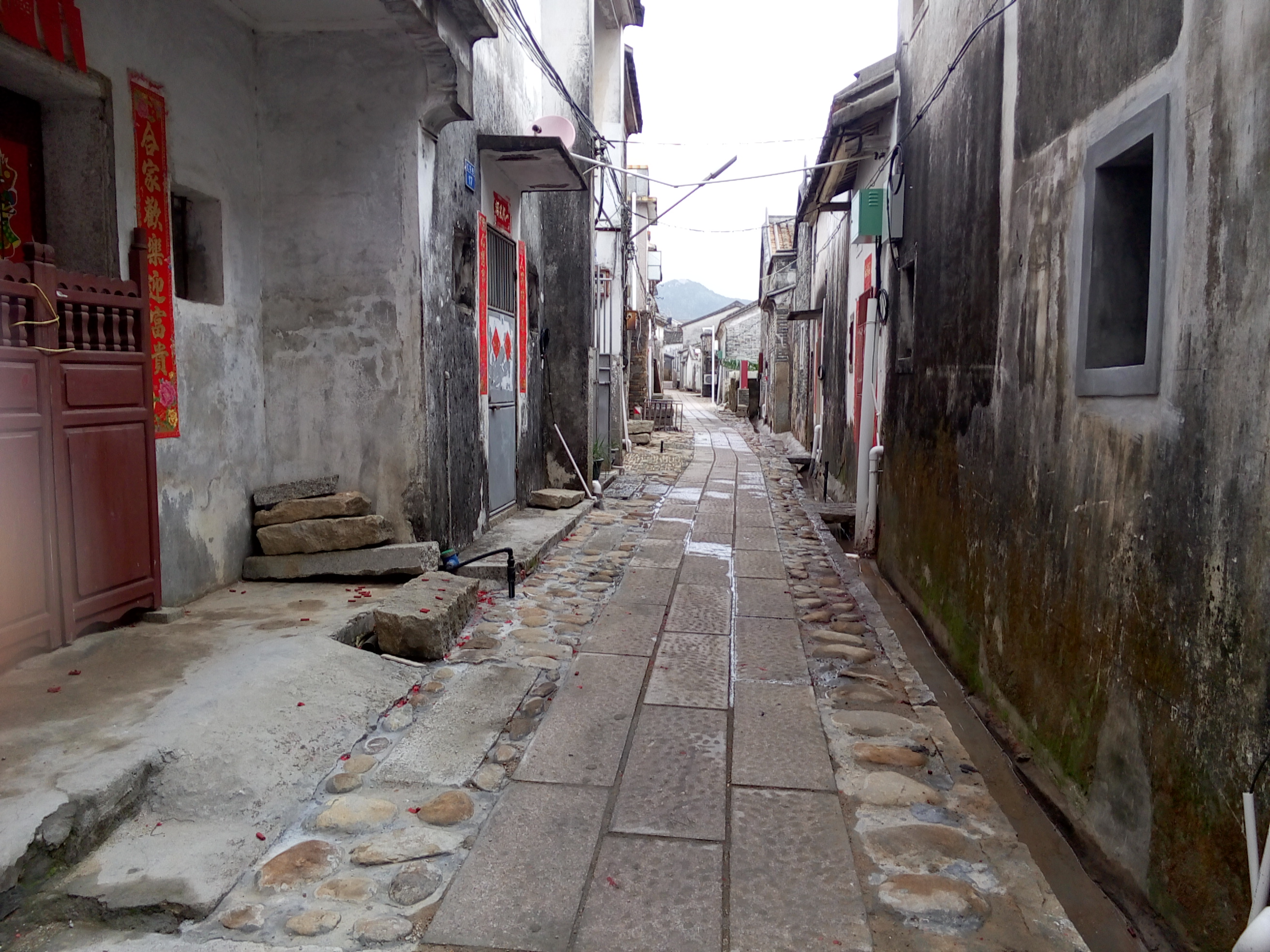
An alley within the fortress

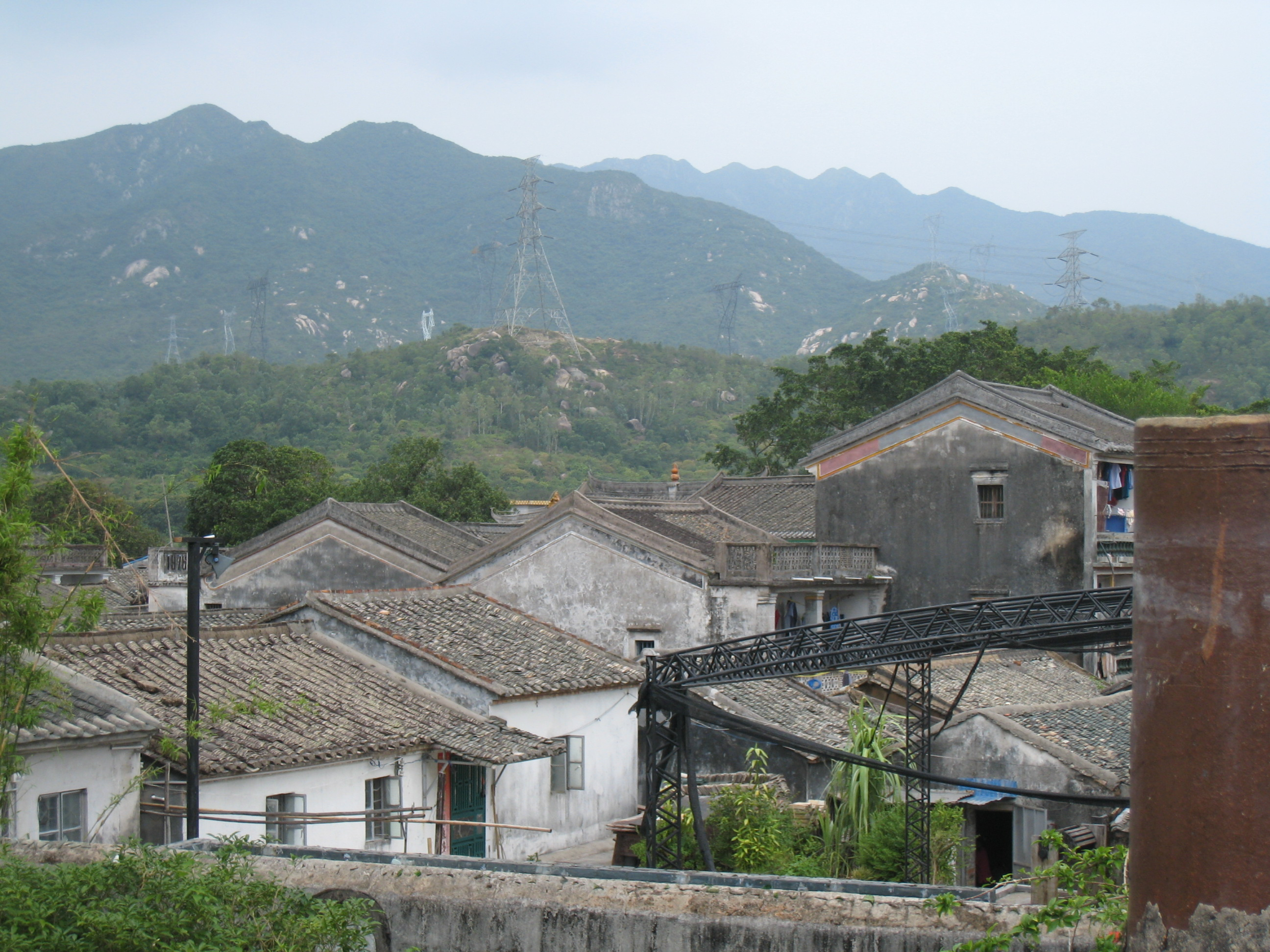
Traditional houses in Dapeng Fortress

Dapeng Fortress (Chinese: 大鹏城; pinyin: dàpéngchéng; Jyutping: daai6 paang4 sing4; Dapeng dialect [tʰaːi pʰuŋ saːŋ]) or Dapengsuocheng is a walled village in the subdistrict Dapeng, district Longgang, Shenzhen, Guangdong province, China. The village lies 55 kilometers from the center of Shenzhen.

== History ==
Dapeng Fortress was built in 1394 to protect the area from pirates. It later developed into a town during the Ming and Qing dynasties.

In 1571, it sustained a siege of over forty days by Japanese pirates equipped with scaling ladders.

The main dialect in this village is Dapeng dialect, a mix of Hakka and Cantonese. Dapeng defended the Thousand Household City, referred to as Dapeng City for the 27th year of Hongwu in the Ming dynasty (1394), and its main function was to resist the invasion of pirates. In the Ming dynasty, Dapeng City was mainly against the invasion of pirates.

In the Qing dynasty, Dapeng defended the Thousand Households City as Dapeng Marine Master Camp, and established nine districts such as Dongyongkou, Shuishitang, Lantau, Red Incense Burner, Yantian, Guanhutang, Laodapeng, Shangshatang, and Xiashatang. In the flood season, it has jurisdiction over the Tuotu, Fotangmen, Nantou and Lantau forts. During the Daoguang period, this city was also one of the strongholds of the Opium War against Britain. At that time, the Qing dynasty navy promoted the Dapeng camp stationed to the Dapeng Association. There were two left and right battalions. The headquarters and the left battalion were located in the Dapeng city, and the right battalion was stationed in the newly built Tung Chung city (located in Tung Chung, Lantau, Hong Kong). Also known as Tung Chung Fort), there are a number of prefectures in the city, among which the General Zhenwei, the anti-British general of the Qing dynasty, was the most spectacular.

The current community of the city is the Pengcheng Community of Dapeng New District [1], and Shenzhen may also be called "Pengcheng".

Since 1983, including the tenth cultural relics site of the Lord's House, it has been listed as a cultural relics protection unit in Shenzhen; in 1989, the Guangdong Provincial Government also recognized Dapeng City as a provincial cultural relics protection unit; the Dapeng Ancient City Museum was established in May 1996, Responsible for the management of Dapeng City.

== See also ==
- Nantou
- Walled villages of Hong Kong
