= Lu Xiangyang =

Chinese billionaire businessman

- 吕向阳
- Born: 1962 (age 63–64); Wuwei, Anhui, China
- Citizenship: China
- Occupation: Businessman
- Known for: Co-founding BYD
- Spouse: Zhang Changhong

Lu Xiangyang (Chinese: 吕向阳; born 1962) is a Chinese entrepreneur and a co-founder of the battery and automaker BYD Company.

== Early life ==
Lu Xiangyang was born in Wuwei, Anhui, China, in 1962.

== Career ==
Xiangyang started his career at the local branch of the People's Bank of China.

At the start of the 1990s, he moved to Guangdong province, where he started working for brokers. Later he even founded Guangzhou Youngy Management and Investment Group.

In 1995, Xiangyang invested 5 million renminbi in newly-formed company BYD, the co-founder of which was his cousin, Wang Chuanfu. The share in the BYD afterwards brought Xiangyang the majority of his fortune.

Later, Xiangyang acquired 70% of the world's second-largest lithium mine in Sichuan, as well as a cobalt mine in the Democratic Republic of Congo.

Xiangyang made the 2022 Forbes Billionaires List, with an estimated net worth of US$15.7 billion, occupying the 114th position.
