= BYD Dolphin G =

Plug-in hybrid supermini car

BYD Dolphin G DM-i
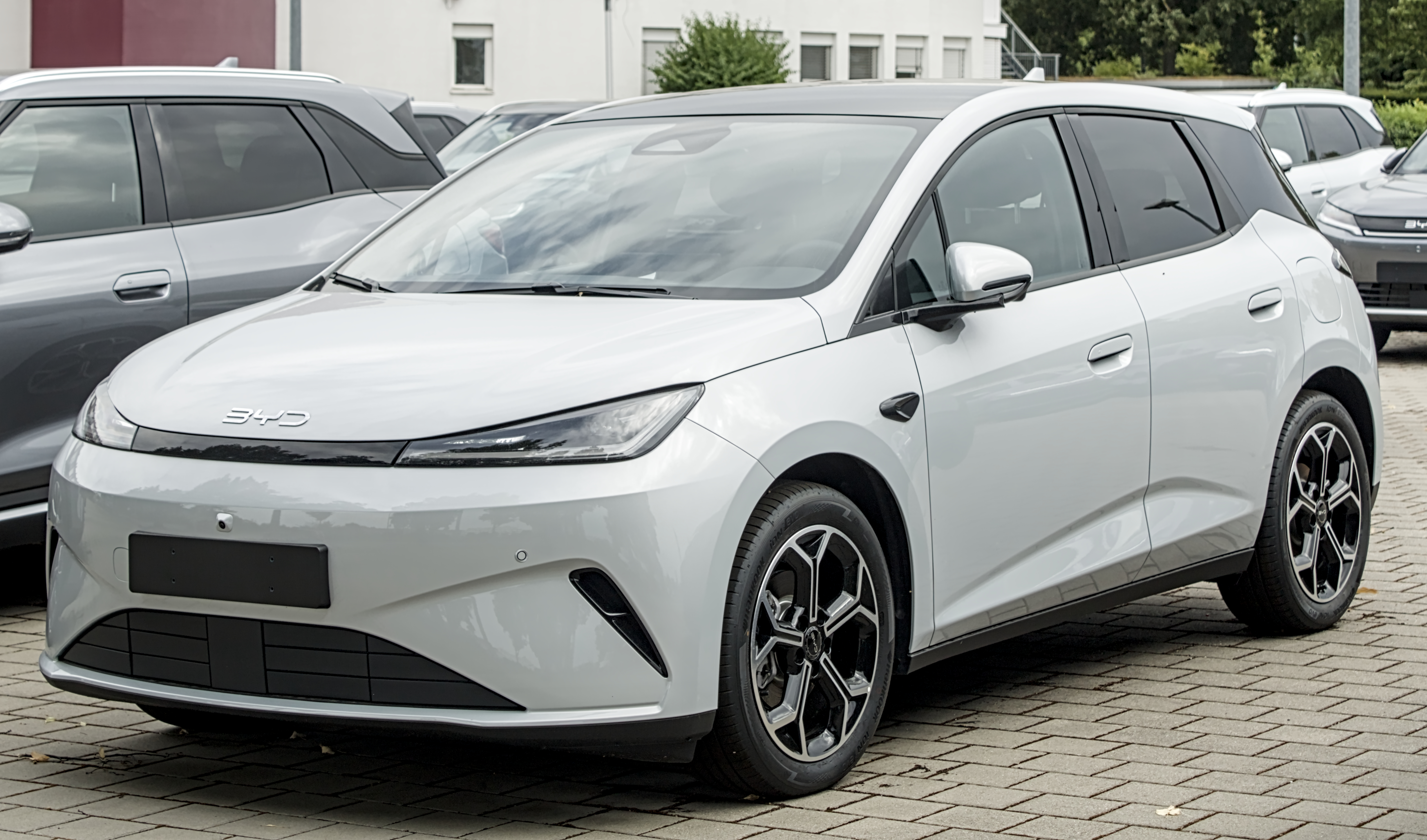

Overview
- Manufacturer: BYD Auto
- Model code: CNH
- Production: 2026–present
- Assembly: China
- Designer: Under the lead of Wolfgang Egger

Body and chassis
- Class: Supermini (B-segment)
- Body style: 5-door hatchback
- Layout: Front-engine, front-motor, front-wheel drive
- Platform: DM-i 5.0 platform
- Related: BYD Atto 2 / Yuan Pro DM-i

Powertrain
- Engine: Petrol plug-in hybrid: 1.5 L I4 Atkinson cycle
- Electric motor: Permanent magnet synchronous
- Transmission: E-CVT
- Hybrid drivetrain: Plug-in hybrid
- Battery: 7.8 kWh BYD Blade LFP; 18 kWh BYD Blade LFP

Dimensions
- Wheelbase: 2,610 mm (102.8 in)
- Length: 4,160 mm (163.8 in)
- Width: 1,825 mm (71.9 in)
- Height: 1,575 mm (62.0 in)

The BYD Dolphin G DM-i is a plug-in hybrid supermini car developed and produced by BYD Auto. Unveiled in May 2026, it is the first BYD vehicle sold in Europe developed specifically for overseas markets rather than adapted from a Chinese market model.

== Background ==
The Dolphin G DM-i was unveiled on 27 May 2026. BYD positioned it as a supermini targeting European markets including the United Kingdom and continental Europe, competing directly against established models such as the Volkswagen Polo, Renault Clio, and Toyota Yaris. BYD designed the vehicle with European urban driving conditions in mind. BYD's executive vice president Stella Li described the B-segment as "one of the most important" in global markets and stated the vehicle was intended to make "sustainable mobility smarter, more practical and available to many more people across Europe."

The Dolphin G DM-i is positioned as a counterpart to the BYD Dolphin and Dolphin Surf hatchbacks. Unlike those models, the Dolphin G DM-i uses a plug-in hybrid powertrain rather than a pure battery electric drivetrain.

A full launch event was scheduled for June 2026, with deliveries commencing in Europe in September. It will first be imported from China, though BYD plans to eventually assemble it in its Szeged, Hungary, plant.

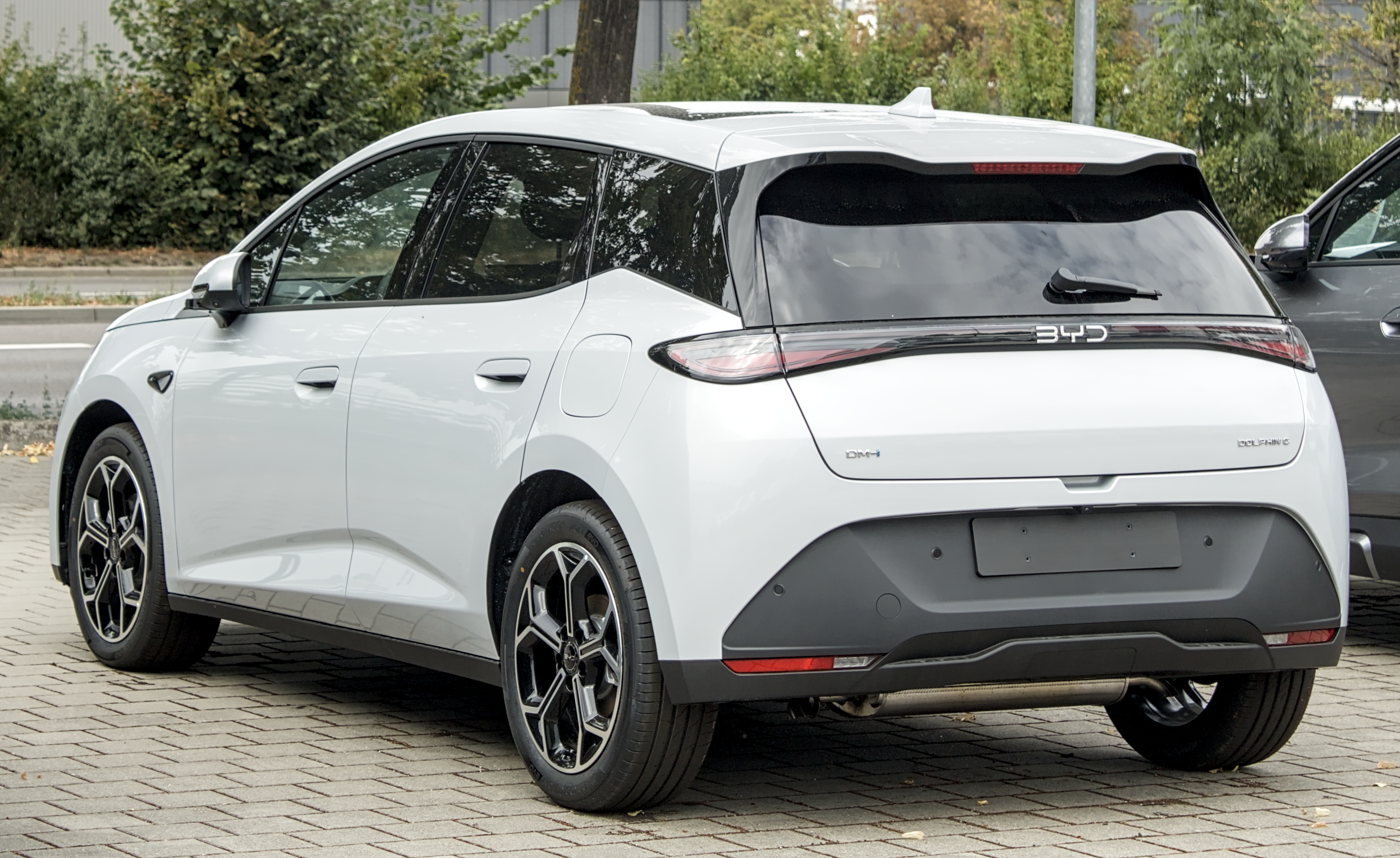
Rear view

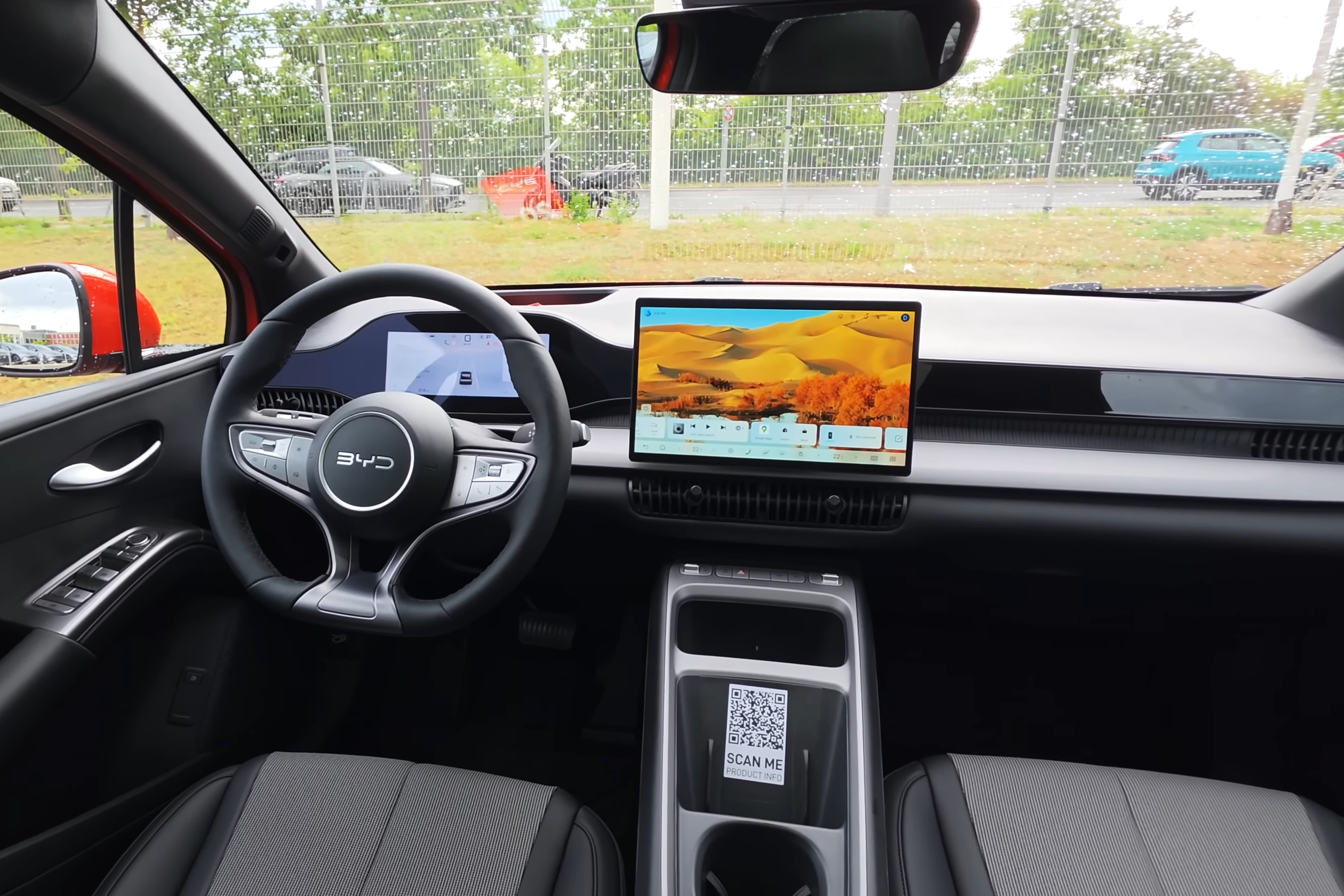
Interior

== Powertrain ==
The Dolphin G DM-i uses BYD's Super Hybrid DM-i system. Based on the related Atto 2 DM-i, which shares the same expected platform and system, the powertrain is anticipated to consist of a 1.5-litre Atkinson-cycle petrol engine operating primarily as a generator, combined with a front-mounted permanent magnet synchronous motor producing approximately 145 kW (194 hp). Two BYD Blade lithium iron phosphate battery pack options are expected: a 7.8 kWh variant and an 18 kWh variant. BYD claims a combined WLTP driving range of over 1,000 km (620 mi) on a full charge and a full tank of fuel.

== See also ==
- List of BYD Auto vehicles
