= Wang Chuanfu =

Chinese chemist and businessman (born 1966)

- 王传福
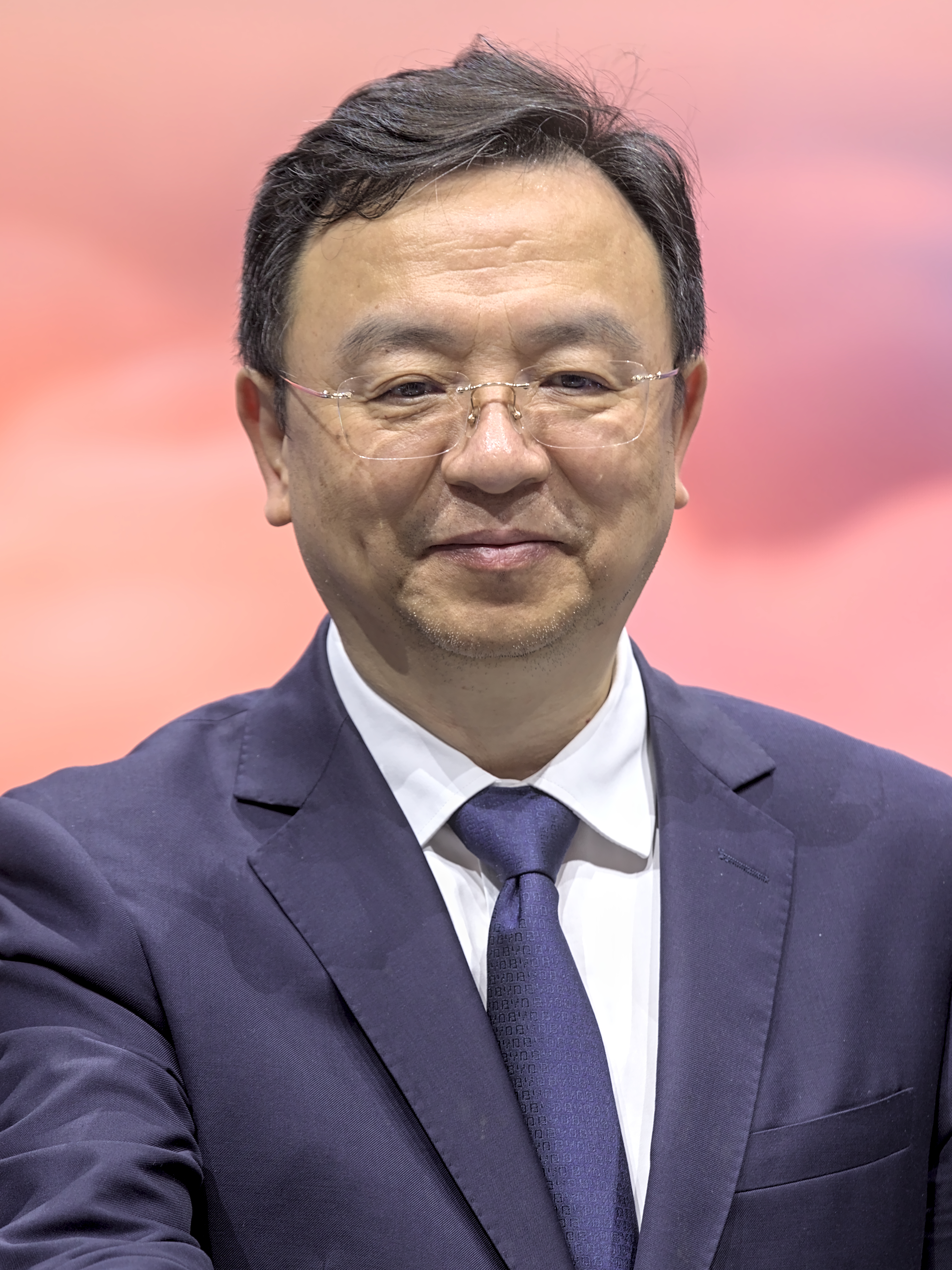
- Wang in 2023
- Born: 8 April 1966 (age 60); Wuwei County, Anhui, China
- Education: Central South University (BS); Beijing Non-Ferrous Research Institute (MS)
- Occupations: Chemist, businessman
- Known for: Founder and CEO of BYD Company
- Political party: Chinese Communist Party
- Spouse: Married

Wang Chuanfu (Chinese: 王传福; born 8 April 1966) is a Chinese chemist, billionaire entrepreneur, and the founder, chairman and CEO of the BYD Company.

Wang was born in Anhui to a poor farmer family. He then studied metallurgy and earned a bachelor's degree and master's degree. After briefly managing a battery company, he founded BYD in 1995 with a loan from his cousin. BYD grew rapidly, and entered the automotive industry in 2003.

BYD Company is currently the world's largest mobile phone batteries manufacturer, and its subsidiary, BYD Auto is the world's largest plug-in electric vehicle manufacturer.

== Early life ==
Wang was born in Wuwei County, Anhui, into a poor farming family with eight children. After the death of his parents, he was raised by his elder brother and sister while attending high school.

After graduating high school, he studied metallurgical physical chemistry at the then Central South Industrial University (nowadays the Central South University) and graduated in 1987. He went on to earn a master's degree in 1990 from the Beijing Non-Ferrous Metal General Research Institute (now GRINM Group).

== Career ==
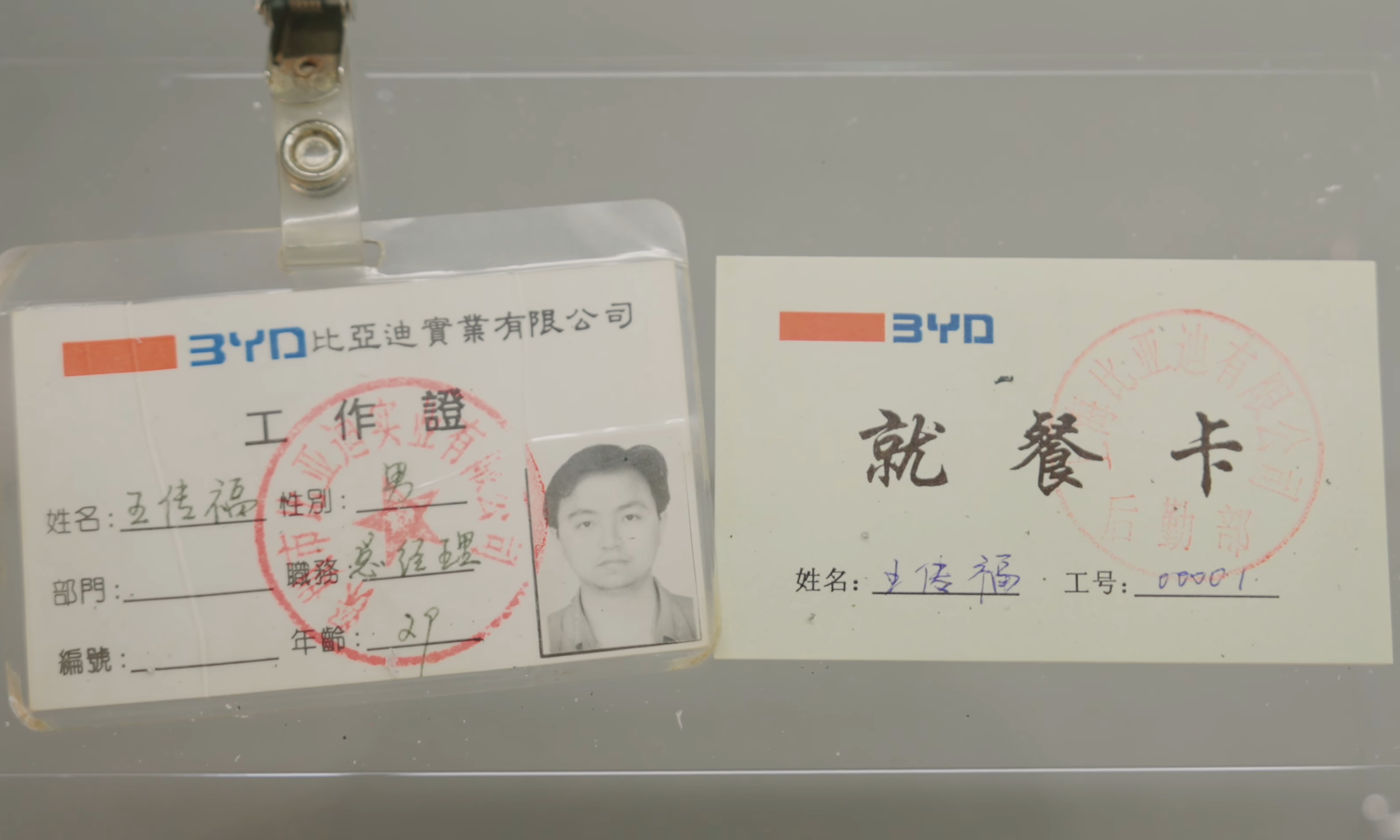
BYD's first employee card issued to Wang Chuanfu in 1995, with the employee number 00001

In 1993, the Beijing Non-Ferrous Metal General Research Institute established a battery company called BAK Battery Co., Ltd. in Shenzhen. Given Wang's academic background in related research fields, he was appointed as the general manager. During his tenure, he gained experience in business management and battery manufacturing.

Seeing a market opportunity in mobile phones and anticipating industry shifts as Japan phased out nickel-cadmium batteries, Wang Chuanfu chose to leave BAK Battery in 1995 and founded his own company, BYD Company, outside of Shenzhen. At 29 years old, he founded the company with his cousin Lu Xiangyang, who lent him CN¥250,000.

In September 2008, Warren Buffett's Berkshire Hathaway Inc through MidAmerican Energy Holdings, invested about US$230 million for a 9.89% share of BYD at HK$8/share. Buffett credited this investment to Charlie Munger, Berkshire's vice chairman who saw the potential in the company. Munger credited Li Lu, founder of Seattle-based asset manager Himalaya Capital, for introducing him to BYD and Wang. Munger spoke admiringly of Wang, saying that he came from a poor family but rose through hard work and talent. Munger also called Wang a "genius" and a "workaholic".

In early 2009, he was reportedly worth US$3.4 billion, placing him 408th on Hurun Report's Global Rich List 2014. In late 2009, his net worth grew to $5.1 billion and was crowned China's richest man on the Hurun Report. This was due largely to a five-fold increase in his company's value after Berkshire Hathaway bought 225 million new shares of BYD in 2008.

In 2008, Wang Chuanfu set a goal for BYD to become the leader in the Chinese automotive market by 2015, and to become the largest car manufacturer globally by 2025. He stated that electric vehicles would serve as BYD's "stepping stone" to skip the development of internal combustion engine vehicles and facilitate the company's entry into international markets.

Around 2017 and 2019, BYD was heavily impacted by a reduction in electric vehicle government subsidies. This led to a significant slowdown in sales volume and market share, with sharp decline in net profit over three consecutive years. Wang recalled that this was the company's "darkest moment", and at that time, the company's primary goal was merely "to survive".

In November 2021, Forbes reported that Wang's wealth had increased to $23.5 billion, making him the 14th richest person in China; this was due to a two-fold increase in BYD's share price over the previous year.

Wang claims to spend 60-70% of his time on technology and product development. He often implements minor design changes to bypass existing patents. He once remarked that patents are static, stating, "In developing a new product, 60% comes from existing literature, 30% from sample analysis, and another 5% from raw materials and other external factors. Our own original research accounts for only about 5%." In June 2026, Wang told investors at BYD’s annual shareholder meeting that the automaker aims to become the world’s No. 1 automaker within five years.

== Politics ==
Wang Chuanfu is a member of the Chinese Communist Party (CCP).

In February 2025, Wang was among tech sector leaders to meet with General Secretary of the CCP Xi Jinping at the Great Hall of the People. Along with Ren Zhengfei, Wang sat directly in front of Xi, in seats honoring their respective company's contributions as national champions.

== Personal life ==
Wang is married and lives in Shenzhen.
