= Wuwei, Anhui =

Wuwei 无为市
- County-level city
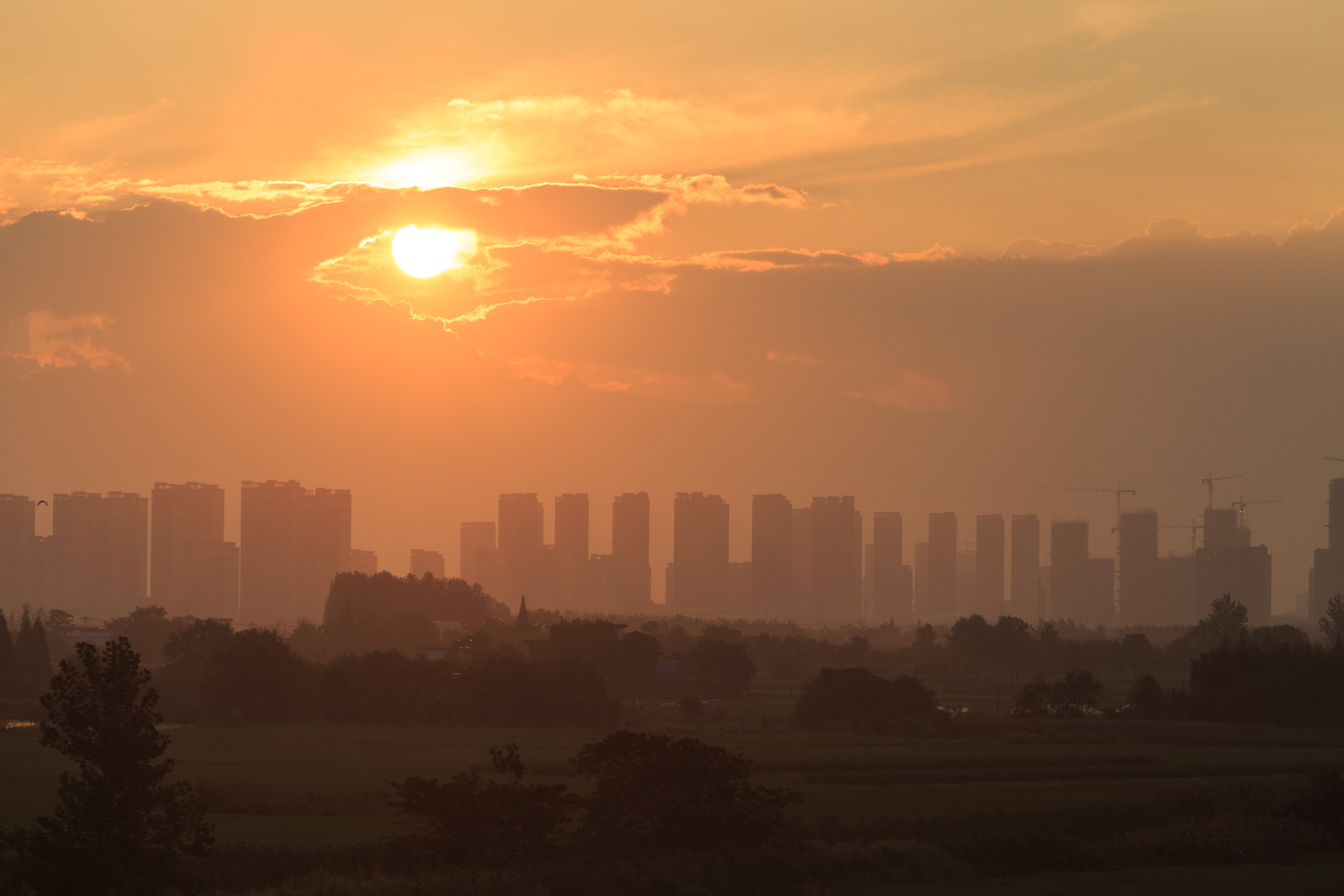
- Sunset in Wuwei, view from Hefei–Fuzhou High-Speed Railway

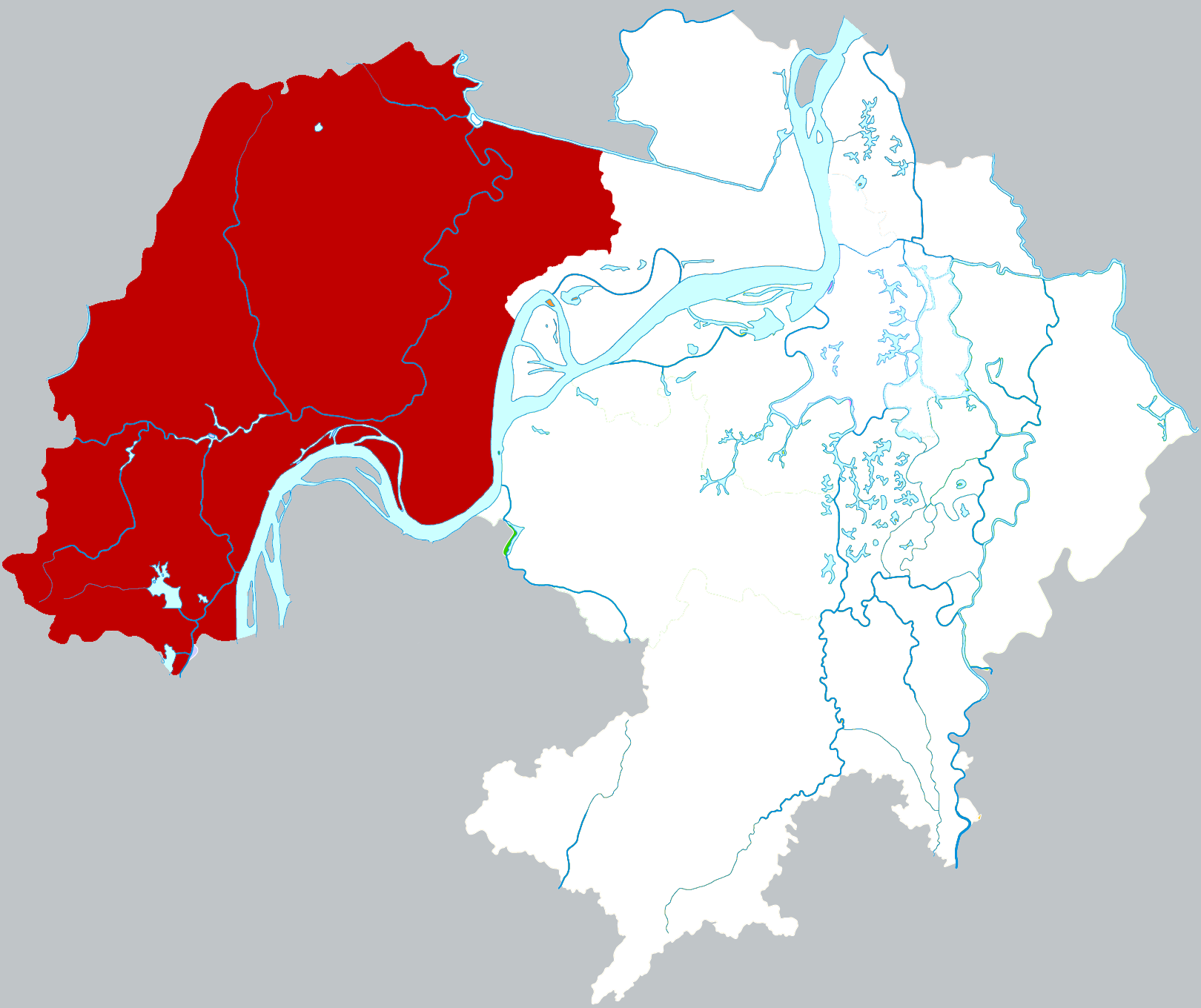
- Wuwei in Wuhu

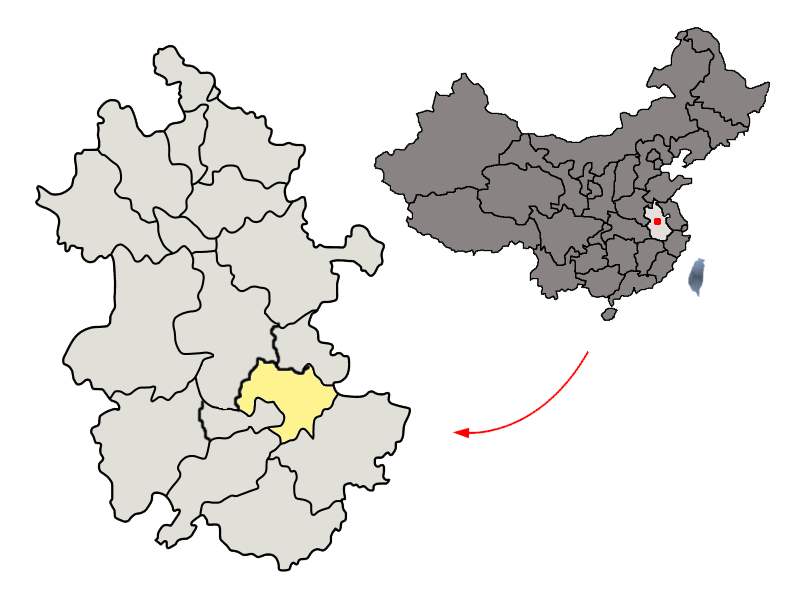
- Wuhu in Anhui
- Coordinates (Wuwei municipal government): 31°18′16″N 117°54′08″E
- Country: China
- Province: Anhui
- Prefecture-level city: Wuhu
- Municipal seat: Wucheng (无城镇)

Area
  - Total: 2,022 km^{2} (781 sq mi)

Population (2020)
  - Total: 817,997
  - Density: 404.5/km^{2} (1,048/sq mi)
- Time zone: UTC+8 (China Standard)
- Postal code: 238300
- Area code: 0553
- Website: www.ww.gov.cn

Wuwei, Anhui
- Traditional Chinese: 無為
- Simplified Chinese: 无为
Transcriptions
Standard Mandarin
- Hanyu Pinyin: Wúwéi
- IPA: [ǔ.wěɪ]
Wu
- Romanization: 3vu-hhue
Yue: Cantonese
- Jyutping: mou4-wai4
- IPA: [mɔw˩.wɐj˩]

Wuwei (simplified Chinese: 无为; traditional Chinese: 無為; pinyin: Wúwéi) is a county-level city in the southeast of Anhui Province, China, under the jurisdiction of the prefecture-level city of Wuhu. Previously a county, Wuwei was upgraded to a county-level city in late 2019.

It has population of 1,214,000 as of 2018, and an area of 2,022 square kilometres (781 sq mi). The government of Wuwei City is located in the town of Wucheng.

== Administrative divisions ==
Wuwei directly administers the following 20 towns:

- Wucheng (无城镇)
- Xiang'an (襄安镇)
- Dougou (陡沟镇 (无为县))
- Shijian (石涧镇 (无为县))
- Yanqiao (严桥镇 (无为市))
- Kaicheng (开城镇 (无为市))
- Shushan (蜀山镇)
- Niubu (牛埠镇)
- Liudu (刘渡镇)
- Yaogou (姚沟镇)
- Nicha (泥汊镇)
- Fudu (福渡镇)
- Quantang (泉塘镇 (无为市))
- Hedian (赫店镇)
- Hongmiao (红庙镇 (无为县))
- Gaogou (高沟镇 (无为县))
- Hemao (鹤毛镇)
- Shilidun (十里墩镇)
- Kunshan (昆山镇)
- Hongxiang (洪巷镇)

== Climate ==
Climate data for Wuwei, elevation 10 m (33 ft), (1991–2020 normals, extremes 1981–present)
Month	Jan	Feb	Mar	Apr	May	Jun	Jul	Aug	Sep	Oct	Nov	Dec	Year
Record high °C (°F)	22.8 (73.0)	27.7 (81.9)	33.0 (91.4)	33.0 (91.4)	35.7 (96.3)	37.5 (99.5)	39.3 (102.7)	39.5 (103.1)	37.5 (99.5)	33.6 (92.5)	28.7 (83.7)	22.6 (72.7)	39.5 (103.1)
Mean daily maximum °C (°F)	7.5 (45.5)	10.3 (50.5)	15.3 (59.5)	21.8 (71.2)	26.9 (80.4)	29.5 (85.1)	32.8 (91.0)	32.3 (90.1)	28.2 (82.8)	23.0 (73.4)	16.7 (62.1)	10.1 (50.2)	21.2 (70.2)
Daily mean °C (°F)	3.5 (38.3)	6.1 (43.0)	10.6 (51.1)	16.8 (62.2)	22.1 (71.8)	25.4 (77.7)	28.8 (83.8)	28.1 (82.6)	23.8 (74.8)	18.1 (64.6)	11.8 (53.2)	5.6 (42.1)	16.7 (62.1)
Mean daily minimum °C (°F)	0.6 (33.1)	2.8 (37.0)	6.9 (44.4)	12.5 (54.5)	17.9 (64.2)	22.0 (71.6)	25.5 (77.9)	25.0 (77.0)	20.4 (68.7)	14.4 (57.9)	8.1 (46.6)	2.3 (36.1)	13.2 (55.8)
Record low °C (°F)	−8.1 (17.4)	−9.6 (14.7)	−3.3 (26.1)	2.6 (36.7)	8.8 (47.8)	13.6 (56.5)	19.0 (66.2)	16.4 (61.5)	11.7 (53.1)	3.8 (38.8)	−4.7 (23.5)	−11.6 (11.1)	−11.6 (11.1)
Average precipitation mm (inches)	61.0 (2.40)	68.1 (2.68)	102.8 (4.05)	102.6 (4.04)	114.4 (4.50)	212.6 (8.37)	200.2 (7.88)	142.4 (5.61)	76.8 (3.02)	55.3 (2.18)	59.2 (2.33)	40.9 (1.61)	1,236.3 (48.67)
Average precipitation days (≥ 0.1 mm)	10.5	10.3	11.8	10.5	11.2	12.0	11.2	11.7	8.5	7.6	8.7	7.4	121.4
Average snowy days	3.8	1.9	0.6	0	0	0	0	0	0	0	0.3	1.2	7.8
Average relative humidity (%)	78	77	75	74	74	79	80	81	80	77	77	75	77
Mean monthly sunshine hours	101.2	105.0	133.3	158.7	170.1	139.0	188.4	178.3	146.1	145.1	126.8	118.9	1,710.9
Percentage possible sunshine	31	33	36	41	40	33	44	44	40	42	40	38	39
Source: China Meteorological Administration all-time January high

== Urbanization ==
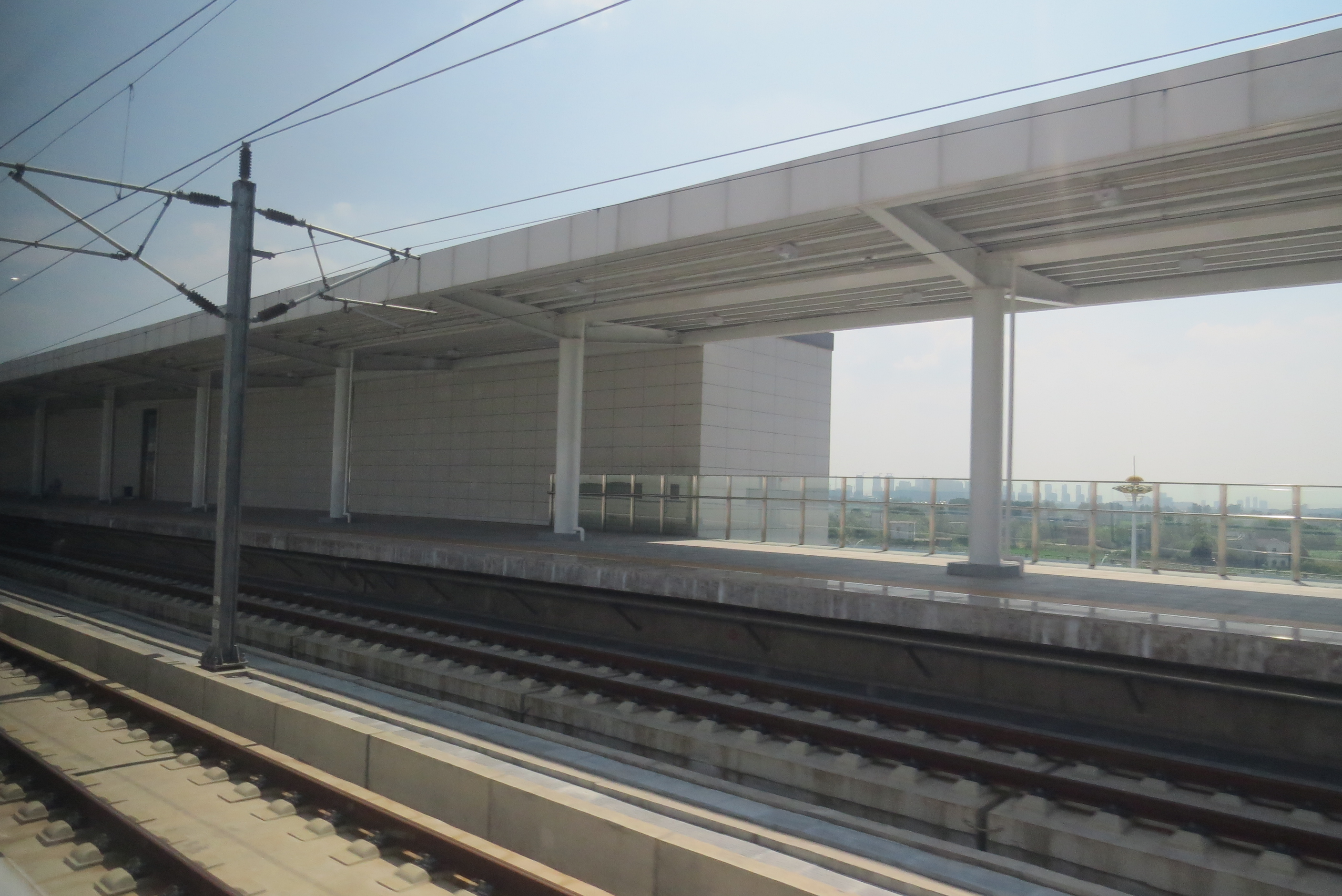
Wuwei Railway Station on Hefei–Fuzhou High-Speed Railway.

On December 16, 2019, the State Council approved re-designating Wuwei from a county to a county-level city, due to the area's increasing urbanization. Eight months later, The Economist commented on the urbanization, describing that "at the heart of Wuwei, high-rise housing and a glossy white shopping centre sit next to dilapidated alleys where farmers sell live chickens".

== Economy ==
In 2018, the city recorded a GDP of 438.2 billion yuan, and retail sales totaling 129.5 billion yuan.

== Notable people ==
- Wang Chuanfu, founder of BYD
- Chen Shiping (Tom Shiping Chen), founder of Chen2.com Education Technology Limited
