= BYD Company =

Chinese manufacturing company

BYD Company Limited
- Logo used since 2022

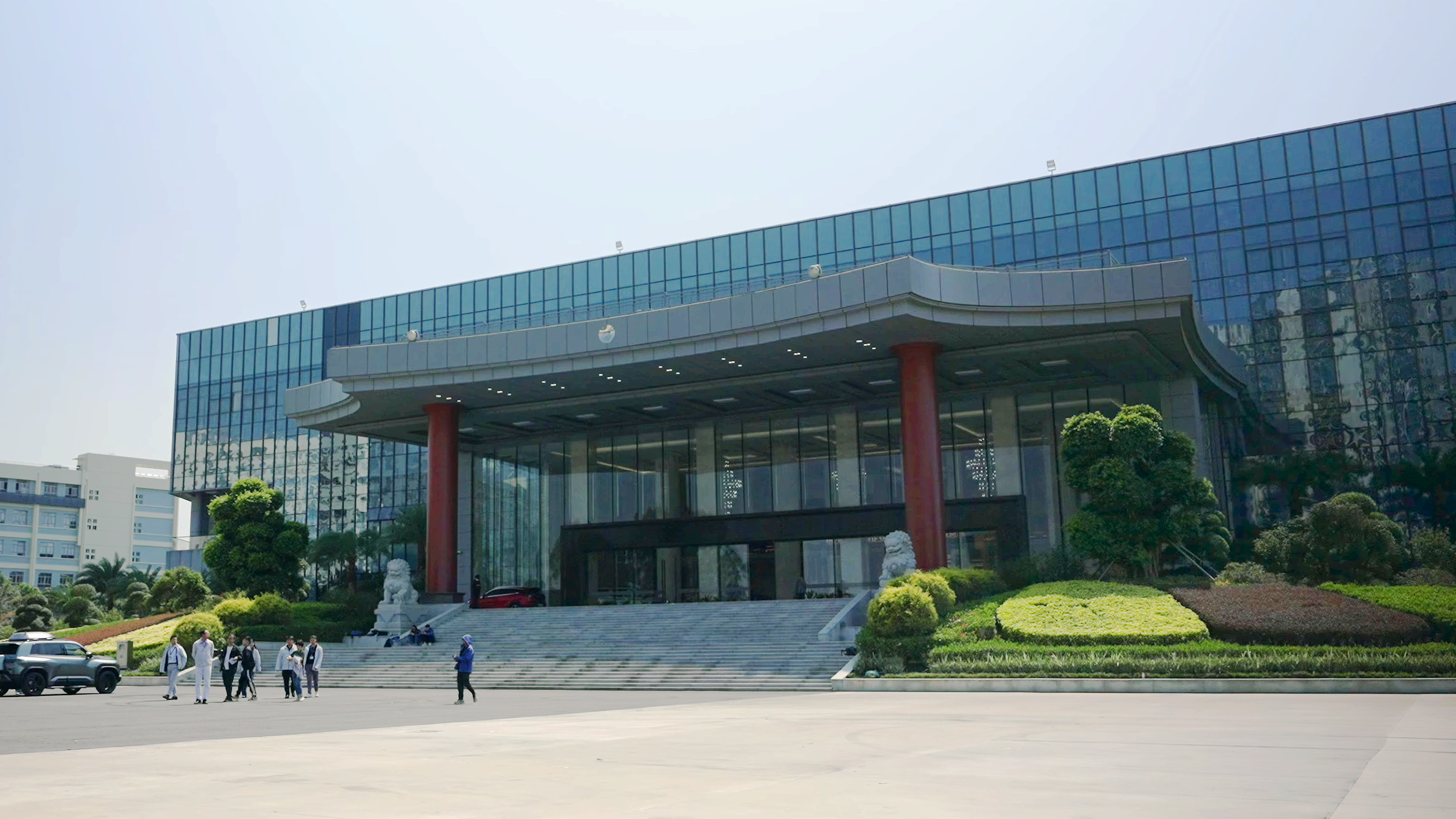
- Headquarters in Pingshan District, Shenzhen, Guangdong, China
- Formerly: Shenzhen BYD Battery Company Limited (1995–2002)
- Type: Public
- Traded as: SEHK: 1211; SZSE: 002594; CSI A50 component (002594); Hang Seng Index component (1211)
- Industry: Conglomerate
- Founded: 10 February 1995; 31 years ago
- Founder: Wang Chuanfu; Lu Xiangyang
- Headquarters: Shenzhen, Guangdong, China
- Area served: Worldwide
- Key people: Wang Chuanfu (chairman & CEO); Stella Li (Executive Vice President); Wolfgang Egger (Chief Design Officer)
- Products: Automobiles; automotive components; forklifts; rechargeable batteries; photovoltaic systems; handsets; handset components; semiconductors; monorail systems and cars
- Production output: ▲4.60 million vehicles (2025); ▲155.7 GWh electric vehicle batteries (2024)
- Revenue: ▼¥804 billion (2025) (US$120.02 billion)
- Operating income: ▲¥38.1 billion (2024) (US$5.29 billion)
- Net income: ▼¥32.6 billion (2025) (US$4.87 billion)
- Total assets: ▲¥883.7 billion (2025) (US$131.92 billion)
- Total equity: ▲CN¥185 billion US$25.771 billion (2024)
- Owners: Wang Chuanfu (16.9%); Lu Xiangyang (13.0%); Youngy Investment (5.1%); Xia Zuoquan (2.7%)
- Number of employees: ▼869,600 (December 2025)
- Subsidiaries: BYD Auto; BYD Electronics (65.76%); BYD Semiconductor; BYD Transit Solutions; FinDreams
- Website: bydglobal.com

BYD Company
- Simplified Chinese: 比亚迪股份有限公司
- Traditional Chinese: 比亞迪股份有限公司
Transcriptions
Standard Mandarin
- Hanyu Pinyin: Bǐyàdí Gǔfēn Yǒuxiàn Gōngsī
Yue: Cantonese
- Jyutping: bei2 aa3 dik6 gu2 fan6*2 jau5 haan6 gung1 si1

BYD Company Limited or BYD (Chinese: 比亚迪; pinyin: Bǐyàdí) is a Chinese multinational manufacturing conglomerate headquartered in Shenzhen, Guangdong, China. It is a vertically integrated company with several major subsidiaries, including BYD Auto which produces automobiles, BYD Electronics which produces electronic parts and assembly, and FinDreams, a brand name of multiple companies that produce automotive components and electric vehicle batteries.

BYD was founded by Wang Chuanfu in February 1995 as a battery manufacturing company. Its largest subsidiary, BYD Auto, was established in 2003 and has since become the world's largest manufacturer of plug-in electric vehicles. Since 2009, BYD's automotive business has accounted for over 50% of its revenue, surpassing 80% by 2023. The company also produces rechargeable batteries (including handset batteries, electric vehicle batteries, and energy storage systems), forklifts, solar panels, semiconductors, and rail transit systems. Through its subsidiary, FinDreams Battery, BYD was the world's second-largest electric vehicle battery producer in 2024, holding a 17% market share, behind CATL.

Since 2022, BYD has been China's largest private-sector employer, ranking behind several state-owned enterprises. As of September 2024, the company employs 900,608 people, including 104,003 in research and development (R&D). It also leads in patent filings, having submitted over 13,000 patents between 2003 and 2023. In 2024, the World Intellectual Property Organization (WIPO)’s Madrid Yearly Review ranked BYD's number of marks applications filled under the Madrid System as 10th in the world, with 73 trademarks applications submitted during 2024. BYD's stock is listed on the Hong Kong Stock Exchange (H shares) and the Shenzhen Stock Exchange (A shares). The company ranked 143rd on the Fortune Global 500 in 2024.

== Name ==
BYD signs and logos

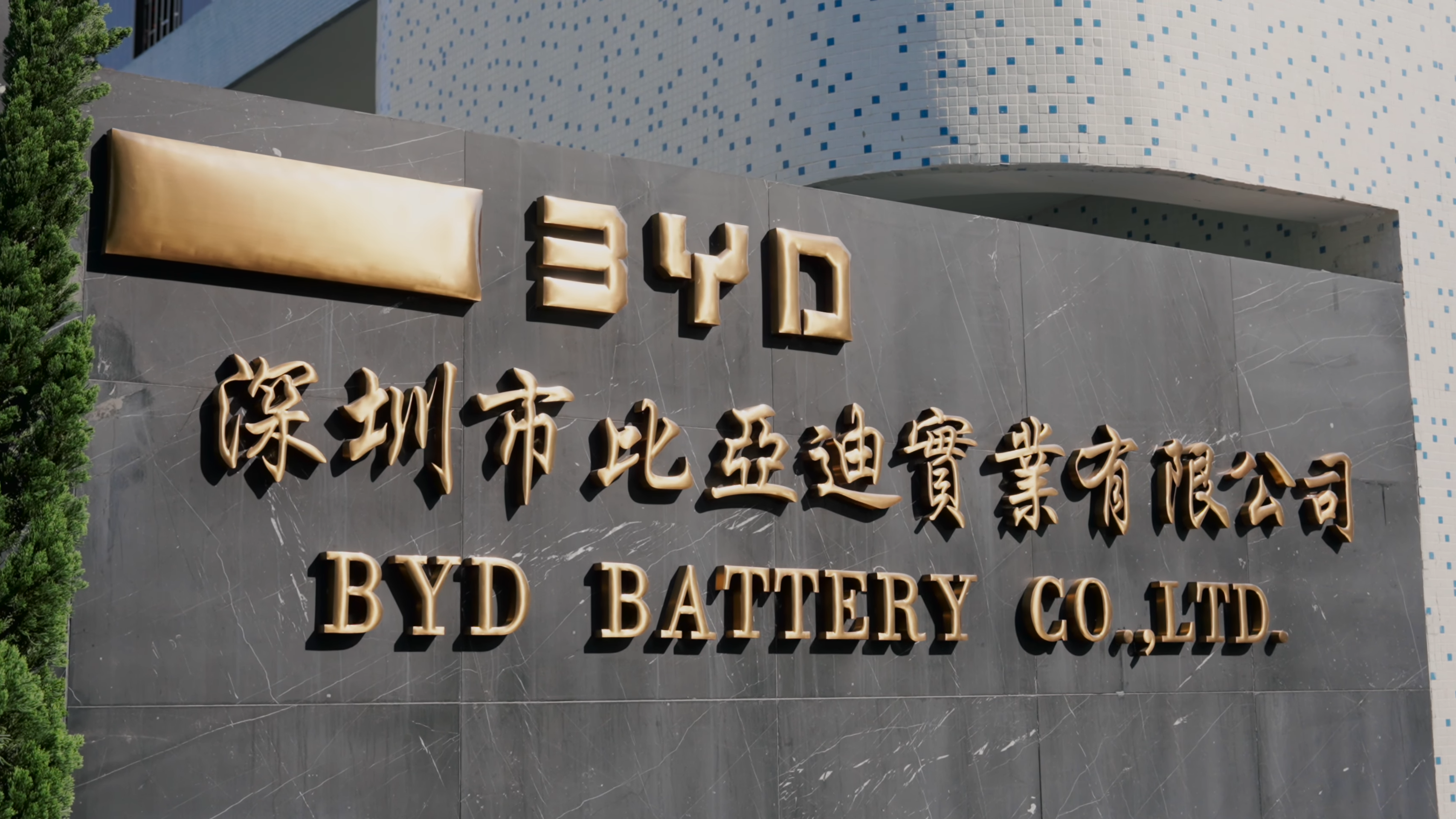
An original BYD sign, initially named BYD Battery Co., Ltd.

Logo until 2022

"BYD" is the pinyin initials of the company's Chinese name Biyadi. The company was originally known as Yadi Electronics (亚迪电子), named after the Yadi Road in Dapeng New District, where the company was once based. According to Wang Chuanfu, when the company was registered, the character "Bi" (比) was added to the name to prevent duplication, and to provide the company with an alphabetical advantage in trade shows. As the name "BYD" had no particular meaning, BYD started adopting a backronymic slogan "Build Your Dreams" when it participated at the 2008 North American International Auto Show in the US.

== History ==
=== Early years ===
On 18 November 1994, Wang Chuanfu gathered a team of 20 people and founded BYD in Buji Town, Longgang District, Shenzhen. The company was formally founded on 10 February 1995 as Shenzhen BYD Battery Company Limited with CN¥ 2.5 million of capital, with a focus on producing rechargeable nickel–cadmium (NiCd) batteries. Wang founded the company after noticing an opportunity presented by the shift in Japanese companies from NiCd to high-value nickel–metal hydride (NiMH) and lithium-ion (Li-ion) batteries while he was working as a vice supervisor at the Beijing Nonferrous Research Institute. He moved to Shenzhen with his cousin Lu Xiangyang and started the company in 1995 to capitalize on the opportunity.

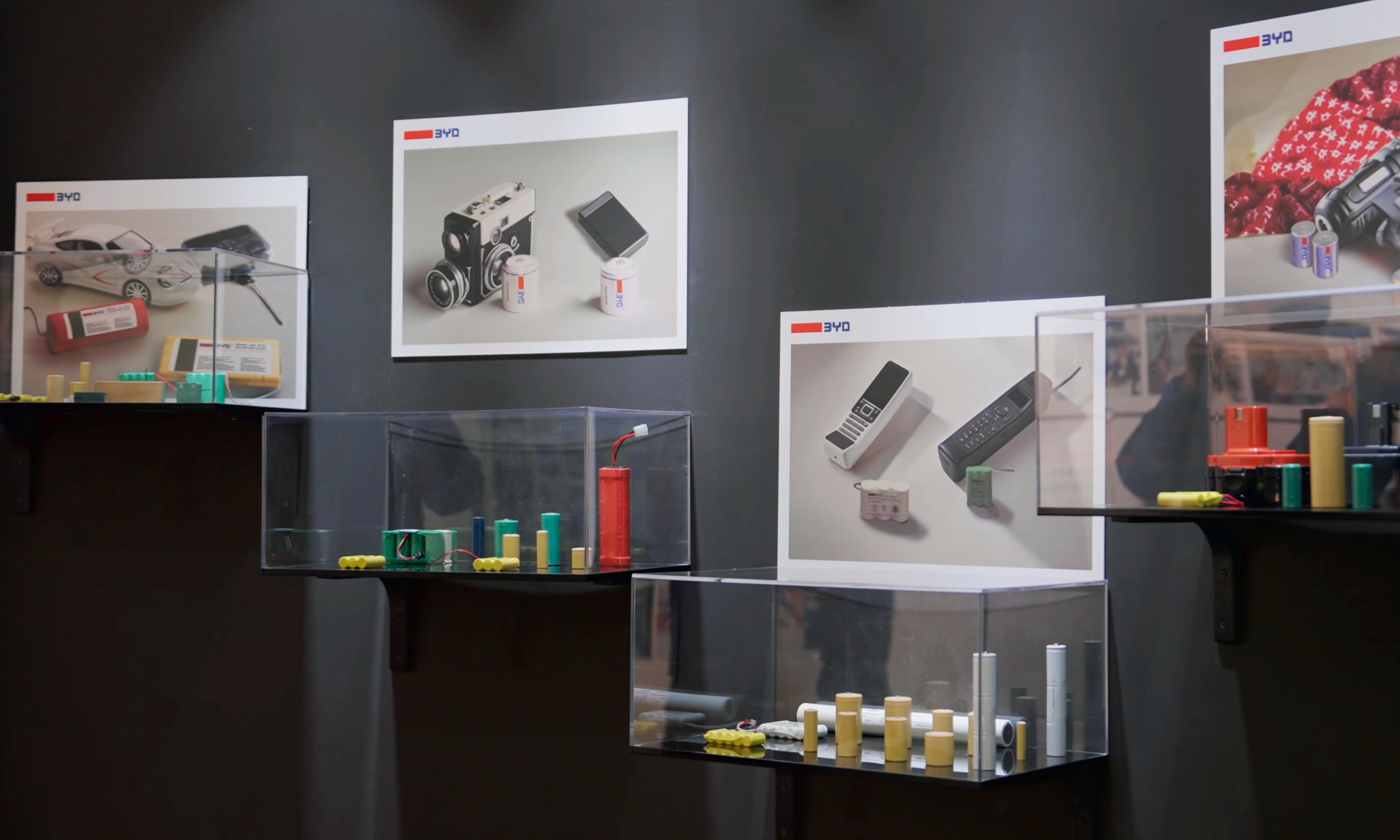
BYD Battery early product portfolio, showcased at the BYD Museum in Shenzhen

BYD's business grew by implementing a redesigned manufacturing approach by incorporating more manual labour, in contrast of the capital-intensive and highly automated processes in Japan. This manufacturing process, along with in-house production of key machinery, contributed to a reduction in unit costs compared to Japanese competitors by around five or six times lower. The company also developed advancements in battery technology, including foamed nickel roller welding, which improved electrode performance.

BYD's cost-efficient production methods attracted major clients. In 1996, BYD secured an order from Sanyo, marking its entry into the global battery supply chain. By 1997, amid the Asian financial crisis, Philips, Panasonic, and Motorola became BYD's major clients.

In 1998, BYD's first branch outside China, BYD Europe B.V., was opened in the Netherlands. It also established a branch in the United States called BYD America Corporation in 1999. BYD opened its first industrial park in Kuichong, Shenzhen in 2000.

BYD started producing mobile phone components in the early 2000s. By July 2002, BYD became the world's leading NiCd battery manufacturer, surpassing Sanyo, accounting for 65% of global production.

In September 2002, Sanyo filed a patent infringement lawsuit against BYD, alleging that BYD infringed on its patents related to the constitution of the bare cell of Li-ion batteries and the structure of Li-ion battery packs.

In 2007, Taiwanese electronics manufacturer Foxconn sued BYD for unfair competition and misappropriating confidential data. Lawsuits were filed in Hong Kong and Shenzhen, alleging BYD obtained trade secrets from former Foxconn employees. Previously, BYD had faced unsuccessful patent infringement claims from Sony and Sanyo.

In December 2007, the BYD Electronics division is listed on the Hong Kong Stock Exchange after multiple delays due to legal disputes with Foxconn.

=== Entry to automotive industry ===
On 31 July 2002, the company underwent an initial public offering (IPO) on the Hong Kong Stock Exchange. The company announced its target to become the world's second-largest battery firm. Shortly after the IPO, BYD acquired a small automotive manufacturing company, Xi'an Qinchuan Automobile, from state-owned defense company Norinco in January 2003, which was met with disapproval from shareholders, as the plan was not disclosed in the prospectus. Qinchuan was acquired with the intention of developing battery-powered electric vehicles. BYD's first cars were conventional petrol vehicles such as the BYD F3, with production starting in April 2005. The model gained market share by offering a low price and was considered successful.

The company produced its first plug-in hybrid vehicle, the BYD F3 DM in 2008, followed by its first production battery electric vehicle, the BYD e6 in 2009.

For eleven years, from 2009 to 2020, BYD's automobile business stagnated, with annual sales hovering between 400,000 and 500,000 vehicles, while other local manufacturers experienced growth. From 2020, BYD's sales have grown significantly, driven in part by the rapid increase in new energy vehicle sales in China. Since 2021, it started exporting passenger cars to key markets such as Europe, Latin America, Southeast Asia and Australia.

=== Berkshire Hathaway investment ===
In September 2008, MidAmerican Energy Holdings, a subsidiary of Warren Buffett's Berkshire Hathaway Inc, invested about US$230 million for a 9.89% share of BYD at HK$8 per share. Buffett credited this investment to Charlie Munger, Berkshire's vice chairman who saw the potential in the company. Since 2022, Berkshire had gradually reduced its shareholding in BYD after its share price increased significantly. As of June 2024, Berkshire held a 6.9% stake in BYD. By September 2025, Berkshire had completely exited its investment in BYD.

In 2009, BYD purchased a Chinese solar panel manufacturer to enter the solar panel industry. It began building a 100-megawatt solar power plant in Shangluo, Shaanxi, at a cost of CN¥ 500 million.

By 2009, the company secured its position as the second-largest producer of NiMH batteries and the third-largest in Li-ion batteries. In 2012, BYD had captured more than half the world's mobile phone battery market and was the largest Chinese manufacturer (and in the top four globally) of all types of rechargeable batteries.

In June 2011, BYD was listed on the Shenzhen Stock Exchange at CN¥ 18 a share. It raised CN¥ 1.42 billion yuan (US$219 million) in the initial public offering, which was below expectations, amid weak investor sentiment and concerns over its performance.

In 2016, BYD unveiled a working monorail prototype marketed as "Skyrail" (Chinese: 云轨; lit. 'cloud rail') and announced they will enter the global rail transit market. The first public Skyrail line opened as a 9.7 km (6.0 mi) long loop line in Yinchuan's flower expo in 2018.

Between 2017 and 2019, due to several factors such as the slowdown of BYD Auto's sales, BYD saw its net profit has falling sharply for three consecutive years, especially in 2019 when it dropped to CN¥ 1.6 billion. Wang Chuanfu described it as the "darkest moment", since at that time the company had only one goal, which was to survive. However, Wang insisted on investing CN¥ 8.4 billion in research and development. In 2020, BYD received the equivalent of €2.1 billion in Chinese state subsidies.

=== Recent performance ===
In 2020, BYD established four automotive component manufacturers spun off from BYD divisions under the FinDreams brand, with the intention of supplying parts to other automotive companies. That same year, it introduced the Blade battery, a lithium iron phosphate (LFP) battery for electric vehicles. While many battery manufacturers were shifting away from LFP due to concerns over energy density, BYD promoted the Blade as a safer alternative with competitive energy performance and energy density. The battery was first used in the BYD Han, a battery electric sedan released in 2020, and later adopted in subsequent models.

From 2020, BYD experienced a substantial surge in vehicle production and sales volume, partly attributed to the increasing popularity of new energy vehicles in China. It also initiated exports of electric vehicles to overseas markets from 2021, mainly to Europe, Southeast Asia, Oceania, and Latin America. In March 2022, BYD ended the production of pure internal combustion engine vehicles to focus on plug-in electric vehicles. In 2023, it introduced two new brands: Yangwang and Fangchengbao.

In 2024, BYD opened its first joint venture outside of China, an electric vehicle factory in Uzbekistan.

In November 2024, BYD hosted an event in Shenzhen to commemorate its 30th anniversary and the production of its 10 millionth new energy vehicle.

In the second quarter of 2025, BYD's quarterly profit fell for the first time in more than three years, with net profit totalling 6.4 billion yuan ($894.74 million), down 29.9% from the same period in 2024, as vehicle sales declined in its home market. Reuters reported that the Chinese government's campaign against price wars contributed to the slowdown in BYD's sales. In September 2025, Berkshire Hathaway sold its entire stake in BYD after a 17-year investment that generated a 3,890% return, having begun gradually reducing its position in 2022.

In the first quarter of 2026, BYD reported a net profit attributable to shareholders of 4.09 billion yuan ($594 million), a decline of 55.4% year-on-year, while revenue fell 11.8% to 150.23 billion yuan. Total vehicle sales for the quarter were down 30% year-on-year. Several factors contributed to the decline, including the partial withdrawal of national purchase tax exemptions for new energy vehicles at the start of 2026, as well as intensified domestic price competition. Overseas sales partly offset the domestic weakness, with deliveries reaching 321,165 units in the first quarter of 2026, an increase of 55.8% year-on-year, accounting for approximately 46% of total BYD vehicle sales for the period. BYD subsequently raised its full-year 2026 overseas sales target to 1.5 million units.

== Subsidiaries and businesses ==
=== BYD Auto ===
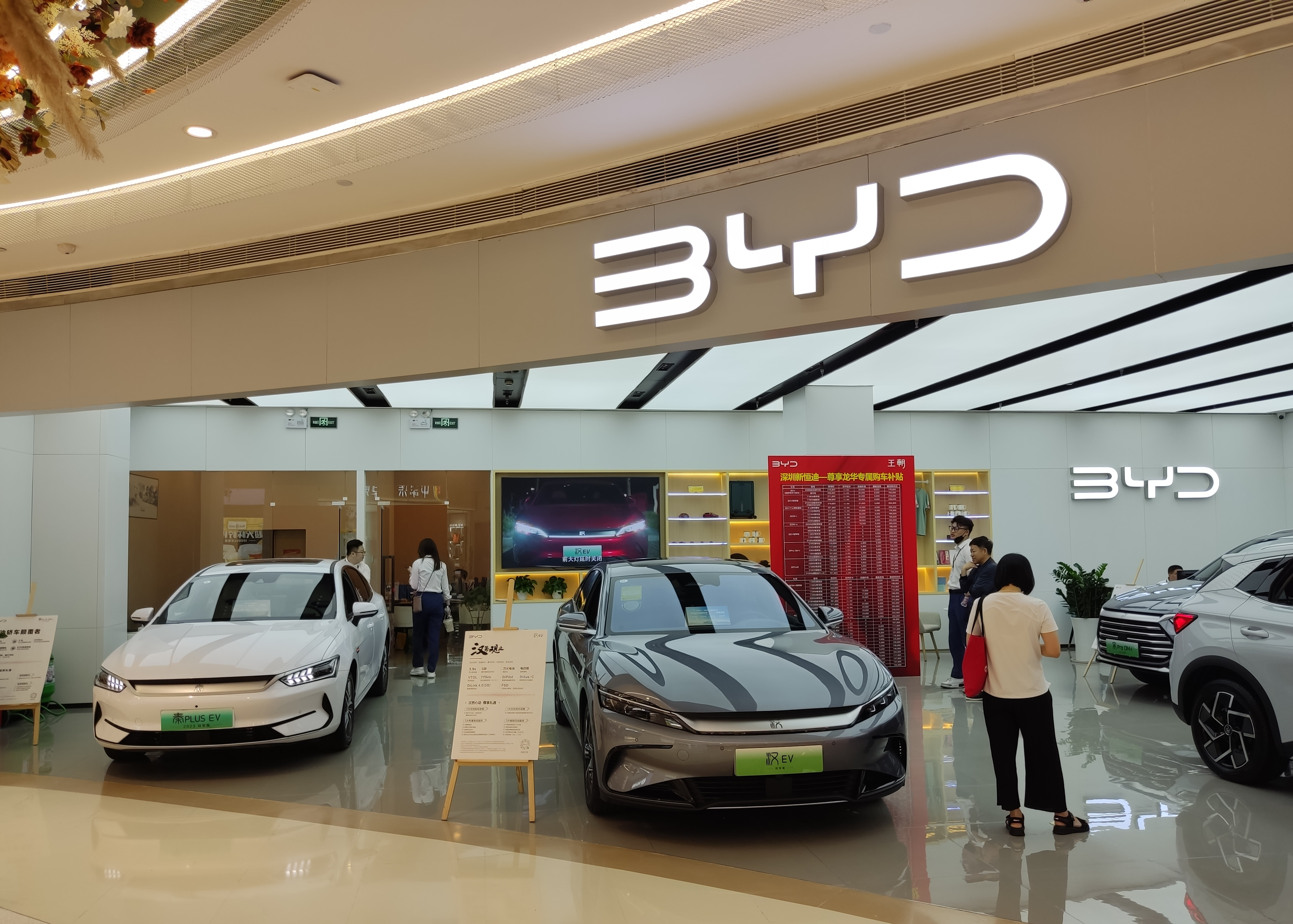
A BYD car showroom in a shopping mall in Shenzhen

BYD Auto was founded in January 2003 by BYD owner Wang Chuanfu, following BYD's acquisition of Xi'an Qinchuan Automobile. It manufactures passenger battery electric vehicles (BEVs) and plug-in hybrid electric vehicles (PHEVs), collectively known as new energy vehicles (NEVs) in China. It also produces electric buses and trucks. Aside from using the BYD main brand, BYD Auto also owns three other brands intended to capture the high-end market, which are Denza, Fangchengbao and Yangwang.

The BYD F3, the first car developed by BYD Auto, began production in 2005. The company launched its first plug-in hybrid electric vehicle, the BYD F3DM in 2008, followed by the BYD e6, its first battery electric vehicle, in 2009. BYD Auto ended production of purely internal combustion engined cars in March 2022. Since 2023, BYD Auto is the largest automobile manufacturer in China by annual sales.

As of 2025, BYD Auto has nine major vehicle production bases in China. In addition, it operates production bases in Uzbekistan and Thailand and is constructing new facilities in Indonesia, Brazil, Hungary, and Turkey. BYD's annual vehicle production capacity in China is 5.82 million vehicles as of 2024.

BYD's automotive business constitutes the majority of BYD's revenue. In 2024, BYD reported a revenue of around CN¥617 billion from automotive and related products, accounting for 79% of BYD's total revenue.

=== BYD Electronics ===
BYD Electronic (International) Company Limited
- Type: Public (subsidiary)
- Traded as: SEHK: 285
- Industry: Electronics; Consumer electronics
- Founded: 14 June 2007; 19 years ago
- Headquarters: Shenzhen, Guangdong, China
- Area served: Worldwide
- Key people: Wang Nianqiang; Jiang Xiangrong (executive directors); Wang Chuanfu
- Products: Handsets; Handset components
- Revenue: ▲CN¥129.95 billion (2023)
- Operating income: ▲CN¥7.96 billion (2023)
- Net income: ▲CN¥4.04 billion (2023)
- Total assets: ▲CN¥87.21 billion (2023)
- Total equity: ▲CN¥29.33 billion (2023)
- Owners: BYD Company Limited (65.76%); Wang Chuanfu (17.81%)
- Number of employees: ▲150,300 (2023)
- Parent: BYD Company Limited
- Website: electronics.byd.com

BYD Electronic (International) Company Limited or simply BYD Electronics manufactures handset components and assembles mobile phones for its customers as an OEM or ODM. Created as a subsidiary of BYD in 2002, it issued an IPO on the Hong Kong Stock Exchange in 2007 having been incorporated in Hong Kong on 14 June 2007.

BYD Electronics operated several overseas factories, such as in Cluj, Romania; a factory in Komárom, Hungary that was acquired through the February 2008 purchase of Mirae Hungary Industrial Manufacturer Ltd; and a factory in Chennai, India, which was also completed in 2008. In addition, BYD Electronic has production bases in Huizhou, Tianjin, and at Baolong Industrial Park, Longgang District, Shenzhen.

As a "one-site mode supplier" especially for mobile phones, the company provides product design, manufacturing, testing, assembly and after sales services. By 2011, notable BYD Electronics customers include Nokia, Motorola, and Samsung. According to Wang Chuanfu in 2021, the company manufactures most Huawei mobile phones.

Since 2020, BYD Electronics became one of the original equipment manufacturer (OEM) of Apple's iPad. It also produces iPads in its factory in Vietnam, which went operational in July 2022. The Vietnamese factory is located at the Phu Ha industrial park in the Phú Thọ province. The first phase of the facility has an annual capacity of 4.32 million tablets and 50 million optical prism products. Apple's plan to produce iPads with BYD in India were cancelled due to government regulations stemming from geopolitical concerns between India and China.

In August 2023, BYD Electronics has agreed to buy several Chinese factories operated by Jabil, a U.S. manufacturer that supplies major components to Apple.

In May 2024, it was announced that BYD Electronics would be added to Hong Kong's Hang Seng Index.

In July 2024, BYD Electronics and Luxshare Precision joined the iPhone 16 supply chain, following the relocation of some iPhone production from India back to China due to quality concerns.

BYD Electronics product portfolio

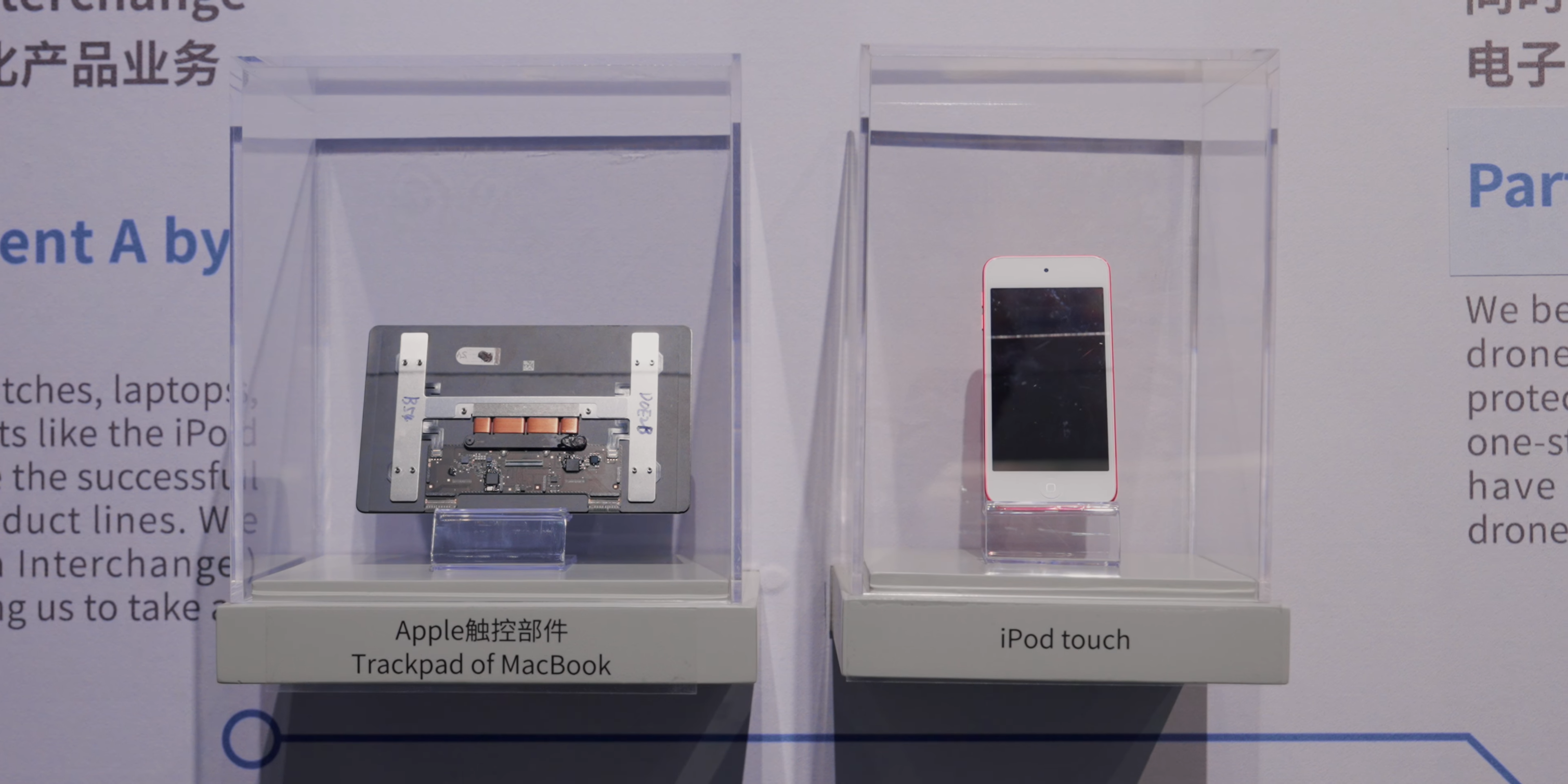
MacBook trackpad and iPod touch

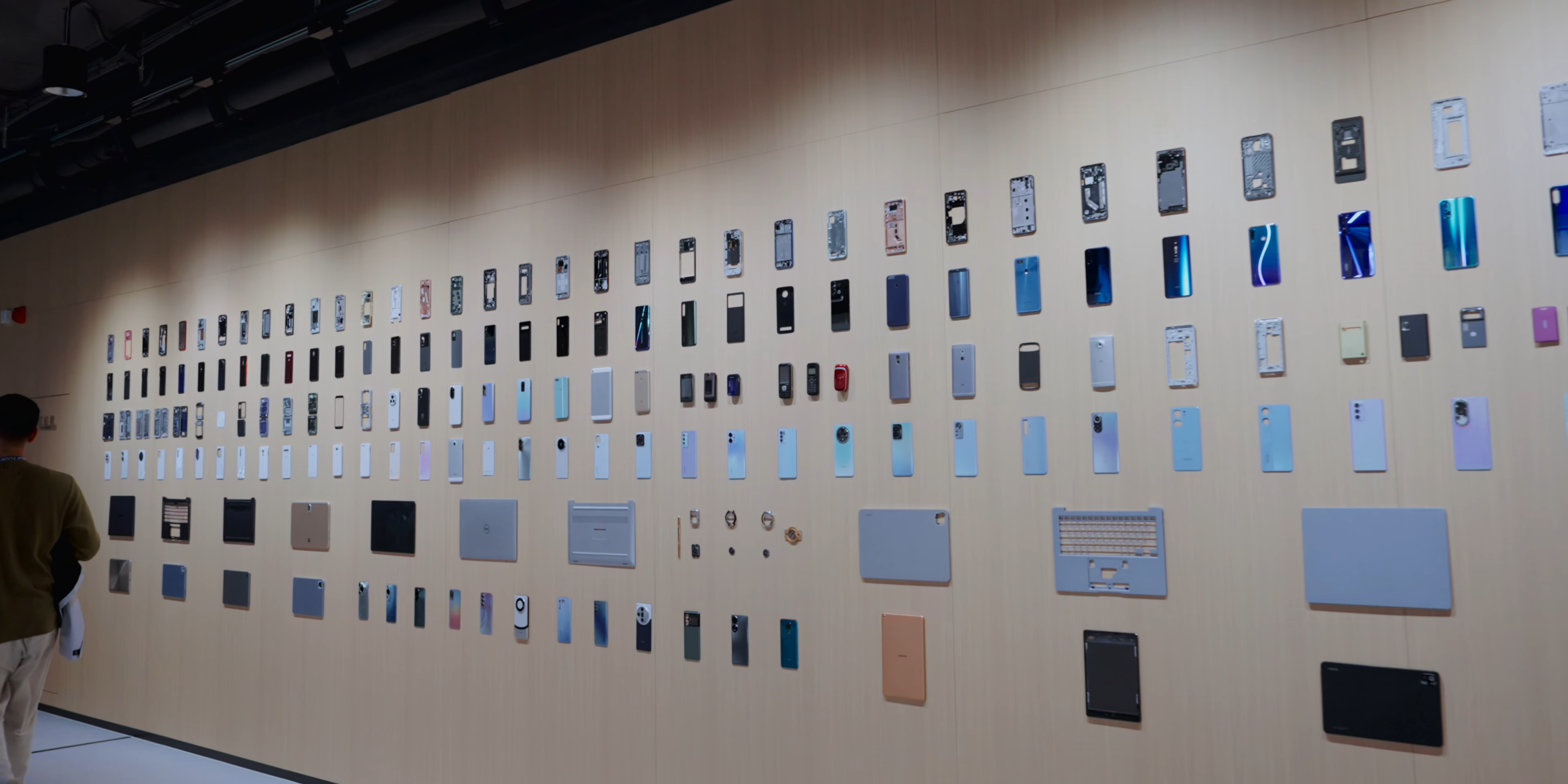
Casings of various handsets, including smartphones, tablets and laptops

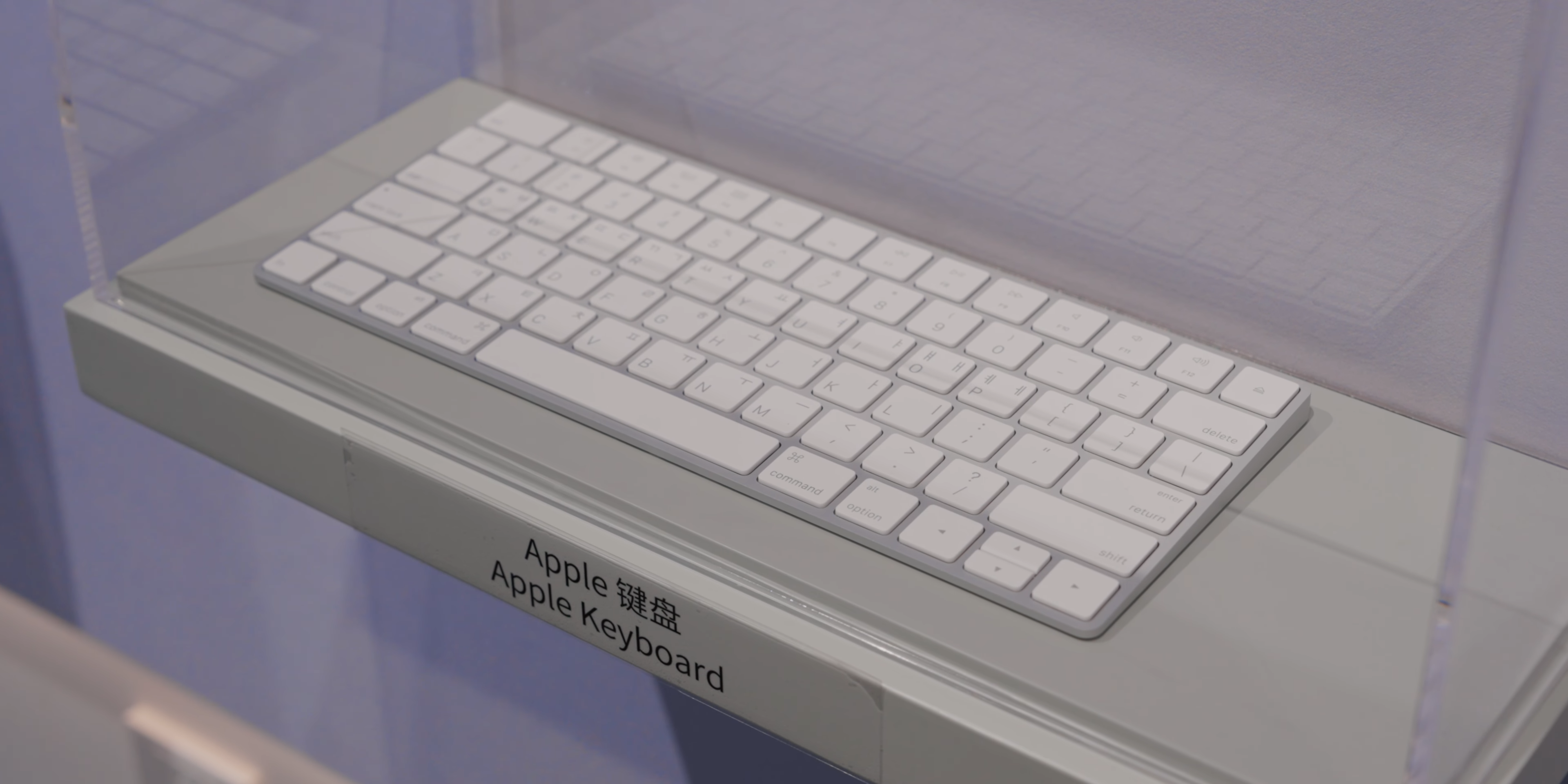
Apple Magic Keyboard

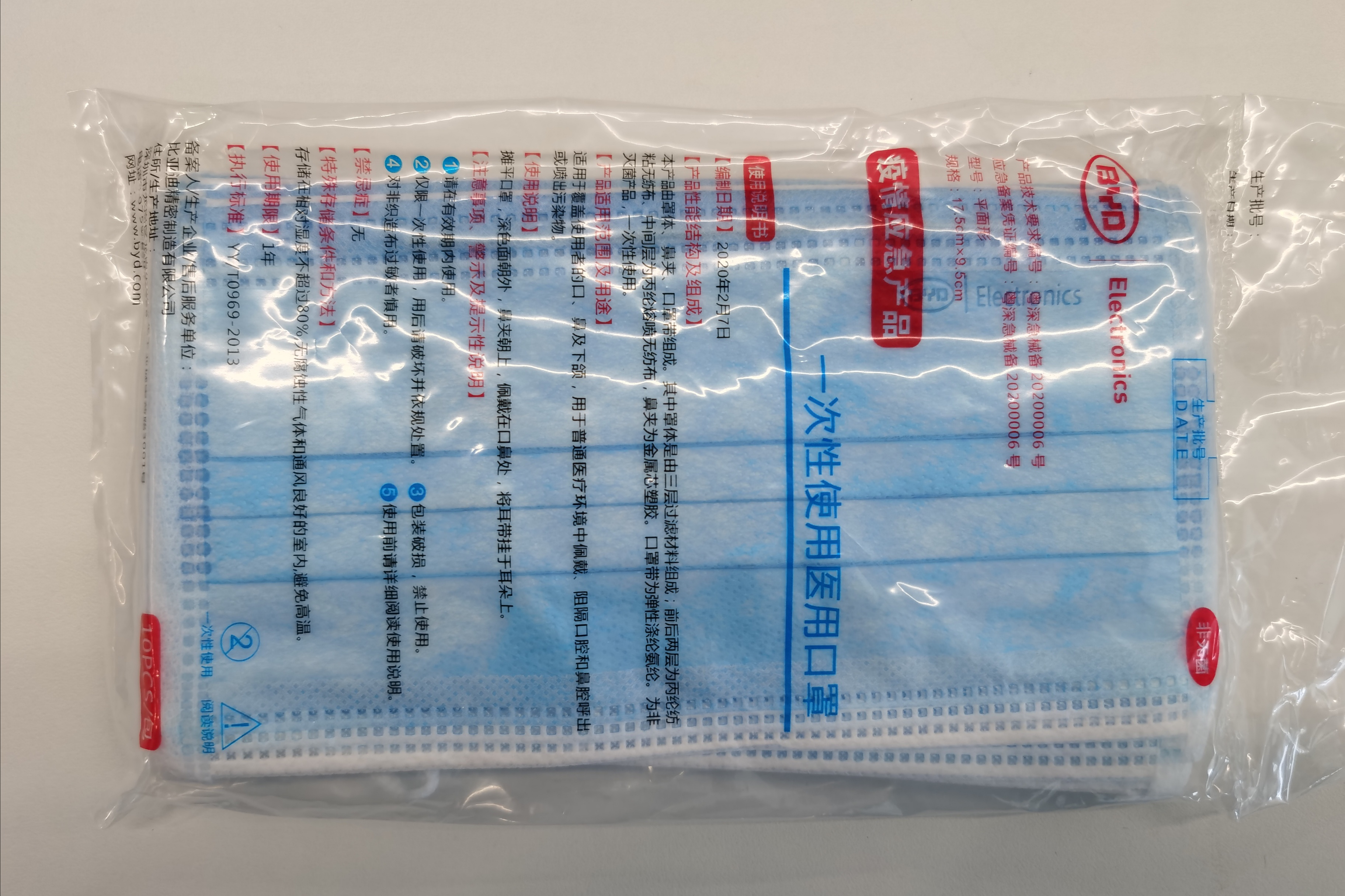
Single-use medical masks produced by BYD Electronics in 2020

=== BYD Semiconductor ===
BYD Semiconductor Co., Ltd. was established in 2020 as the successor to the BYD IC Design Department that was established in 2002. manufactures and distributes semiconductor products such as integrated circuits, insulated gate bipolar transistor modules, light emitting diodes, single chips, and other products. The company planned to issue an initial public offering (IPO) before cancelling it in November 2022 as the company chose to increase investments in wafer production.

=== BYD Forklift ===
BYD Forklift was established in 2009 and headquartered in Zhenjiang, Shaoguan. It develops and produces electric forklifts, towing vehicles and robots with an annual production capacity of 30,000 units. The company marketed its forklifts since 2014.

=== FinDreams ===
FinDreams
- Product type: Automotive components
- Current owner: BYD Company Limited
- Country: China
- Introduced: March 2020; 6 years ago

Chinese name
- Simplified Chinese: 弗迪
- Hanyu Pinyin: Fúdí

FinDreams (Chinese: 弗迪; pinyin: Fúdí) is the brand name used by four automotive supplier companies owned by BYD. These companies were announced in March 2020 as spin-offs from BYD. The establishment of FinDreams companies was done to grow sales of components to other automotive companies. The companies include FinDreams Battery, FinDreams Powertrain, FinDreams Technology, FinDreams Vision (cancelled), and FinDreams Precision.

Its Chinese name, 'Fudi' comes from a poem in the Classic of Poetry, which means honesty, trustworthiness, steadfastness and diligence.

==== FinDreams Battery ====
FinDreams Battery Co., Ltd. was registered on 5 May 2019 as a successor to BYD Lithium Battery Co. Ltd., which was established in 1998. Its products include consumer batteries, electronic batteries, electric vehicle batteries and energy storage batteries. It specializes in lithium iron phosphate (LFP) batteries, including blade battery. As of November 2021, the company has established 15 major production bases in more than 10 cities across China. As of December 2024, FinDreams Battery is the world's second largest producer of electric vehicle batteries below CATL. Manufacturers that have been using LFP batteries produced by FinDreams Battery include Tesla, Toyota, Kia, Ford, Suzuki, KG Mobility, Chery, Xiaomi, XPeng, Nio, FAW, JAC, Dongfeng Nissan, Hozon/Neta, and others.

In early 2022, the company started construction of a joint venture plant with FAW Group called FAW-FinDreams to produce battery packs. BYD held 51% of the shares, while FAW held the rest. Located in Changchun, Jilin, the plant was designed with a total capacity of 45 GWh. The first battery pack rolled off the plant in July 2023, and the plant went operational in September 2023.

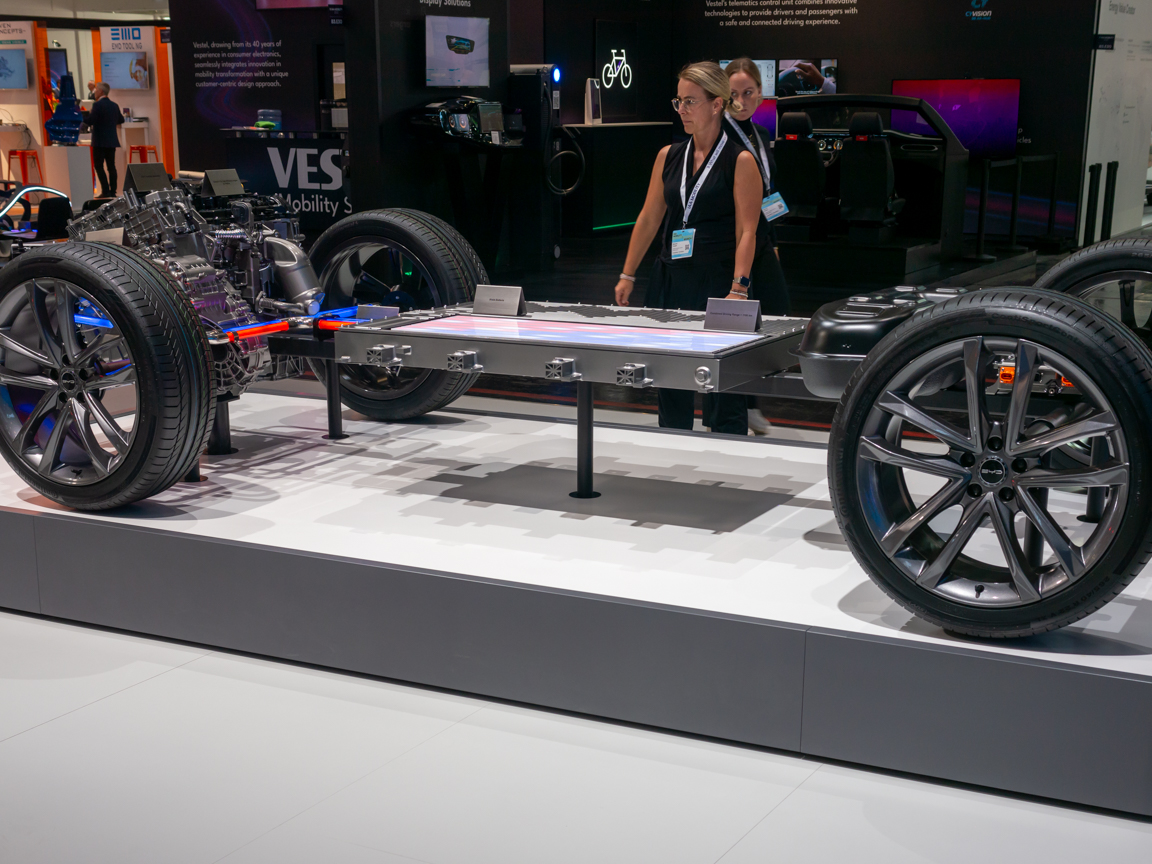
The FinDreams Blade battery, as shown at the IAA Summit 2023, Germany

In June 2023, FinDreams Battery established a joint venture with Huaihai Holding Group, which is best known for electric tricycles and electric scooters, intending to establish the world's largest supplier of sodium-ion batteries. In January 2024, construction of the sodium-ion manufacturing plant started. The CN¥10 billion (US$1.4 billion) plant will have a 30 GWh annual production capacity.

In February 2024, the company signed an 8-year agreement with American automotive supply company, BorgWarner. FinDreams Battery will supply BorgWarner with blade cells for manufacturing LFP battery packs in Europe, the Americas and several Asia Pacific regions. BorgWarner will also secure an intellectual property license to use FinDreams battery pack design and manufacturing process.

In March 2024, FinDreams Battery became a cell supplier to Tesla's energy storage manufacturing in China which operates at the newly built Shanghai Megafactory. It will start supplying 20 percent of the cells needed to produce Tesla's Megapack starting from the first quarter of 2025.

===== BYD Energy Storage =====
FinDreams Battery also owns Shenzhen BYD Energy Storage Co., Ltd., (previously Shenzhen Pingshan FinDreams Battery Co., Ltd.) that produces energy storage products. It produces the BYD Home Energy System, simplified as BYD HES, an integrated product combining solar panels, battery, inverter, etc. This system generated electricity from solar power, and then stored it.

In February 2025, BYD Energy Storage announced a contract with Saudi Electricity Company to provide 12.5 GWh of energy storage.

==== FinDreams Powertrain ====
FinDreams Powertrain Co., Ltd. develops and produces engines and powertrain-related parts such as transmissions, axles, electric car platforms and plug-in hybrid systems.

==== FinDreams Technology ====
FinDreams Technology Co., Ltd. develops and produces automotive electronics and chassis-related parts that are used in passenger cars, commercial vehicles, and rail transit. It has ten major products such as vehicle thermal management, vehicle wiring harness, smart cockpit, advanced driver-assistance system (ADAS), passive safety components, braking system, suspension and exhaust, body control, steering system, and body accessories.

==== FinDreams Precision ====
FinDreams Precision Co., Ltd. (previously FinDreams Molding) operates moulding manufacturing and research and development.

=== RIDE Mobility ===
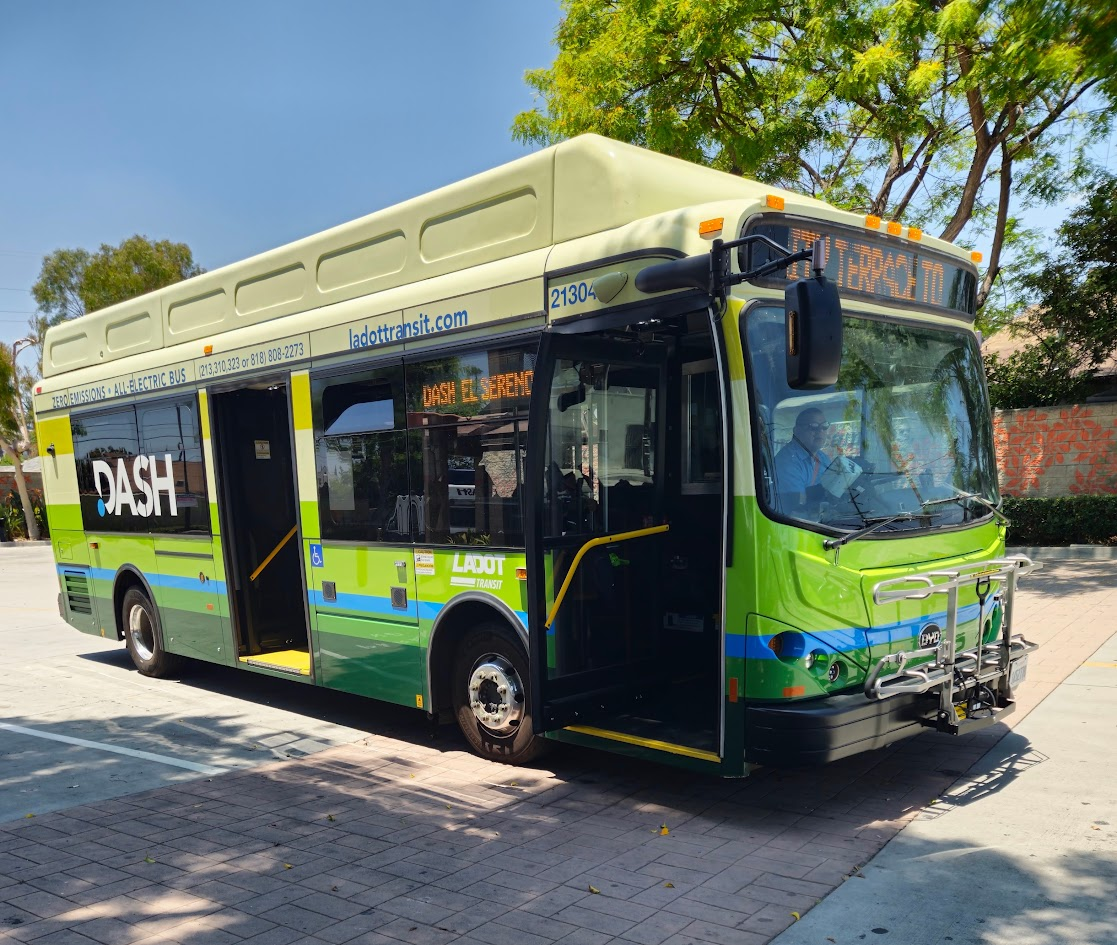
A LADOT bus in Los Angeles that was made by BYD

RIDE is the US spinoff of BYD, focusing on transit solutions in the US and Canada. Headquartered in Pasadena, California, US, the company was announced in 2023 and during a transition period, in which it won awards for innovative school bus designs, was known publicly as BYD | RIDE. RIDE operates the former BYD Coach & Bus facility in Lancaster, California. Type A, C, and D school buses, transit buses and trucks are manufactured and assembled at the facility, which employs about 500 American union workers who are affiliated with the SMART union. RIDE battery electric school buses have been deployed in Oakland, California in concert with Zum.

=== Guided transit ===
==== SkyRail monorail ====
BYD constructed monorail systems around the world, including the Guang'an Metro and the Guilin Metro in China, Line 17 in São Paulo and the SkyRail Bahia, both in Brazil. BYD is also part of a consortium that was awarded a pre-development contract to build a monorail from the San Fernando Valley to LAX via the Sepulveda Pass in Los Angeles.

==== SkyShuttle ====
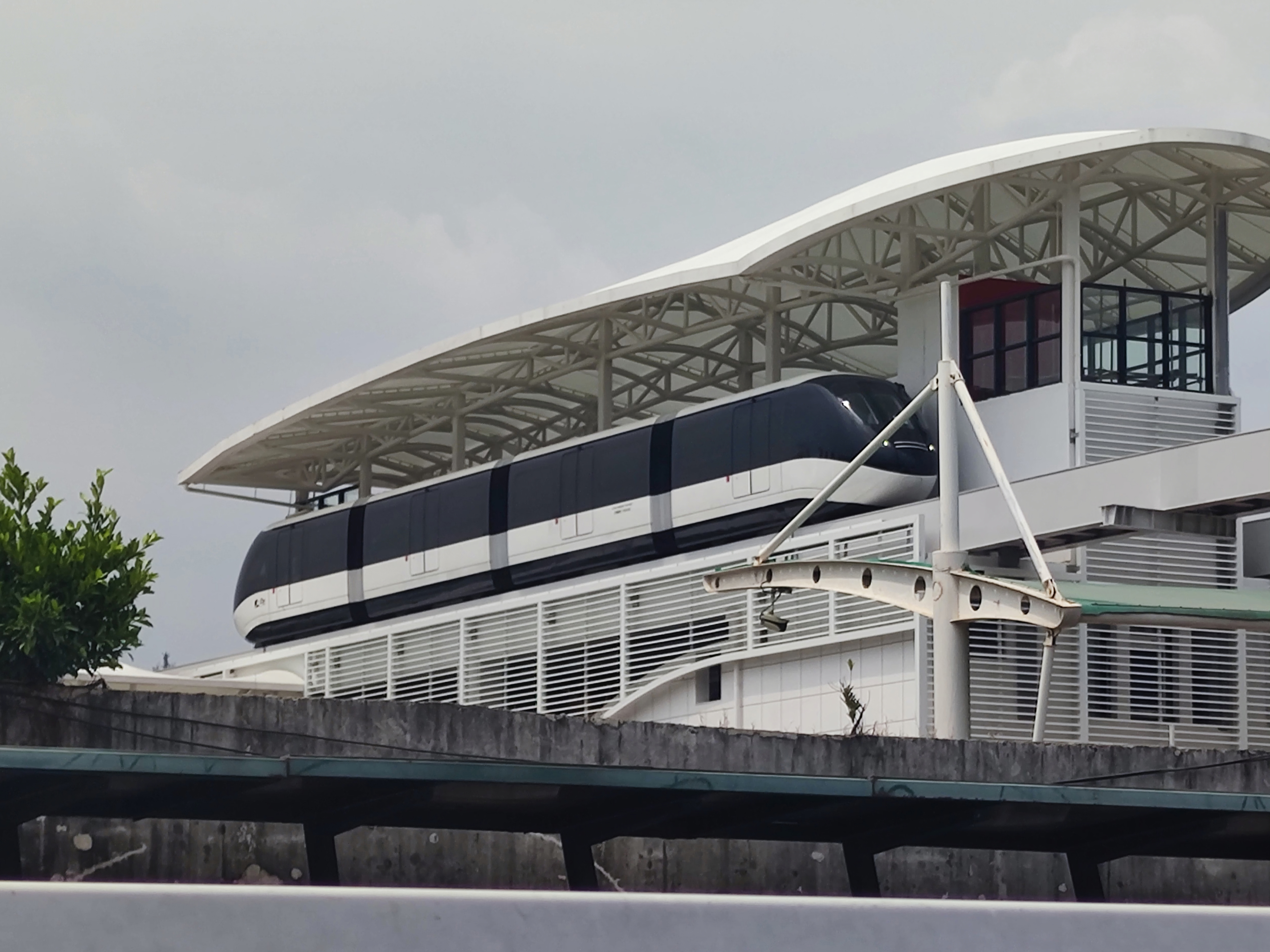
Pingshan SkyShuttle elevated tram line in Pingshan, Shenzhen, is owned by BYD.

BYD also offers another Automated guideway transit (AGT) system, known as "SkyShuttle" (Chinese: 云巴; lit. 'cloud bus'). SkyShuttle trains are autonomous and battery powered. They run like monorails on beams, with one difference: the guiding wheels of a monorail train embrace the single beam while the SkyShuttle's guiding wheels are located between two beams of the track. Essentially the SkyShuttle acts like a monorail, but with two "rails". In-house development took 7 years and cost over 1.5 billion USD.

Operational SkyShuttle systems in China:

- Pingshan SkyShuttle, Shenzhen
- Bishan SkyShuttle, Chongqing
- Jinan SkyShuttle, Jinan

=== Cargo ship ===
Eight purpose-built roll-on/roll-off (RoRo) cargo ships, each ship can transport 9200 vehicles, delivering a million vehicles per year. Most of the ships use the same name as cities in China. Each ship is 219m long, 37.7m wide and 50m tall, with 16 decks (14 decks for cargo). June 2026, the biggest RoRo ship in the world. Battery-hybrid dual-fuel liquefied natural gas (LNG) engines, hybrid uses BYD modular batteries. Built by China Merchants Jinling Shipyard (CMJL) in Jiangsu, China.

== Operations ==
=== Workforce ===
In 2021, BYD had 288,000 employees. BYD workforce reached 570,000 employees in 2022, after the company hired 280,000 employees in a single year. At that year, BYD became the private enterprise company with the largest workforce in China, and only below several state-owned companies such as China National Petroleum Corporation, State Grid Corporation of China and China Post. By the end of 2023, the company had 704,000 employees, with 133,000 new hires that year. This workforce count is nearly double that of Toyota, which has 375,000 employees. In 2024, BYD hired close to 200,000 new employees in car manufacturing and components. In December 2024, the company has 968,900 employees.

==== 2021 employee sudden death ====
On 5 November 2021, a 36-year-old employee of BYD was reported dead in his rented home. According to his relatives, his sudden death was due to high-intensity overtime work. No autopsy was conducted, so the cause of death remains unclear. BYD agreed to pay the deceased employee's family a lump sum of CN¥200,000 in compensation.

=== Research and development ===
BYD heavily invested in core component development, with a substantial research and development (R&D) budget and personnel. Founder Securities data reveals that BYD's R&D investment reached CN¥7.99 billion in 2021 with a 12.9% rise in R&D personnel, totaling 40,382 employees in 2021. The company also increased its patent filing by 19.7% year-on-year in 2020, with 29,777 patents.

In 2022, BYD invested CN¥18.65 billion in R&D, more than double than its 2021 budget. In 2023, BYD spent CN¥39.91 billion on R&D, which is 6% of its operating income. In that year, the company also recruited 33,000 new R&D personnel, increasing the total number to 102,000. Among these R&D employees, 60% are under the age of 30. Additionally, BYD disclosed in its financial report that the average annual salary for R&D personnel is around CN¥212,000.

=== Manufacturing ===
==== Supply chain ====
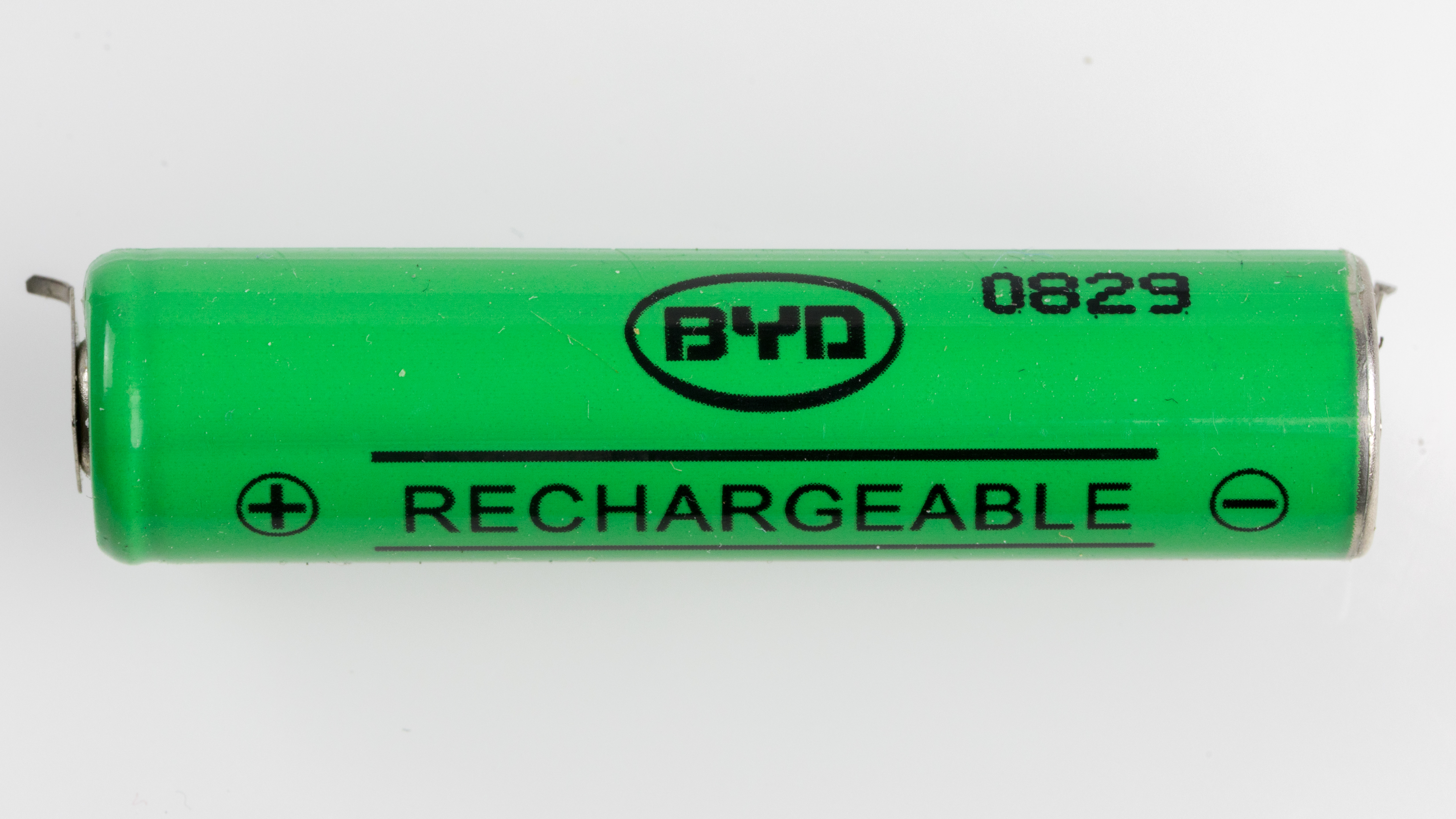
BYD nickel–metal hydride rechargeable AA battery

BYD is characterized by its vertical supply chain system, originating as a battery company in 1995 before venturing into cars (via BYD Auto) in 2003. At the same time, BYD also leverages China's low labour costs, transforming production lines for power batteries from capital-intensive to labour-intensive, ensuring a competitive edge through a robust supply chain system and reduced production costs. The company has been recognized for innovation; for example it has developed technologies that allow mobile phone batteries to be made at room temperature rather than in expensive, heated dry rooms.

When BYD entered the automobile industry, it built a fully integrated automotive supply chain. The company achieved this by reverse engineering competitor products and supplier parts. The company had also achieved proficiency in producing key components for electric vehicles, such as batteries, motors, and electronic control. This vertical integration model strengthened its industrial chain and mitigates challenges such as the global chip shortage.

BYD diversified into research and development of semiconductor by establishing BYD Semiconductor in 2020. Core components, including automotive chips and the DiLink automotive intelligent system, were independently developed. The establishment of FinDreams companies from December 2019 focused on power batteries, automotive lighting, electronics, powertrain, and moulding.

In early 2020, BYD transitioned its parts and components division into subsidiary companies, collectively known as FinDreams. It enabled independent operations for these companies, making component supply to other automotive companies easier.

BYD has also invested in mining operations to secure consistent access to lithium and other essential raw materials. In 2022, the company partnered with Chilean lithium producer SQM and was also linked to resource deals in Africa for cobalt and manganese. BYD backed out of the plan to build lithium cathode plants in Chile due to plunging lithium prices. These initiatives have helped BYD stabilize production costs and ensure steady supply, protecting it from the price and supply fluctuations that have affected the industry. BYD also acquired mineral rights for two plots in Jequitinhonha Valley in Brazil. Covering 852 hectares in Coronel Murta, Minas Gerais, an area known as Brazil's "Lithium Valley", the region recognized for its abundant lithium reserves.

In 2023, BYD also formed a joint venture with Zhejiang Huayou Cobalt to expand refining capacity in China to ensure higher quality standards, reducing reliance on third-party refiners, and improving flexibility in meeting demand surges.

==== Facilities ====
Some BYD facilities in China

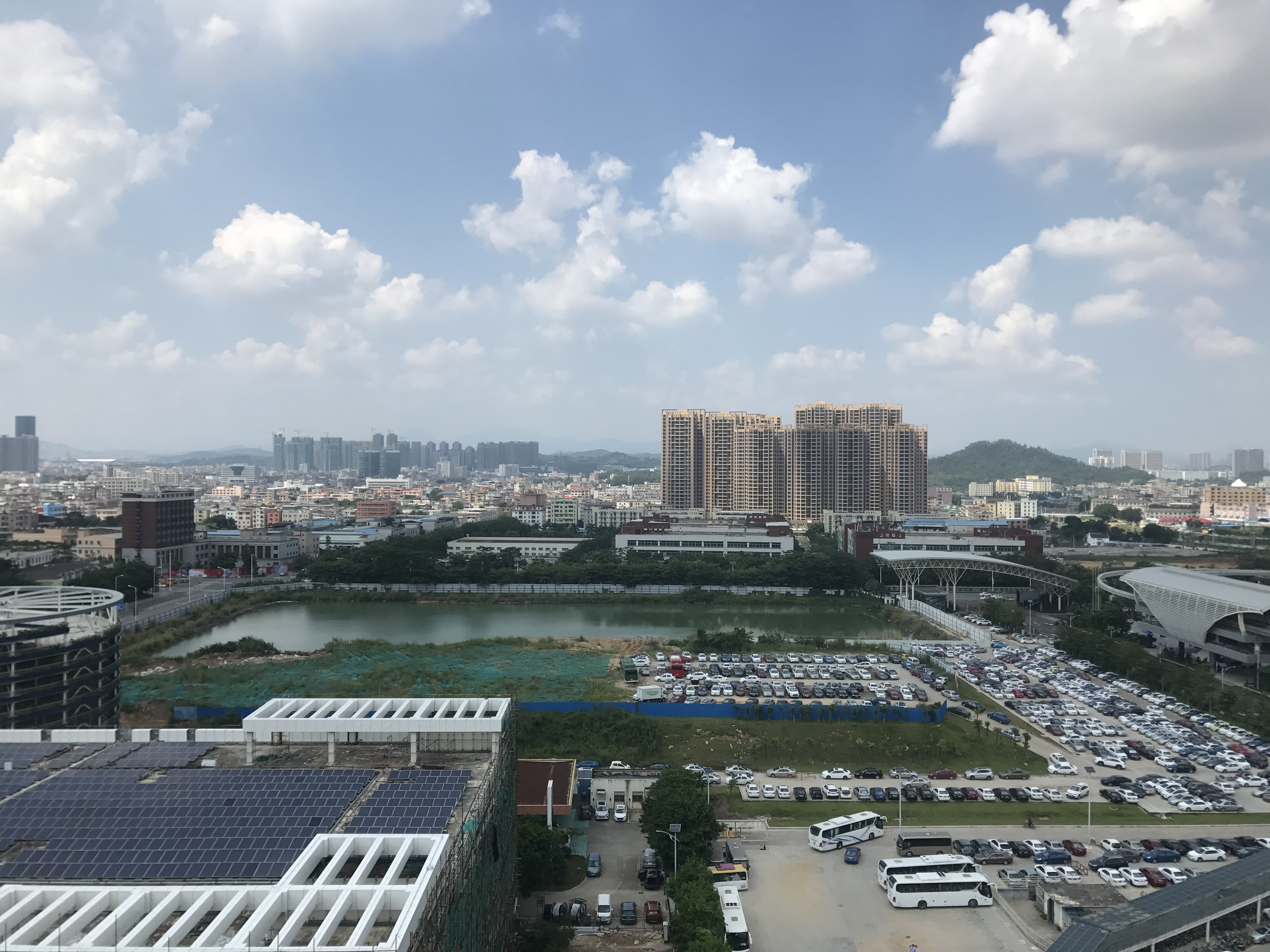
View near BYD headquarters in Pingshan, Shenzhen

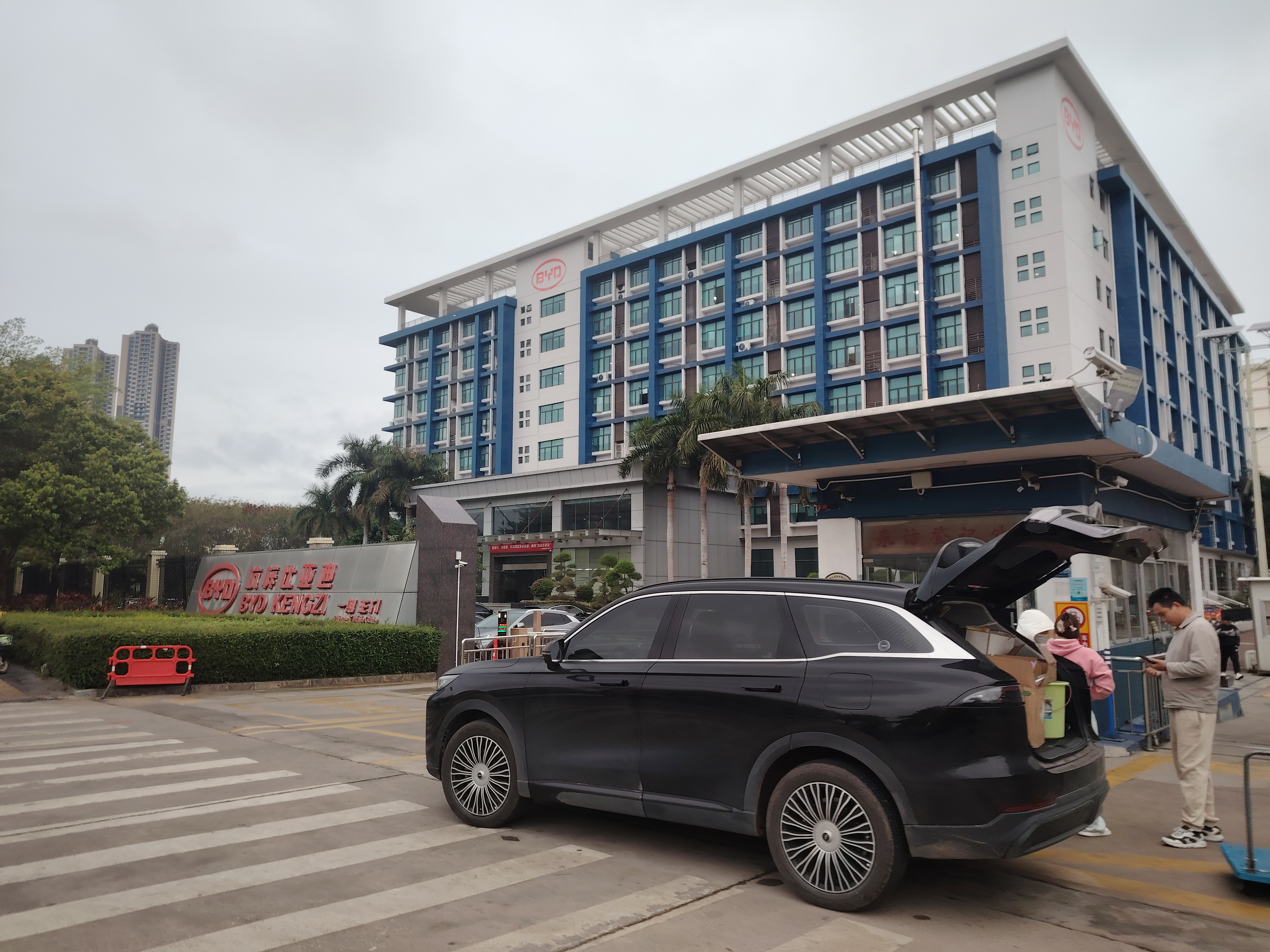
A BYD facility in Kengzi, Shenzhen

BYD has many production bases, including three locations in Shenzhen (one of which is on the 'BYD Road' (simplified Chinese: 比亚迪路; traditional Chinese: 比亞迪路; pinyin: Bǐyàdí Lù) in Pingshan District, Shenzhen), as well as sites in Huizhou, Shanxi, and Shanghai. The first plant of the company in India was opened in Chennai.

BYD's automotive business operates an extensive network of vehicle manufacturing facilities across China, encompassing both wholly owned plants and subsidiaries. Its major production centers include the Xi'an plant in Xi'an, Shaanxi with a capacity of 900,000 vehicles annually and the Hefei plant in Changfeng, Hefei, Anhui with 1.32 million vehicles per year. Additional large-scale facilities are located in Changsha, Hunan; Shenzhen, Guangdong; Changzhou, Jiangsu, Zhengzhou, Henan, and Jinan, Shandong, contributing to the production of passenger vehicles, and additionally key components such as engines, traction motors, and battery systems. BYD also runs specialized branches focused on electric buses in various cities including Dalian, Guilin, and Wuhan, and produces special-purpose electric vehicles and commercial trucks at other dedicated sites. As of 2024, BYD's annual vehicle production capacity in China has reached 5.82 million vehicles. Additionally, BYD has expanded its automotive manufacturing footprint beyond China, such as in Thailand, Indonesia, Uzbekistan, Brazil, Hungary, and Turkey.

The company also operates photovoltaic module (solar panel) Bloomberg New Energy Finance Tier 1 manufacturing plant in Beijing, an R&D center and nascent automobile assembly line in Shenzhen, and an R&D center in Shanghai. In 2020, BYD built a new facility in Chongqing, China for producing its blade battery, which are considered to be the safest EV batteries.

In Brazil, it opened its first facility 2015 for the production of electric buses. In April 2017, it inaugurated its second plant for photovoltaic modules. In 2020, BYD opened its third manufacturing plant in the country in Manaus, specifically for lithium iron phosphate batteries, for use in electric buses. It is developing facilities in Campinas and Camaçari, the latter slated to begin producing 150,000 passenger vehicles annually from 2025.

In Southeast Asia, BYD is setting up production lines in Cambodia, Indonesia, and Thailand, with capacities ranging from 10,000 to 150,000 vehicles per year. In Europe, BYD has two electric bus assembly facilities in Europe in Komárom, Hungary and Beauvais, France. It plans to open a passenger vehicle plant in Szeged, Hungary by 2026, as well as another in Manisa, Turkey.

BYD also operates an electric bus manufacturing plant in Lancaster, California, near Los Angeles, since 2014. In 2019, a bus plant opened in Newmarket, Ontario to handle orders in Canada.

== Corporate affairs ==
=== Business trends ===
The key trends of BYD are (as of the financial year ending 31 December):

Year	Revenue (CN¥ bn)	Net income (CN¥ bn)	Revenue source		Number of employees (k)	Number of sold passenger cars (1000s)	Source
Year	Revenue (CN¥ bn)	Net income (CN¥ bn)	Automobile	Non-automobile	Number of employees (k)	Number of sold passenger cars (1000s)	Source
2016	100	5.0	55%	45%		510	
2017	102	4.0	53%	47%	201	421	
2018	130	2.7	59%	41%	221	528	
2019	127	1.6	49%	51%	229	468	
2020	156	4.2	53%	47%	224	431	
2021	216	3.0	60%	40%	418	749	
2022	424	16.6	77%	23%	570	1,882	
2023	602	30.0	80%	20%	703	3,024	
2024	777	40.3	79%	21%	969	4,272	
2025	804	32.6	81%	19%	870	4,602	

=== Management ===
Notable members of the senior management of the company are as follows:

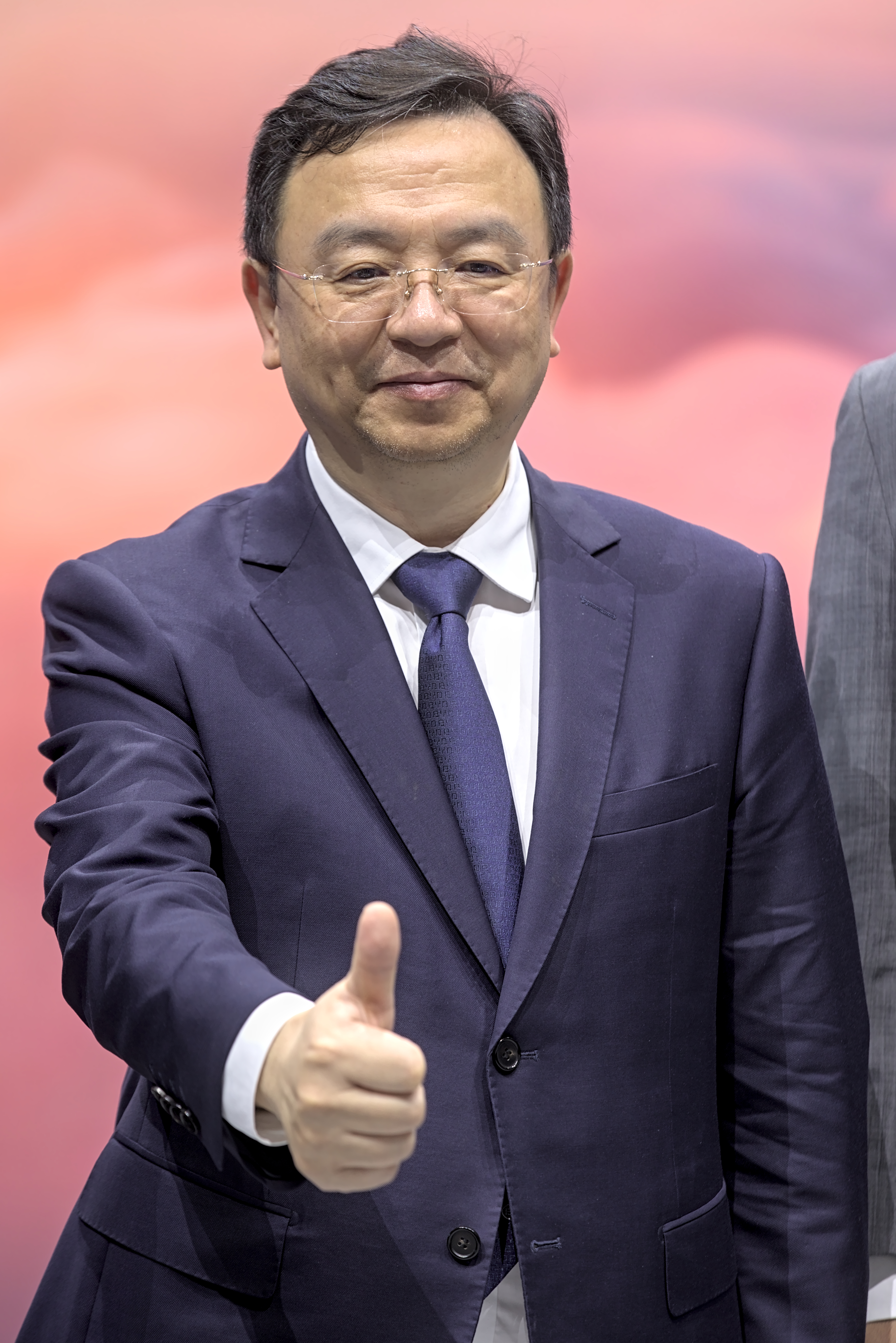
BYD's founder, chairman and president, Wang Chuanfu

Executive director

- Wang Chuanfu, also chairman and president

Non-executive directors

- Lu Xiangyang, co-founder, also vice chairman
- Xia Zuoquan

Independent non-executive directors

- Cai Hongping
- Zhang Min
- Yu Ling

Supervisory Board

- Li Yongzhao
- Zhu Aiyun
- Wang Zhen
- Huang Jiangfeng
- Tang Mei

Senior management

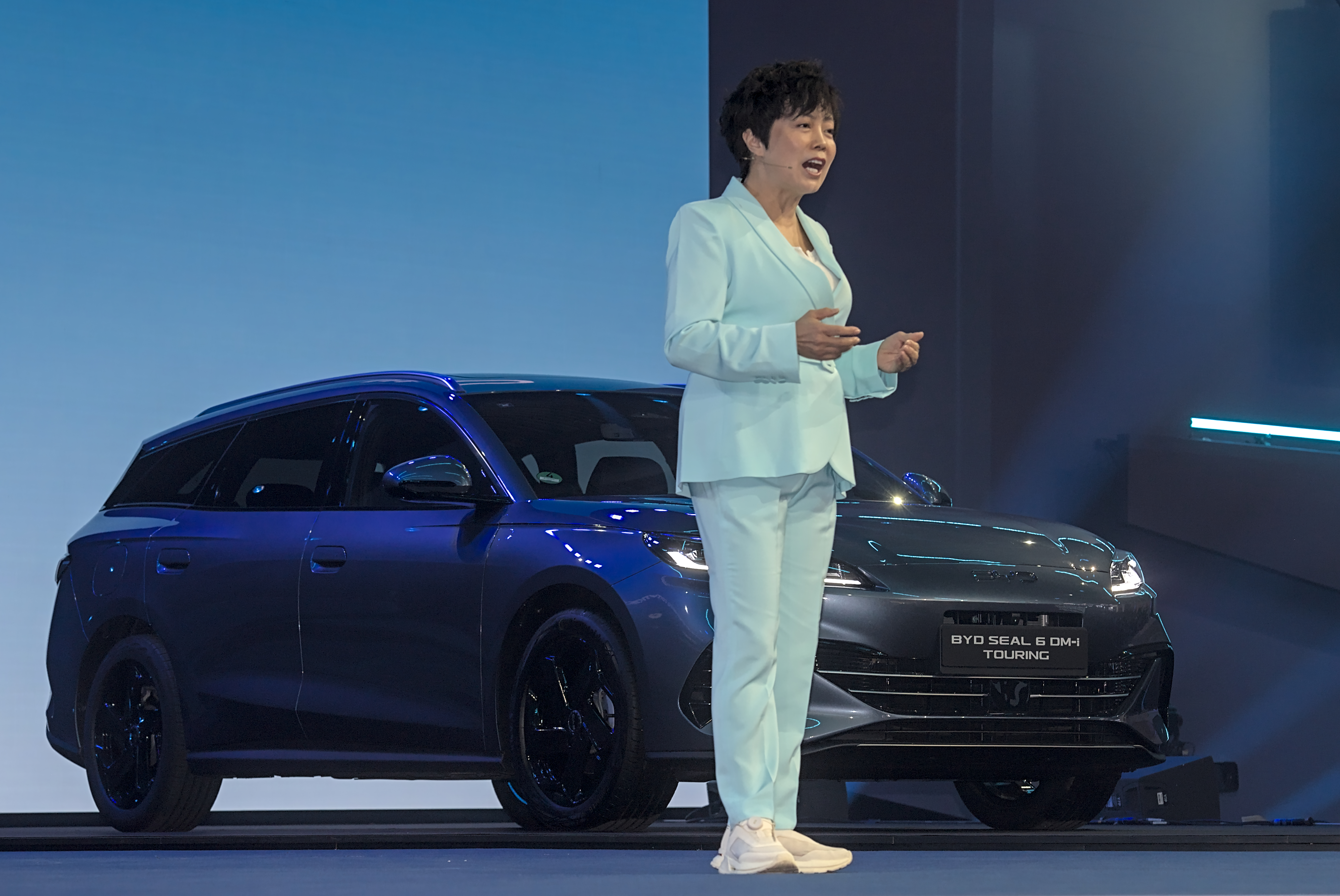
Stella Li, executive vice president, spearheaded BYD's expansion overseas

- Li Ke (Stella Li), executive vice president, president of BYD Americas, Europe, Middle East & Africa
- He Zhiqi, executive vice president, COO of BYD Passenger Car Division, director of Shenzhen Denza New Energy Automotive
- He Long, executive vice president, chairman of FinDreams Battery
- Luo Hongbin, senior vice president, chairman of Shenzhen BYD Auto Industrial Co., Ltd. and FinDreams Powertrain
- Zhou Yalin, senior vice president, CFO, also CFO of BYD Electronic (International), director of BYD Semiconductor, chairman of BYD Auto Finance, chairman of Shenzhen BYD Property Insurance
- Yang Dongsheng, senior vice president
- Liu Huanming, vice president
- Wang Chuanfang, vice president
- Ren Lin, vice president
- Zhao Jianping, vice president
- Luo Zhongliang, vice president, chairman of FinDreams Technology
- Li Wei, officer of the President's Office
- Li Qian, company secretary, secretary to the Board, director of BYD Semiconductor

== Recognition ==
In 2010, BYD topped the Bloomberg Businessweek Tech 100 that listed fast-growing tech companies. In that year, BusinessWeek ranked BYD the eighth most innovative company in the world and that same year saw Fast Company ranking BYD as the 16th most innovative. In 2016, BYD won the Zayed Future Energy Prize award for Large Corporations for their development of robust rechargeable batteries. In 2017, PV Magazine awarded BYD the top category of innovation on its newly launched battery storage system that advances progress in three categories: modularity, charging and discharging capacity, and efficiency.

== Lawsuits and disputes ==
=== 2006–2012 Foxconn disputes ===
In June 2006, Shenzhen Futaihong Precision Industry Company and Hong Fu Jin Precision Industry (Shenzhen) Co. Ltd., affiliates of Foxconn Technology Group, filed a lawsuit against BYD in the Shenzhen intermediate people's court. Foxconn alleged that former employees Liu and Si, who had joined BYD's mobile phone design department, had stolen trade secrets. The plaintiff sought 5 million yuan in compensation.

During the trial, the Shenzhen intermediate people's court referred the case to the Supreme People's Court, which appointed the Beijing JZSC Intellectual Property Forensic Center to conduct an appraisal. The forensic analysis examined files found at BYD, to determine whether the information was common knowledge. The initial appraisal identified 68 out of 116 Foxconn files as non-public knowledge. Foxconn argued that these files contained critical production, assembly, and testing processes, making them proprietary trade secrets. The company also highlighted that over 400 former employees had moved from Foxconn to BYD, including senior technicians and managers trained in Europe with Foxconn's funding. The rapid growth of BYD's mobile manufacturing business coincided with this employee migration and Foxconn's alleged trade secret leakage.

In addition to patent litigation, Foxconn sued BYD in Hong Kong and Illinois, U.S. in June 2007, alleging BYD poached 50 Foxconn employees and was complicit in the stealing of trade secrets to set up a competing cell phone manufacturing operation. Court proceedings disrupted the planned public listing of BYD Electronics in Hong Kong Stock Exchange. BYD's initial listing application expired, leading to a second attempt in September 2007, which was again met with legal action from Foxconn, delaying the listing for another six months.

In 2008, the Shenzhen Baoan People's Court ruled that the files in question contained non-public information with economic value, finding BYD guilty of trade secret infringement. Afterwards, Foxconn withdrew the civil proceedings against BYD in mainland China, and sought criminal prosecution, as the case was deemed to involve criminal activity. On 20 March 2008, the former executive director and Vice President of BYD was arrested. Then on 24 and 31 March 2008, two former employees of Foxconn were arrested and sentenced to 1 year and 4 months, and 4 years in prison respectively. In October 2009, BYD issued a counterclaim to Foxconn in Hong Kong court, alleging defamation and bribery of Chinese officials as well as intimidation on Foxconn's part.

In 2012, the Hong Kong High Court rejected Foxconn's appeals against BYD, while also questioning BYD's counterclaims of defamation and misuse of legal proceedings. BYD denied Foxconn's allegations of trade secret theft and accused Foxconn of coercing former employees into making false confessions and tampering with evidence.

=== In the United States ===
On 27 April 2020, BYD hired attorney Charles Harder and filed a federal civil complaint in U.S. District Court for the Southern District of New York, against Vice Media alleging defamation for a story about BYD being associated with companies alleged to be using forced Uyghur labor in its supply chain which was published on 11 April 2020. BYD's case was dismissed with prejudice in March 2021. The U.S. Court of Appeals for the Second Circuit affirmed the dismissal. The U.S. Supreme Court denied BYD's petition for review.

In November 2020, BYD filed a libel lawsuit against the non-profit Alliance for American Manufacturing (AAM) and some of its employees for calling BYD an arm of the Chinese state and linking it to Uyghur forced labor. The U.S. District Court for the District of Columbia ruled that BYD failed to establish that AAM's statements were defamatory, and dismissed the lawsuit. The U.S. Court of Appeals for the District of Columbia affirmed the dismissal. The U.S. Supreme Court declined to hear BYD's appeal in August 2022.

In 2022, the United States Department of Commerce found that BYD had circumvented tariffs on solar panels by routing its operations through Southeast Asian countries. In August 2023, the U.S. Department of Commerce issued a final determination on BYD, determining they circumvented tariffs.

The National Defense Authorization Act for Fiscal Year 2024 signed into law on 22 December 2024 prohibits the U.S. Department of Defense from procuring BYD batteries on security grounds. In October 2025, the United States Department of Defense stated that BYD merits inclusion on a list of companies linked to China's military. In June 2026 the US Department of Defense added the company to its list of "Chinese military companies."
