= Stella Li =

Chinese business executive

- 李柯
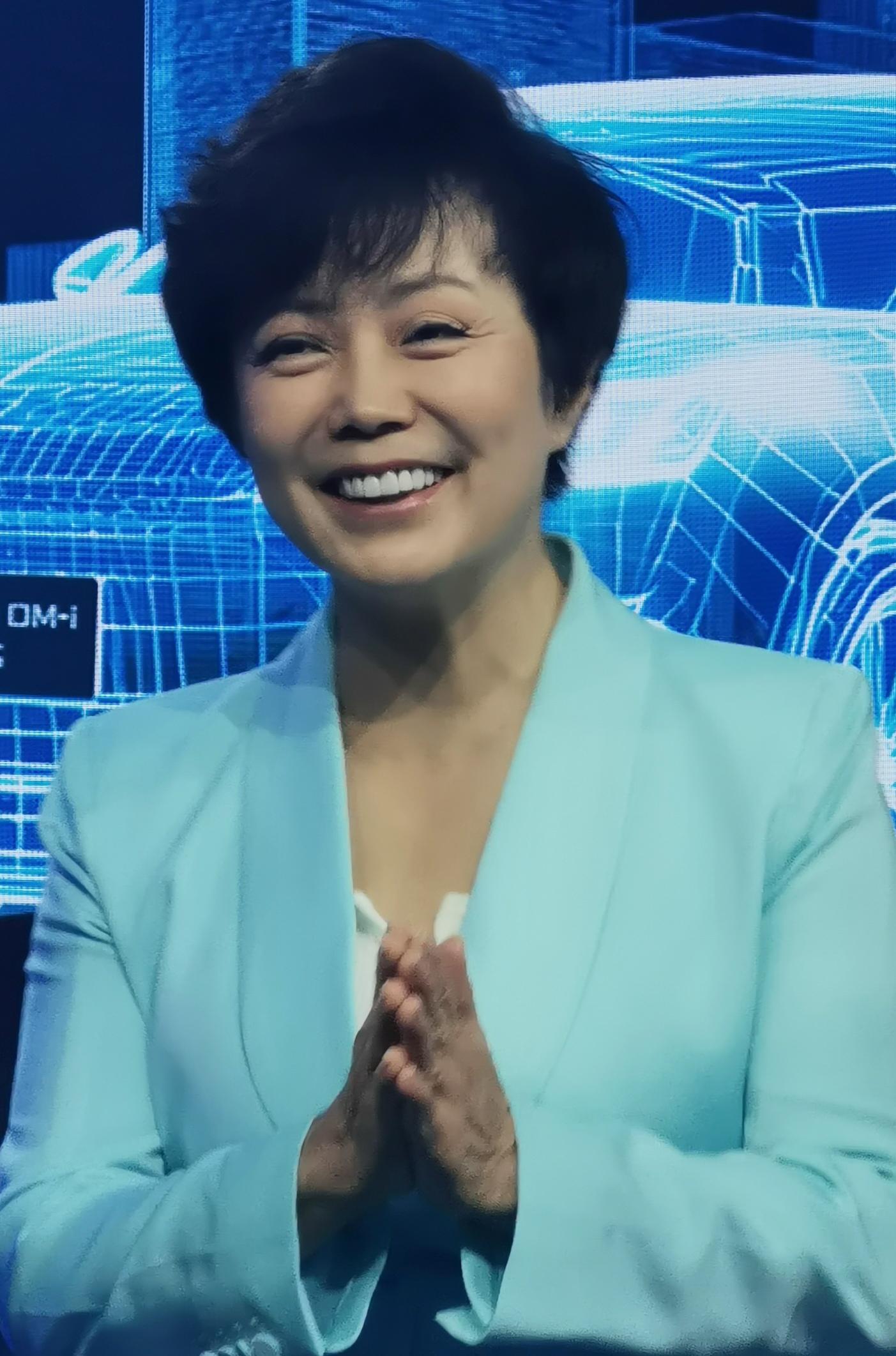
- Li in 2025
- Born: 1969 (age 56–57); Xiantao, Hubei, China
- Education: Fudan University
- Occupation: Executive vice president of BYD Company
- Known for: Global expansion of BYD; first woman to win World Car Person of the Year

Stella Li
- Simplified Chinese: 李柯
Transcriptions
Standard Mandarin
- Hanyu Pinyin: Lǐ Kē

Stella Li (Chinese: 李柯; pinyin: Lǐ Kē; born 1969) is a Chinese business executive who serves as executive vice president of BYD Company Limited and CEO of BYD Americas, Europe, the Middle East and Africa. She is widely credited with driving BYD's international expansion, overseeing the company's growth from a domestic battery manufacturer into the world's largest producer of plug-in vehicles.

In January 2025, Li was named World Car Person of the Year by the World Car Awards, becoming the first woman and the first person representing a Chinese automaker to receive the award in its history. The selection was made by automotive journalists from 30 countries.

== Early life and education ==
Li was born in Xiantao, Hubei province, China. She received a bachelor's degree in statistics from Fudan University in 1992. Before joining the private sector, Li worked in international trade for a Chinese state-owned enterprise from 1990 to 1996.

== Career ==
Li joined BYD in September 1996 as a marketing manager for global exports, at a time when the company was primarily a manufacturer of rechargeable batteries for mobile phones and consumer electronics. In 1997 she opened BYD's first overseas office in Hong Kong. In 1999 she founded BYD's first European office in Rotterdam, Netherlands, and established an initial North American sales presence in Chicago. During this period Li secured Motorola, Nokia, and Samsung as major accounts for BYD's battery products, personally travelling across the United States and Europe carrying battery samples and spending months courting procurement teams including Motorola's battery research and development facility in Atlanta.

In February 2010, Li was appointed president of BYD Americas, responsible for business development, public policy engagement, and strategic partnerships across the Americas. She relocated BYD's North American headquarters from Chicago to Los Angeles, California in 2011, and in 2013 established an electric bus factory in Lancaster, California, which became one of BYD's primary production sites for heavy-duty electric vehicles in North America. Under her leadership, BYD secured contracts for zero-emission electric buses with transit agencies in Los Angeles, Long Beach, and other major North American cities, establishing BYD as one of the largest suppliers of electric buses in the United States at that time.

Li also oversaw BYD's expansion into Latin America, where the company supplies electric buses and taxis in countries including Chile, Brazil, and Colombia. BYD's Camaçari plant in Bahia, Brazil, inaugurated in October 2025, was among the projects Li oversaw in her expanded role.

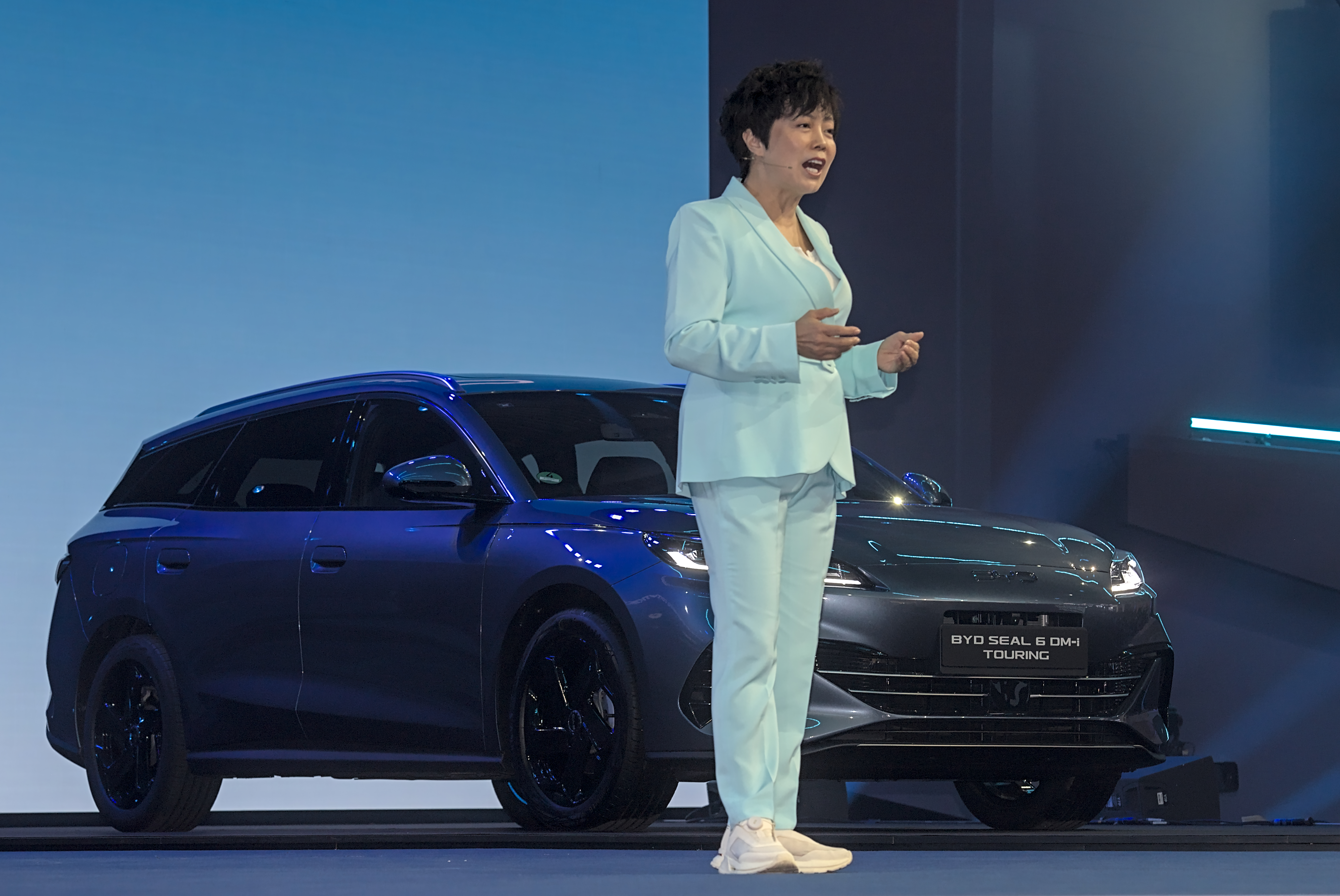
Li during the introduction of the BYD Seal 6 DM-i in Germany

In May 2024, Li replaced Michael Shu to lead BYD's European operations following what Reuters described as several strategic missteps in the region, including over-reliance on third-party distributors in key markets. Li led the transition from distributor-led sales to direct operations in several European countries, including Sweden, where BYD ended its relationship with distributor Hedin Mobility in July 2025.

At the IAA Mobility 2025 show in Munich, Li confirmed that BYD's factory in Budapest, Hungary would begin production by the end of 2025, with the Dolphin Surf as its first model. She also announced that BYD would expand its European retail network to over 2,000 locations by the end of 2026, including nearly tripling the number of sales and service sites in Germany. Li also announced BYD's Flash Charging network for Europe, targeting 200 to 300 installations by the second quarter of 2026, using onboard battery storage to deliver up to one megawatt of output from grid connections of 50 to 100 kilowatts.

Li additionally spearheaded BYD's European plug-in hybrid strategy, announcing in October 2024 that BYD would produce PHEVs alongside battery electric vehicles at its European plants. The Seal U DM-i became Europe's fourth best-selling PHEV overall and its best-selling PHEV in March 2025.

== Awards and recognition ==
Year	Award	Organisation	Source
2017	US-China Business Leadership Award	US-China Policy Foundation	
2018	Woman of the Year, 49th Assembly District	California Legislative Women's Caucus	
2018	Business Leader Award	Project Sunshine	
2021	Most Powerful Women in China	Fortune China	
2021	60 Outstanding Chinese in North America; Women in Tech	Forbes China	
2022	Asian Women Empowered Visionary	Asia Society Southern California	
2022, 2023, 2024, 2025	Most Powerful Women in China	Fortune China	
November 2023	TIME100 Climate	Time	
2024	Power Businesswomen Asia	Forbes Asia	
January 2025	World Car Person of the Year	World Car Awards	
2025	The Influence List	Financial Times	
2025	Xataka Legend Award	Xataka	
2025	Automotive D.R.I.V.E. Visionary Leader	Reuters	
2026	TIME100 AI	Time	
