= Line 19 (Shenzhen Metro) =

Future Shenzhen Metro line

- 19

Overview
- Status: Under construction
- Locale: Shenzhen, Guangdong
- Termini: Nantangwei (Phase 1) Future: Henggang; Julong (Phase 1) Future: Kengzi
- Stations: 12 (Phase 1)

Service
- Type: Rapid transit
- System: Shenzhen Metro
- Services: 1
- Operator: SZMC (Shenzhen Metro Group)

History
- Planned opening: 2028; 2 years' time

Technical
- Line length: 12.5km (Phase 1)
- Character: Underground
- Operating speed: 80km/h

Line 19 of the Shenzhen Metro is a line under construction, which will connect the districts of Longgang and Pingshan for 33 kilometers and 18 stations. Construction began on 9 May 2024, and the line is expected to open in 2028. The first phase of Line 19 will run from Nantangwei to Julong in Pingshan District, with 12 stations and 12.5 kilometers of track. The line is proposed to use 6 car type B trains.

== Stations (Phase 1) ==
Station name		Connections	Location
English	Chinese	Connections	Location
Nantangwei	南塘围		Pingshan
Pingshan People's Hospital	坪山人民医院		Pingshan
Tang-keng	汤坑		Pingshan
Jinlong	锦龙	14	Pingshan
Xinwei	新围		Pingshan
Baoshan	宝山		Pingshan
Xinhe	新和	16	Pingshan
Pingshan Theater	坪山剧院		Pingshan
Pingshan Center	坪山中心	14	Pingshan
Yanziling	燕子岭	Pingshan SkyShuttle Line 1	Pingshan
Nanbu	南布		Pingshan
Julong	聚龙		Pingshan
