= Pingshanwei station =

Shenzhen Metro Line 14 and Line 16 station

Pingshanwei 坪山围
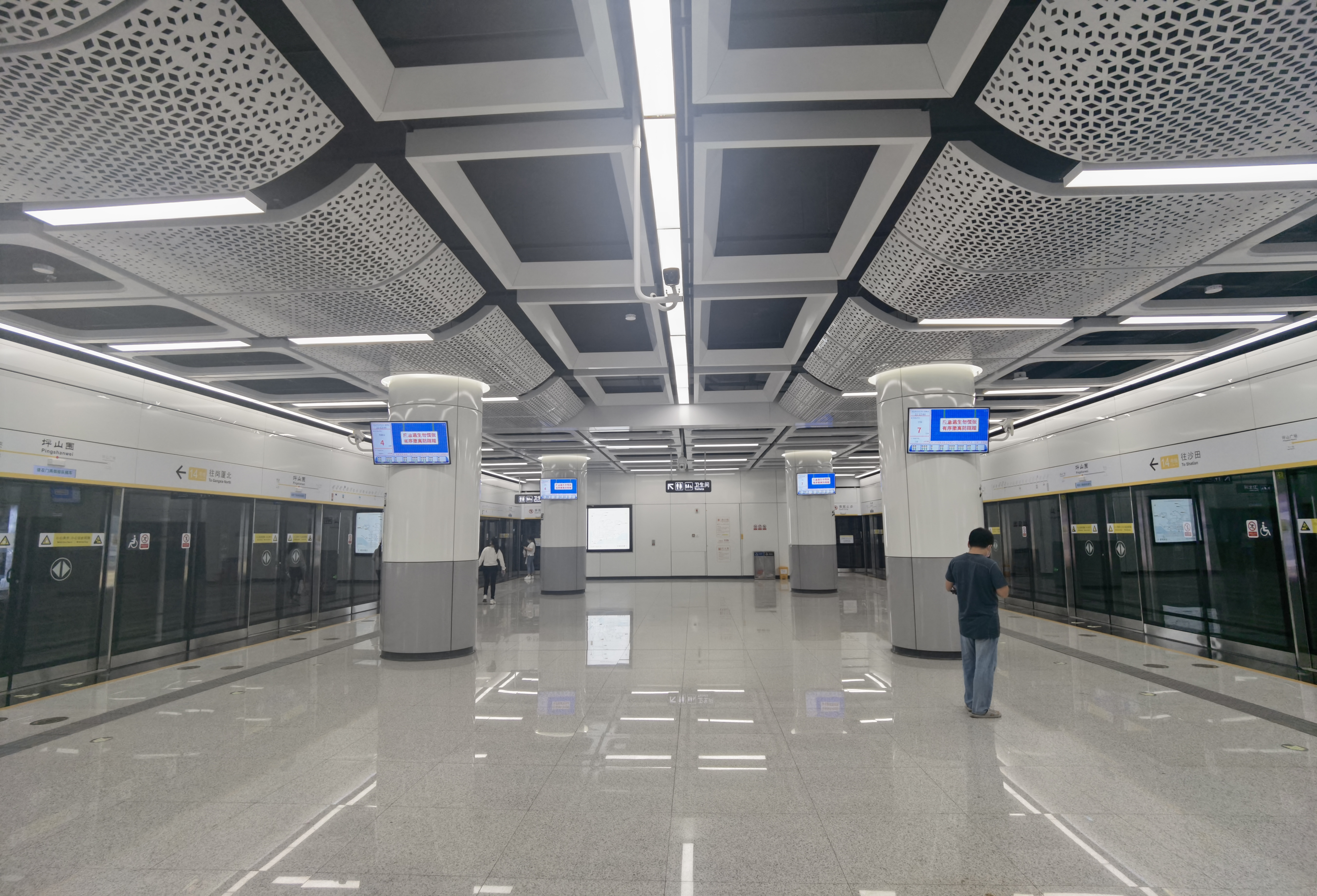
- Line 14 Platform

Chinese name
- Traditional Chinese: 坪山圍
- Simplified Chinese: 坪山围
Transcriptions
Standard Mandarin
- Hanyu Pinyin: Píngshānwéi
Yue: Cantonese
- Yale Romanization: Pìhngsāanwài
- Jyutping: Ping4 Saan1 Wai4

General information
- Location: Intersection of Pingshan Boulevard and Shenxian Road; Pingshan Subdistrict, Pingshan District, Shenzhen, Guangdong; China
- Coordinates: 22°41′38.33″N 114°20′19.50″E
- Operated by: SZMC (Shenzhen Metro Group)
- Lines: Line 14; Line 16
- Platforms: 4 (2 island platforms)
- Tracks: 4

Construction
- Structure type: Underground
- Accessible: Yes

History
- Opened: October 28, 2022; 2 years ago (Line 14); December 28, 2022; 2 years ago (Line 16)

Services
Preceding station	Shenzhen Metro	Following station
Jinlong towards Gangxia North	Line 14	Pingshan Square towards Shatian
Liuhe towards Yuanshan Xikeng	Line 16	Pinghuan towards Tianxin
Location

Pingshanwei station (simplified Chinese: 坪山围站; traditional Chinese: 坪山圍站; pinyin: Píngshānwéi Zhàn; Cantonese Yale: Pìhngsāanwài Jaahm) is an interchange station for Line 14 and Line 16 of the Shenzhen Metro. It is located in Pingshan District. Line 14 platforms is opened on 28 October 2022 and Line 16 platforms opened on 28 December 2022.

== History ==
In July 2017, the National Development and Reform Commission of the People's Republic of China approved the Fourth Phase Construction Plan of Shenzhen Urban Rail Transit (2017-2022). Shenzhen Metro Line 14 and Shenzhen Metro Line 16 were approved for construction, of which Pingshanwei Station is a transfer station for two lines.

In December 2018, the station floor of Pingshanwei Station Line 16 entered the main structure construction stage.

On 15 May 2020, the diaphragm wall of the main enclosure structure of Pingshanwei Line 16 station floor was completed.

In May 2021, the main structure of the station floor of Line 14 and Line 16 of Pingshanwei Station will be capped.

On 22 April 2022, Shenzhen Municipal People's Government approved the Plan for Station Names of Relevant Lines of Shenzhen Rail Transit Phase IV, and the station was named 'Pingshanwei Station'. In September, Pingshanwei Station passed the fire acceptance. On October 28, Pingshanwei Station was put into operation with the opening of Shenzhen Metro Line 14 Phase I Project.

On 28 October 2022, the station was opened together with Shenzhen Metro Line 14.

On 28 December 2022, Line 16 station opened.

== Station layout ==
G	-	Exit
B1F; Concourse	Lobby	Ticket Machines, Customer Service, Automatic Vending Machines
B2F; Platforms	Platform	14 towards Gangxia North (Jinlong)
B2F; Platforms	Island platform, doors will open on the left
B2F; Platforms	Platform	14 towards Shatian (Pingshan Square)
B3F; Platforms	Platform	16 towards Yuanshan Xikeng (Liuhe)
B3F; Platforms	Island platform, doors will open on the left
B3F; Platforms	Platform	16 towards Tianxin (Pinghuan)

== Exits ==
Pingshanwei station has eight exits. Before Line 16 opened, the station only opened Exit A and Exit B.

Exits	Picture of exit	Picture of elevator	Destination
		No picture	East side of Pingshan Boulevard (S), Pingshan Park，Pingshan Bus Terminal
		No picture	East side of Pingshan Boulevard (N), Pingshan Sub-district Office
		No picture	Pingshan Boulevard (W), Shenchengtou Midtown Garden
		No picture	Pingshan Boulevard (W), Pingshan Yuanding Road
E1		No picture	Shenxian Road (S)
E2		No picture	Shenxian Road (S)
		No picture	Shenxian Road (S)
		No picture	Shenxian Road (S)
		No picture	Pingshan Liulian Primary School

== Gallery ==
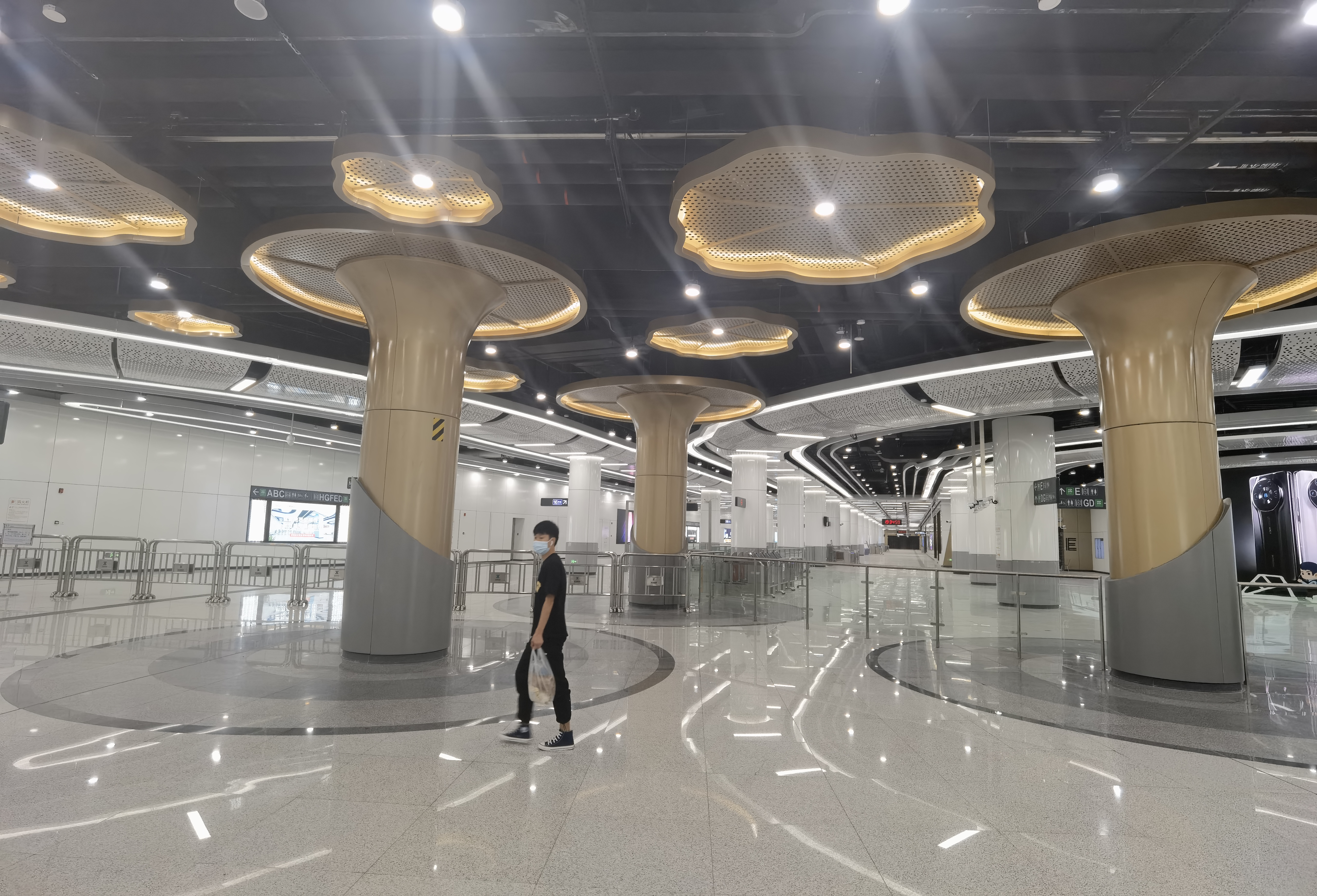
Concourse

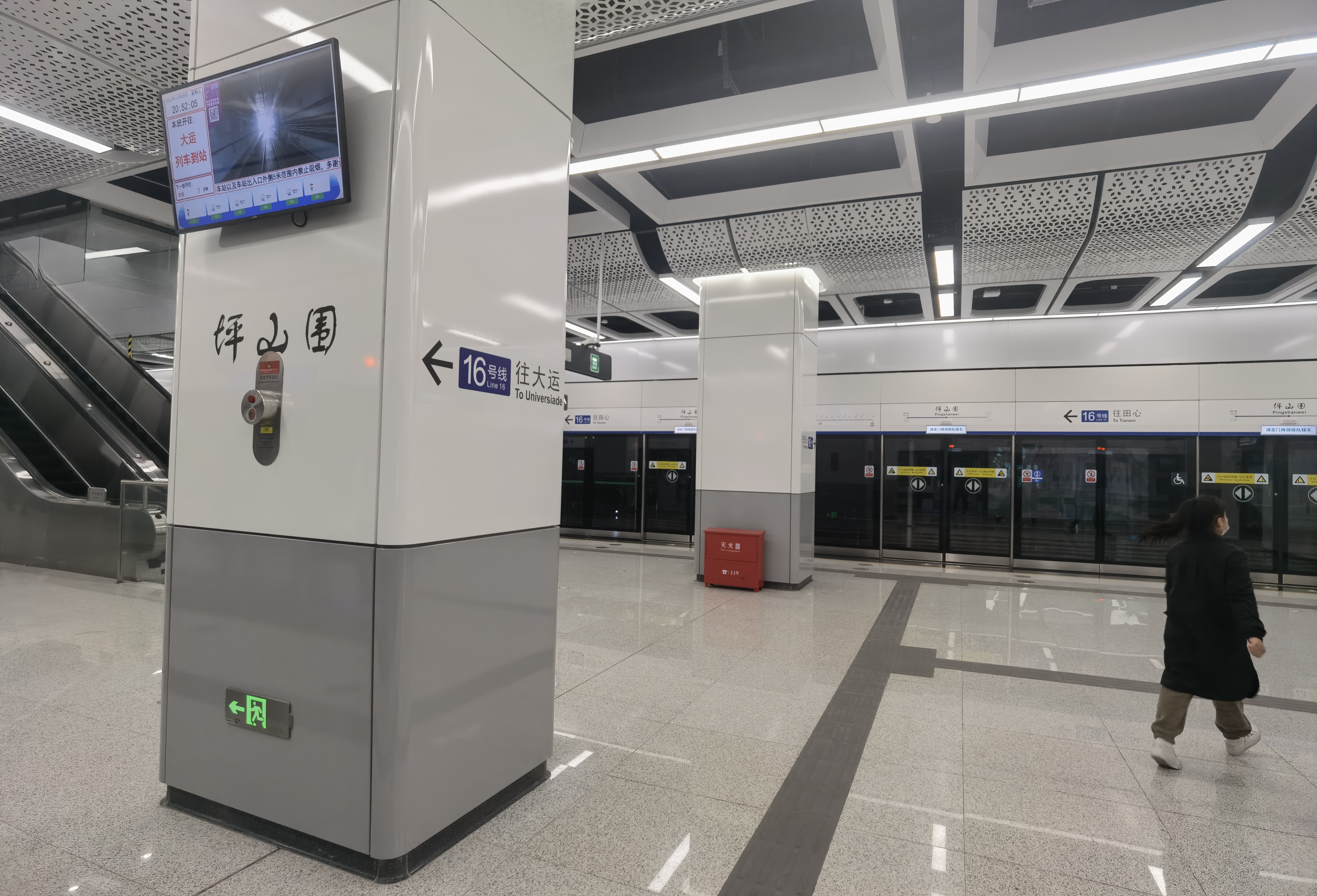
Line 16 platforms

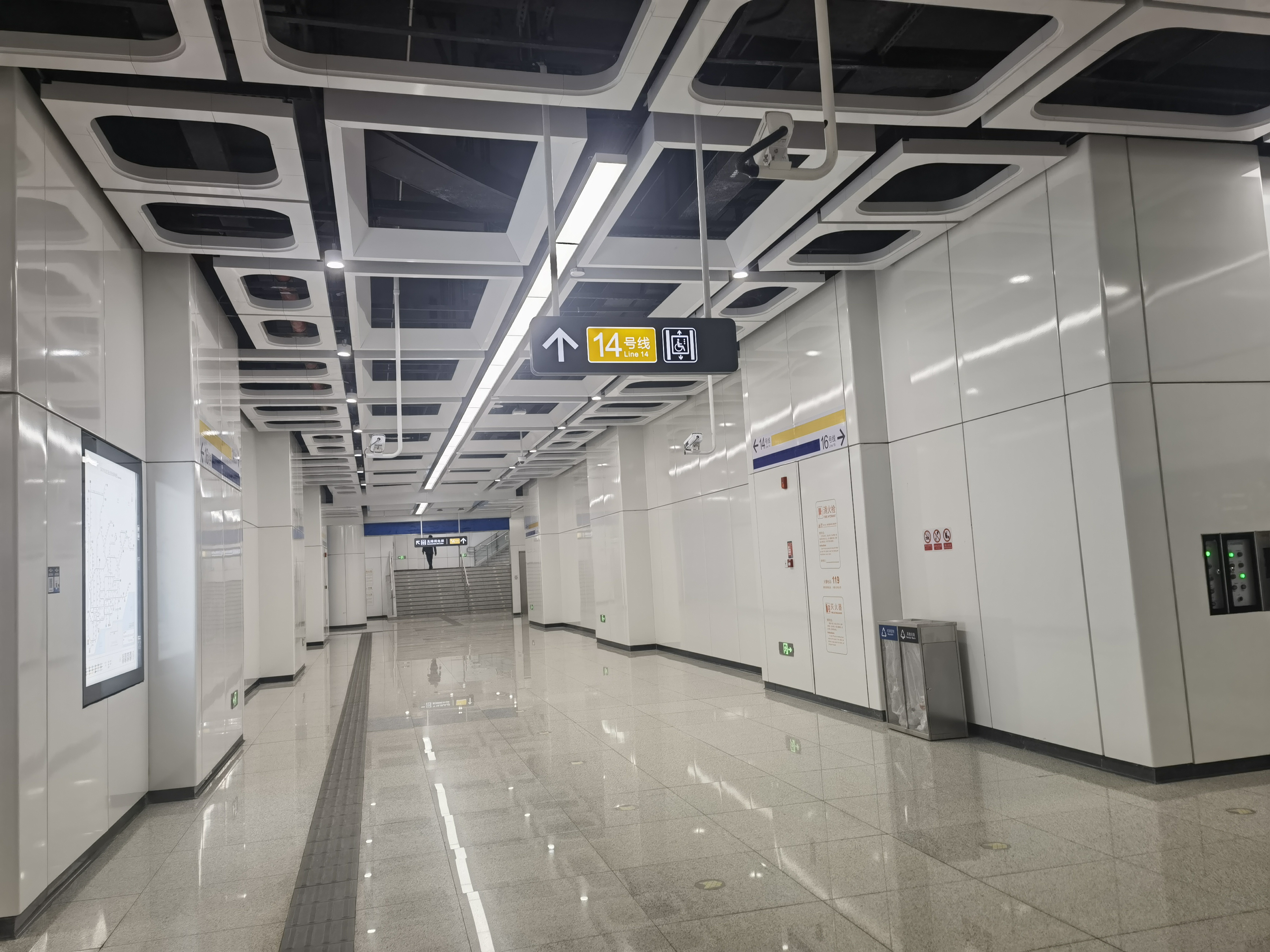
Transfer passageway
