= Pingshan Square station =

Metro station in Shenzhen, Guangdong, China

Pingshan Square 坪山广场
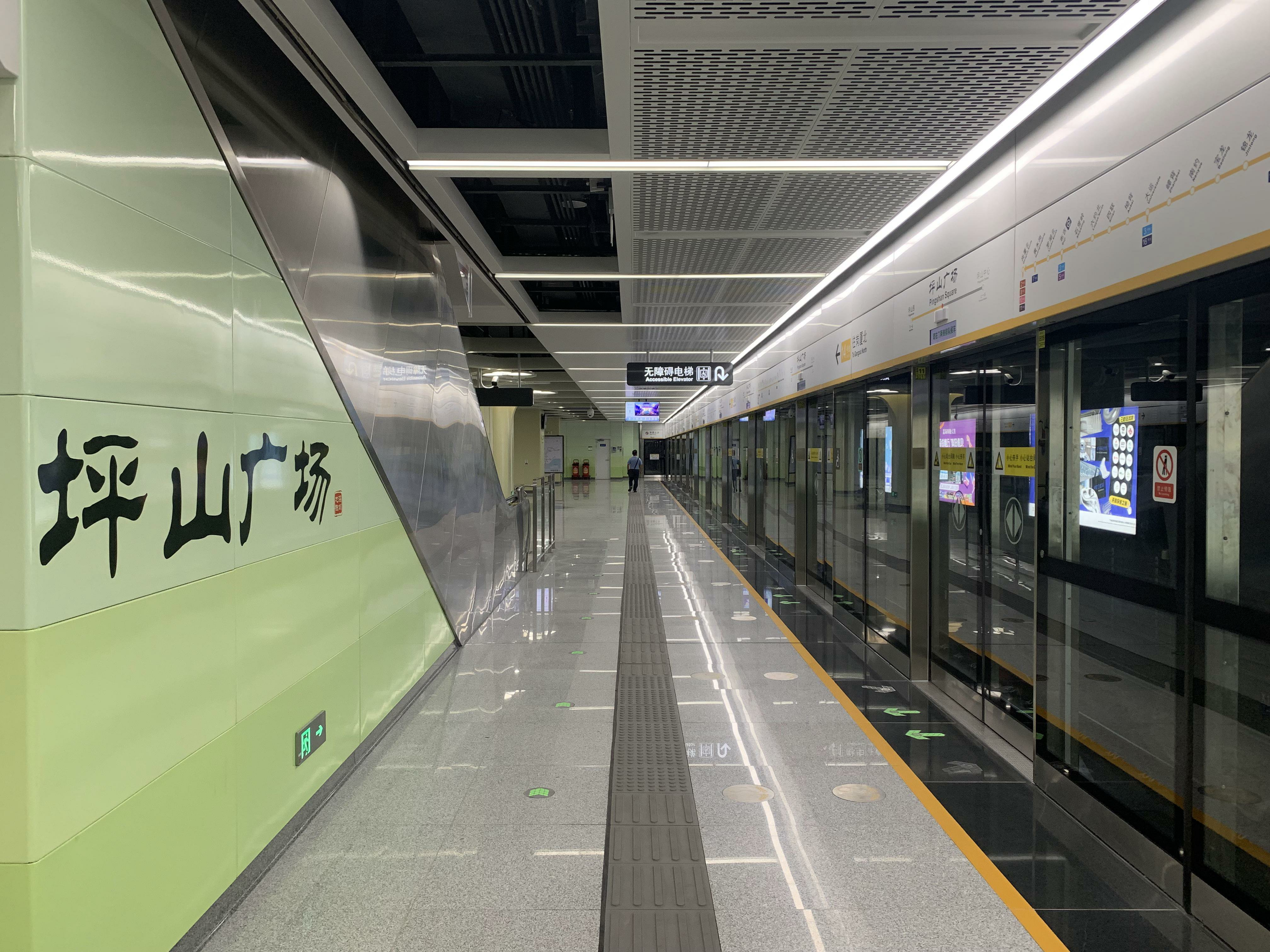
- Platform in October 2022

General information
- Location: Shenzhen, Guangdong; China
- Coordinates: 22.7033°N 114.3437°E
- Operated by: SZMC (Shenzhen Metro Group)
- Line(s): Line 14
- Platforms: 2 (1 island platform)
- Tracks: 2

Construction
- Structure type: Underground
- Accessible: Yes

History
- Opened: 28 October 2022

Services
Preceding station	Shenzhen Metro	Following station
Pingshanwei towards Gangxia North	Line 14	Pingshan Center towards Shatian

Pingshan Square station (Chinese: 坪山广场站; pinyin: Píngshān Guǎngchǎng Zhàn) is a station on Line 14 of Shenzhen Metro in Shenzhen, Guangdong, China, which is opened on 28 October 2022. It is located in Pingshan District.

== Station layout ==
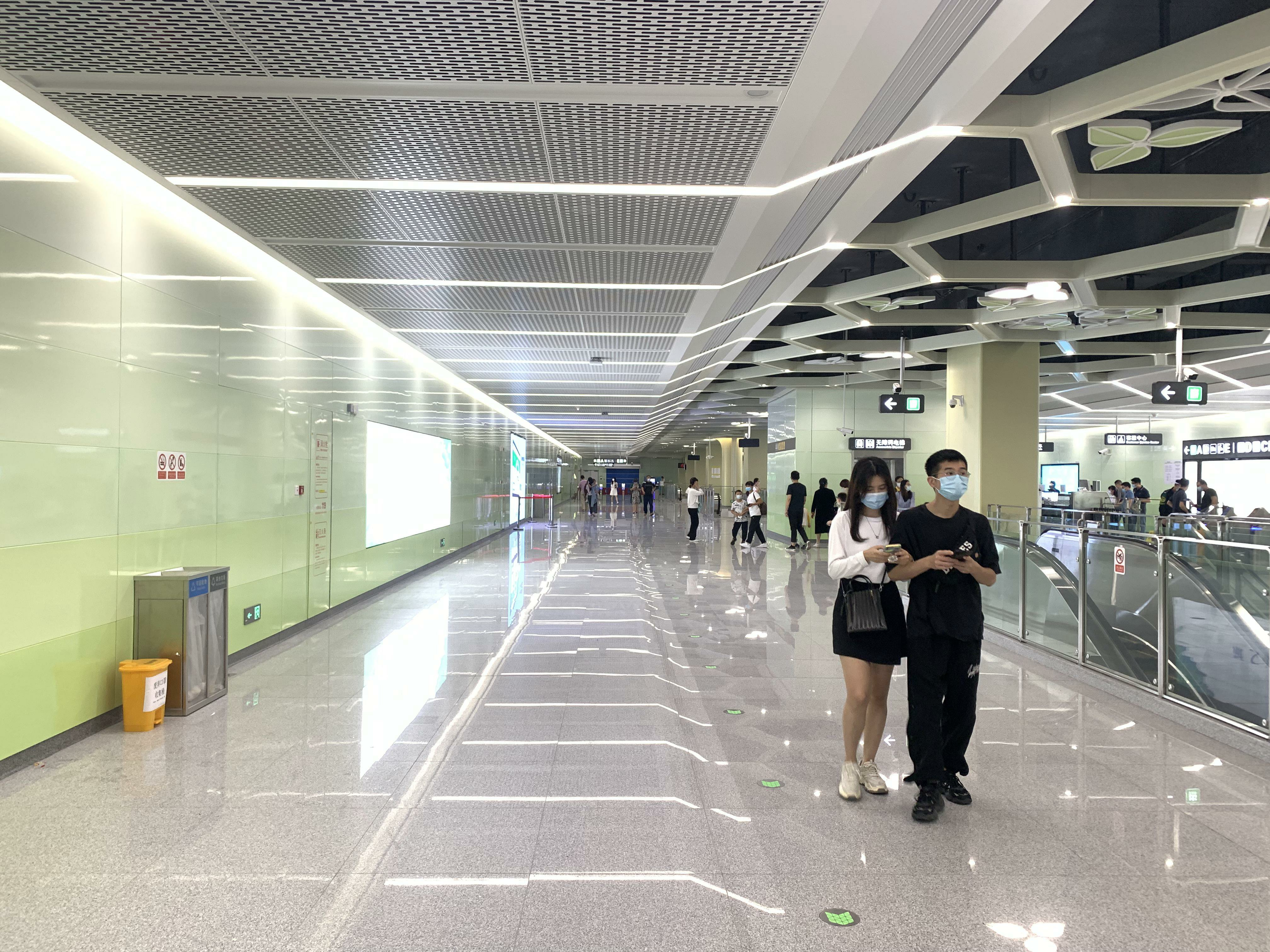
Station concourse

G	-	Exit
B1F; Concourse	Lobby	Customer Service, Shops, Vending machines, ATMs
B2F; Platforms	Platform	14 towards Gangxia North (Pingshanwei)
B2F; Platforms	Island platform, doors will open on the left
B2F; Platforms	Platform	14 towards Shatian (Pingshan Center)

== Exits ==
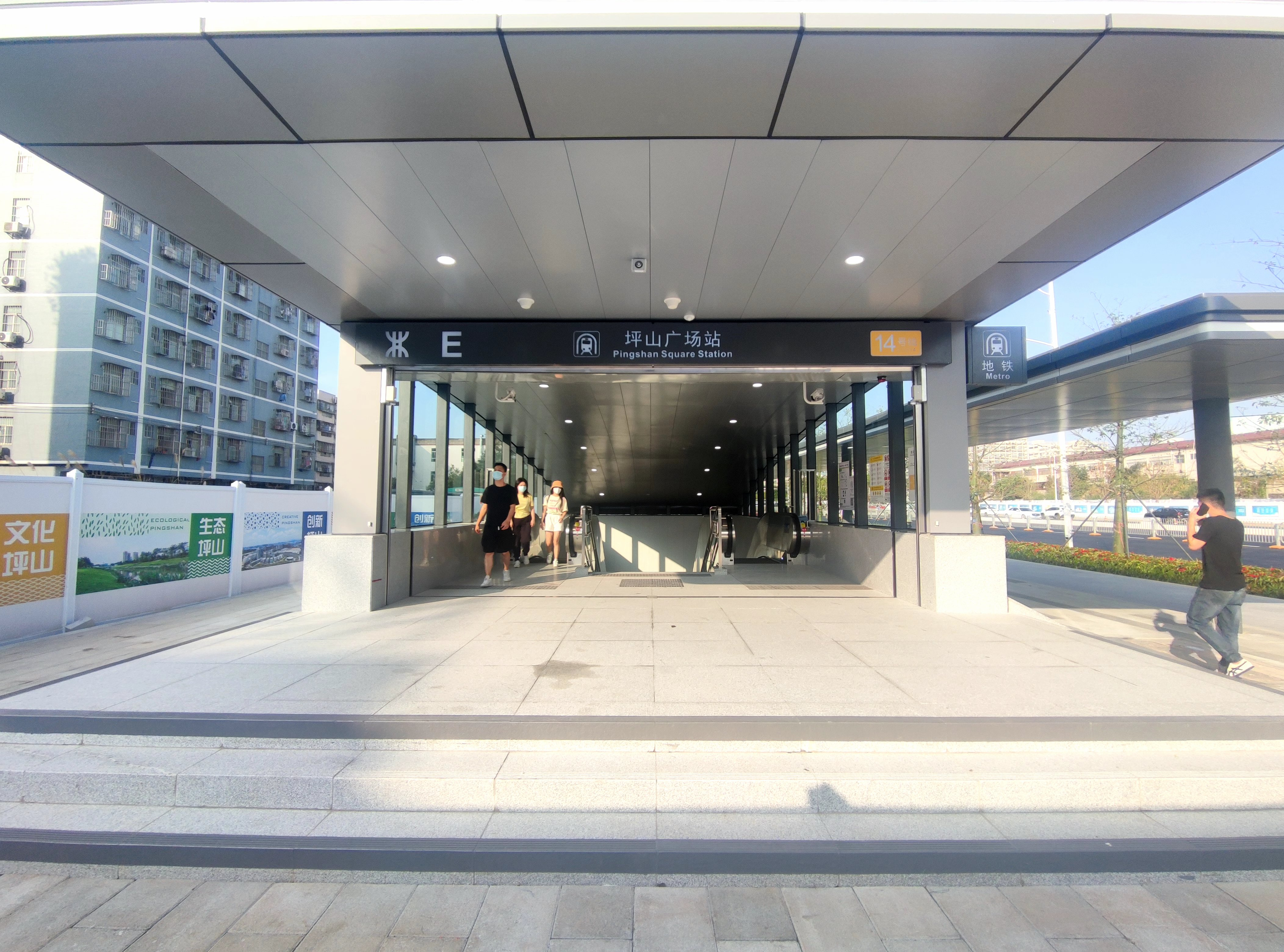
Exit E

Exit		Destination
Exit A		East side of Pingshan Blvd (S)
Exit B		East side of Pingshan Blvd (N), Pingshan SkyShuttle Future City station [zh]
Exit C	C1	South of Pinghui Road, Pingshan Public Security Bureau, Pingshan SkyShuttle Future City station
Exit C	C2	North side of Pinghui Road, Pingshan Administration Bureau, Shenzhen Municipal Bureau of Planning and Natural Resources
Exit D	D1	South side of He'an Road, Pingshan District Central Square
Exit D	D2	North side of He'an Road
Exit E		West side of Pingshan Blvd, Zhengshanjia Village
