= Pingshan Center station =

Metro station in Shenzhen, Guangdong, China

Pingshan Center 坪山中心
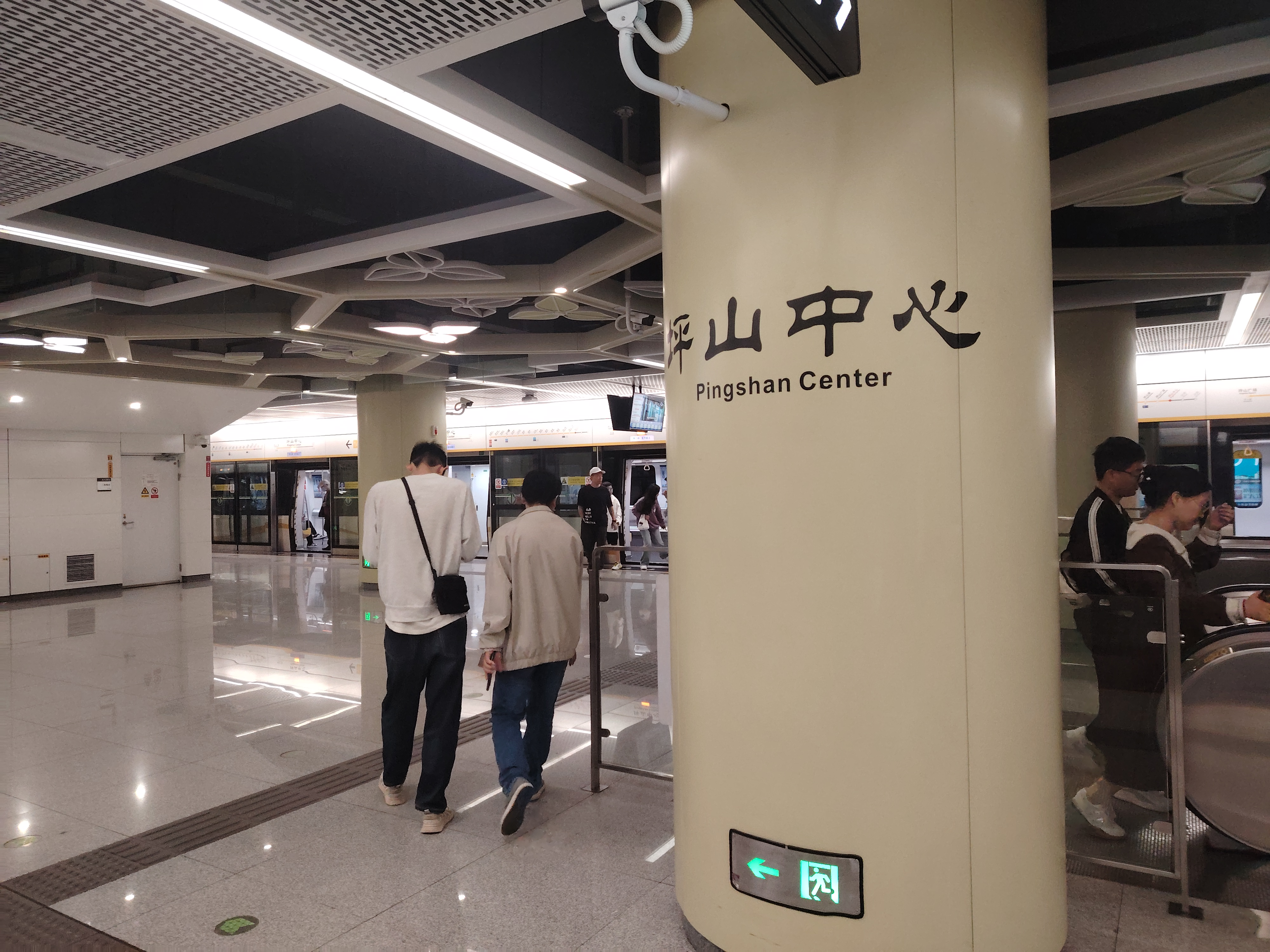
- Platforms

General information
- Location: Pingshan District, Shenzhen, Guangdong; China
- Coordinates: 22.70979°N 114.34672°E
- Operated by: SZMC (Shenzhen Metro Group)
- Line: Line 14
- Platforms: 2 (1 island platform)
- Tracks: 2

Construction
- Structure type: Underground
- Accessible: Yes

History
- Opened: 28 October 2022

Services
| Preceding station | Shenzhen Metro | Following station |
|---|---|---|
| Pingshan Square towards Gangxia North | Line 14 | Kengzi towards Shatian |
Location

Pingshan Center station (Chinese: 坪山中心站; pinyin: Píngshān Zhōngxīn Zhàn) is a station on Line 14 of Shenzhen Metro in Shenzhen, Guangdong, China, which is opened on 28 October 2022. It is located in Pingshan District.

The station is in central Pingshan District, Shenzhen. It is near the Pingshan District Government, Pingshan District Central Park (坪山区中心公园), and Pingshan District Experimental School (坪山区实验学校).

It is near the station of the same name [zh] on the Line 1 of Pingshan SkyShuttle, and is used for transferring to and from the SkyShuttle.

== History ==
In March 2018, Shenzhen Metro Group Co., Ltd. released the Environmental Impact Report of Shenzhen Urban Rail Transit Line 14 Project, which includes this station. The construction name is Zhuyangkeng station (Chinese: 朱洋坑站; pinyin: Zhūyángkēng Zhàn).

On April 22, 2022, Shenzhen Municipal Bureau of Planning and Natural Resources issued the Announcement on the Approval Scheme of Shenzhen Rail Transit Phase IV Station Name Plan, in which the station name change to Pingshan Center station. The reason is that the station is located in the central area of Pingshan District.

On October 28, 2022, the station was opened together with Shenzhen Metro Line 14.

== Station layout ==
| G | - | Exit |
| B1F; Concourse | Lobby | Customer Service, Shops, Vending machines, ATMs |
| B2F; Platforms | Platform | 14 towards Gangxia North (Pingshan Square) |
| B2F; Platforms | Island platform, doors will open on the left |
| B2F; Platforms | Platform | 14 towards Shatian (Kengzi) |

== Exits ==
Pingshan Center station has four exits, of which Exit A and C are equipped with elevators and Exit C is equipped with toilets.

| Exits | Picture of exit | Picture of elevator | Destination |
|---|---|---|---|
| | | | East side of Pingshan Blvd (S), South Side of Lanzhu West Road |
| | | Not applicable | East side of Pingshan Blvd (N) |
| | | | West side of Pingshan Blvd (N), Shenzhen Pingshan District People's Government, Shenzhen Sports Center of Large Industrial Zone, Shenzhen Pingshan District Central Park |
| | | Not applicable | West side of Pingshan Blvd (S) |
