= Line 14 (Shenzhen Metro) =

Metro line in Shenzhen, China

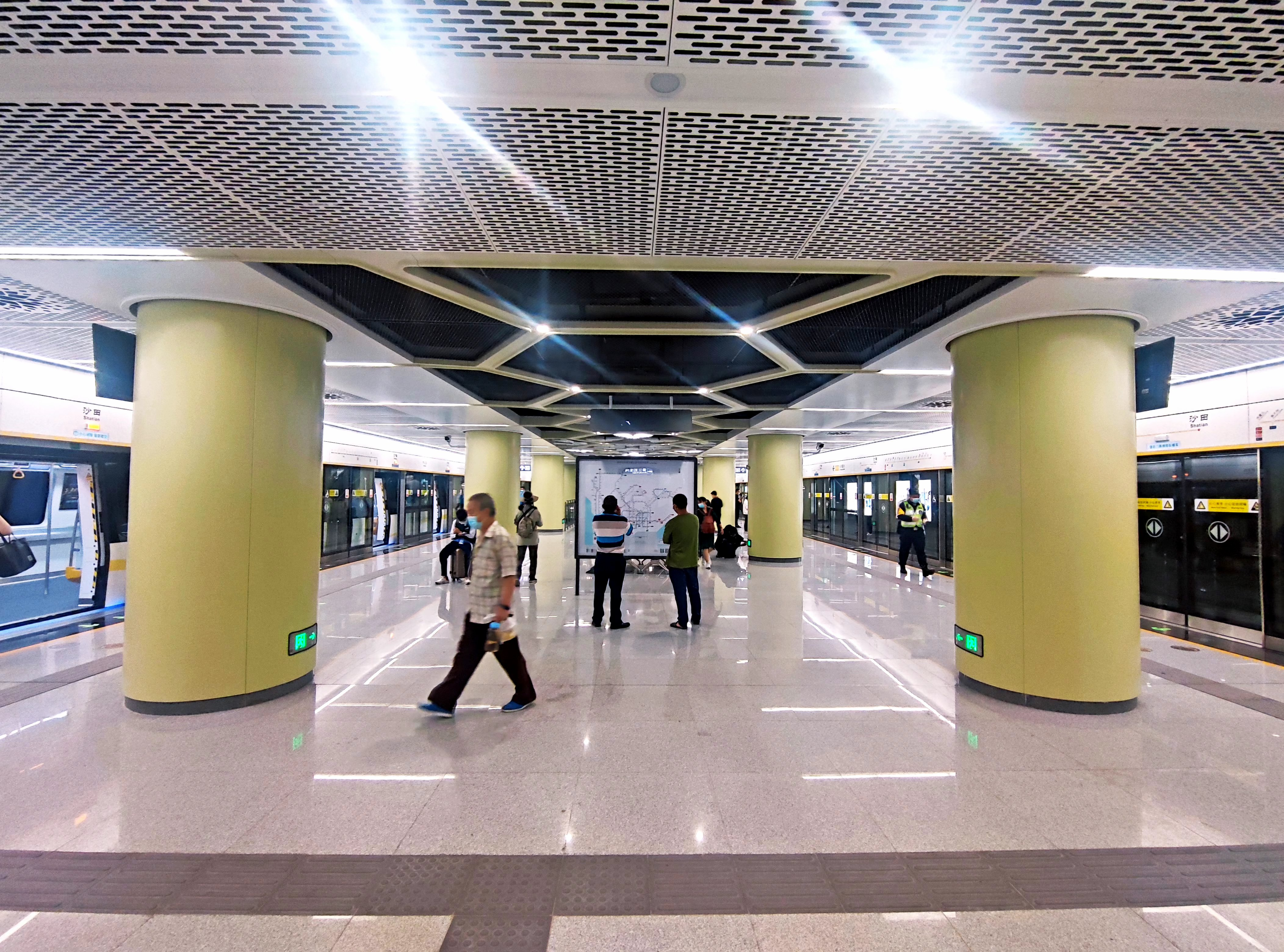
- Shatian station

Overview
- Other names: Eastern Express Line (东部快线; 東部快線; Dōngbù Kuàixiàn; Dung1 Bou6 Faai3 Sin3)
- Status: In operation
- Locale: Shenzhen, Guangdong, China
- Termini: Gangxia North; Shatian
- Stations: 18
- Color on map: Gold (#f2c75c)

Service
- Type: Rapid transit
- System: Shenzhen Metro
- Services: 1
- Operator(s): SZMC (Shenzhen Metro Group)
- Depot(s): Ang'e Depot; Fuxin Stabling Yard
- Rolling stock: CRRC Changchun (1401–1444)

History
- Opened: 28 October 2022; 3 years ago

Technical
- Line length: 50.34 km (31.28 mi)
- Number of tracks: Double-track
- Character: Underground
- Track gauge: 1,435 mm (4 ft 8 1/2 in) standard gauge
- Electrification: 1,500 V DC (overhead lines)
- Operating speed: 120 km/h (75 mph)
- Signalling: CBTC

Line 14 of the Shenzhen Metro is a rapid transit line in Shenzhen. It runs southwest–northeast from Gangxia North in Futian District to Shatian in Pingshan District. Line 14 is envisioned as an urban express line with higher operating top speeds and wider stop spacings, additionally Line 14 serves as the relief line to the congested Line 3. The line is equipped with automatic train operation using high capacity 8 car type A trains. To improve journey times a number of express and direct express runs (which only run bound for Gangxia North in the AM peak) were introduced in December 2022.

== Opening timeline ==
Segment	Commencement	Length	Station(s)	Name
Gangxia North — Shatian	28 October 2022	50.34 km (31.28 mi)	18	Initial phase

== Stations ==
Service Route			Station name		Connections	Nearby bus stops	Distance km		Location
L	D	E	English	Chinese	Connections	Nearby bus stops	Distance km		Location
●	●	●	Gangxia North	岗厦北	2 8 10 11	101 113 204 223 303 320 326 M102 M103 M106 M133 M190 M447 M448 Peak-express 47（高快47）Peak-express 60（高快60）Peak-time 3（高峰3）Peak-time 49（高峰49）Peak-time 119（高峰119）Peak-time 221（高峰221）	0.0	0.0	Futian
●	●	●	Huangmugang	黄木岗	7	11 12 58 111 216 222 323 E5 E11 M194 M202 M203 M207 M213 M224 M329 M401 M417 M453 M454 M588	2.8	2.8	Futian
●	↑	▲	Luohu North	罗湖北	17; Luohu North (U/C)	M140 M482	4.0	6.8	Luohu
●	●	●	Buji	布吉	3 5 BJQ	8 85 321 322 357 366 371 376 977 980 M139 M172 M183 M192 M194 M224 M239 M244 M265 M267 M271 M272 M273 M283 M295 M311 M329 M358 M403 M404 M406 M408 M414 M415 M485 M541 M588 M589 Wutong-Hill 2（梧桐山2）	2.8	9.6	Longgang
●	↑	●	Shiyaling	石芽岭	17	322 977 B741 M150 M192 M203 M224 M227 M273 M281 M300 M301 M311 M324 M329 M363 M402 M403 M404 M491 M508 M547 M565 M589 Peak-time 183（高峰183）	3.6	13.2	Longgang
●	↑	●	Liuyue North	六约北		8 61 979 M190 M229 M266 M324 Peak-time 29（高峰29）Dameisha-holiday 2（大梅沙假日2）	4.3	17.5	Longgang
●	↑	●	Silian	四联		906 B916 M208 M229 M466 M563 M570 Dongguan 781（莞781）	2.2	19.7	Longgang
●	↑	▲	Aobei	坳背		Anliang 930（930安良线）	3.2	22.9	Longgang
●	●	●	Universiade	大运	3 16	351 358 Express-358 833 923 E23 E33 E34 M219 M229 M239 M266 M294 M303 M317 M318 M322 M357 M359 M360 M396 M446 M547 M593 Peak-time 146（高峰146）Peak-time 957（高峰957）Dongguan 786（莞786）	2.7	25.6	Longgang
●	↑	|	Zhangbei	嶂背		B867	3.2	28.8	Longgang
●	↑	●	Nanyue	南约		B910 B912 B913 M220 M303 M308 M322 M357 M394 M447 M458 M466 M304-clockwise（304顺时针）M546-clockwise（546顺时针）	3.1	31.9	Longgang
●	↑	|	Baolong	宝龙		B922 M220 M308 M317 M322 M447 M458 M546-clockwise（546顺时针）	2.1	34.0	Longgang
●	↑	●	Jinlong	锦龙	19	366 833 941 A5 B678 M143 M220 M288 M294 M295 M325 M326 M439 M447 M480 M546-clockwise（546顺时针）M546-anticlockwise（546逆时针）Pingmei-holiday-express（坪梅假日快线）	4.4	38.4	Pingshan
●	↑	●	Pingshanwei	坪山围	16	366 833 915 941 963 964 978 B760 E22 M136 M277 M288 M295 M296 M325 M326 M361 M434 M439 M443 M479 M564 M575 M546-clockwise（546顺时针）M546-anticlockwise（546逆时针）	1.6	40.0	Pingshan
●	↑	|	Pingshan Square	坪山广场		366 833 915 941 963 964 939A 939B 978 B760 B923 B935 E22 E34 M288 M295 M296 M325 M326 M361 M434 M439 M440 M443 M479 M497 M575 Pingmei-holiday-express（坪梅假日快线）	1.2	41.2	Pingshan
●	↑	|	Pingshan Center	坪山中心	19 Pingshan SkyShuttle Line 1	366 978 B935 E34 M136 M325 M326 M361 M422 M434 M478	1.1	42.3	Pingshan
●	↑	|	Kengzi	坑梓		366 978 B675 B938 B950 E22 E34 M136 M293 M295 M297 M361 M384 M396 M427 M434 M478	4.6	46.9	Pingshan
●	●	●	Shatian	沙田		B761 B961 E34 M136 M187 M361 M427 M434 M478 M571 Peak-time 151（高峰151）Dayawan 266（大亚湾266）Dayawan 268（大亚湾268）Huiyang 7（惠阳7）Huiyang 163（惠阳163）Huiyang 168B（惠阳168B）Shenhui 2（深惠7）Shenhui 2-branch（深惠2支）	3.4	50.3	Pingshan

== Future extension ==
A future extension to Xiangmihu West is still under planning. It will be located one stop beyond Gangxia North.

Station name		Connections	Location
English	Chinese	Connections	Location
Xiangmihu West	香蜜湖西	20 22	Futian

== Rolling stock ==
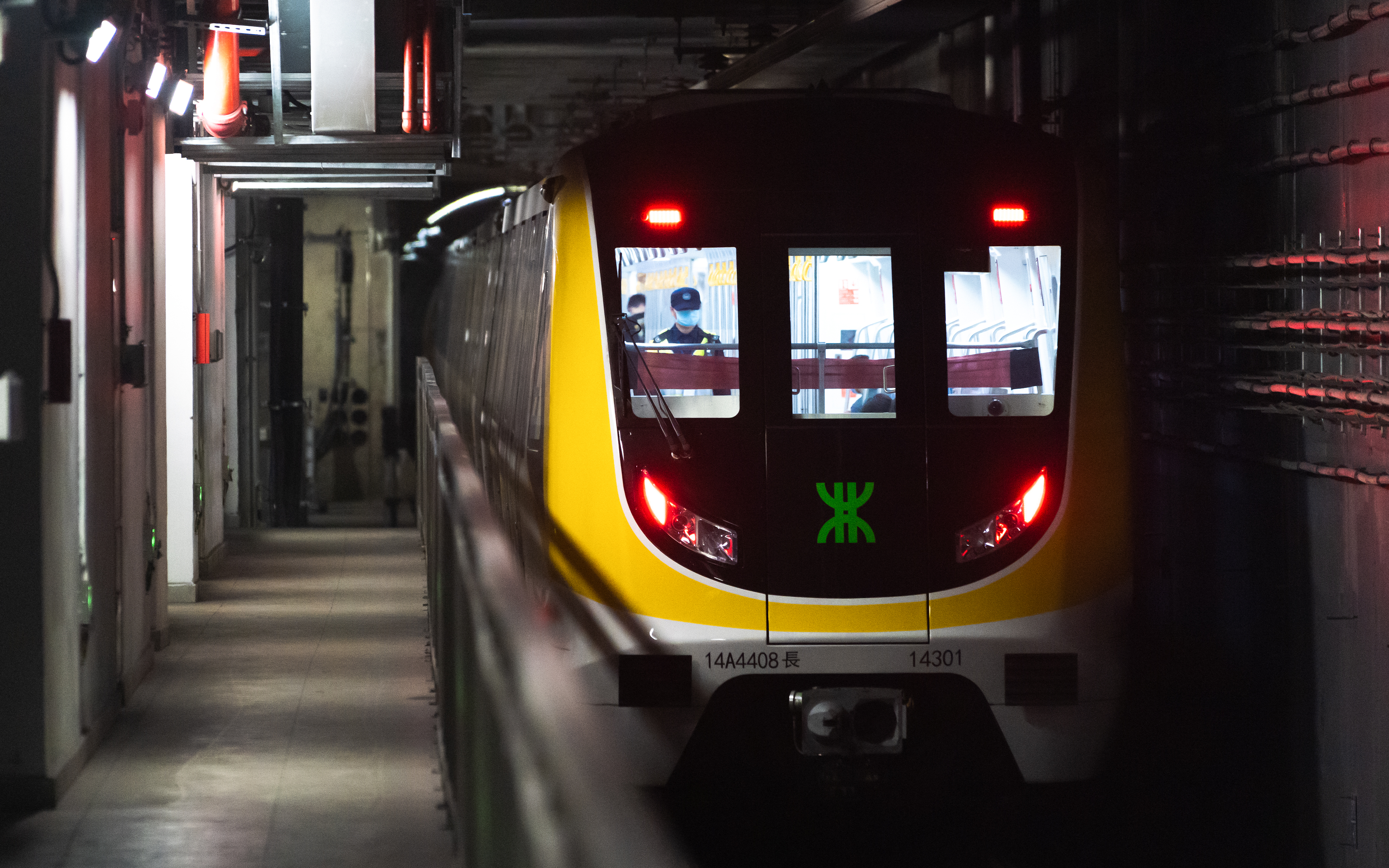
Line 14 train

Line 14 will use 44 sets of Size A subway trains in eight car sets (no. 1401–1444) with a maximum speed of 120 km/h (75 mph). Line 14 use automatic train operation with GoA4 construction standard.

Type	Date of manufacture	Series	Sets	Serial number	Assembly	Notes
Type A	2020 - 2021	A-size stock	44	1401-1444	Tc+Mp+M+Mp+M+M+Mp+Tc	Manufactured by CRRC Changchun Railway Vehicles
