= Kengzi station =

Metro station in Shenzhen, Guangdong, China

Kengzi 坑梓
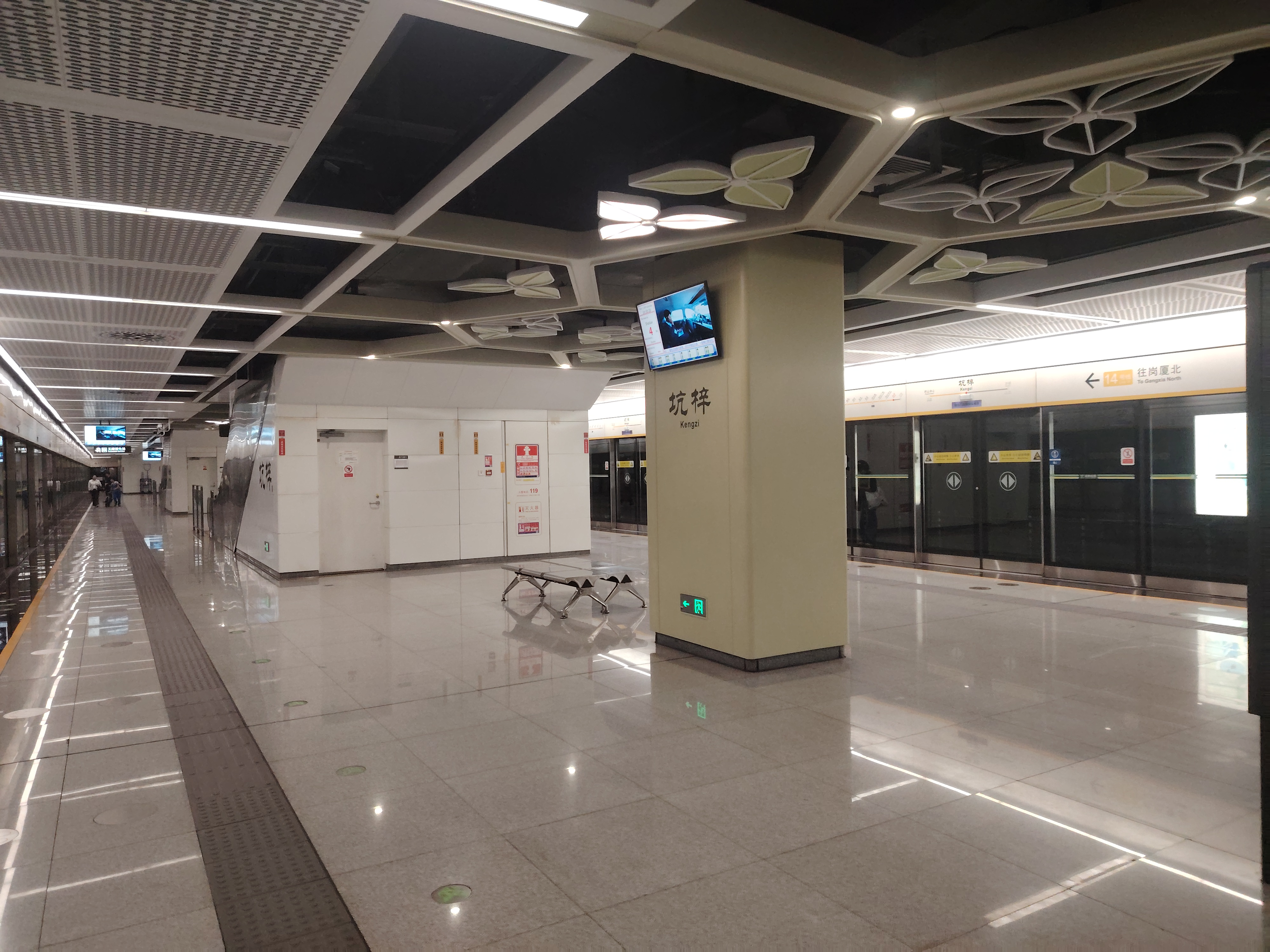
- Platforms

General information
- Location: Kengzi Subdistrict, Pingshan District, Shenzhen, Guangdong; China
- Coordinates: 22.74795°N 114.36606°E
- Operated by: SZMC (Shenzhen Metro Group)
- Line: Line 14
- Platforms: 2 (1 island platform)
- Tracks: 2

Construction
- Structure type: Underground
- Accessible: Yes

History
- Opened: 28 October 2022

Services
Preceding station	Shenzhen Metro	Following station
Pingshan Center towards Gangxia North	Line 14	Shatian Terminus
Location

Kengzi station (Chinese: 坑梓站; pinyin: Kēngzǐ Zhàn) is a station on Line 14 of Shenzhen Metro in Shenzhen, Guangdong, China, which is opened on 28 October 2022. It is located at the east of the intersection of Pingshan Avenue and Guangzu North Road, Kengzi Subdistrict, Pingshan District. The station lies east-west along Pingshan Avenue.

== History ==
In March 2018, Shenzhen Metro Group Co., Ltd. released the Environmental Impact Report of Shenzhen Urban Rail Transit Line 14 Project, which includes this station.

On April 22, 2022, Shenzhen Municipal Bureau of Planning and Natural Resources issued the Announcement on the Approval Scheme of Shenzhen Rail Transit Phase IV Station Name Plan, in which the station will continue to use the name, Kengzi Station.

The station's main structure was topped out on 28 August 2020, making it the fourth station on Shenzhen Metro Line 14 to be topped out.

On October 28, 2022, the station was opened together with Shenzhen Metro Line 14.

== Station layout ==
The station has an area of 17,312 square meters.

G	-	Exit
B1F; Concourse	Lobby	Customer Service, Shops, Vending machines, ATMs
B2F; Platforms	Platform	14 towards Gangxia North (Pingshan Center)
B2F; Platforms	Island platform, doors will open on the left
B2F; Platforms	Platform	14 towards Shatian (Terminus)

== Exits ==
Kengzi station has four exits, of which Exit A and C are equipped with elevators and Exit C is equipped with toilets.

Exits	Picture of exit	Picture of elevator	Destination
			South side of Pingshan Blvd (W), East side of Guangzu North Road, Pingshan District Kengzi Sub-district Office, Pingshan District Guangzu Middle School
		Not applicable	South side of Pingshan Blvd (E), West side of Zixing Road, Jintian Fenghuayuan
			North side of Pingshan Blvd (E), Longtian House
		Not applicable	North side of Pingshan Blvd (W), East side of Longxing South Road, Pingshan District Maternity & Child Healthcare Hospital

== Location ==
The station is on Pingshan Avenue, Pingshan District, Shenzhen. It is near Guangzu Middle School (光祖中学), Kengzi Central Primary School (坑梓中心小学), Pingshan District Maternal and Child Hospital (坪山区妇幼保健院), and Pingle Bone Trauma Hospital (平乐骨伤科医院).
