= Line 1 (Pingshan SkyShuttle) =

Tram Line in Shenzhen, China

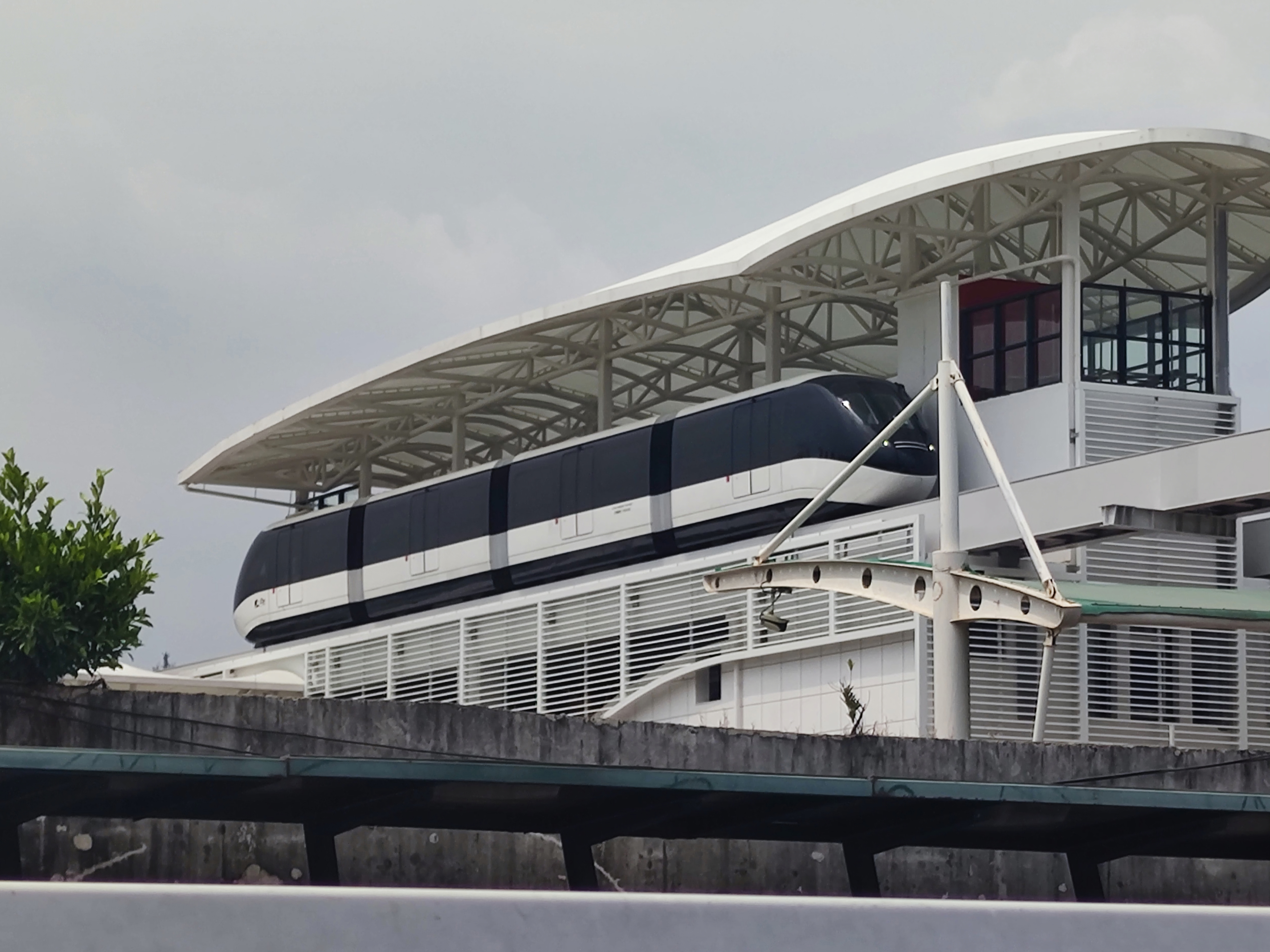

Overview
- Native name: 坪山云巴1号线
- Owner: BYD
- Locale: Pingshan, Shenzhen, China
- Transit type: Elevated Tram
- Number of lines: 1
- Line number: 1
- Number of stations: 11

Operation
- Began operation: 28 December 2022

Technical
- System length: 8.51 kilometres (5.29 mi)

Line 1 of the Pingshan SkyShuttle is an elevated BYD SkyShuttle automated guideway transit line serving the district of Pingshan, Shenzhen. Line 1 opened on 28 December 2022 and runs from Pingshan Station to BYD North Station.

== Stations ==
Service routes	Station name		Connections	Distance km	Location
Service routes	English	Chinese	Connections	Distance km	
●	Pingshan High-Speed Rail Station	坪山高铁站	16 Pingshan Station Shenzhen Pingshan railway station	0.00	Pingshan
●	Zhanqian Road East	站前路东		1.42	Pingshan
●	Culture Center	文化聚落		1.91	Pingshan
●	Pingshan Center	坪山中心	14 Pingshan Center	2.61	Pingshan
●	Zhongxinguoji	中芯国际		3.12	Pingshan
●	Bonded Area	综合保税区		3.85	Pingshan
●	Yanziling	燕子岭		4.73	Pingshan
●	Future City	未来城		6.96	Pingshan
●	Natural History Museum West	自然博物馆西		2.65	Pingshan
●	Longbei	龙背	16 Dongjiang Column Memorial Hall	7.50	Pingshan
●	BYD North	比亚迪北		8.51	Pingshan
