= Changhong Technology =

Plastics company in China

- Company type: public
- Traded as: SZSE: 300151
- Industry: Injection molding
- Founded: 1987; 39 years ago
- Founders: Li Huanchang (李焕昌); Hua Shoufu (华守夫); Xu Yanping (徐燕平)
- Headquarters: Pingshan District, Shenzhen, China
- Area served: Worldwide
- Key people: Li Huanchang 李焕昌 (Chairman); Zhou Guoquan 周国铨 (Financial Controller); Tan Longquan 谭龙泉 (G.M.); Wang Yunfang 王云芳 (V.G.M.)
- Revenue: ▲CNY 351,328,000 (2012)
- Number of employees: ▲2,100 (2012)
- Subsidiaries: Shanghai Changmei Precision Moulds; Shuochang (Shanghai) Precision Molding; Heyuan Changhong Precision Machinery Technology; Shenzhen Boomingshing Medical Device; Changhong Technology (Hong Kong); Wuhu Changhong Technology
- Website: www.sz-changhong.com

Shenzhen Changhong Technology Co., Ltd.
- Traditional Chinese: 深圳市昌紅科技股份有限公司
- Simplified Chinese: 深圳市昌红科技股份有限公司
- Literal meaning: Shenzhen Changhong Technology Co., Ltd.
Transcriptions
Standard Mandarin
- Hanyu Pinyin: Shēnzhèn shì chāng hóng kējì gǔfèn yǒuxiàn gōngsī

Shenzhen Changhong Technology Co., Ltd. (simplified Chinese: 深圳市昌红科技股份有限公司; traditional Chinese: 深圳市昌紅科技股份有限公司) is a Chinese plastic parts and injection mold-maker. It was listed on the Shenzhen Stock Exchange ChiNext board on 22 December 2010 using stock code SZSE: 300151 with CN¥100,500,000 registered capital. The "CHT Group" has subsidiaries in Shenzhen, Shanghai, Heyuan, Anhui, and Hong Kong with their headquarters in Pingshan New District, Shenzhen, Guangdong, China.

Major customers include Konica Minolta Inc., Brother Industries, for whom they produce tooling and parts for Multifunction Printers, Thermo Fisher and Beijing Xiaomi Technology Co., Ltd.

As of 9 November 2016, Changhong Technology was a constituent of SZSE 1000 Index (as well as sub-index SZSE 700 Index) but not in SZSE Component Index, making the company to be ranked between the 501st to 1,000th by free float adjusted market capitalization.

Changhong acquired 79.75% of Lingen Precision Medical Products (Shanghai) Co. (Chinese: 力因精准医疗产品（上海）有限公司) for ¥67.79 million (US$10,510,078) in 2015. In 2018, the company decided not to seek compensation from Lingen founder Zhu Dexin (Chinese: 朱德新), citing his illness, despite Lingen's failure to meet revenue targets. The decision attracted criticism from shareholders and scrutiny from regulators.

== Ownership ==
The public listing was funded in cash with 49.91% being paid by the company Chairman Li Huanchang (李焕昌). Heyuan subsidiary General Manager Hua Shoufu (华守夫) paid 7.86% and Shanghai subsidiary General Manager Xu Yanping (徐燕平) contributed 5.99% of the investment.

Additional investors include the Shenzhen Zhongke Hongyi Venture Investment Co., Ltd. - 深圳市中科宏易创业投资有限公司 (3.73%), Zhejiang Lianheng Venture Capital Co., Ltd. - 浙江联盛创业投资有限公司 (3.73%) and Deng Shiyan - 邓世珩 (1.05%). The remaining 27.73% was raised from numerous other sources.

== Names and Locations ==
On 20 December 2007, the company changed its name from Shenzhen Changhong Hardware Manufacture Co., Ltd. to Shenzhen Changhong Mold Technology Co., Ltd. and then on 15 May 2012 to its current name 'Shenzhen Changhong Technology Co., Ltd.' to reflect changes to its business approach.

On 16 December 2005, the company relocated from Jianxin Village, Ailian Village, Longgang Town, Longgang District, Shenzhen to its current address on the Westside of Jinlong Avenue in Pingshan New District.

== See also ==
- Injection Moulding
