= Shatian station =

Metro station in Shenzhen, Guangdong, China

Shatian 沙田
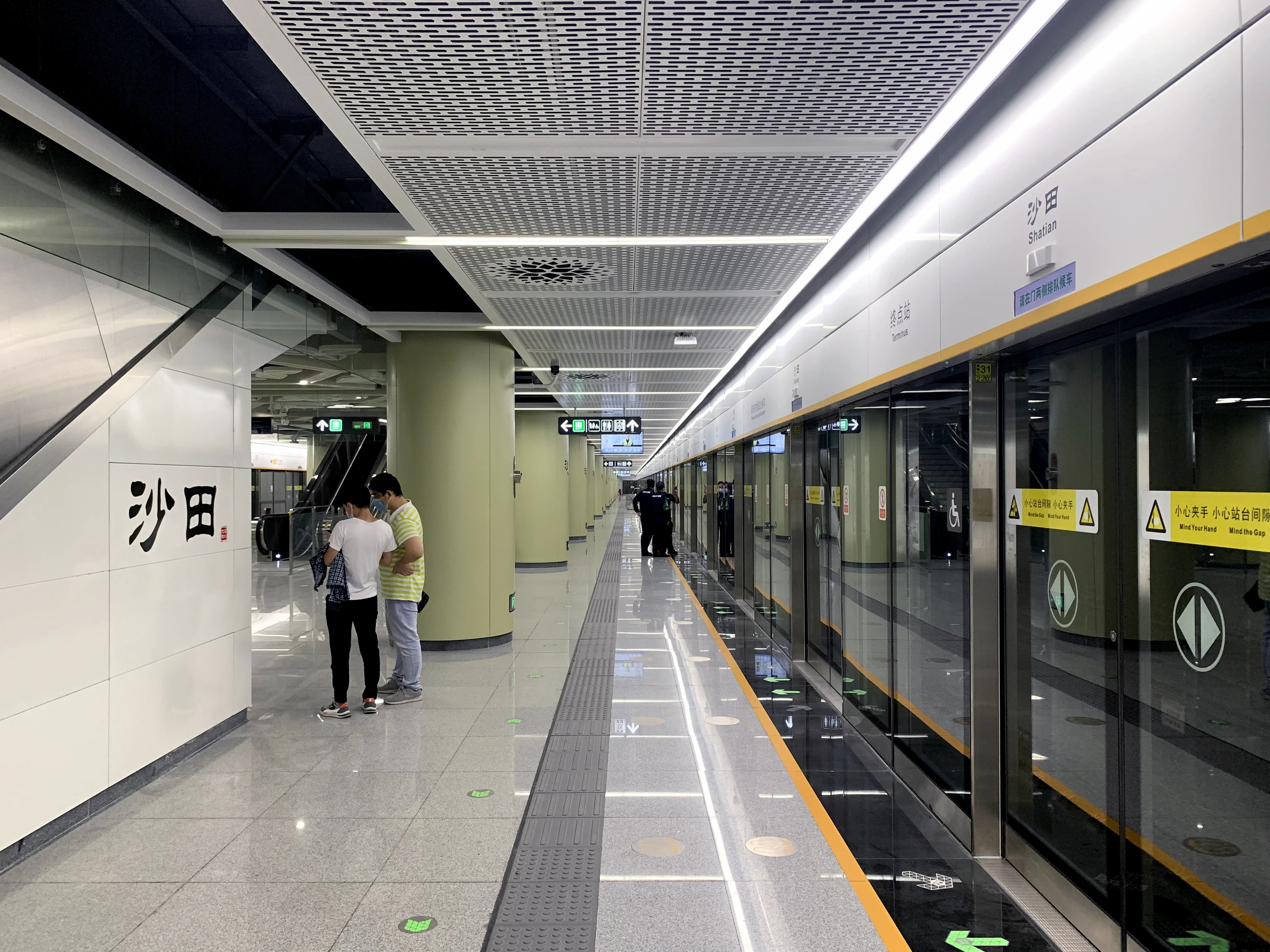
- Platform

General information
- Location: Shenzhen, Guangdong; China
- Coordinates: 22.7587°N 114.3955°E
- Operator: SZMC (Shenzhen Metro Group)
- Line: Line 14
- Platforms: 2 (1 island platform)
- Tracks: 2

Construction
- Structure type: Underground
- Accessible: Yes

History
- Opened: 28 October 2022

Services
| Preceding station | Shenzhen Metro | Following station |
|---|---|---|
| Kengzi towards Gangxia North | Line 14 | Terminus |
Location

Shatian station (Chinese: 沙田站; pinyin: Shātián Zhàn) is a station on Line 14 of Shenzhen Metro in Shenzhen, Guangdong, China, which opened on 28 October 2022. It is located in Pingshan District.

== Station layout ==
| G | - | Exit |
| B1F; Concourse | Lobby | Customer Service, Shops, Vending machines, ATMs |
| B2F; Platforms | Platform | 14 towards Gangxia North (Kengzi) |
| B2F; Platforms | Island platform, doors will open on the left |
| B2F; Platforms | Platform | 14 termination platform |

== Exits ==
| Exit | Destination |
|---|---|
| Exit A | South side of Pingshan Blvd (W), West side of Jinkang Road |
| Exit B | South side of Pingshan Blvd (E), East side of Jinkang Road, Shenzhen No.1 Vocational and Technical School (Pingshan Campus) |
| Exit C | North side of Pingshan Blvd (E), West side of Kengzi Shatian Road, Shatian Community Neighborhood Committee, Shenzhen Pingshan District Shatian Full Time Fire Squadron |
| Exit D | North side of Pingshan Blvd (W) |

== Gallery ==
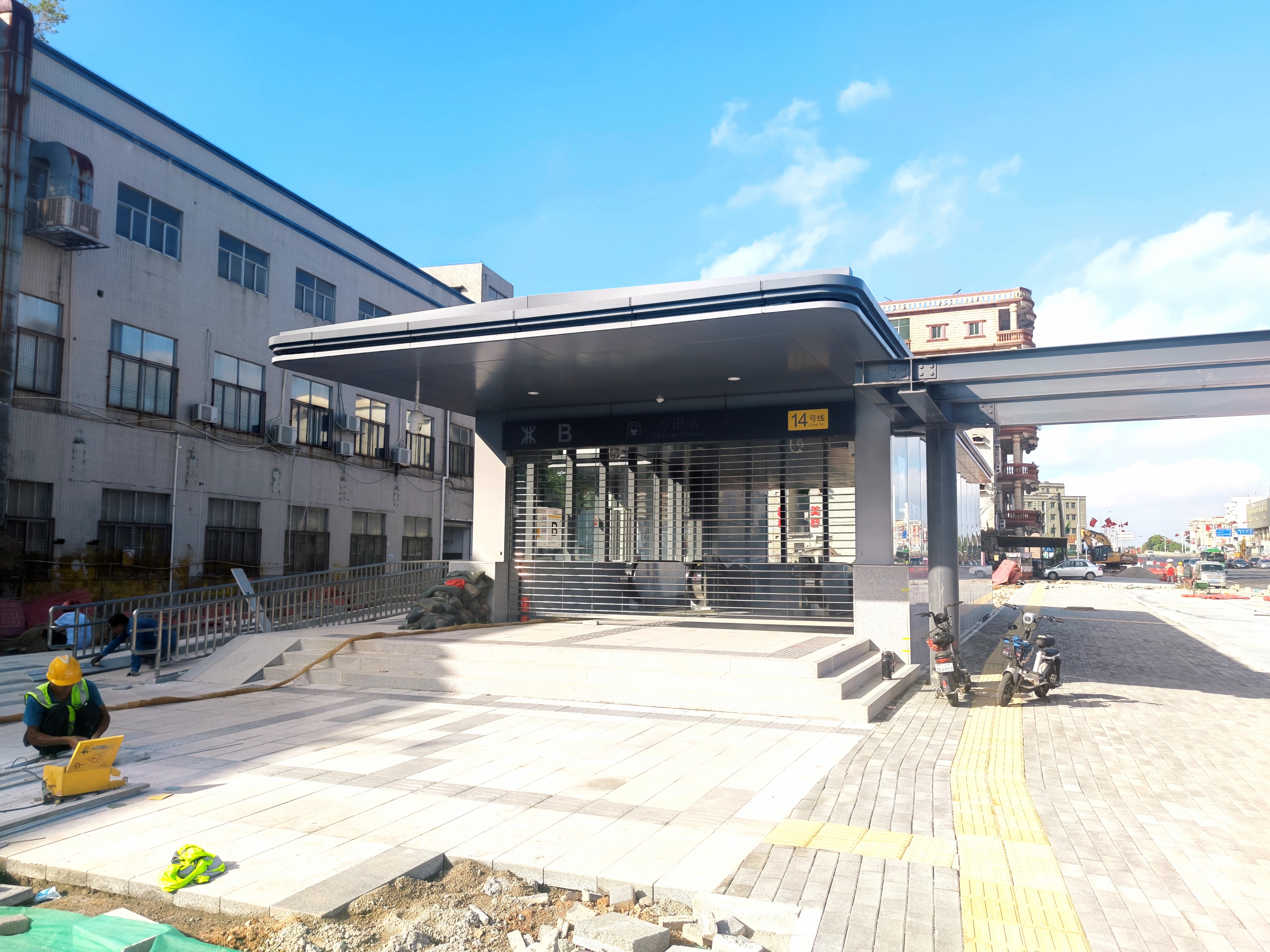
Exit B (Before the station's opening)

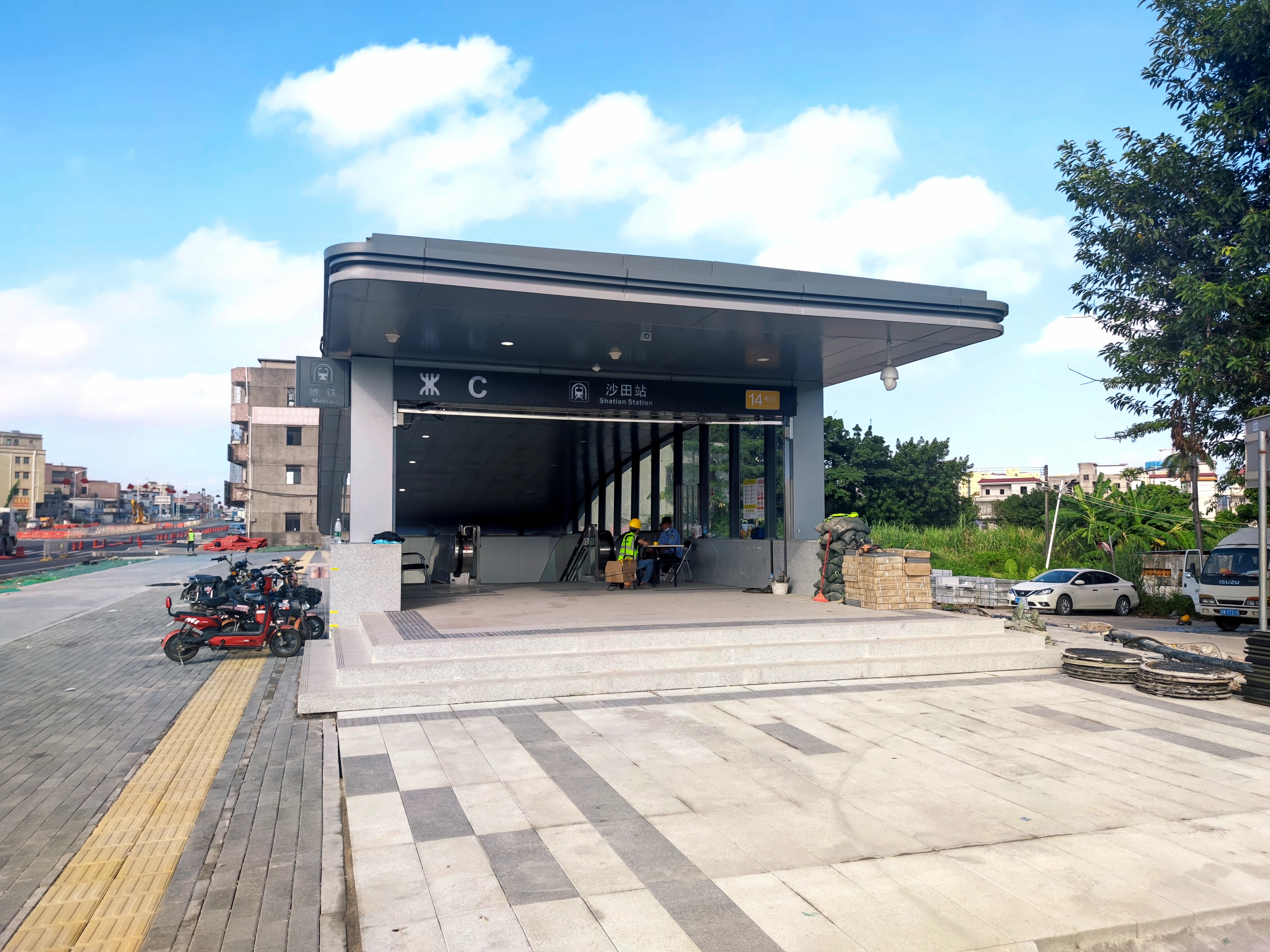
Exit C (Before the station's opening)

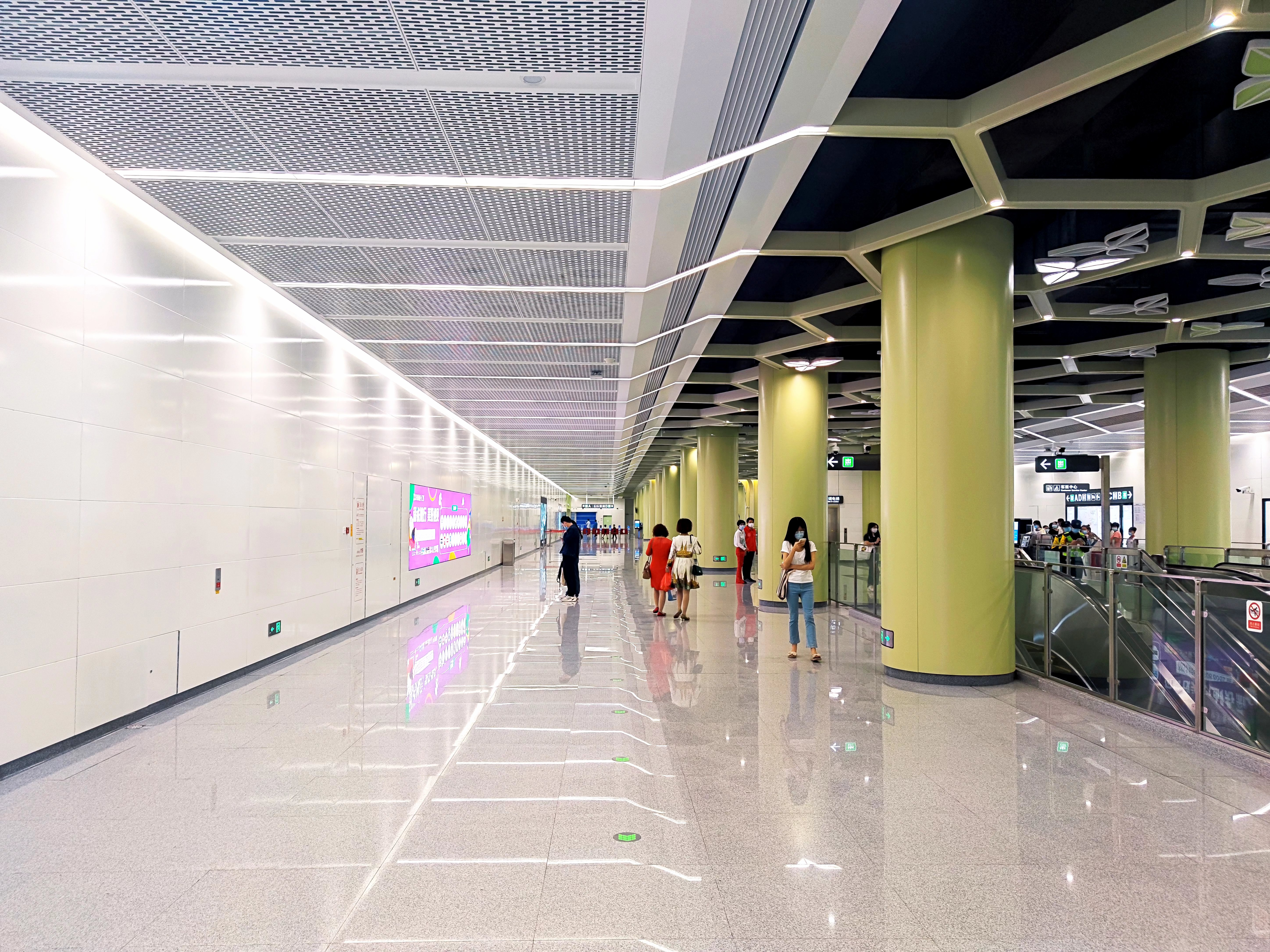
Concourse

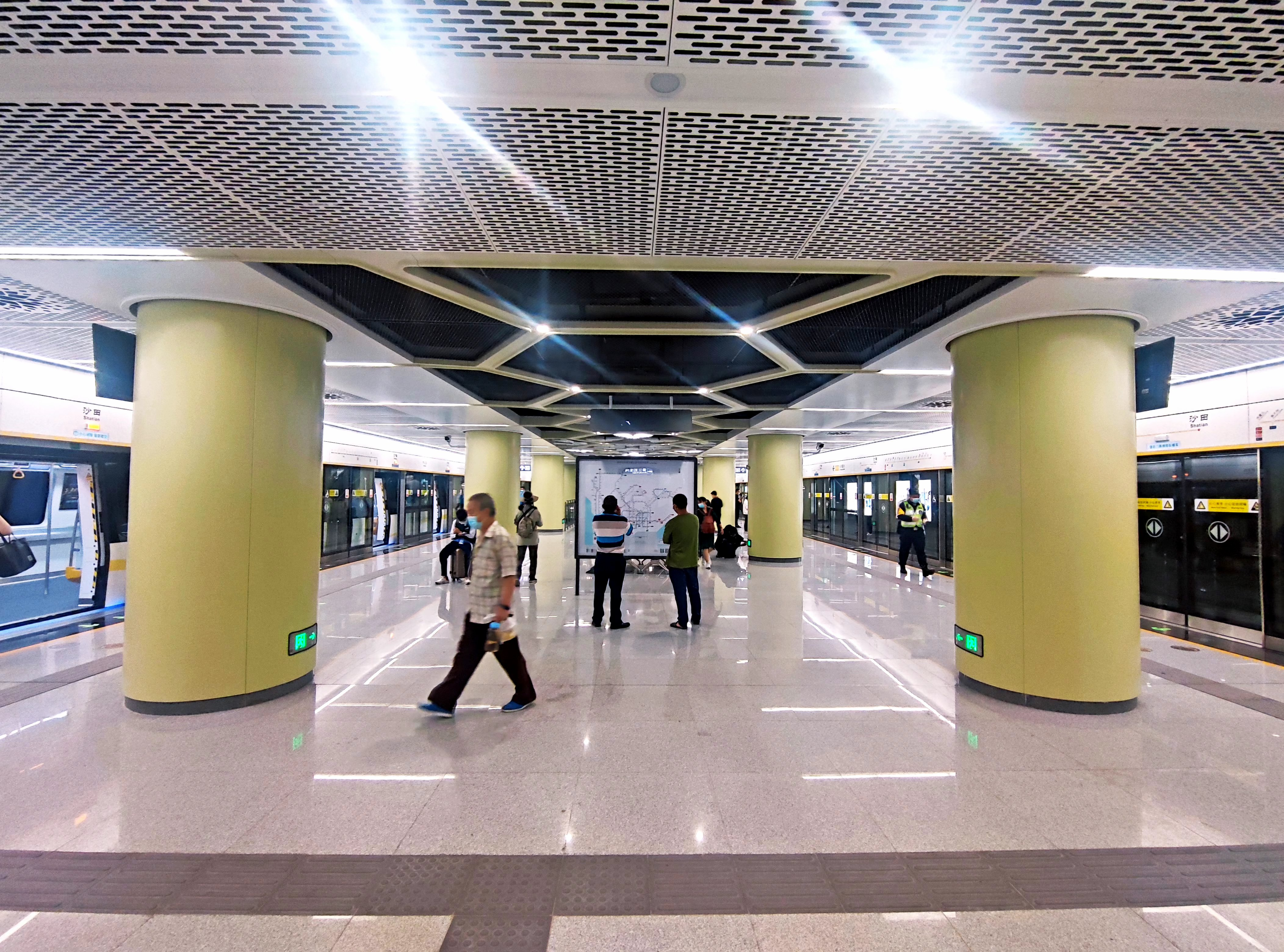
Platform
