= Gangxia North station =

Metro station in Shenzhen, Guangdong, China

Gangxia North 岗厦北
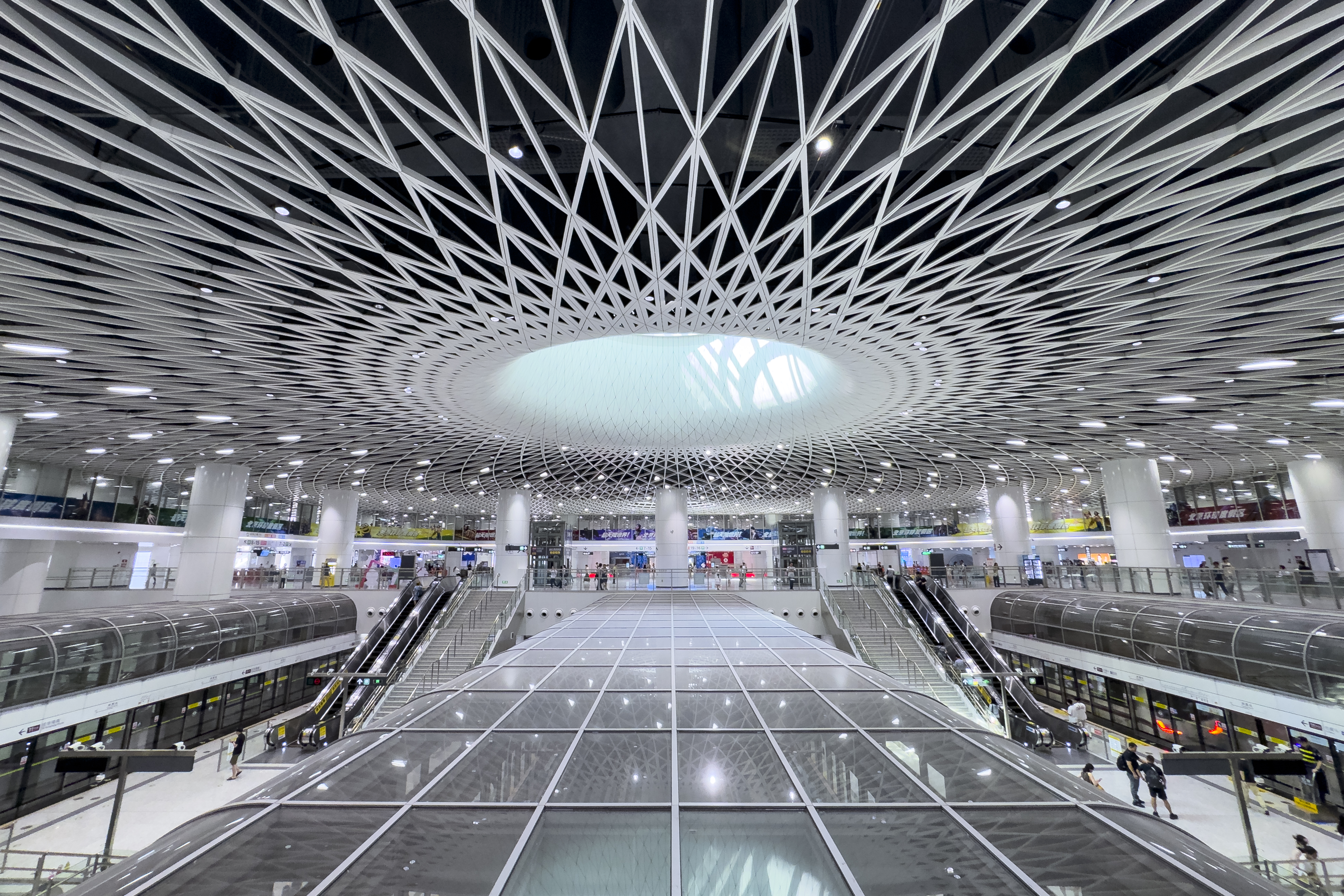
- New atrium including the station icon, 'Shenzhen Eye'

Chinese name
- Traditional Chinese: 崗廈北
- Simplified Chinese: 岗厦北
Transcriptions
Standard Mandarin
- Hanyu Pinyin: Gǎngxià Běi
Yue: Cantonese
- Yale Romanization: Gōnghah Bāk
- Jyutping: Gong1haa6 Bak1

General information
- Location: Futian District, Shenzhen, Guangdong; China
- Coordinates: 22°32′27″N 114°4′8″E
- Operator: SZMC (Shenzhen Metro Group)
- Lines: Line 2; Line 10; Line 11; Line 14
- Platforms: 8 (3 island platforms and 2 side platforms)
- Tracks: 8

Construction
- Structure type: Underground
- Accessible: Yes

History
- Opened: Line 2: 28 June 2011 (15 years ago); Line 10, Line 11 and Line 14: 28 October 2022 (3 years ago)

Services
Preceding station	Shenzhen Metro	Following station
Civic Center towards Chiwan	Line 2	Huaqiang North towards Liantang (Line 8: Xichong)
Lianhuacun towards Shuangyong Street	Line 10	Gangxia towards Futian Checkpoint
Futian towards Bitou	Line 11	Fuxing towards Hongling South
Terminus	Line 14	Huangmugang towards Shatian
Route map
Location

Gangxia North station (simplified Chinese: 岗厦北; traditional Chinese: 崗廈北; pinyin: Gǎngxià Běi; Jyutping: Gong1haa6 Bak1; Cantonese Yale: Gōnghah Bāk) is an interchange station for Line 2, Line 10, Line 11 and Line 14 of the Shenzhen Metro. Line 2 platforms opened on 28 June 2011, Line 10, Line 11 and Line 14 platforms opened on 28 October 2022. Measuring 220,000 meters squared, it is 1.6 times as large as the nearby intermodal Futian station. It is the second four-line interchange station in the Shenzhen Metro after Chegongmiao station.

== Architecture ==
Gangxia North Station was designed in collaboration between the French architecture and engineering firm AREP Architecture and maarc studio. With an area of approximately 220,000 square metres, it is one of the largest underground transport hubs in China. The architectural concept centres on a large central atrium, known as the “Eye of Shenzhen,” conceived to introduce natural daylight deep into the underground concourse. Large circular roof openings and glazed surfaces reduce the perception of enclosure and mitigate the typical subterranean character of metro infrastructure.

== Line 14 concourse ==
Designed by Jiang & Associates Creative Design and China Railway Design Corporation, with Mr Frank Jiang being the Chief Designer, Line 14 concourse incorporates the "Shenzhen Eye" centre ceiling piece, which is a glass sky window to allow sunlight into the station, to try to eliminate the oppressive and dull feeling of underground space. The ceiling also uses the mathematical principle of Fermat's spiral. The huge columns acts as the main element of space for the large atrium. Louvered grilles regulates the day and night light, and alleviates the temperature pressure. The concourse was designed using parametric software.

== Station layout ==
G	-	Exit
B1F; Concourse	Lobby	Customer Service, Shops, Vending machines, ATMs
B2F; Platforms		2 towards Chiwan (Civic Center)
B2F; Platforms	Island platform, doors will open on the left
B2F; Platforms		8 towards Xichong (Huaqiang North)
B2F; Platforms		11 towards Bitou (Futian)
B2F; Platforms	Island platform, doors of will open on the left for 11 and right for 14
B2F; Platforms		14 termination platform
B2F; Platforms		14 towards Shatian (Huangmugang)
B2F; Platforms	Island platform, doors will open on the right for 14 and left for 11
B2F; Platforms		11 towards Hongling South (Fuxing)
B3F; Platforms	Side platform, doors will open on the right
B3F; Platforms		10 towards Futian Checkpoint (Gangxia)
B3F; Platforms		10 towards Shuangyong Street (Lianhuacun)
B3F; Platforms	Side platform, doors will open on the right

=== Entrances/exits ===
The station has 20 points of entry/exit, where 18 exits include elevators. When only Line 2 was in operation, only Exit 17 and 18 (then known as Exits A and B) were used. In the initial opening of the station expansion on 28 October 2022, the station opened Exits 1–7, 12, 18 and 19. Exits 13–16 opened on 20 March 2024, and Exits 8–11 opened on 28 June 2024.

Exit number	Gallery	Destination
1L		Shenzhen Central Garden, Tianjian Century Garden, Yasongju, Shenzhen Contemporary Art And Urban Planning
2L		Shennan Boulevard, China Phoenix Television Building, Shenzhen Customs General Customs Building
3L		Shennan Boulevard, China Mobile Shenzhen Branch
4L		Bonjour Center
5L		Bonjour Center, Shennan Boulevard
6L		Shennan Boulevard, Zhuoyue Center, Wentianxiang Primary School
7L		Xinghe Century Building, Zhuoyue Center, Jindi Center, Bank of China Building, Zhongzhou building, Bonjour Center, Culin Residence, Wentianxiang Primary School
8L		Wentianxiang Primary School, Shennan Boulevard
9L		Bonjour Center, Shennan Boulevard
10L		Gangxia Estate, Shennan Boulevard
11L		Gangxia Estate, Shennan Boulevard
12L		Hilton Hotel, Greater China International Trading Center, Fuhua New Village, Shenda New Village, Futian Middle School, Shenzhen International Culture Building, Gangxia Estate, Jialin Haoting, Caitian Mingyuan, Wenwei Building
13L		Greater China International Trading Center, Gangxia Estate, Shenzhen University New Estate
14L		Greater China International Trading Center, Gangxia Estate, Shenzhen University New Estate
15L		North side of Shennan Boulevard, International Innovation Center, Shenzhen First Vocational and Technical School, Futian District Administrative Service Hall, The First Vocational Technical School of Shenzhen
16L		North side of Shennan Boulevard, International Innovation Center, Shenzhen First Vocational and Technical School, Futian District Administrative Service Hall, The First Vocational Technical School of Shenzhen
17L		Shennan Boulevard, Huanggang Road
18L		North side of Shennan Boulevard, Caitian Road, Hongjia Hotel, CGN Building, Pingan International Hotel, Huarun Wanjia, Phoenix Mansion, Princeton Kindergarten
19L		Fujian Building, Tianmian New Village, Tianmian City Building, Green Oasis School, Fuli Garden, The First Vocational Technical School of Shenzhen (Futian Campus), Caidecheng, Fujing Building, International Talent Building, Futian Science and Technology Plaza, Caixia Pavilion, Zhenye Garden, Fulian Garden, Changfu Garden, Princeton Kindergarten
Note: Tactile Paving | Elevator Access

== Accident ==
On 7 July 2018, during the construction of the Line 10 part of the station, four electric cables were broken, leading to a massive power cut at the nearby buildings. The broken cables were repaired seven days later.

== Gallery ==
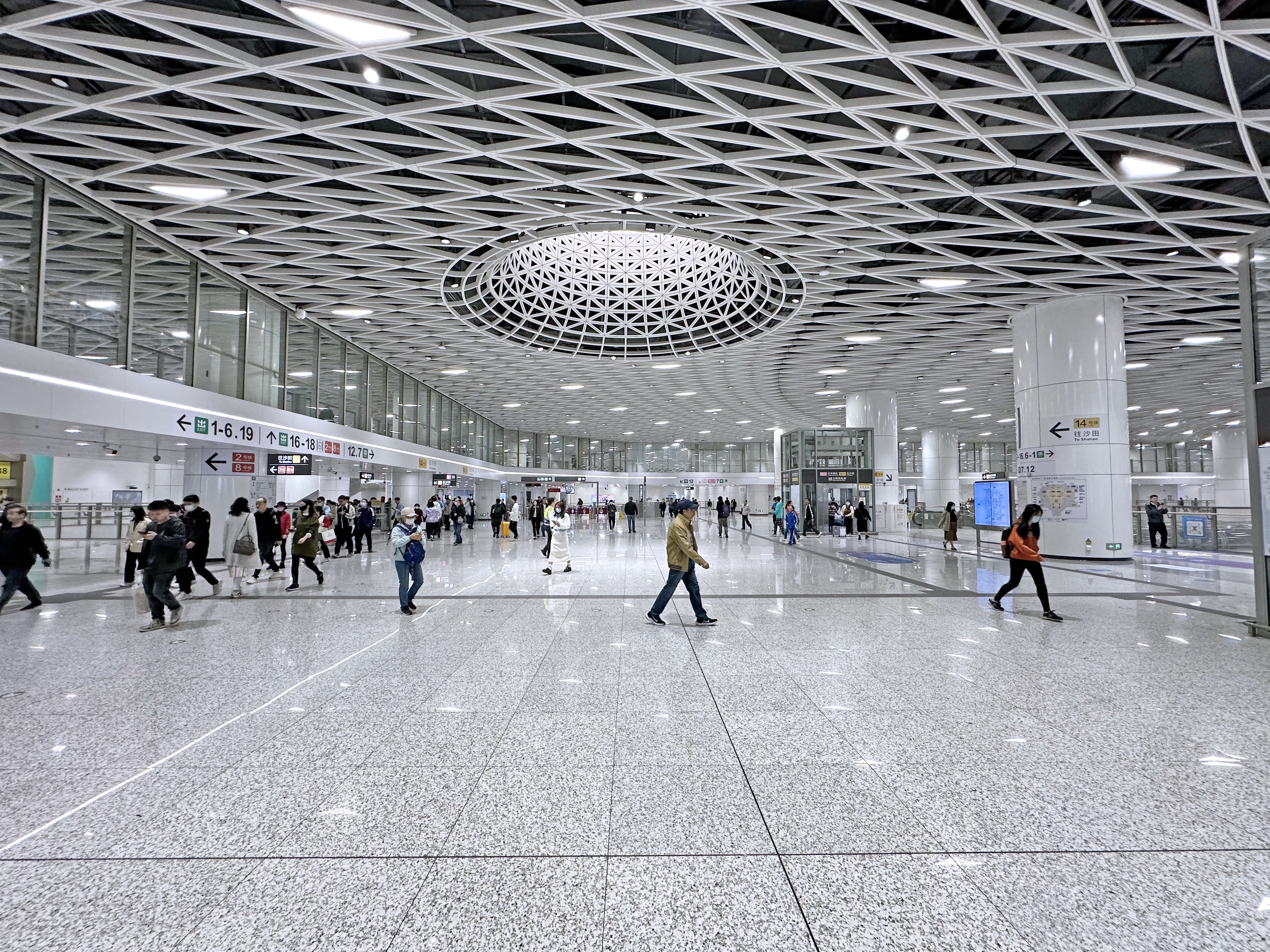
Concourse

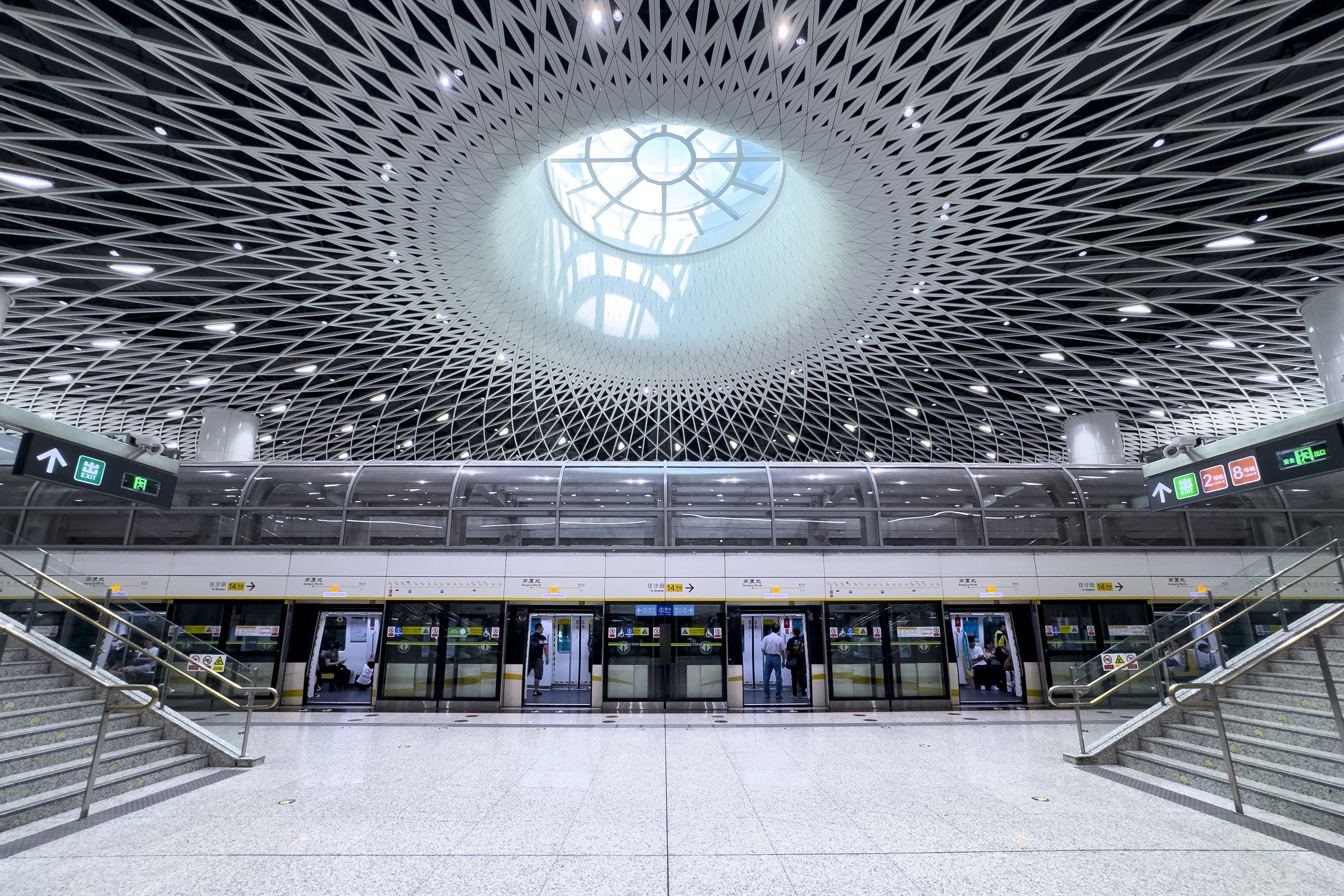
Platform

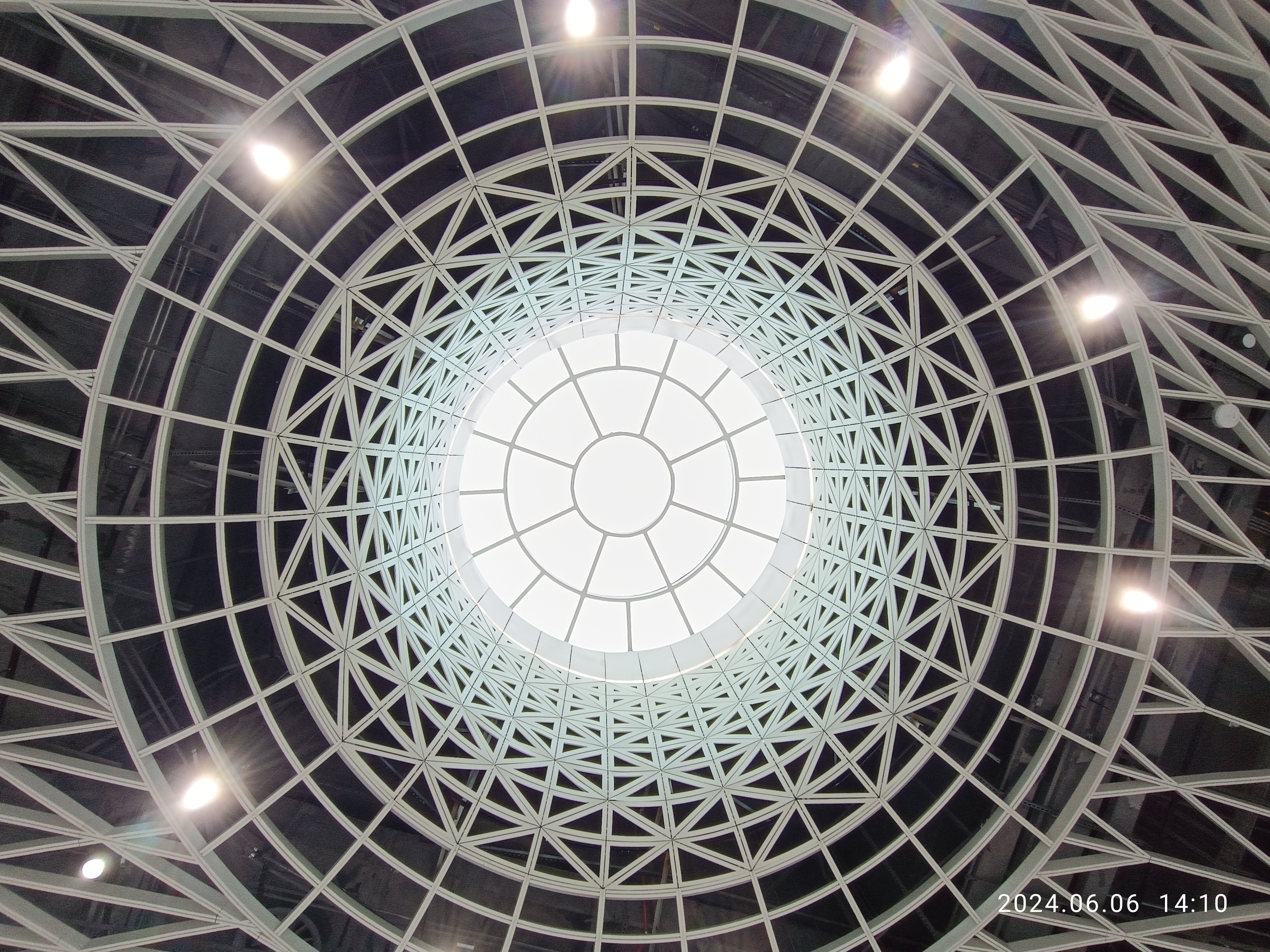
Ceiling window, known as the "Shenzhen eye", allowing daylight to pass into the station.

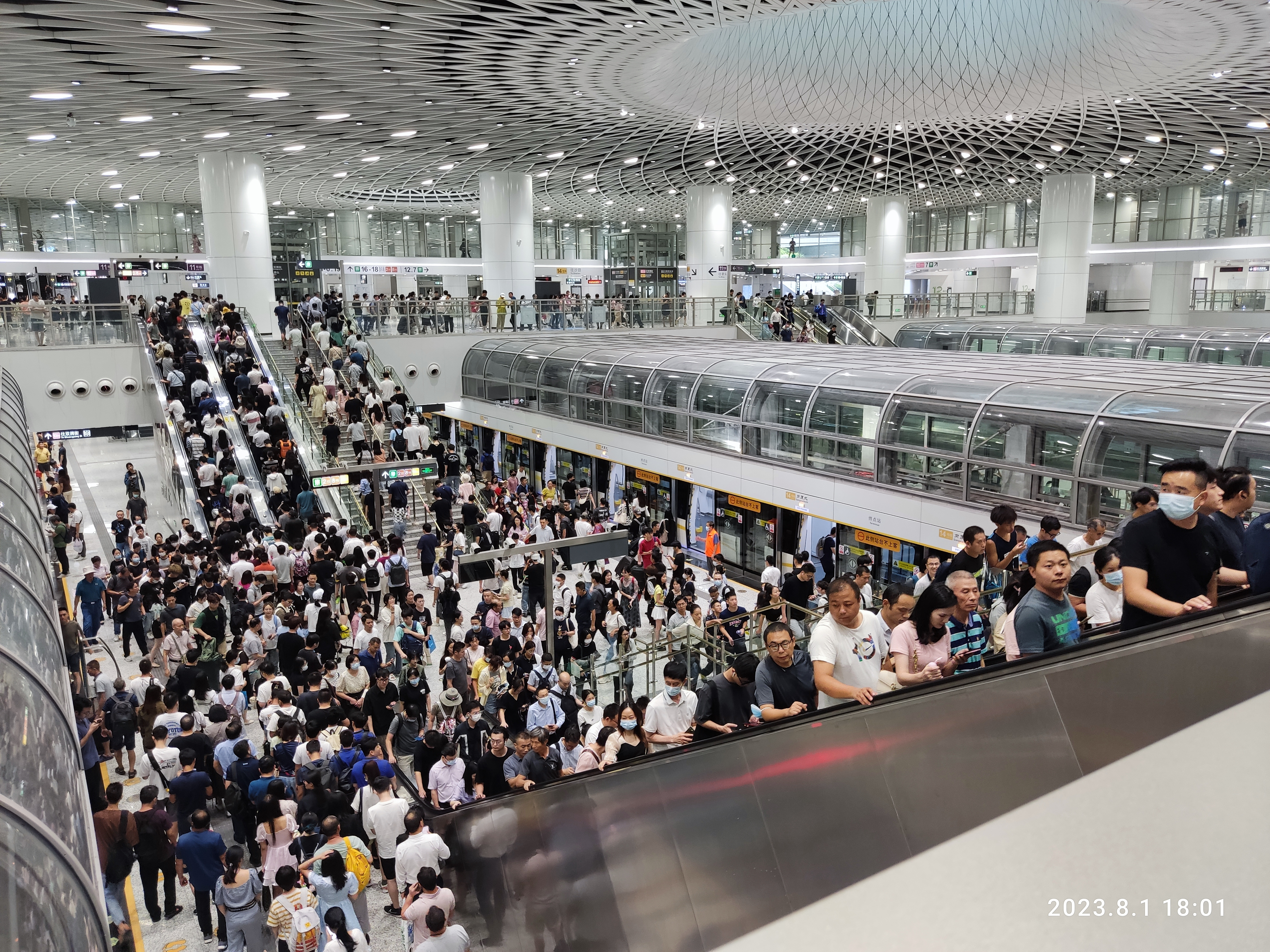
Peak hour

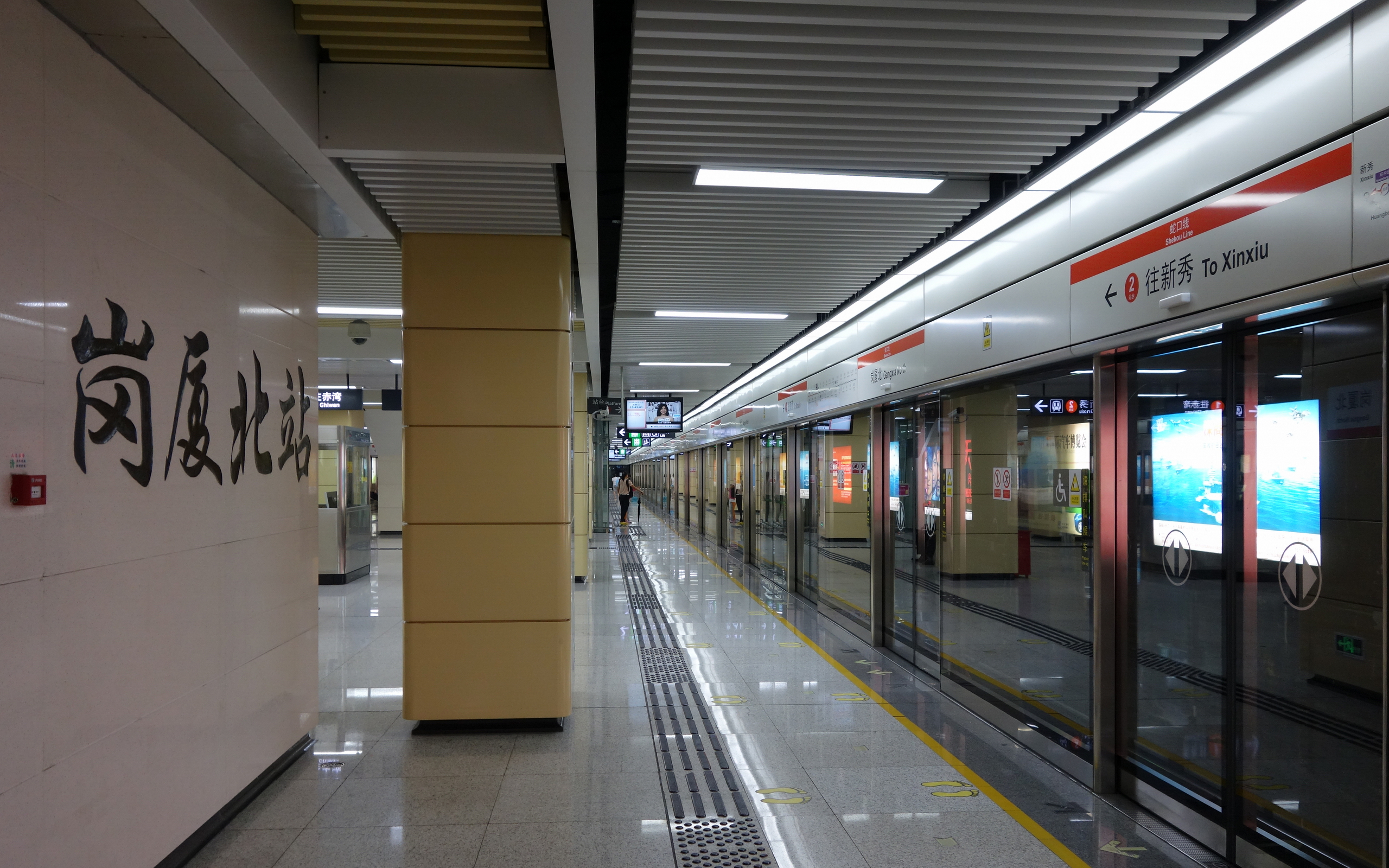
Line 2 platform

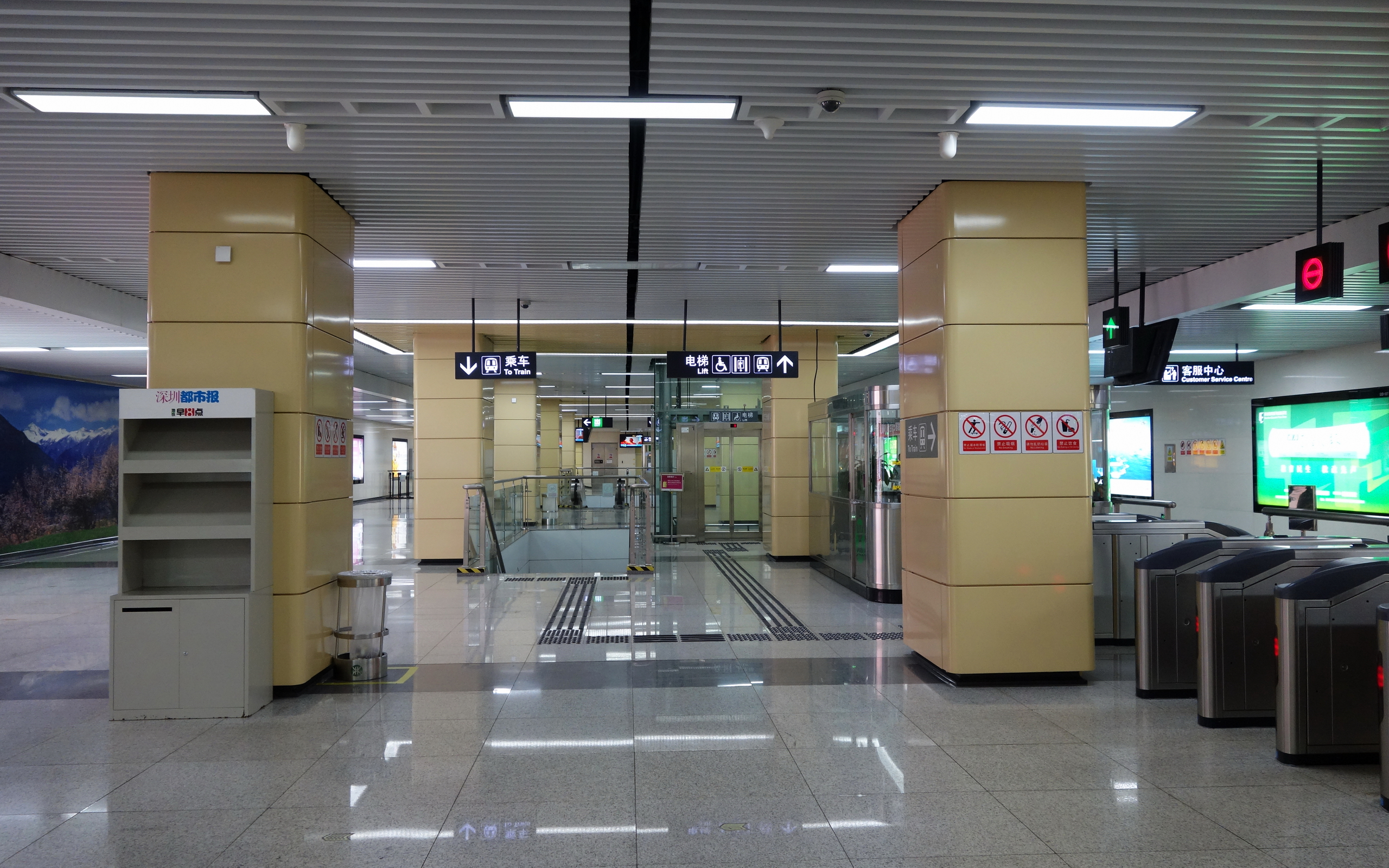
Line 2 concourse

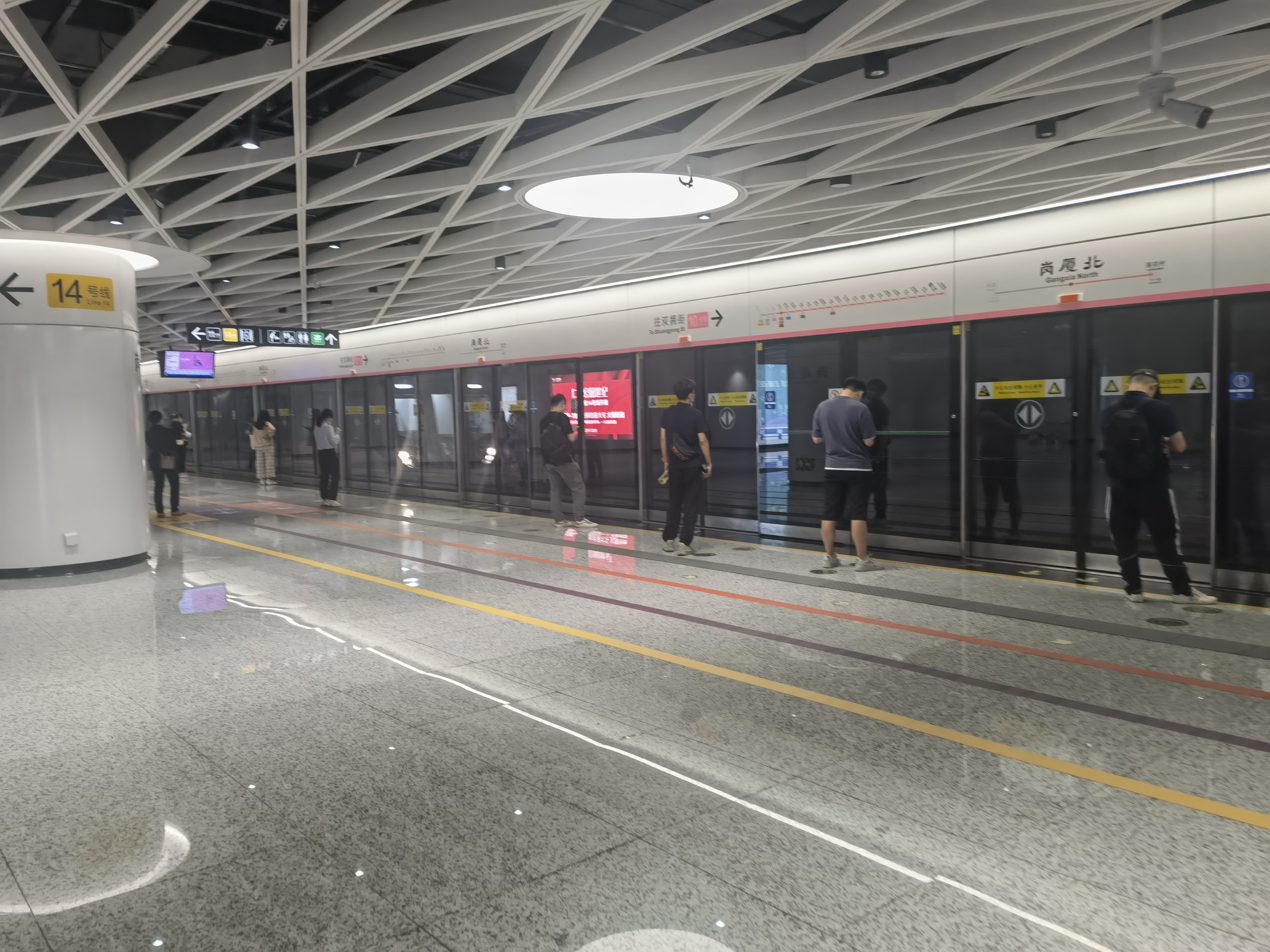
Line 10 northbound platform, towards Shuangyong Street

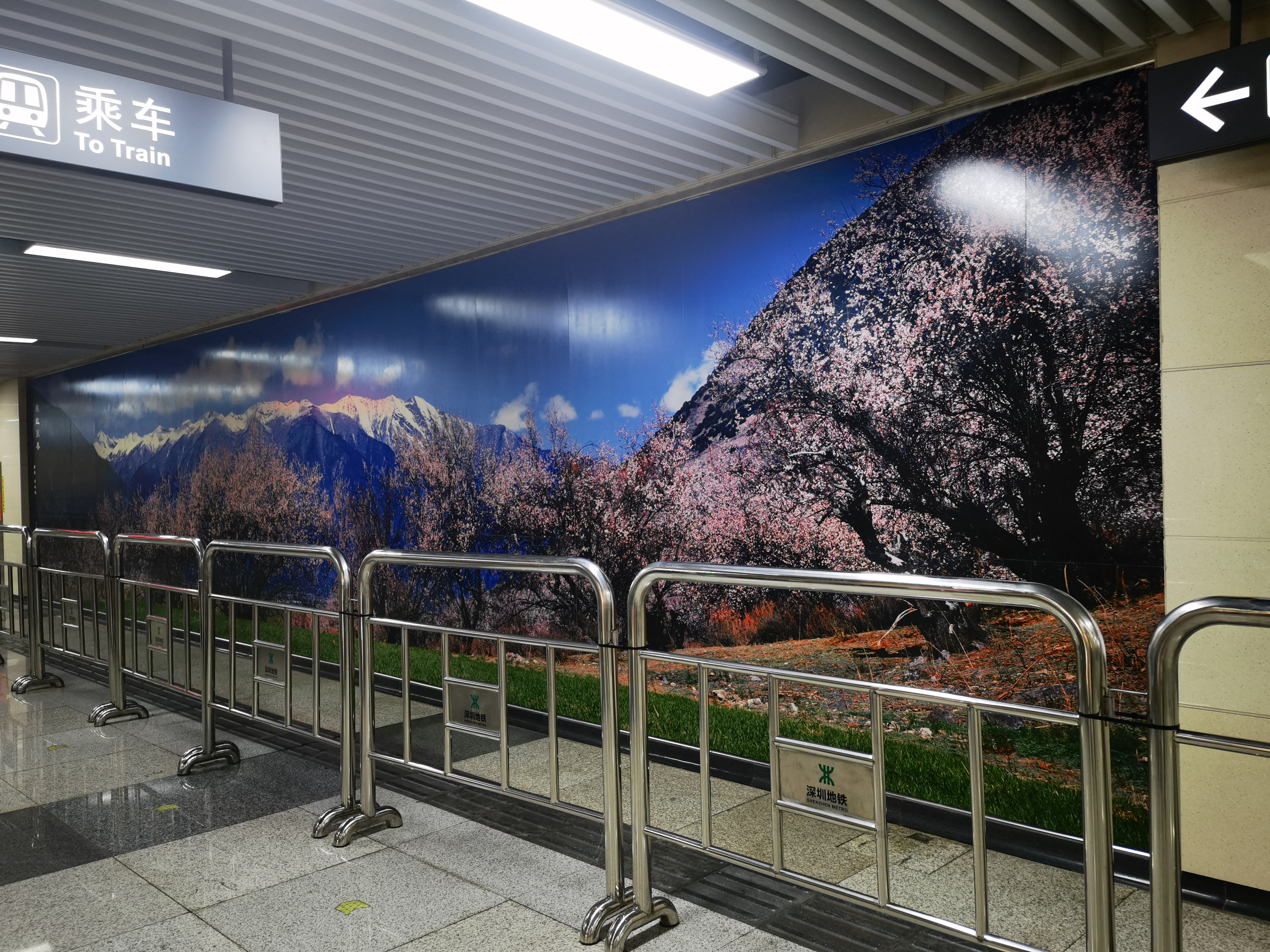
Line 2 concourse art wall

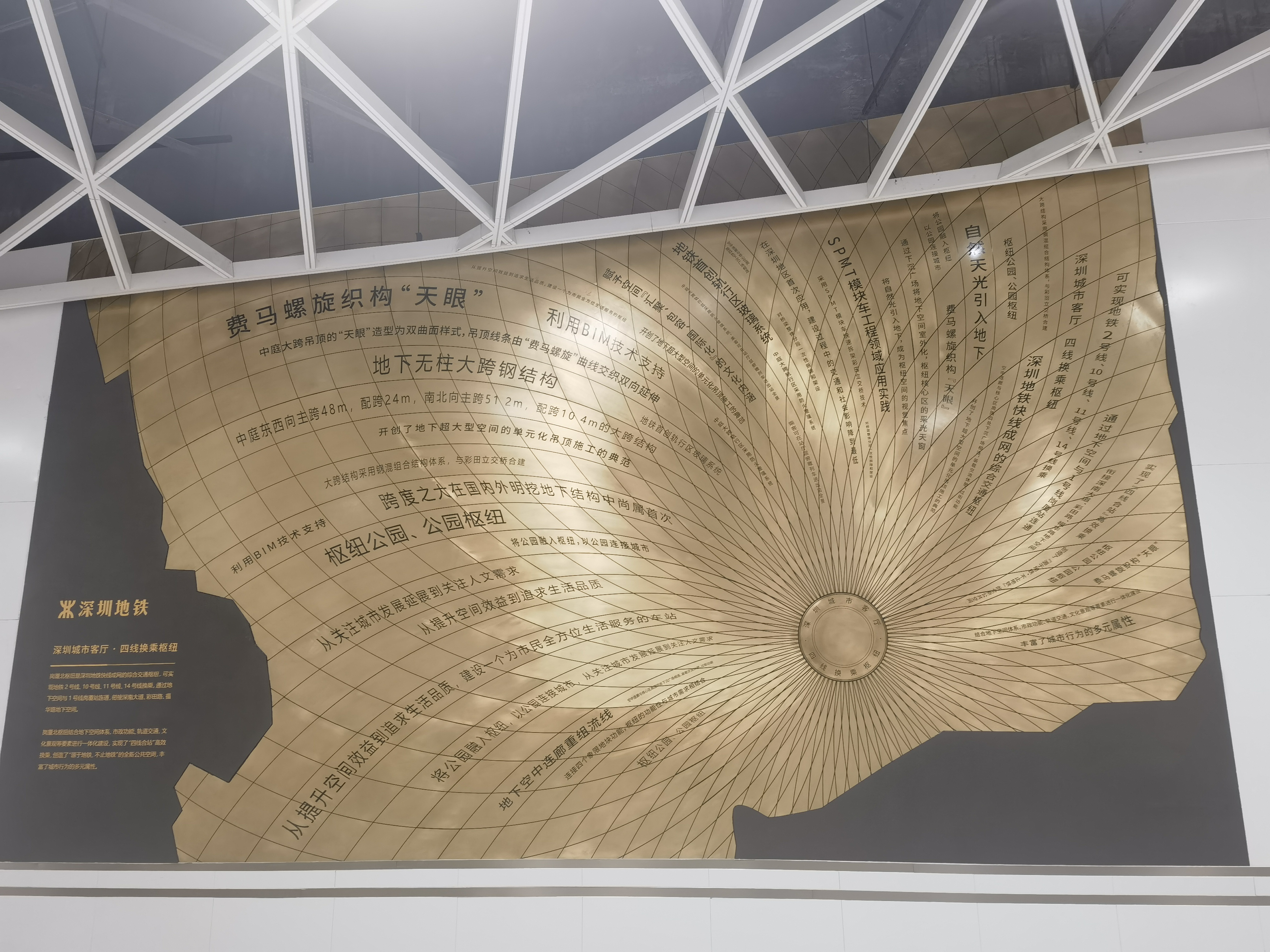
Lines 10, 11 and 14 concourse art wall

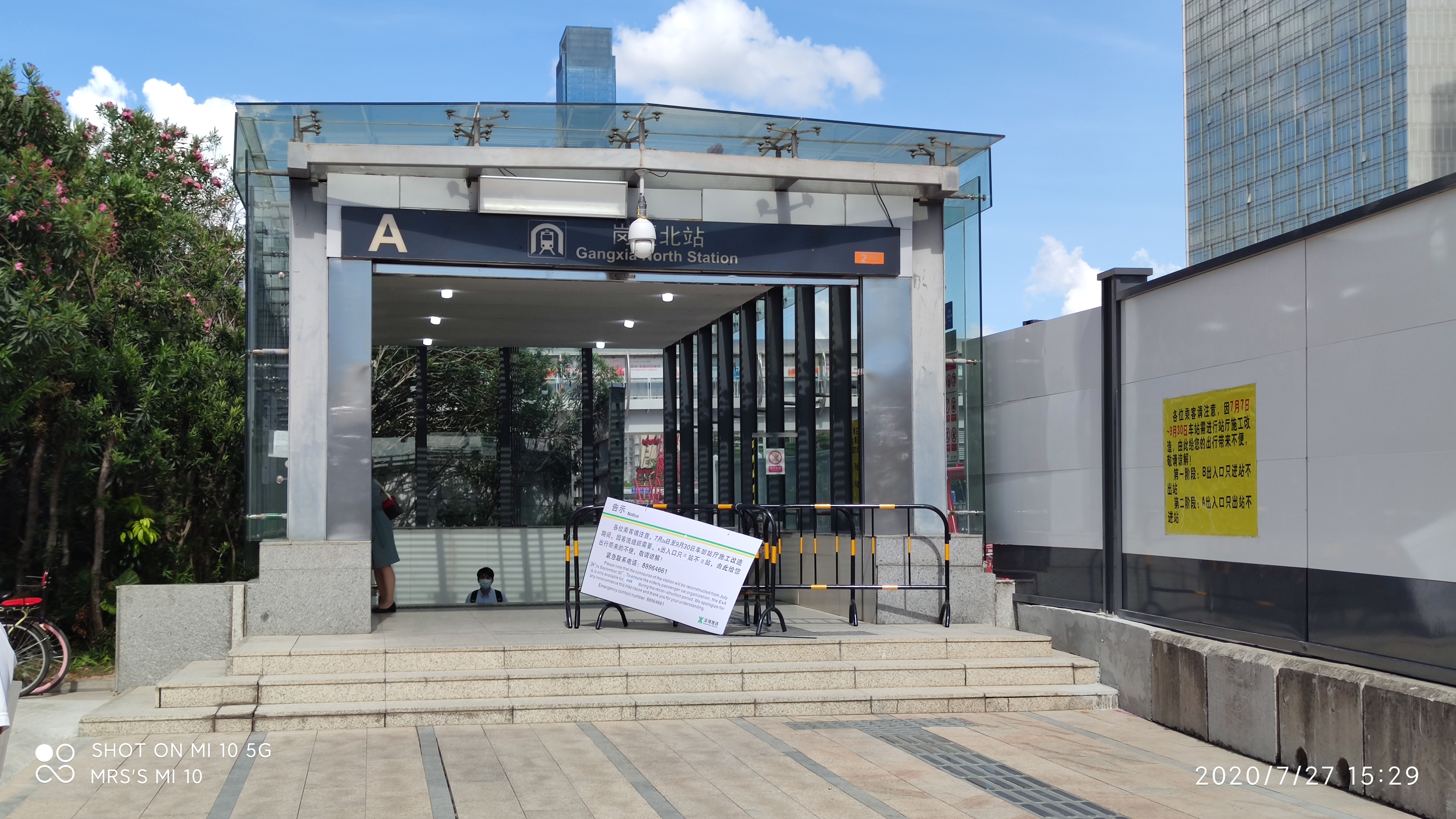
Former Exit A (now Exit 18)

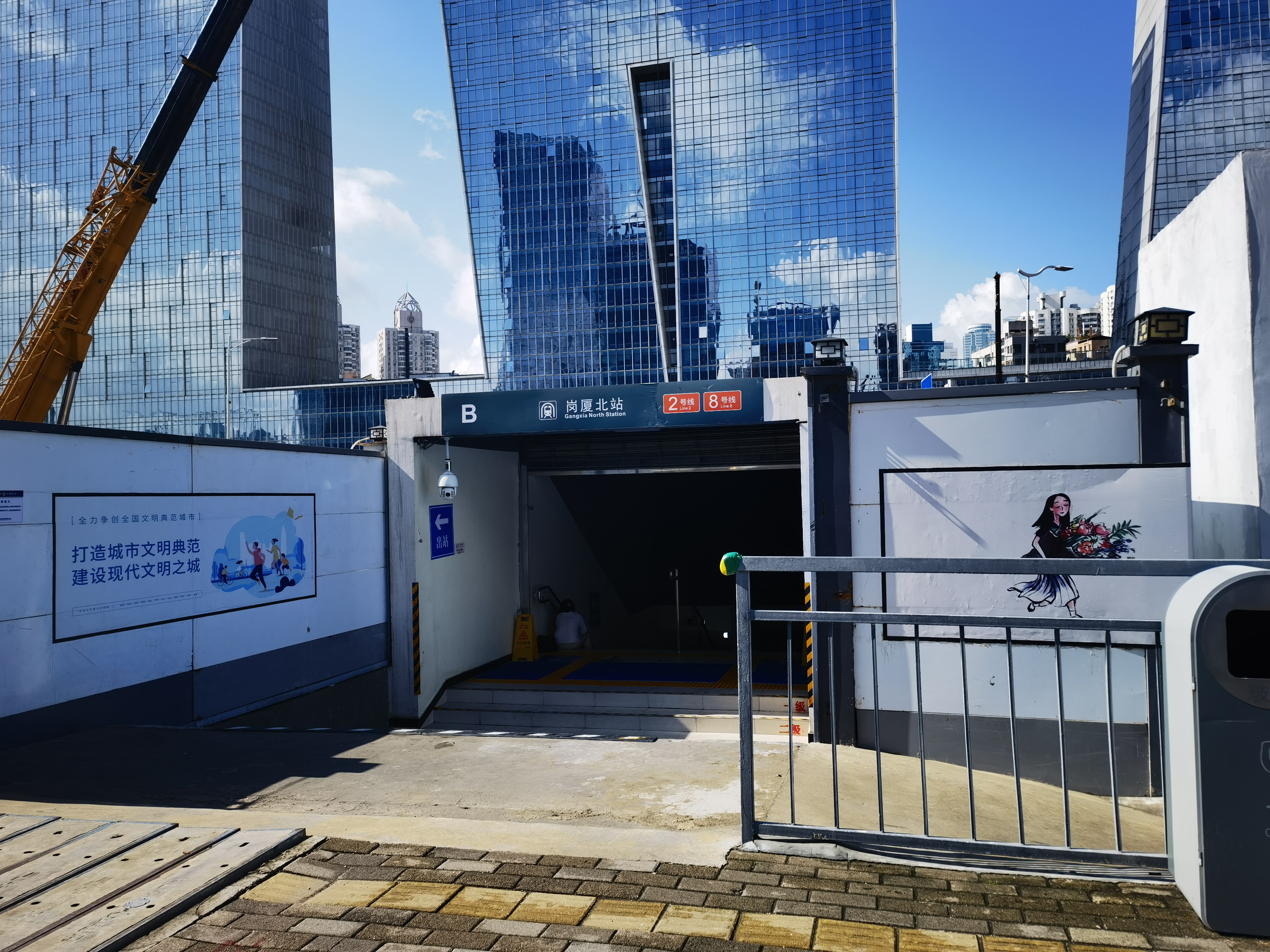
Temporary Exit B during station expansion
