= Pingshan, Shenzhen =

Coordinates: 22°41′16″N 114°20′53″E

Pingshan 坪山区
- District
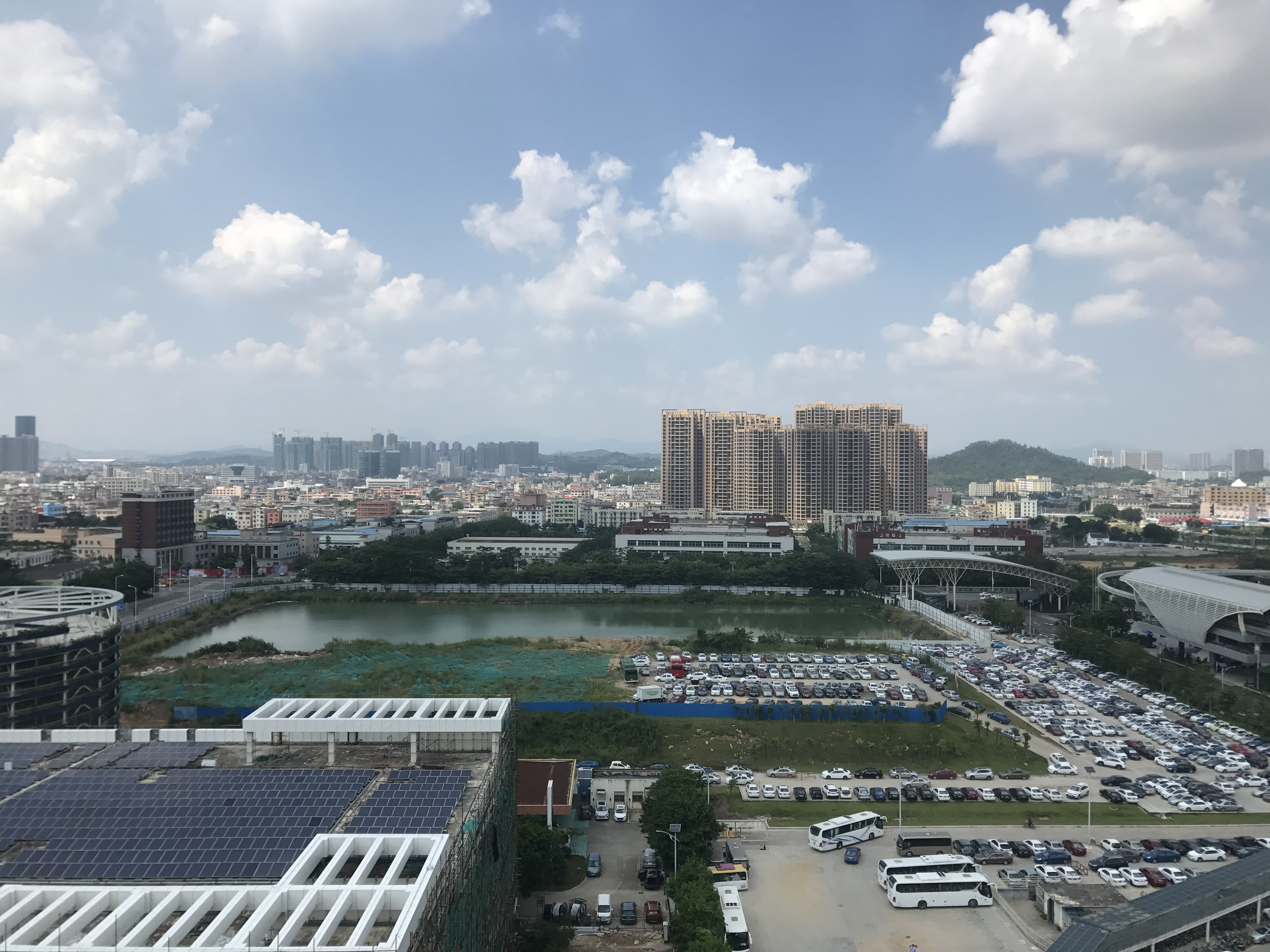

- Pingshan (highlighted in pink) in Shenzhen
- Country: People's Republic of China
- Province: Guangdong
- Sub-provincial city: Shenzhen

Area
  - Total: 168 km^{2} (65 sq mi)

Population (2020)
  - Total: 551,333
  - Density: 3,280/km^{2} (8,500/sq mi)
- Time zone: UTC+8 (China Standard)
- Postal code: 518118
- Website: www.psxq.gov.cn

Pingshan, Shenzhen
- Simplified Chinese: 坪山区
- Traditional Chinese: 坪山區
- Guangdong Romanization: ping4 san1 kêu1
- Hanyu Pinyin: Píngshān Qū
Transcriptions
Standard Mandarin
- Hanyu Pinyin: Píngshān Qū
Yue: Cantonese
- Yale Romanization: Pìhngsāan Kēui
- Jyutping: ping4 saan1 keoi1
- Canton Romanization: ping4 san1 kêu1

Alternative Chinese name
- Chinese: 坪山
- Guangdong Romanization: ping4 san1
- Hanyu Pinyin: Píngshān
Transcriptions
Standard Mandarin
- Hanyu Pinyin: Píngshān
Yue: Cantonese
- Yale Romanization: Pìhngsāan
- Jyutping: ping4 saan1
- Canton Romanization: ping4 san1

Pingshan District is a district of Shenzhen, Guangdong.

== History ==
Pingshan was established as a New District on June 30, 2009, by the Shenzhen municipal government. This new district superseded the old plan which was initiated back in 1994 and began construction in 1997. It was still part of Longgang District in administrative management. On October 11, 2016, Pingshan was officially separated from Longgang to become a district itself.

Located southwest of the Huanping community in Pingshan New District, the Dawan Ancestral Residence is one of the biggest Hakka buildings in China. It was built by the Zeng family in 1791 during the reign of the Qianlong Emperor in the Qing dynasty.

In Summer 2018, The Pingshan District made international news after a group of workers from The Jasic manufacturing plant went on strike and demonstrated along with student activists from the Jasic Solidarity Support Group. The event is referred to as The Jasic Incident.

== Economy ==
The car manufacturer BYD has its headquarters on BYD Road (比亚迪路; Bǐyàdí Lù; bei2 aa3 dik6 lou6), Pingshan New District., as does the plastic injection mold-maker Shenzhen Changhong Technology Co., Ltd., and technology company Jasic Technology Company Ltd.

== Subdistricts ==
Name	Chinese (S)	Hanyu Pinyin	Canton Romanization	Population (2010)	Area (km^{2})
Pingshan Subdistrict	坪山街道	Píngshān Jiēdào	ping4 san1 gai1 dou6	205,999	11.78
Biling Subdistrict	碧岭街道	Bìlǐng Jiēdào	big1 ling5 gai1 dou6	205,999	25.35
Maluan Subdistrict	马峦街道	Mǎluán Jiēdào	ma5 lün4 gai1 dou6	205,999	43.86
Kengzi Subdistrict	坑梓街道	Kēngzǐ Jiēdào	hang1 ji2 gai1 dou6	94,801	24.07
Shijing Subdistrict	石井街道	Shíjǐng Jiēdào	ség6 zéng2 gai1 dou6	94,801	36.52
Longtian Subdistrict	龙田街道	Lóngtián Jiēdào	lung4 tin4 gai1 dou6	94,801	26.14

== Geography ==
The new district covers an area of 168 square kilometres (1.81×10^{9} sq ft). Pingshan New District is situated in the north-eastern part of Shenzhen city. It is next to Huizhou City in the east.

== Education ==
Shenzhen Technology University is in the district.

Schools operated by the Shenzhen municipal government

- Shenzhen Senior High School East Campus (东校区)

== See also ==
- Guangdong
- Guangming New Area
- Longgang District
