= Baolong =

Baolong may refer to:

- Guangzhou Baolong Motors, defunct Chinese car maker
- Powerlong or Baolong, Chinese real estate company
- Baolong station, a train station of Shenzhen Metro
- Xia Baolong (born 1952), Chinese politician
