= Polarsun Automobile =

Chinese automobile manufacturer

Polarsun Automobile Company
- Native name: 中顺汽车有限公司
- Industry: Automotive
- Founded: 2003; 23 years ago
- Defunct: 2013 (Production closed); 2018 (Stock transfer to WM Motors)
- Successor: WM Motors
- Headquarters: Shenyang, China
- Area served: Worldwide

Polarsun Automobile (Chinese: 中顺汽车; pinyin: Zhōngshùn Qìchē) was a Chinese automaker headquartered in Shenyang city, Liaoning province.

== History ==
Originally called Songliao Automobile (松辽汽车股份有限公司), the company was reconstructed in 2003 to become Shenyang Zhongshun Automobile (沈阳中顺汽车有限公司), or Polarsun Automobile.

In 2003, Polarsun Automobile established its automobile research and development center in Detroit, Michigan in the United States as its second R&D center in North America, following the first one founded in Los Angeles in 2002.

It was reported that production has ceased in 2013 due to slow sales. As of January 2018, the stocks of Polarsun Automobile was fully transferred and the name of the company has been changed from Polarsun Motor Holdings Ltd (中順汽車控股有限公司) to WM Motors (Weltmeister 威马汽车制造温州有限公司), a Chinese NEV company.

== Products ==
- Polarsun Century, a commercial van based on the fourth generation Toyota HiAce.
- Polarsun MPV-A, a 7 to 9 seater MPV with styling inspired by the Mitsubishi Space Gear with the front fascia inspired by the Nissan Serena.
- Polarsun MPV, a 6-seater compact MPV.
- Polarsun MPV-B, a 5-seater compact MPV with styling inspired by the first generation Mazda Premacy.
- Polarsun MPV-C, a 5-seater mini MPV with styling inspired by the first generation Honda Fit.
- Polarsun SUV, a compact SUV with styling inspired by the first generation Ford Escape. Powered by a 2.3L engine mated to a 5-speed manual gearbox.
- Polarsun Limousine, a stretched mid-size SUV with styling inspired by the second generation Honda CR-V compact crossover.

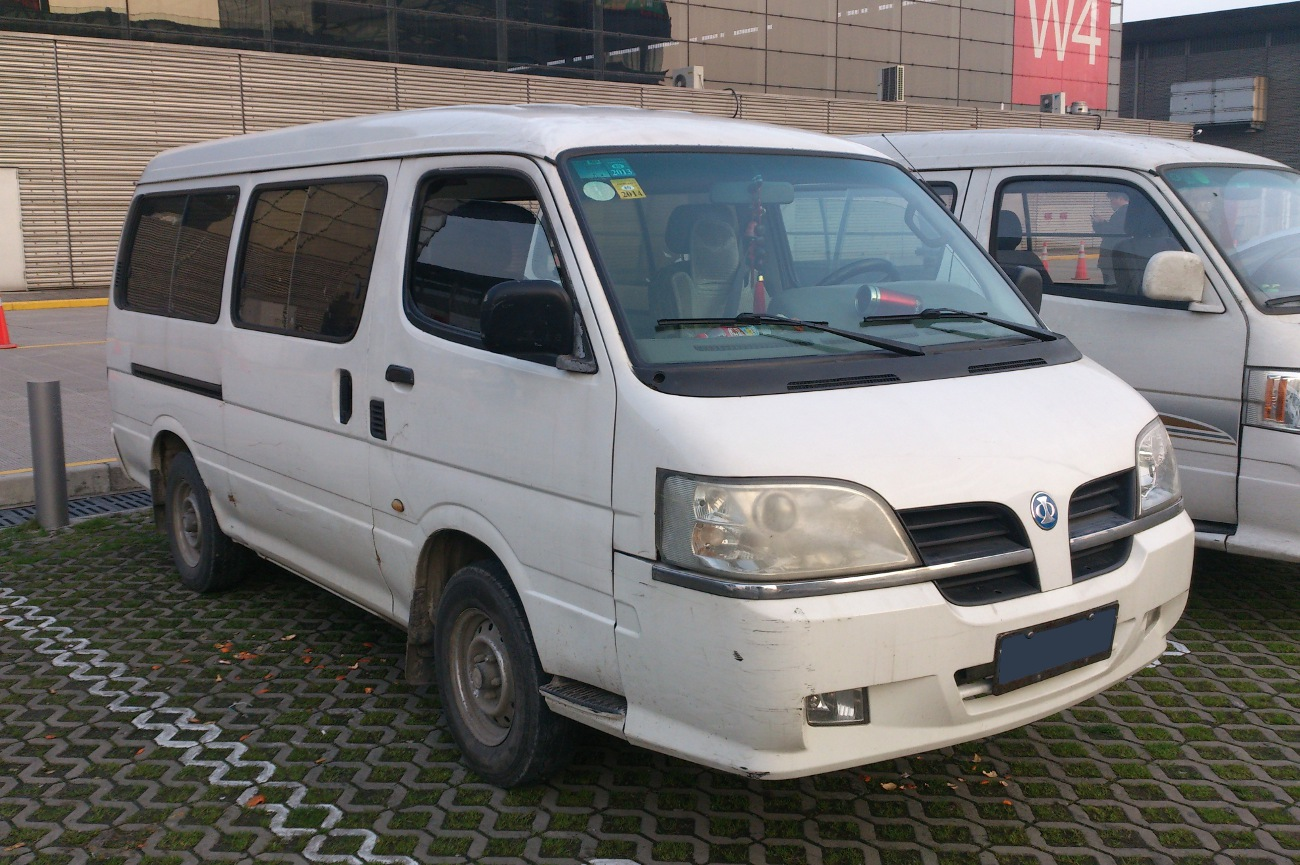
Polarsun Century.
