= Jinlong station =

Jinlong station may refer to the following stations in China:

- Jinlong station (Guangzhou Metro), a station on Line 7 of Guangzhou Metro in Foshan, Guangdong.
- Jinlong station (Shenzhen Metro), a station on Line 14 of Shenzhen Metro in Shenzhen, Guangdong.
