= Midea station =

Guangzhou Metro Line 7 station

Midea 美的
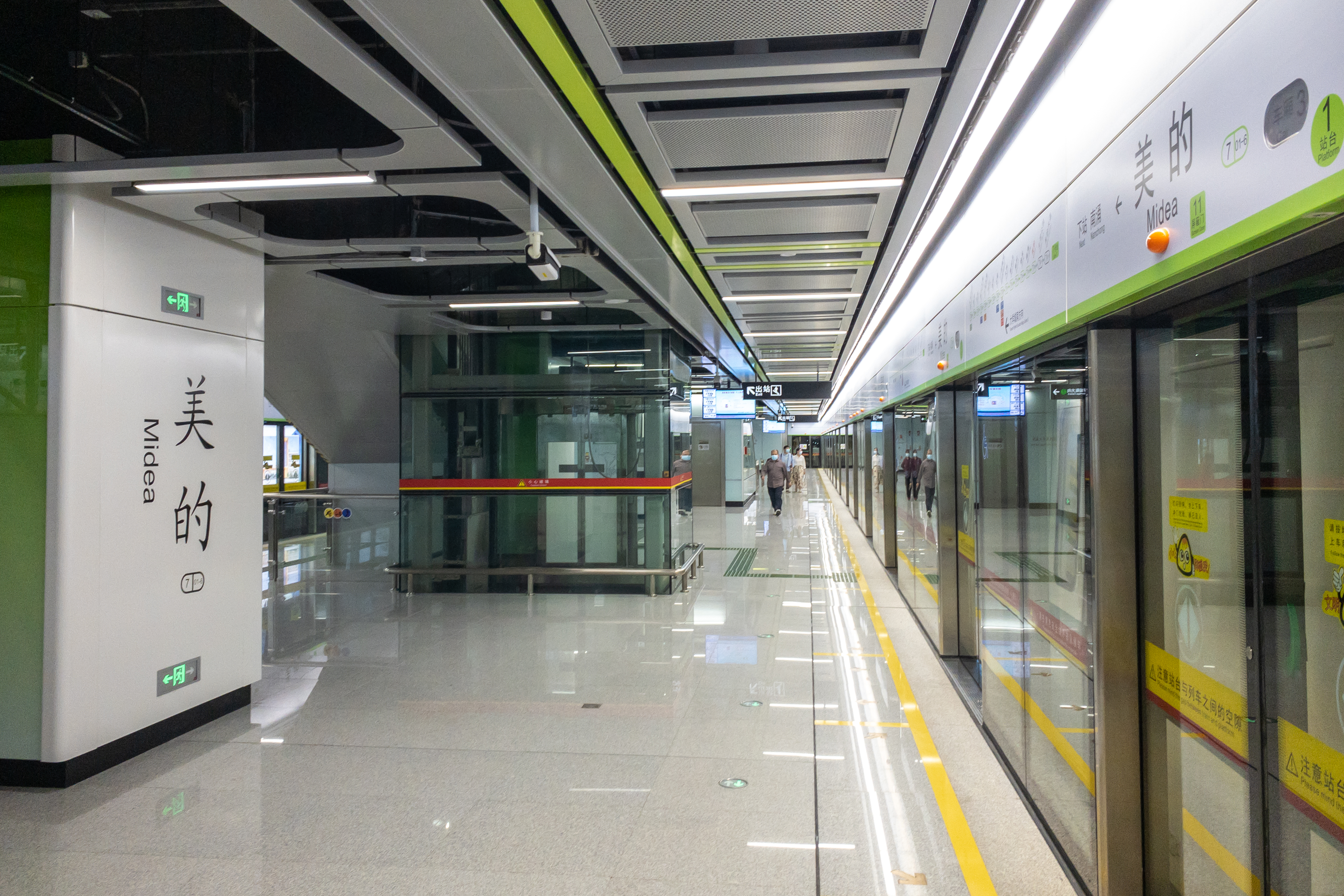
- Platform

Chinese name
- Chinese: 美的站
Transcriptions
Standard Mandarin
- Hanyu Pinyin: Měidì Zhàn
Yue: Cantonese
- Yale Romanization: Méihdīk Jaahm
- Jyutping: mei^{5}dik^{1} zaam^{6}

General information
- Location: Northwest side of the intersection between Shunde Avenue (顺德大道) and Midea Avenue (美的大道), Beijiao Subdistrict, Shunde District, Foshan, Guangdong; China
- Coordinates: 22°56′10.64″N 113°13′17.36″E
- Operator: Guangzhou Metro Group
- Line: Line 7
- Platforms: 2 (1 island platform)
- Tracks: 2

Construction
- Structure type: Underground
- Accessible: Yes

Other information
- Station code: 701-6

History
- Opened: 1 May 2022 (4 years ago)
- Former names: Lintou (林头)

Services
Preceding station	Guangzhou Metro	Following station
Beijiao Park towards Meidi Dadao	Line 7	Nanchong towards Yanshan
Location

Midea Station (Chinese: 美的站; pinyin: Měidì Zhàn; Cantonese Yale: Méihdīk Jaahm) is a station on Line 7 of Guangzhou Metro, located underground on the northwest side of the intersection between Shunde Avenue and Midea Avenue in Foshan's Shunde District. The station was opened on 1 May 2022, with the opening of the western extension of Line 7.

Midea Station is named because it is close to Midea Group's headquarters and thus have exhibition installations sponsored by the group in the concourse for visitors to take photos and interact with. Although Guangzhou's subway station naming rules prohibit the names of commercial organizations from being used in station naming, this station is not in Guangzhou but in Foshan and is not subject to this restriction. Therefore, it is the first and possibly the only station in the Guang-Fo metro network that is entirely named after a commercial organization.

== Station layout ==
G	Street level	Exits A, B1, B2, C
L1; Concourse	Lobby	Ticket Machines, Customer Service, Shops, Police Station, Security Facilities
L2; Platforms	Platform 2	7 towards Meidi Dadao (Beijiao Park)
L2; Platforms	Island platform, doors will open on the left (Toilets, Nursery)
L2; Platforms	Platform 1	7 towards Yanshan (Nanchong)

=== Entrances/exits ===
The station has 4 points of entry/exit, of which Exit B1 opened on 31 March 2023. Exits A and C are equipped with elevators.

- A: Midea Avenue
- B1: Midea Avenue
- B2: Midea Avenue
- C: China National Highway 105
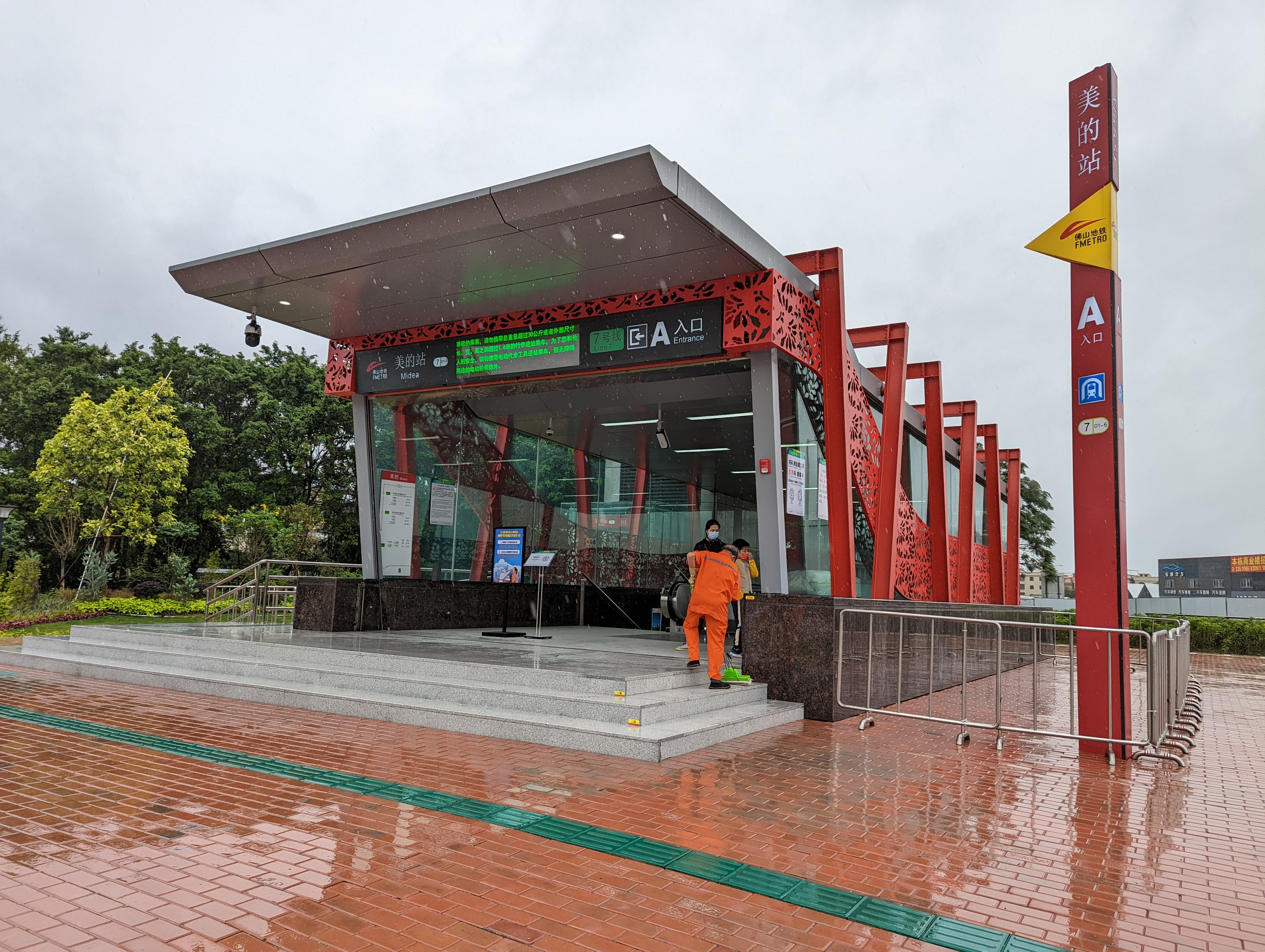
Entrance A

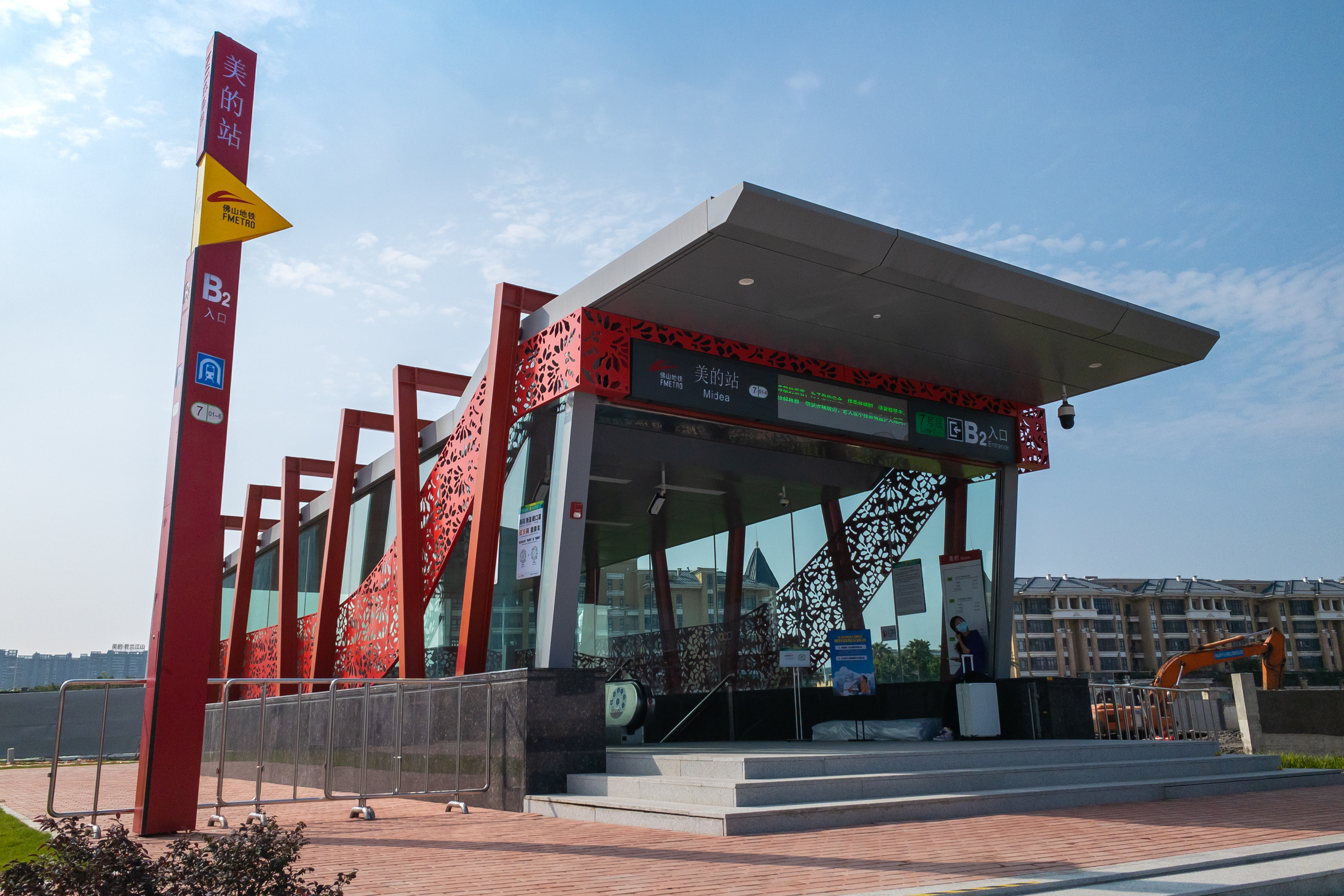
Entrance B2

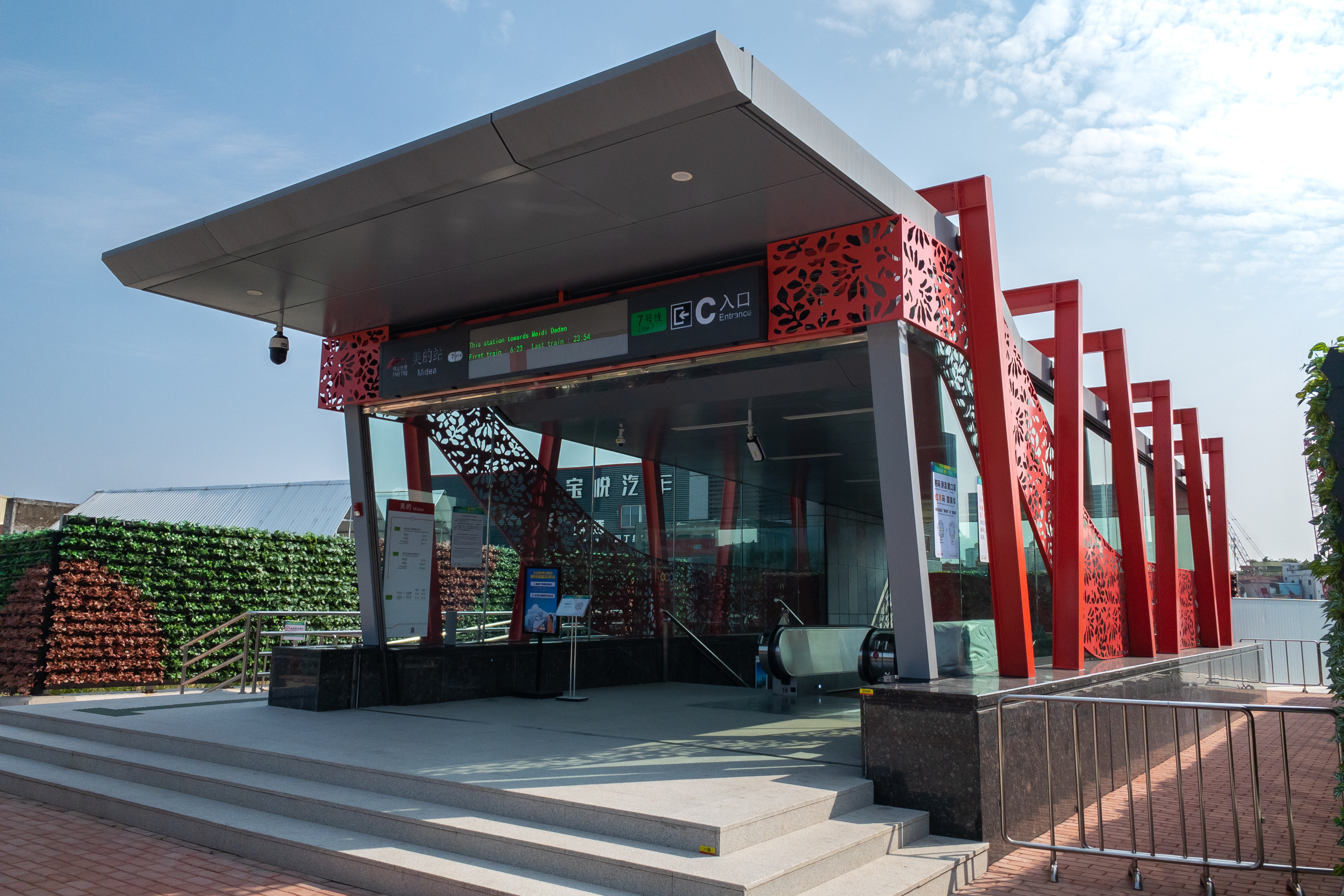
Entrance C

== Gallery ==
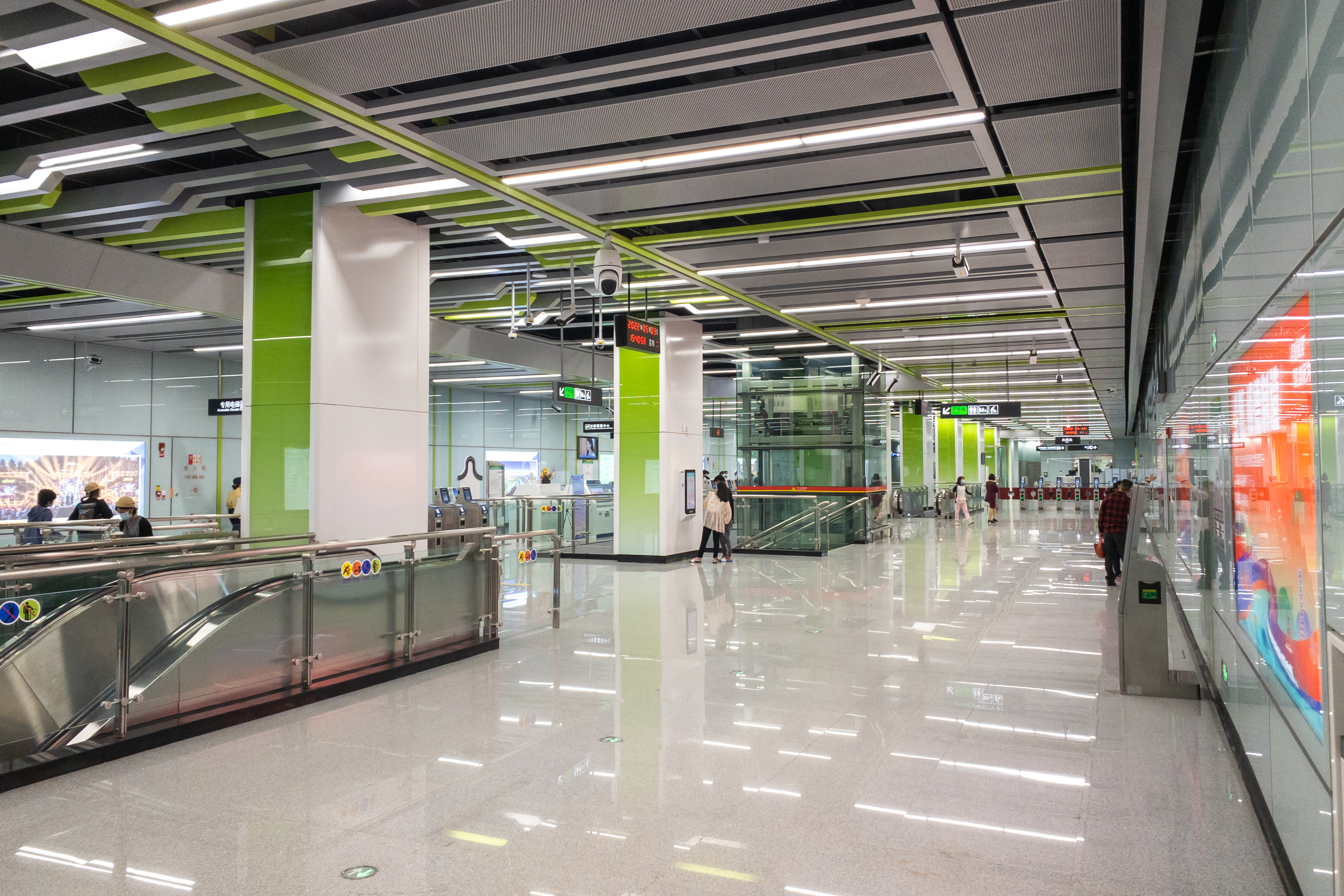
Concourse

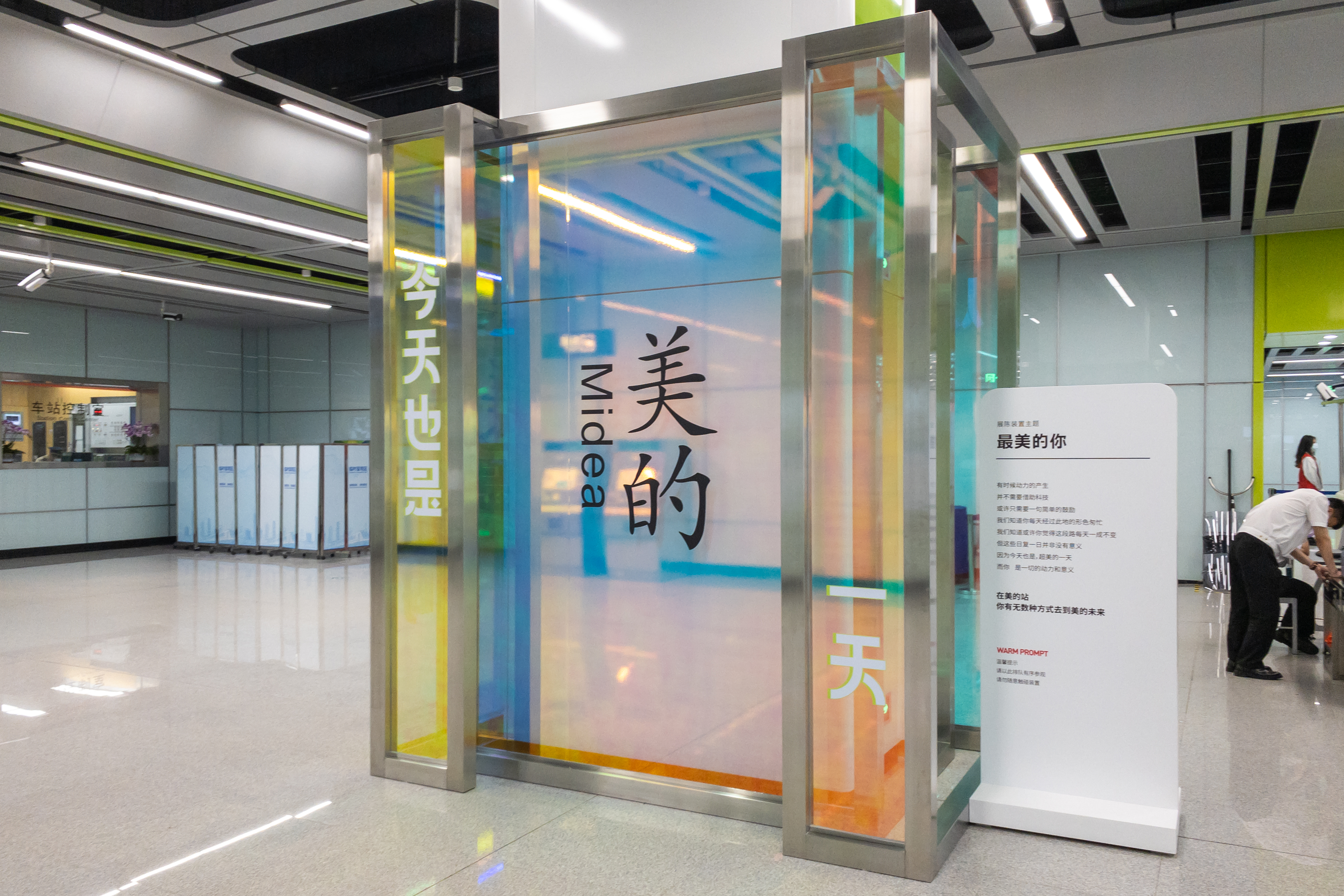
"The Most Beautiful You" exhibition installation

== History ==
The south side of this station is Lintou Village, so the station was named Lintou station during the planning and construction phase. The main structure topped out on 25 August 2019. In 2021, the station was named Midea station.

The station completed the "three rights" transfer on 12 November 2021. It opened on 1 May 2022 with the western extension of Line 7.

During COVID-19 pandemic control rules at the end of 2022, due to the impact of prevention and control measures, station service was suspended from 28 to the afternoon of 30 November 2022.
