= Nanchong station =

Guangzhou Metro Line 7 station

Nanchong 南涌
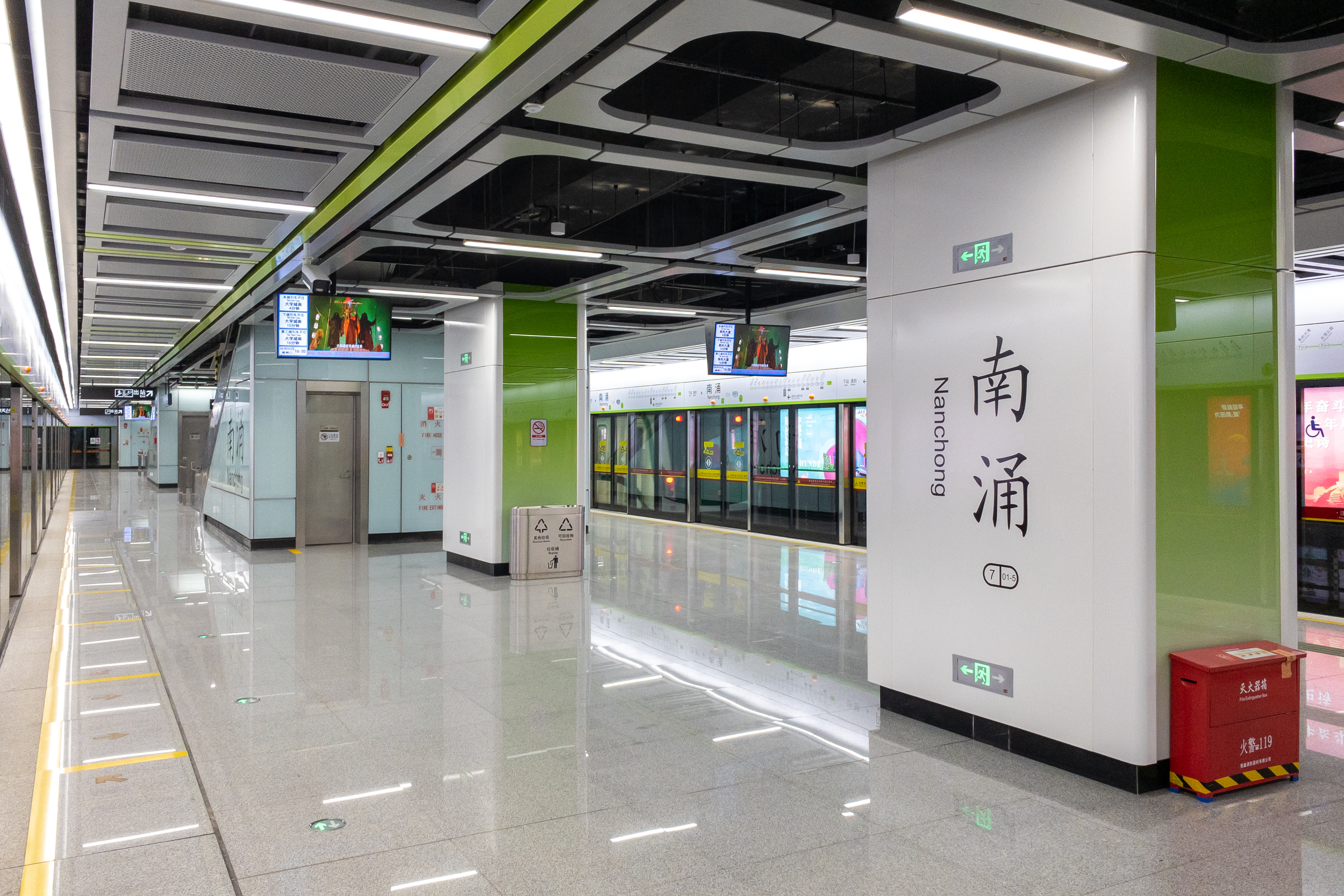
- Platform

Chinese name
- Chinese: 南涌站
Transcriptions
Standard Mandarin
- Hanyu Pinyin: Nánchōng Zhàn
Yue: Cantonese
- Yale Romanization: Nàahmchūng Jaahm
- Jyutping: Naam^{4}cung^{1} Zaam^{6}

General information
- Location: Shunde Avenue (顺德大道) west of Lintou Bridge (林头桥), Chencun Subdistrict, Shunde District, Foshan, Guangdong; China
- Coordinates: 22°56′30.52″N 113°13′58.19″E
- Operator: Guangzhou Metro Group
- Line: Line 7
- Platforms: 2 (1 island platform)
- Tracks: 2

Construction
- Structure type: Underground
- Accessible: Yes

Other information
- Station code: 701-5

History
- Opened: 1 May 2022 (4 years ago)

Services
Preceding station	Guangzhou Metro	Following station
Midea towards Meidi Dadao	Line 7	Jinlong towards Yanshan
Location

Nanchong Station (Chinese: 南涌站; pinyin: Nánchōng Zhàn; Cantonese Yale: Nàahmchūng Jaahm) is a station on Line 7 of Guangzhou Metro, located underground on Shunde Avenue west of Lintou Bridge in Foshan's Shunde District. The station was opened on 1 May 2022, with the opening of the western extension of Line 7.

== Station layout ==
G	Street level	Exits A, B, C
L1; Concourse	Lobby	Ticket Machines, Customer Service, Shops, Police Station, Security Facilities
L2; Platforms	Platform 2	7 towards Meidi Dadao (Midea)
L2; Platforms	Island platform, doors will open on the left (Toilets, Nursery)
L2; Platforms	Platform 1	7 towards Yanshan (Jinlong)

=== Entrances/exits ===
The station has 3 points of entry/exit. Exit C is equipped with an elevator.

- A: China National Highway 105
- B: China National Highway 105
- C: China National Highway 105
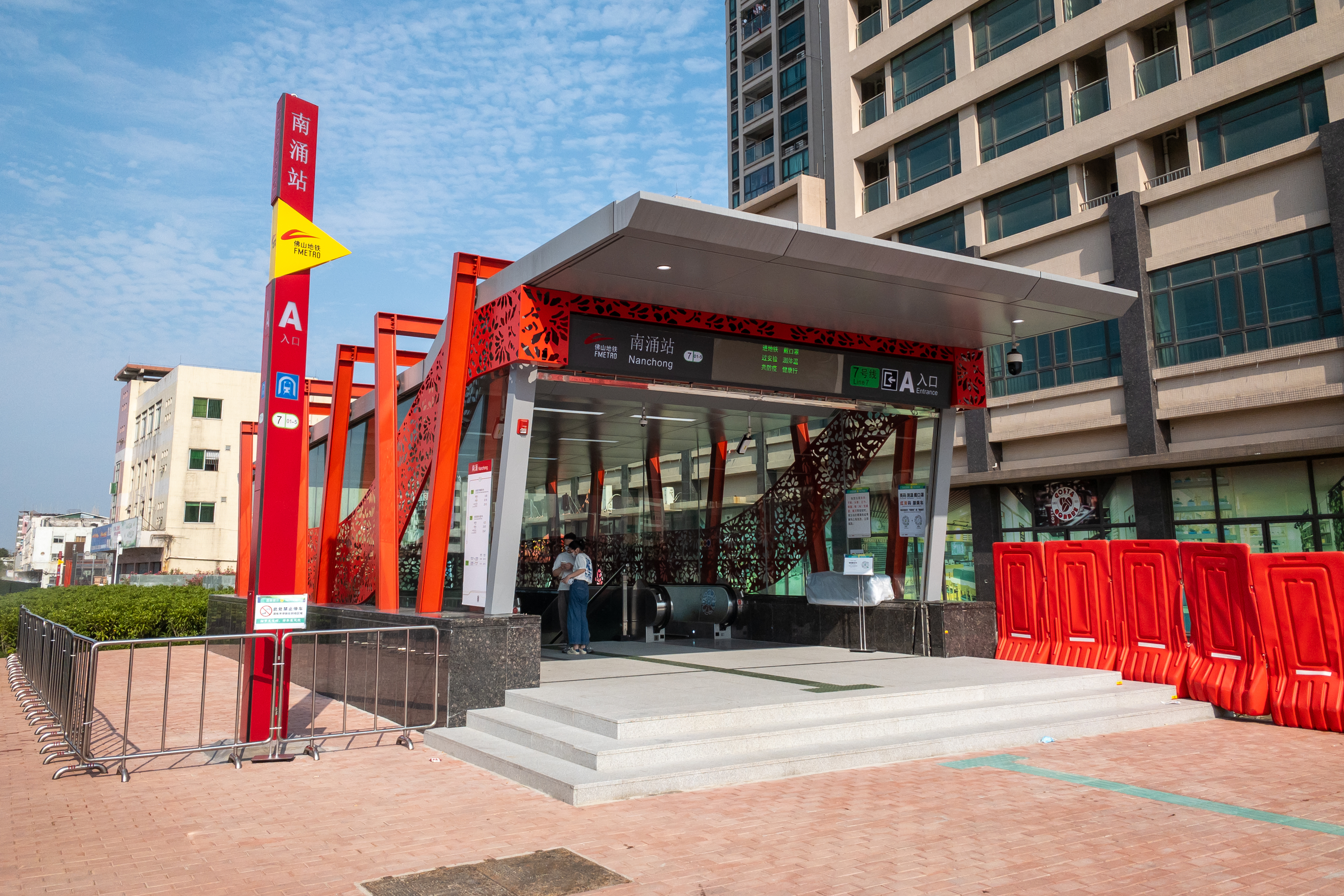
Entrance A

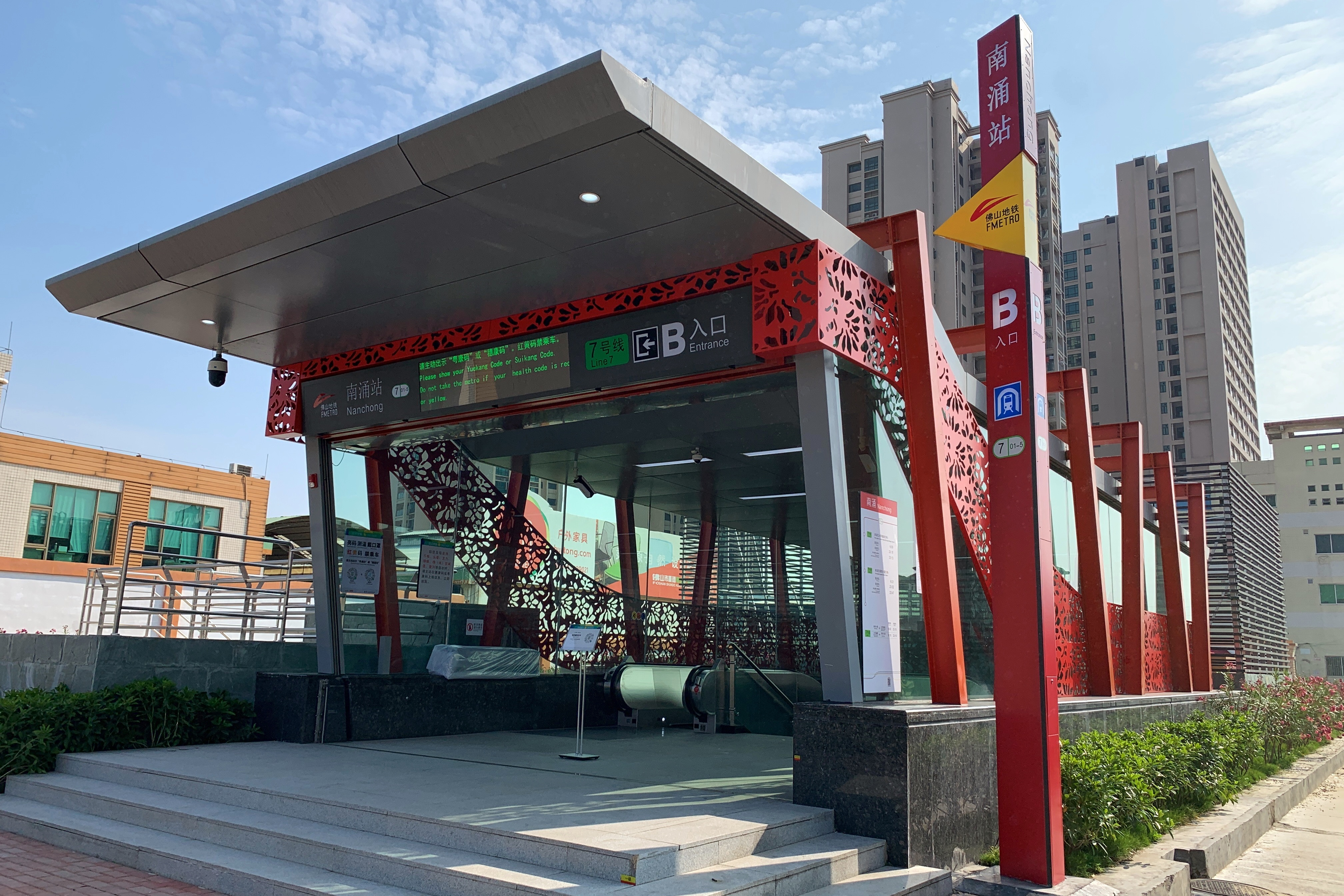
Entrance B

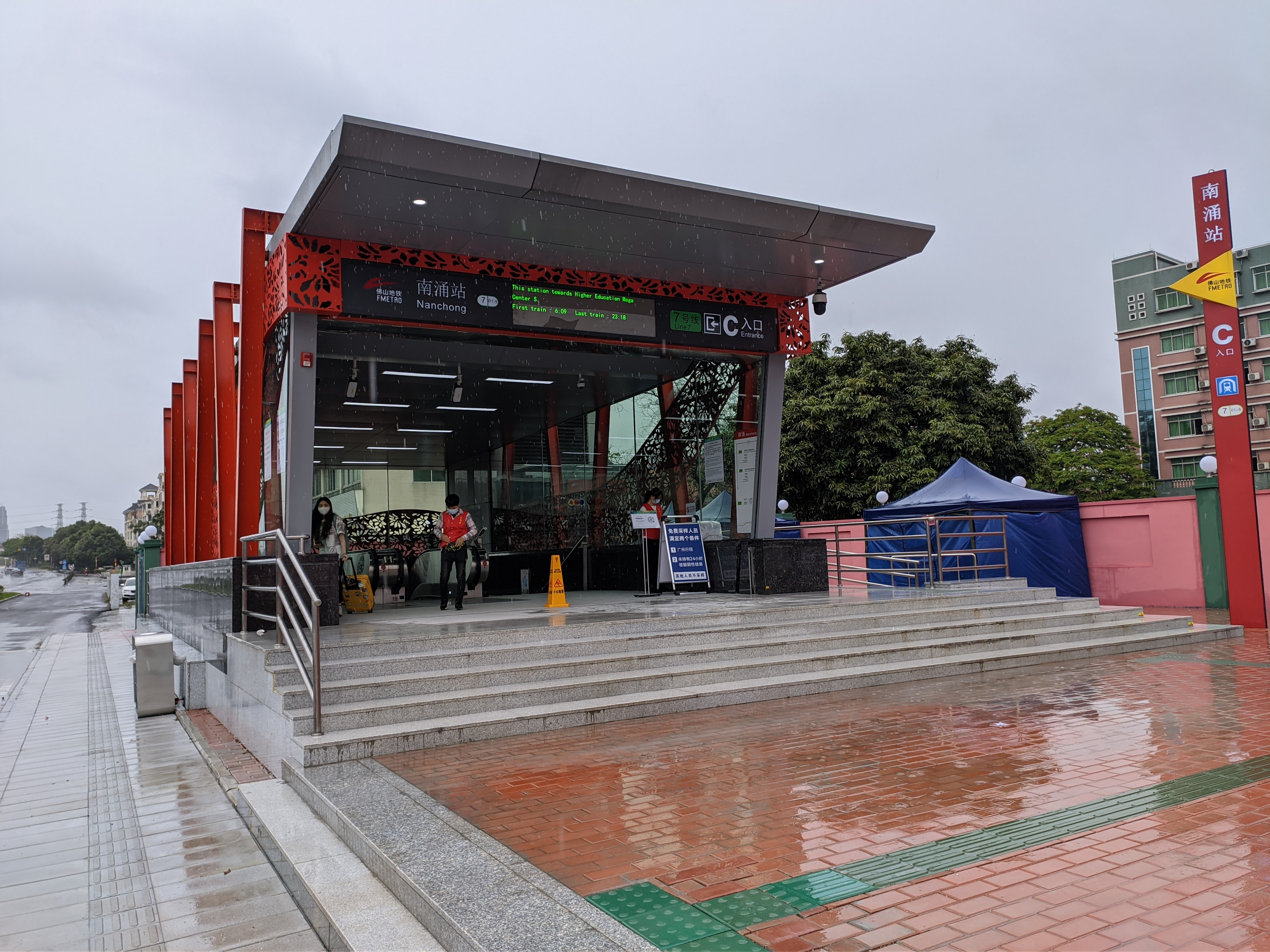
Entrance C

== Gallery ==
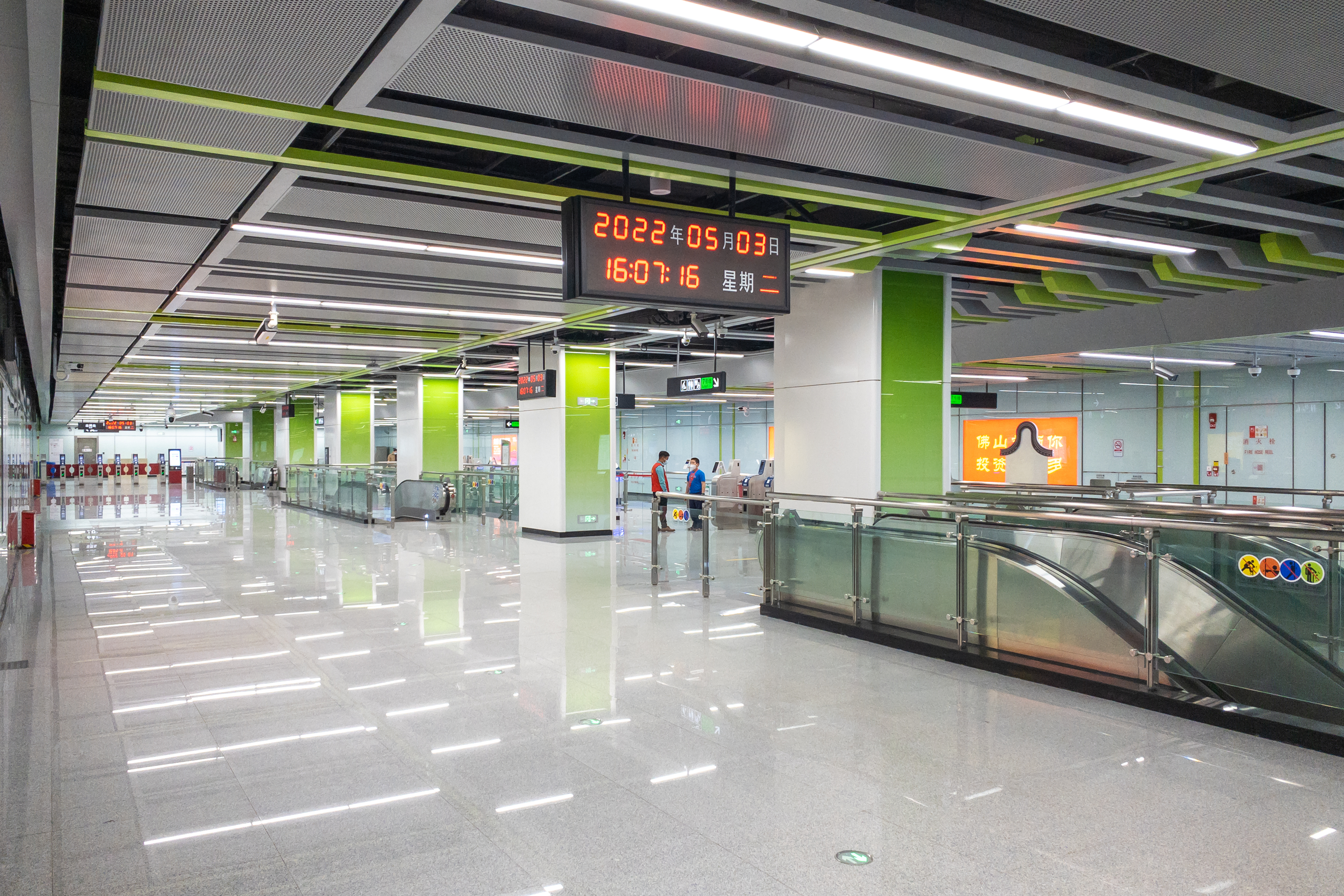
Concourse

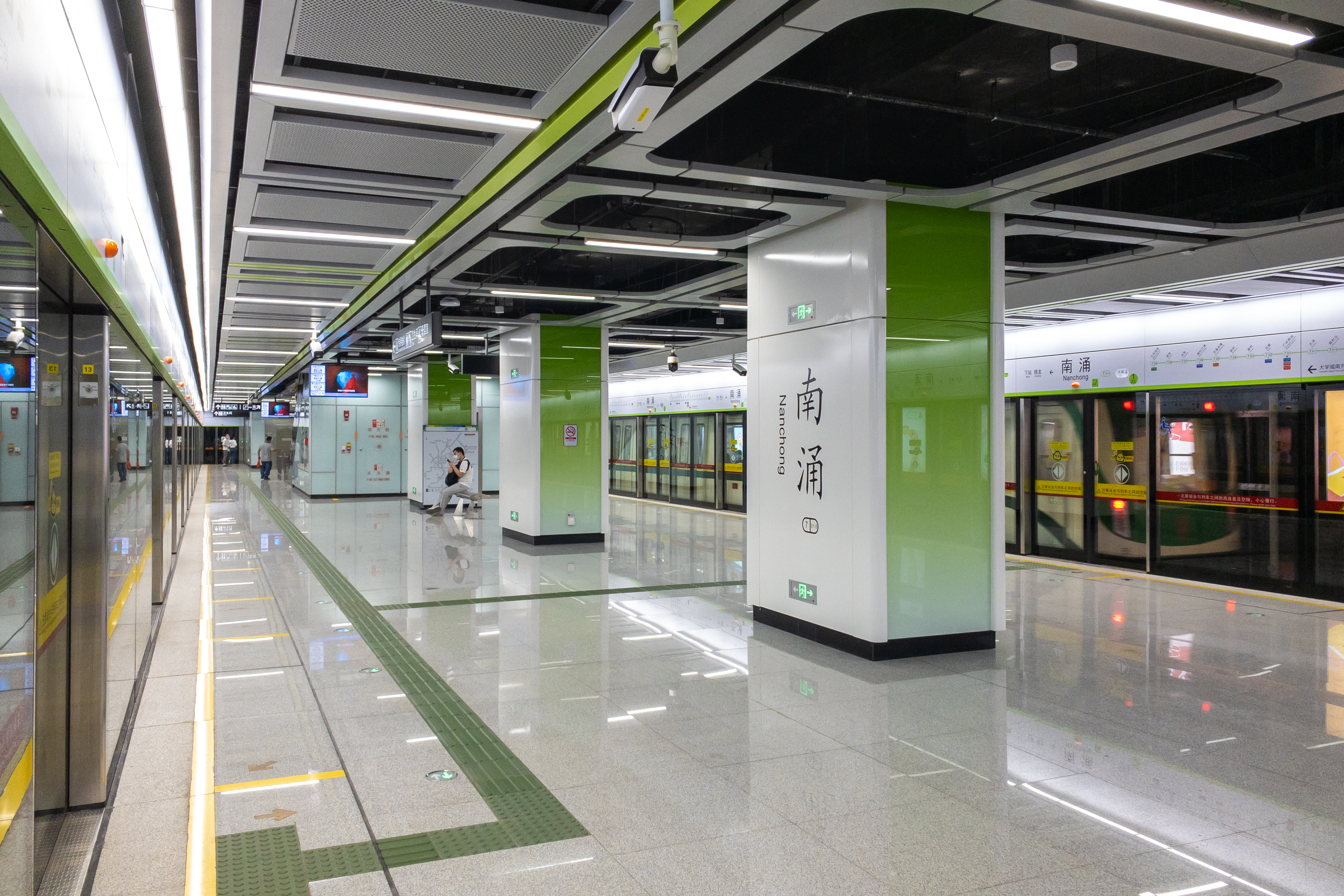
Alternate platform view

== History ==
The station structure topped out on 27 November 2019. The station completed the "three rights" transfer on 12 November 2021. It opened on 1 May 2022 with the western extension of Line 7.

During COVID-19 pandemic control rules at the end of 2022, due to the impact of prevention and control measures, station service was suspended from 28 to the afternoon of 30 November 2022.
