= Zhangbei station =

Metro station in Shenzhen, China

Zhangbei 嶂背
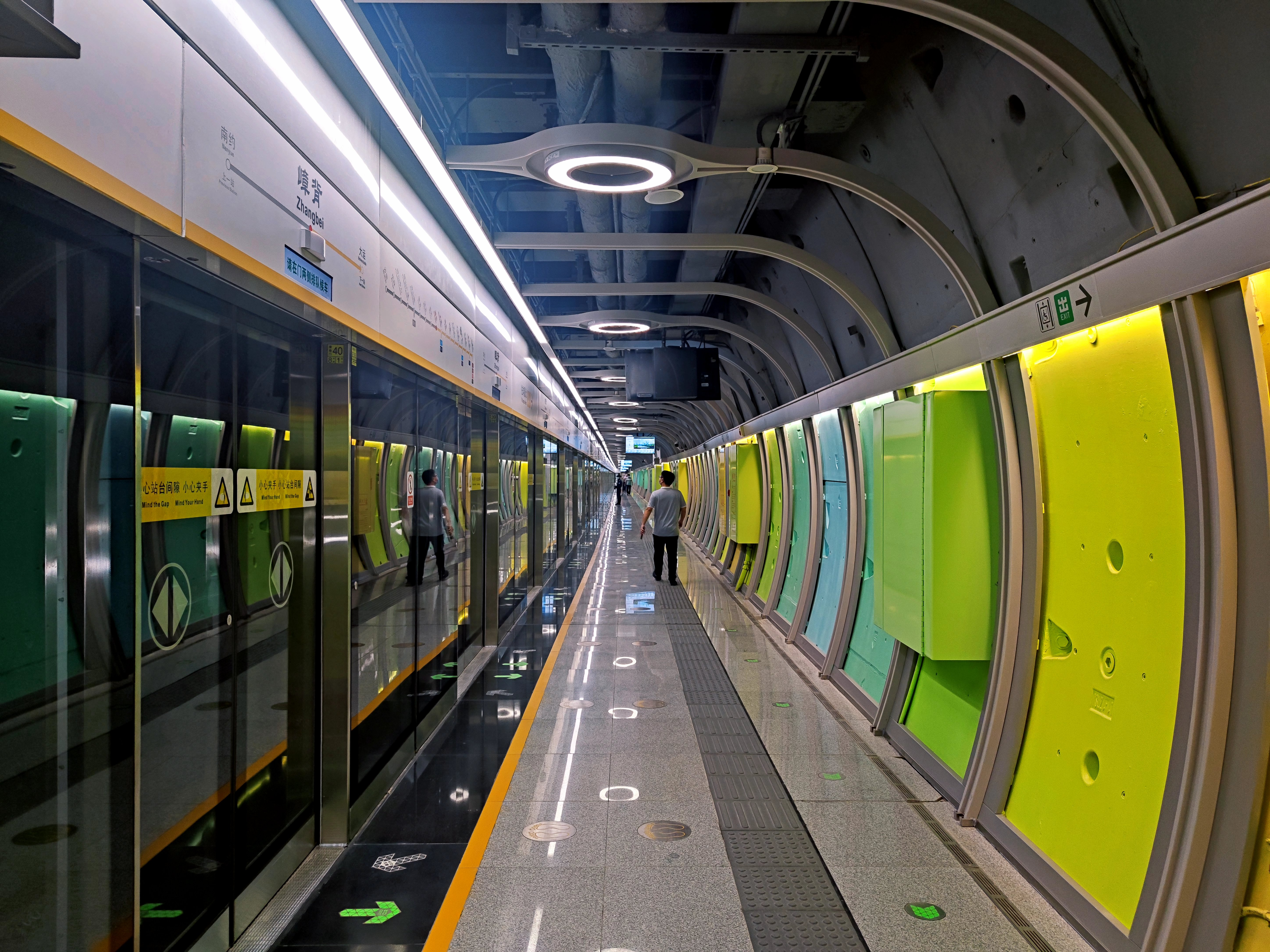
- Platform

General information
- Location: Shenzhen, Guangdong; China
- Coordinates: 22.6952°N 114.2451°E
- Operated by: SZMC (Shenzhen Metro Group)
- Line: Line 14
- Platforms: 2 (2 side platforms)
- Tracks: 2

Construction
- Structure type: Underground
- Accessible: Yes

History
- Opened: 28 October 2022

Services
Preceding station	Shenzhen Metro	Following station
Universiade towards Gangxia North	Line 14	Nanyue towards Shatian
Location

Zhangbei station (Chinese: 嶂背站; pinyin: Zhàng Bèi Zhàn) is a station on Line 14 of Shenzhen Metro in Shenzhen, Guangdong, China, which opened on 28 October 2022. It is located in Longgang District.

== History ==
Zhangbei station, originally named as Cancer Hospital station, was added to Phase 1 of Shenzhen Metro Line 14 in January 2020. It was decided by the executive meeting of Shenzhen Municipal People's Government. At this time, the tunnel construction from Universiade to Nanyue has started. Due to the tight schedule of the construction, the constructors adopted the construction scheme of "tunnel before station", designed and applied the technology of large shield tunneling and small shield construction, that is, small shield tunneling and large shield tunneling are used to cut small shield fiberglass reinforced segments. Compared with the traditional underground excavation method, this method has higher mechanization and safety performance, low cost, fast speed, and less impact on the surrounding environment.

== Station layout ==
G Concourse	Lobby	Customer Service, Shops, Vending machines, ATMs
B1F; Platforms	Side platform, doors will open on the right
B1F; Platforms	Platform	14 towards Gangxia North (Universiade)
B1F; Platforms	Platform	14 towards Shatian (Nanyue)
B1F; Platforms	Side platform, doors will open on the right

== Exits ==
Exit	Destination
Exit A	North side of Zhangbei Road, South side of Baohe Roads, Cancer Hospital Chinese Academy of Medical Sciences Shenzhen Center
Exit B	North side of Zhangbei Road, South side of Baohe Roads, Cancer Hospital Chinese Academy of Medical Sciences Shenzhen Center

== Gallery ==
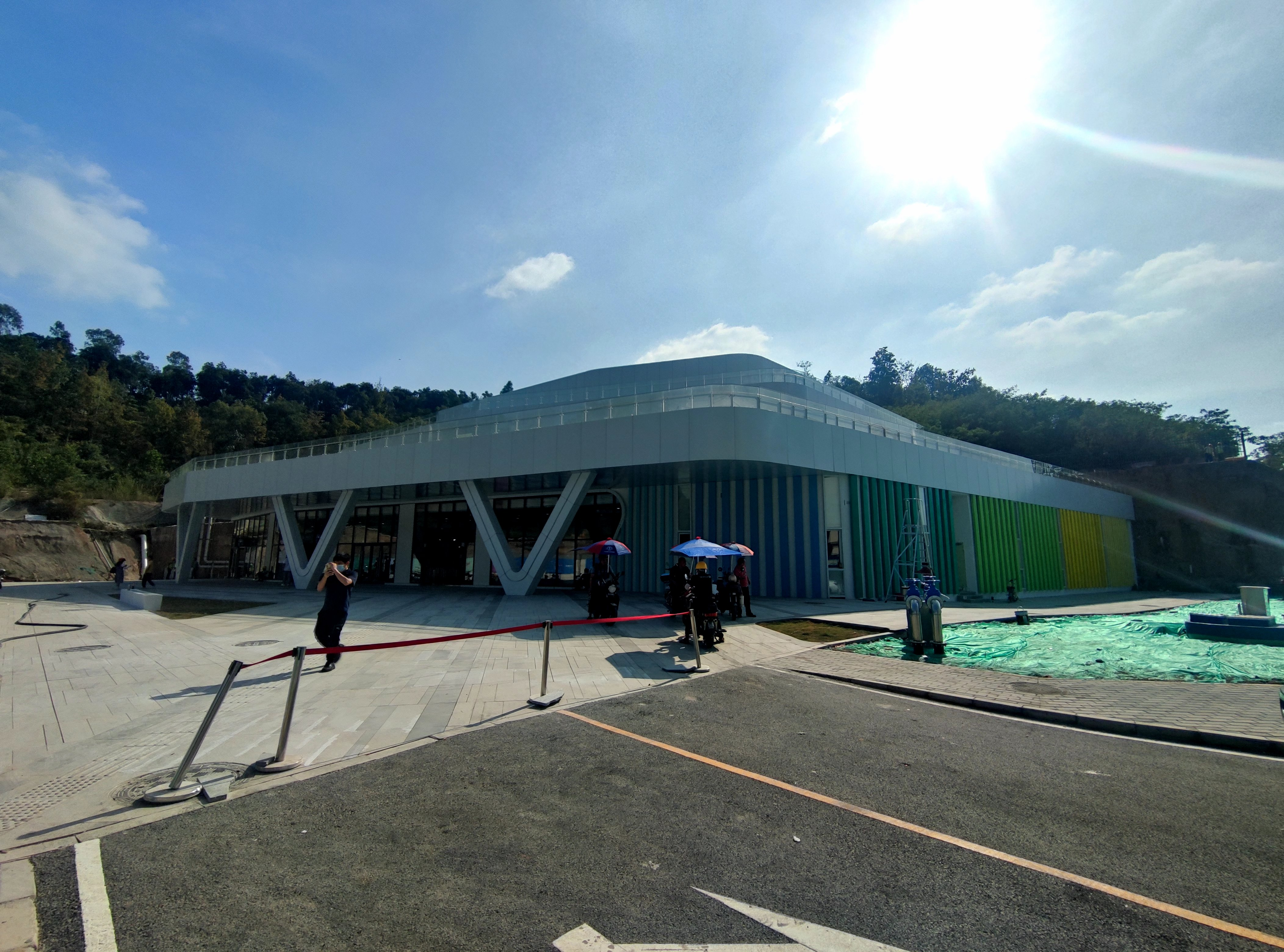
Outside the station

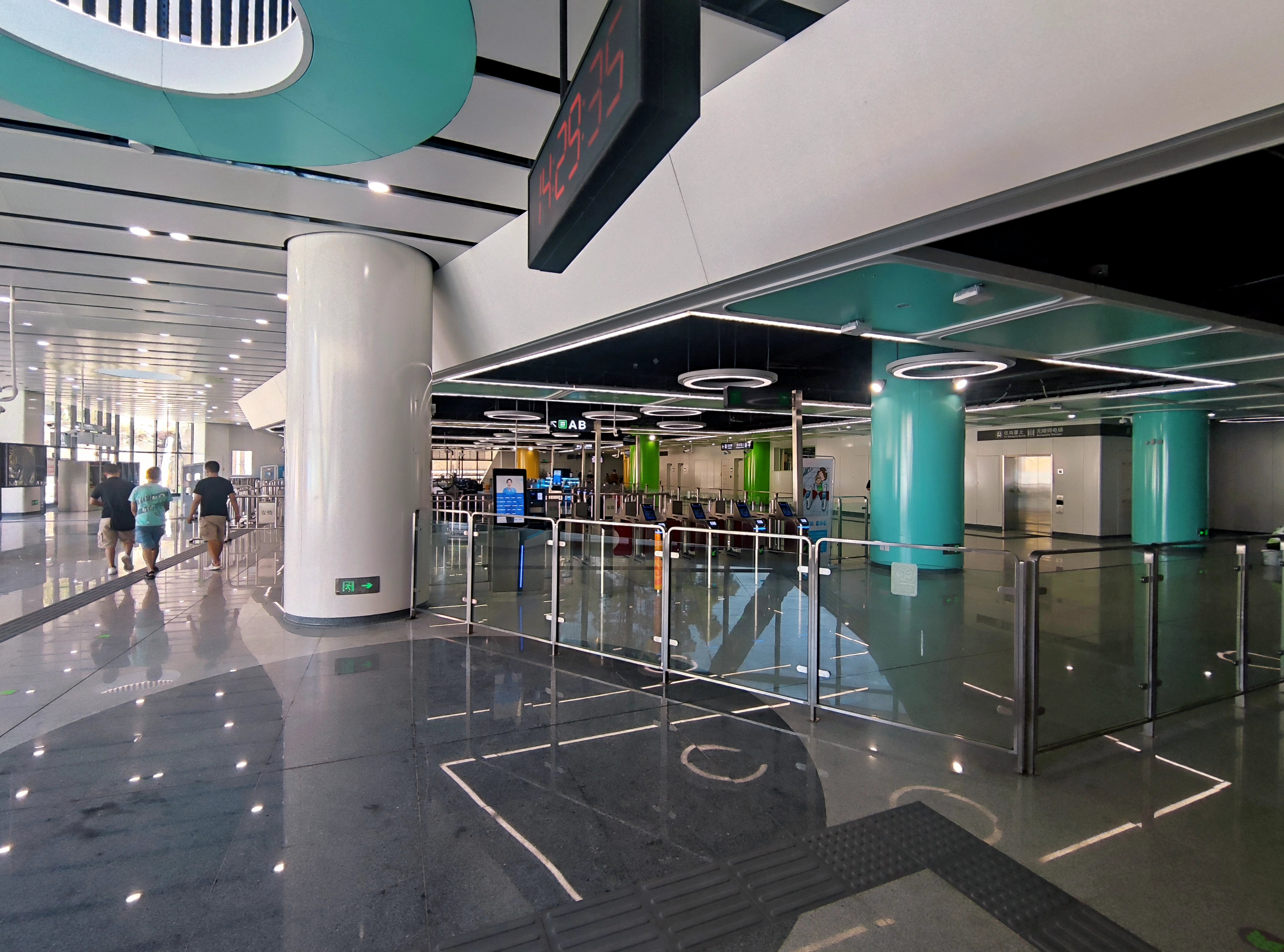
Concourse

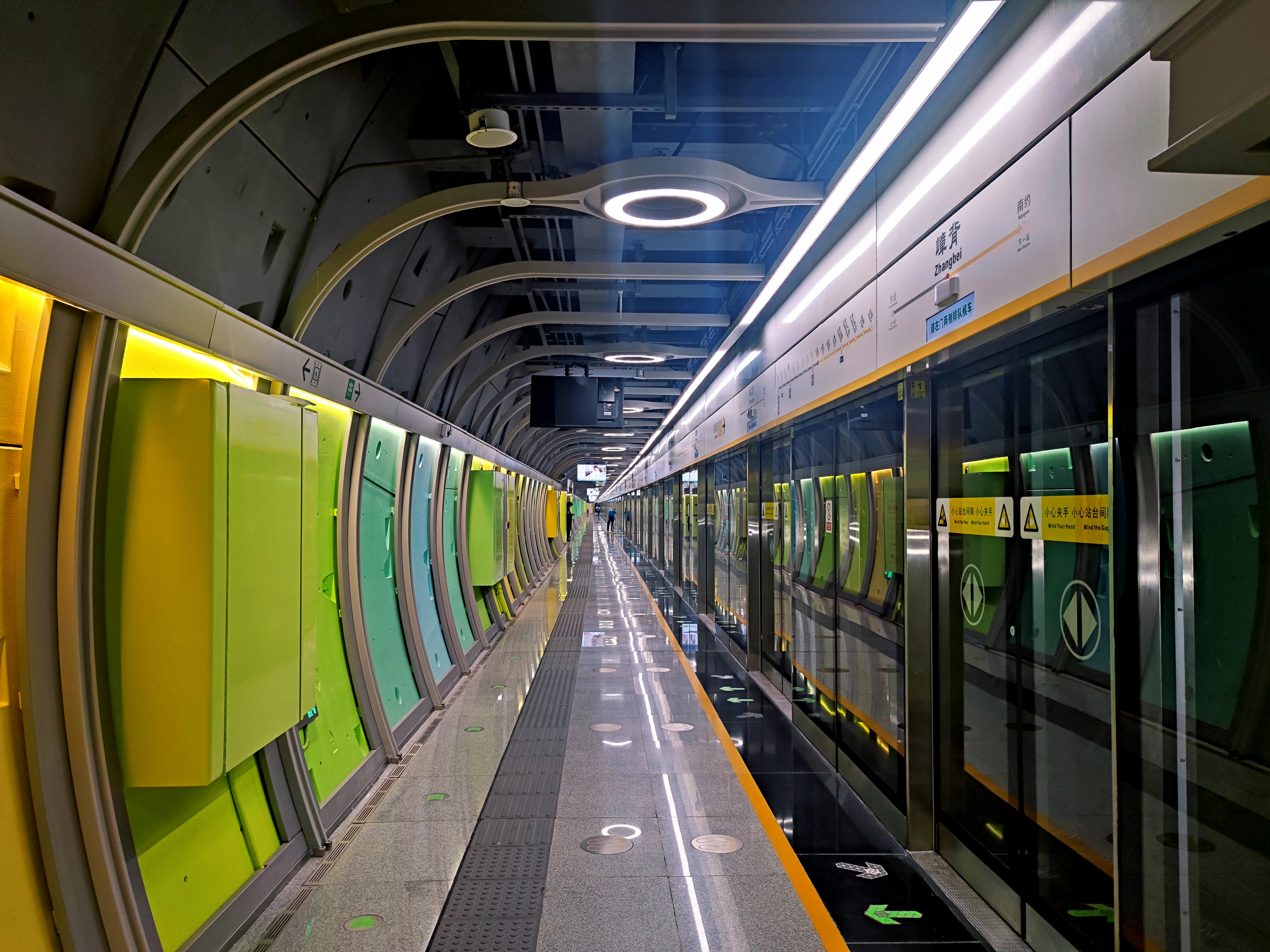
Line 14 platform towards Shatian

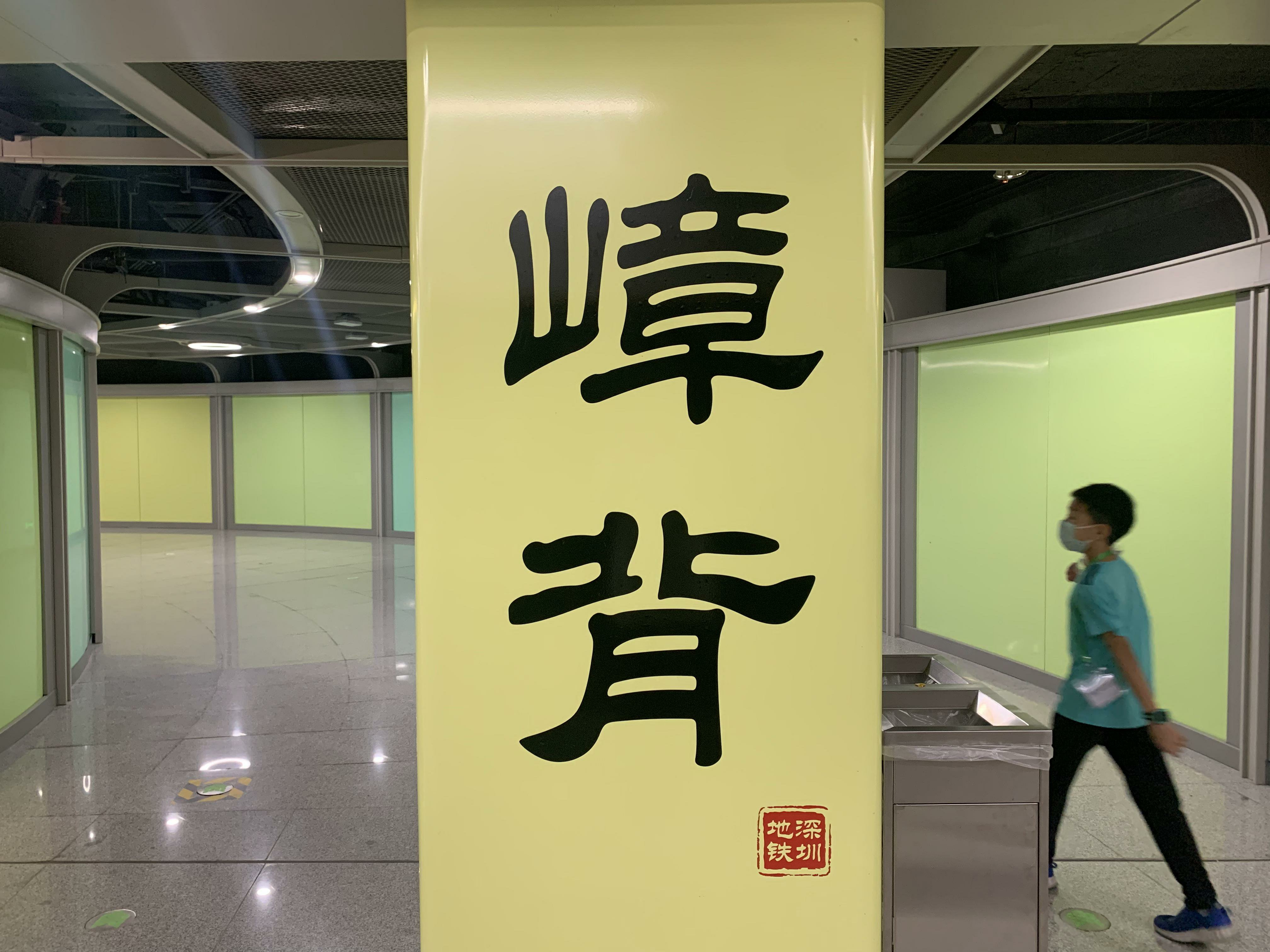
Platform calligraphy
