= Polarsun Century =

Chinese automobile

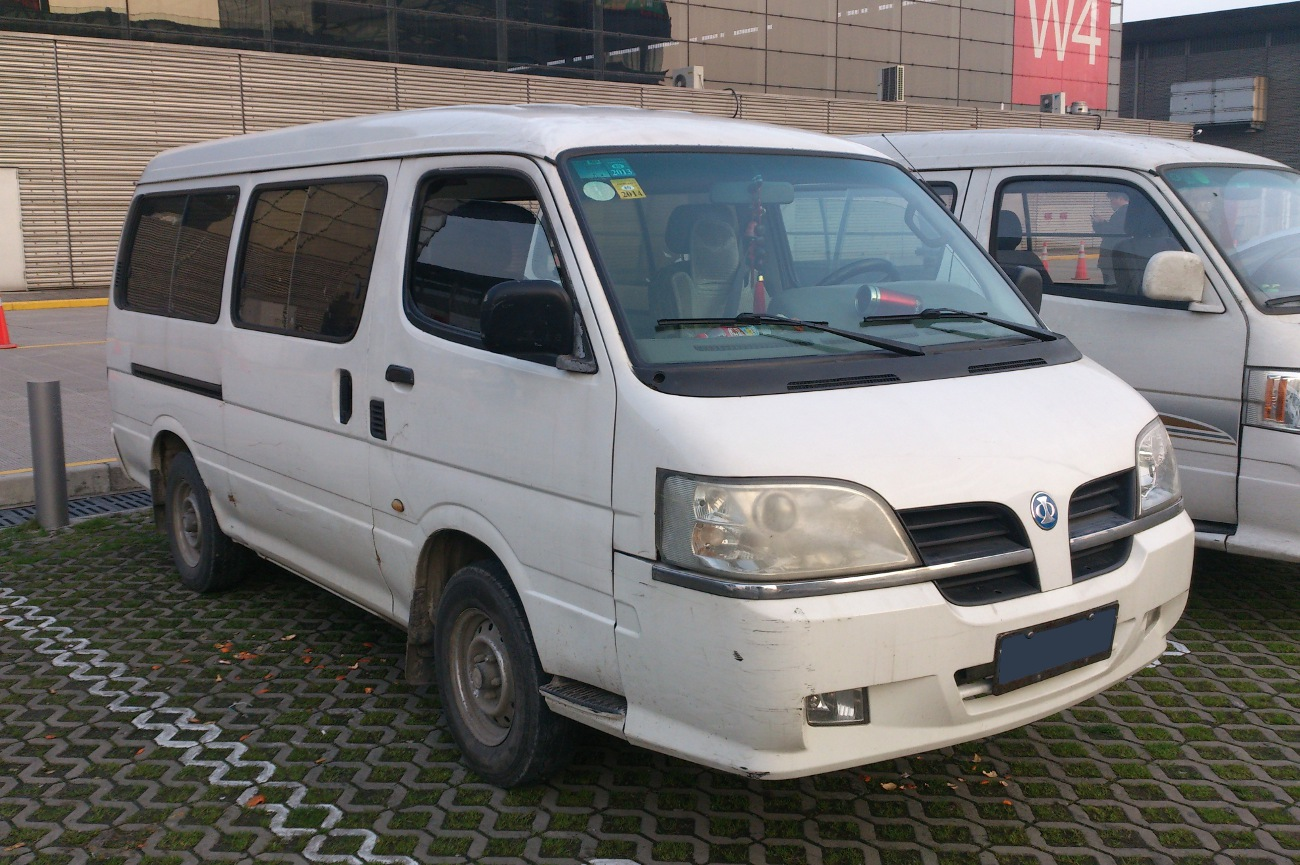

Overview
- Production: 2005–2009
- Assembly: Shenyang, Liaoning, China

Body and chassis
- Body style: 5-door van
- Layout: Front engine, rear-wheel-drive; Front engine, four-wheel-drive
- Related: Toyota HiAce; Jinbei Haise; Foton View; Groz Polarsun (Ukraine); Jiangnan JNQ6495D1 (PRC); Sunlong SLK5030 (China); King Long Kingwin; Kingstar Pluto B6; BAW B6 (China); Tianqi Meiya Haishi (China); Great Wall Proteus

Powertrain
- Engine: 2.2 L (491Q-ME) I4 (petrol); 2.7 L (3RZ-E) I4 (petrol)
- Transmission: 4-speed automatic (A340E and others); 5-speed manual

Dimensions
- Wheelbase: 2,590–2,890 mm (102.0–113.8 in) 5070/1700/2066
- Length: 5,010 mm (197.2 in)
- Width: 1,700 mm (66.9 in)
- Height: 2,066 mm (81.3 in)

The Polarsun Century is a light commercial van produced by the Chinese automobile manufacturer Polarsun Automobile from 2005 to 2009.

== History ==
On February 11, 2007, 500 Polarsun Century vans were exported to South Africa.

== Design ==
The Polarsun Century was based on the fourth generation Toyota HiAce with a completely restyled front fascia and a slightly redesigned rear while the rest of the vehicle was built based on a licensed Toyota HiAce production with interchangeable parts within the shared platforms. It was produced from 2005 to 2009 with prices ranging from 49,980 to 89,800 yuan.

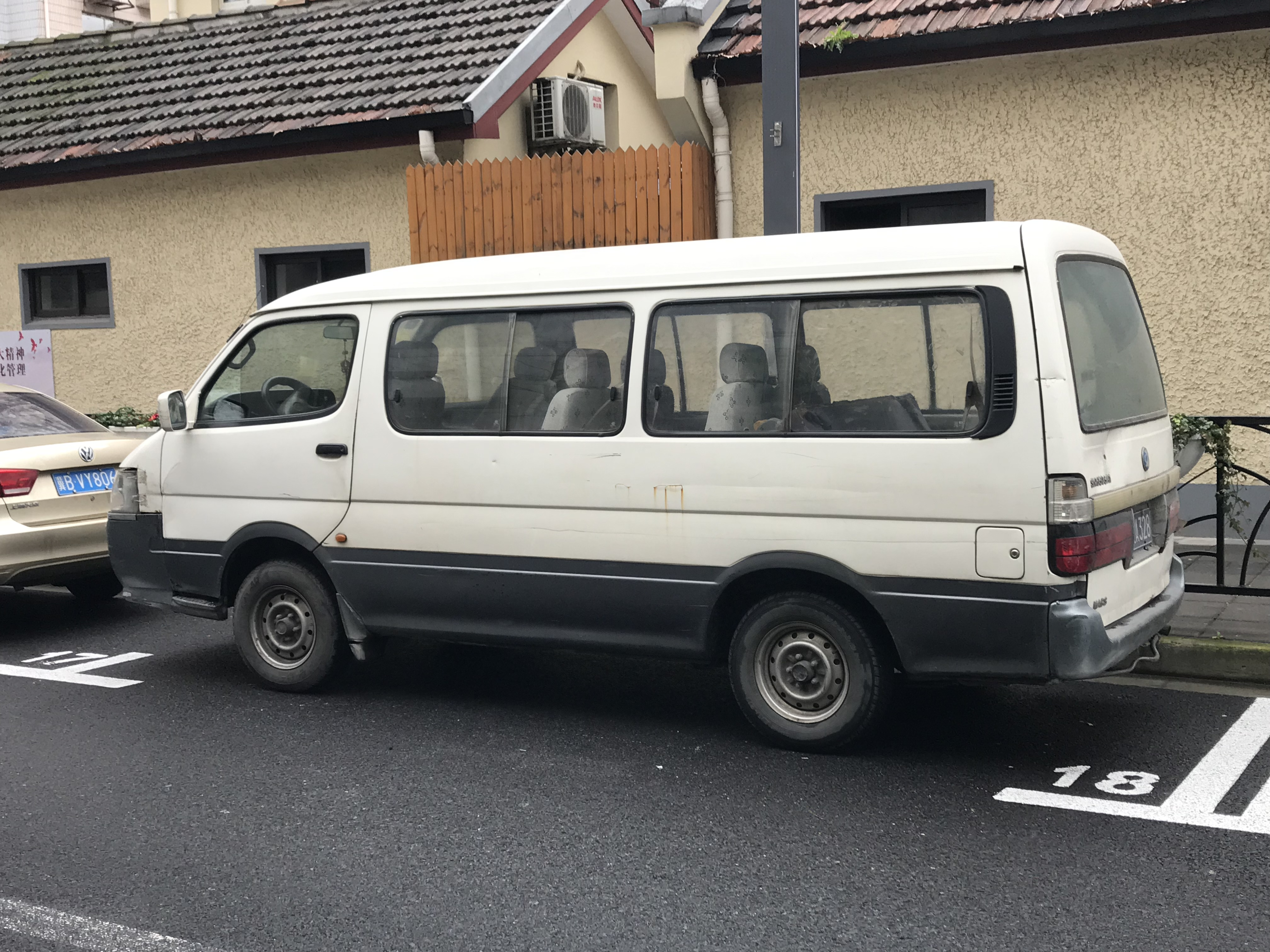
Polarsun Century rear
