= Nanyue station =

Metro station in Shenzhen, China

Nanyue 南约
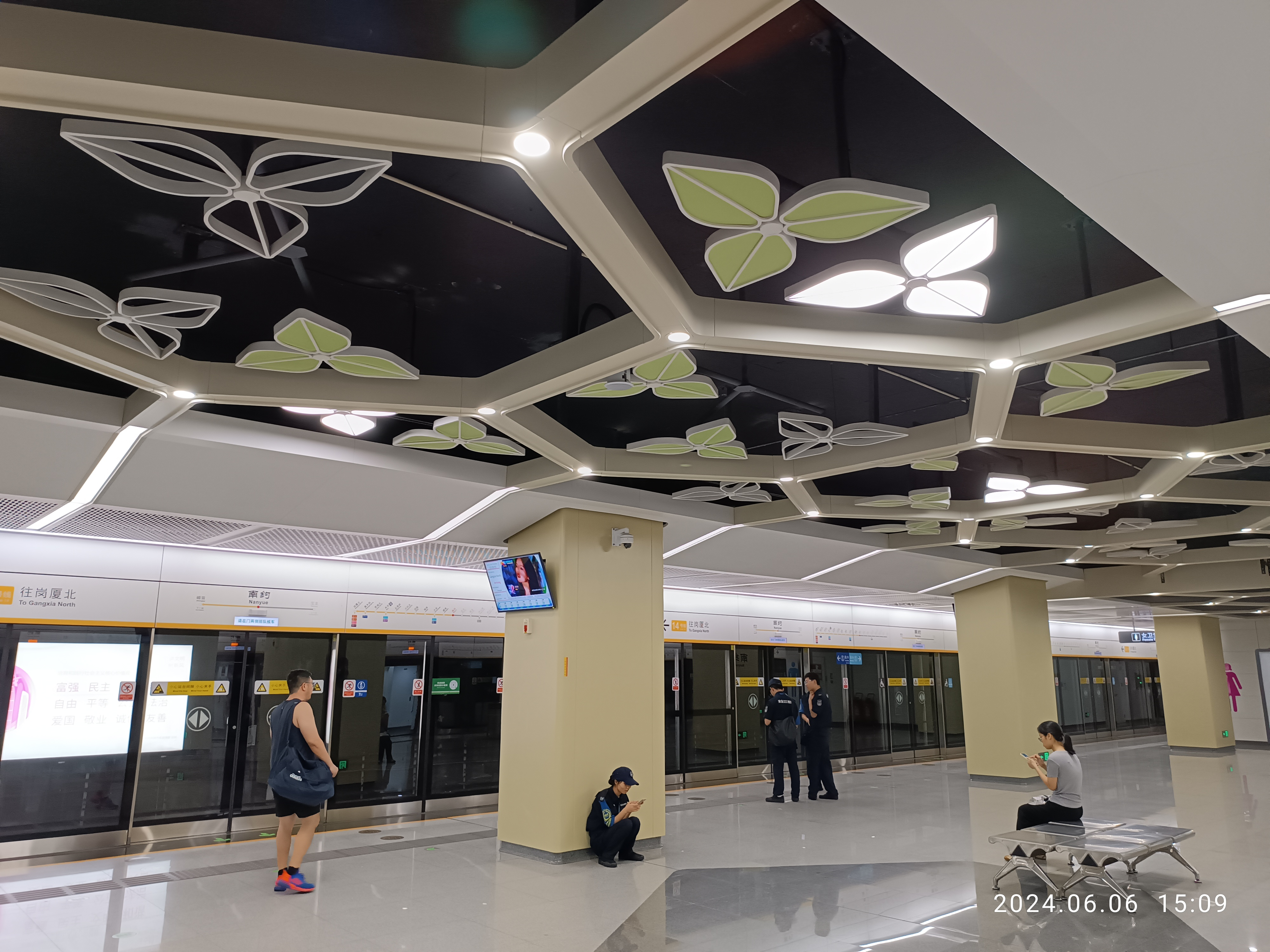
- Platform

General information
- Location: Shenzhen, Guangdong; China
- Coordinates: 22.6909°N 114.2729°E
- Operated by: SZMC (Shenzhen Metro Group)
- Line: Line 14
- Platforms: 2 (1 island platform)
- Tracks: 2

Construction
- Structure type: Underground
- Accessible: Yes

History
- Opened: 28 October 2022

Services
Preceding station	Shenzhen Metro	Following station
Zhangbei towards Gangxia North	Line 14	Baolong towards Shatian
Location

Nanyue station (Chinese: 南约站; pinyin: Nányuē Zhàn) is a station on Line 14 of Shenzhen Metro in Shenzhen, Guangdong, China, which opened on 28 October 2022. It is located in Longgang District.

== Station layout ==
G	-	Exit
B1F; Concourse	Lobby	Customer Service, Shops, Vending machines, ATMs
B2F; Platforms	Platform	14 towards Gangxia North (Zhangbei)
B2F; Platforms	Island platform, doors will open on the left
B2F; Platforms	Platform	14 towards Shatian (Baolong)

== Exits ==
Exit	Destination
Exit A	West side of Baoping Road, South side of Baohe Road (W)
Exit B	East side of Baoping Road, South side of Baohe Road (E)
Exit C	North side of Baohe Road (E)
Exit D	East side of Binxin Road, Bingkeng Community
Exit E	West side of Binxin Road, North side of Baohe Road (W)
