= Guangzhou Baolong Motors =

Chinese automobile manufacturer

Guangzhou Oriental Baolong Automotive Industry Co. Ltd. Guangzhou Baolong Motors Co. Ltd.
- Type: Private Co. Ltd.
- Industry: Automotive
- Founded: 1998
- Defunct: 2005
- Headquarters: Guangzhou, People's Republic of China
- Area served: Mainland China
- Key people: Yang Longjiang
- Products: Automobiles

Guangzhou Baolong Motors Co. Ltd., or previously Guangzhou Oriental Baolong Automotive Industry Co. Ltd., (广州宝龙) was an automobile manufacturer from the People's Republic of China.

== Company history ==
Yang Longjiang founded the company in June 1998 in Guangzhou, and began the production of automobiles under the brand name Baolong. Production took place in three plants located in Guangzhou and one plant located in Zhanjiang. By 2005, the production has ended.

In September 2005, FAW Hongta and FAW Baolong Light Vehicle joined forces to found the successor company FAW Baolong Light Vehicle.

== Vehicles ==
Initially, Baolong produced bullet-proof vehicles based on Mitsubishi V31 and V33, Ford Transit, Renault Trafic and a few other Mitsubishi models.

In April 2004, Matra bought the rights to the Renault Espace III.

Before the defunct in 2005, the lone passenger vehicle product is the Baolong Pegasus MPV. The Baolong Pegasus was later rebadged as the FAW Freewind.

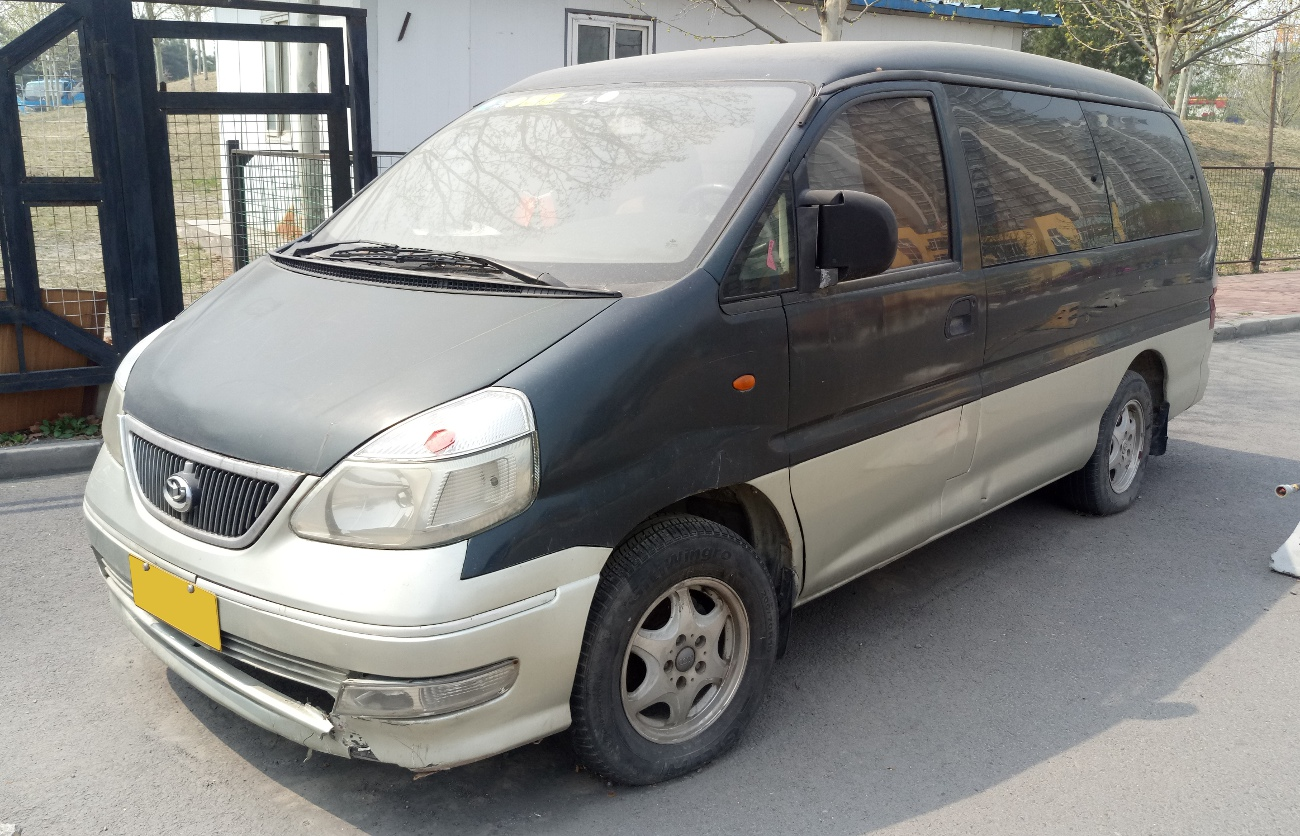
Baolong Pegasus MPV

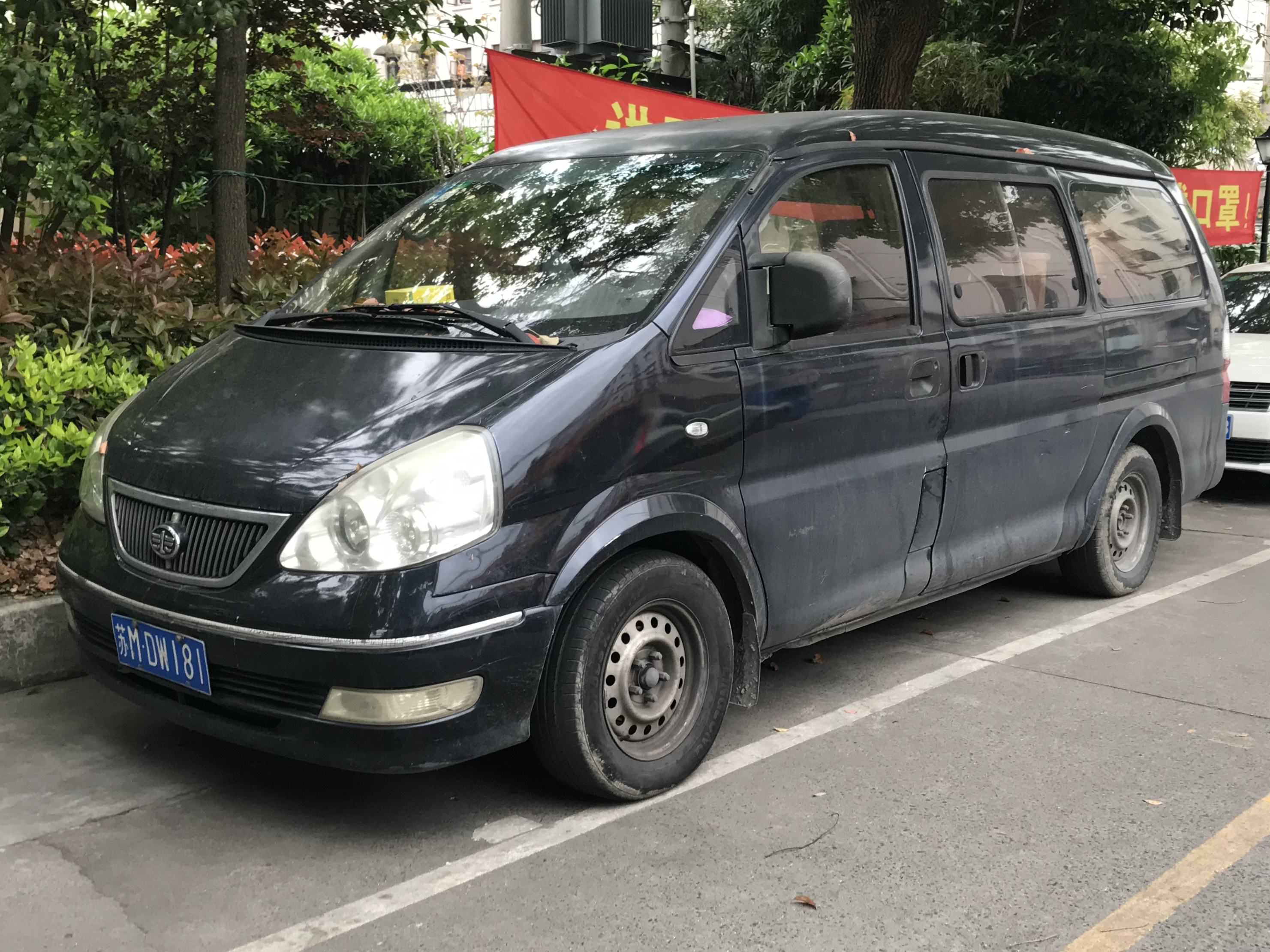
FAW Freewind

== Production ==
year	production number	source
2001	650	
2002	1348	
2003	1400	
