= Baolong station =

Metro station in Shenzhen, China

Baolong 宝龙
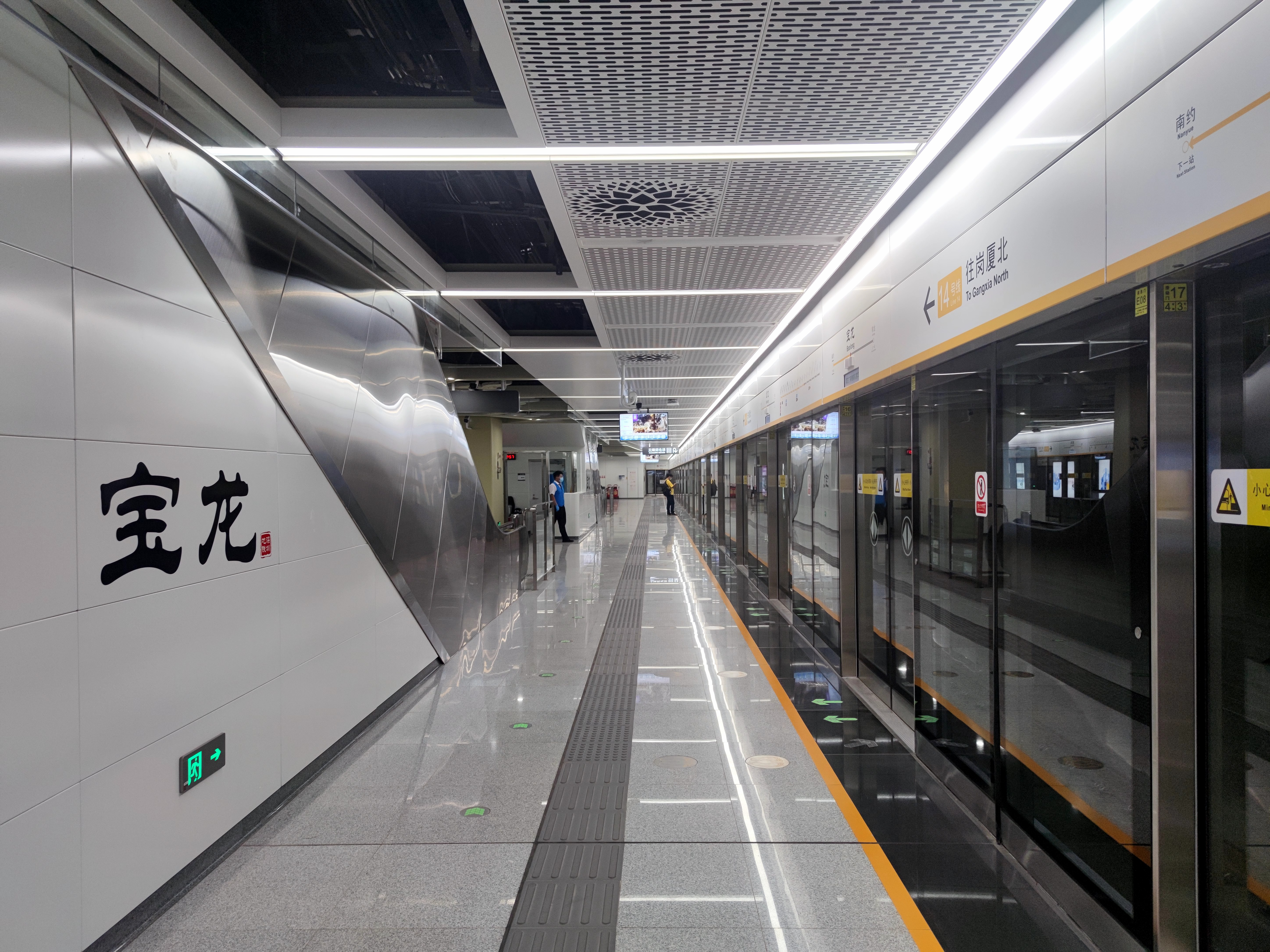
- Platform in October 2022

General information
- Location: Shenzhen, Guangdong; China
- Coordinates: 22.6912°N 114.2930°E
- Operated by: SZMC (Shenzhen Metro Group)
- Line: Line 14
- Platforms: 2 (1 island platform)
- Tracks: 2

Construction
- Structure type: Underground
- Accessible: Yes

History
- Opened: 28 October 2022

Services
Preceding station	Shenzhen Metro	Following station
Nanyue towards Gangxia North	Line 14	Jinlong towards Shatian
Location

Baolong station (Chinese: 宝龙站; pinyin: Bǎolóng Zhàn) is a station on Line 14 of Shenzhen Metro in Shenzhen, Guangdong, China, which was opened on 28 October 2022. It is located in Longgang District.

== Station layout ==
G	-	Exit
B1F; Concourse	Lobby	Customer Service, Shops, Vending machines, ATMs
B2F; Platforms	Platform	14 towards Gangxia North (Nanyue)
B2F; Platforms	Island platform, doors will open on the left
B2F; Platforms	Platform	14 towards Shatian (Jinlong)

== Exits ==
Exit	Destination
Exit A	South side of Baolong Blvd (W), West side of Baolong 4th Road (S)
Exit B	South side of Baolong Blvd (E), East side of Baolong 4th Road (S)
Exit C	North side of Baolong Blvd (E), East side of Baolong 4th Road (N), Intelligent Park
Exit D	North side of Baolong Blvd (W), West side of Baolong 4th Road (N)
