= Jinlong station (Shenzhen Metro) =

Metro station in Shenzhen, China

Jinlong 锦龙
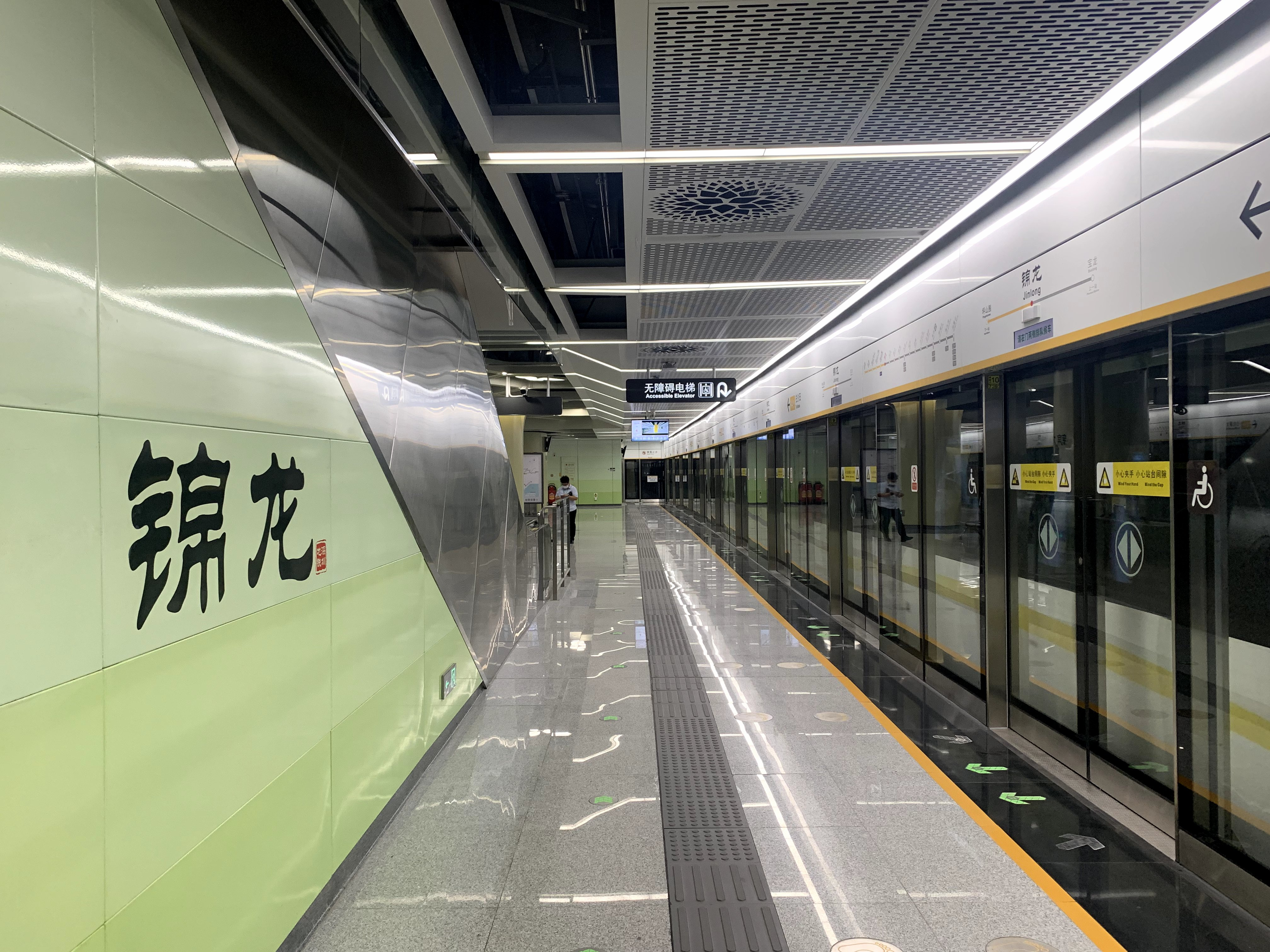
- Platform in October 2022

General information
- Location: Shenzhen, Guangdong; China
- Coordinates: 22.6829°N 114.3290°E
- Operated by: SZMC (Shenzhen Metro Group)
- Line(s): Line 14
- Platforms: 2 (1 island platform)
- Tracks: 2

Construction
- Structure type: Underground
- Accessible: Yes

History
- Opened: 28 October 2022

Services
Preceding station	Shenzhen Metro	Following station
Baolong towards Gangxia North	Line 14	Pingshanwei towards Shatian

Jinlong station (Chinese: 锦龙站; pinyin: Jǐnlóng Zhàn) is a station on Line 14 of Shenzhen Metro in Shenzhen, Guangdong, China, which opened on 28 October 2022. It is located in Pingshan District.

== Exits ==
Exit		Destination
Exit A		South side of Pingshan Boulevard (W), Pingshan District Zhongshan Middle School
Exit B		South side of Pingshan Boulevard (E), Guoyuanbei Dingsheng Building, Niujiaolong Community
Exit C	C1	North side of Pingshan Boulevard (E)
Exit C	C2	North side of Pingshan Boulevard (E)
Exit D		North side of Pingshan Boulevard (W)
