= Baolong Pegasus =

Chinese MPV

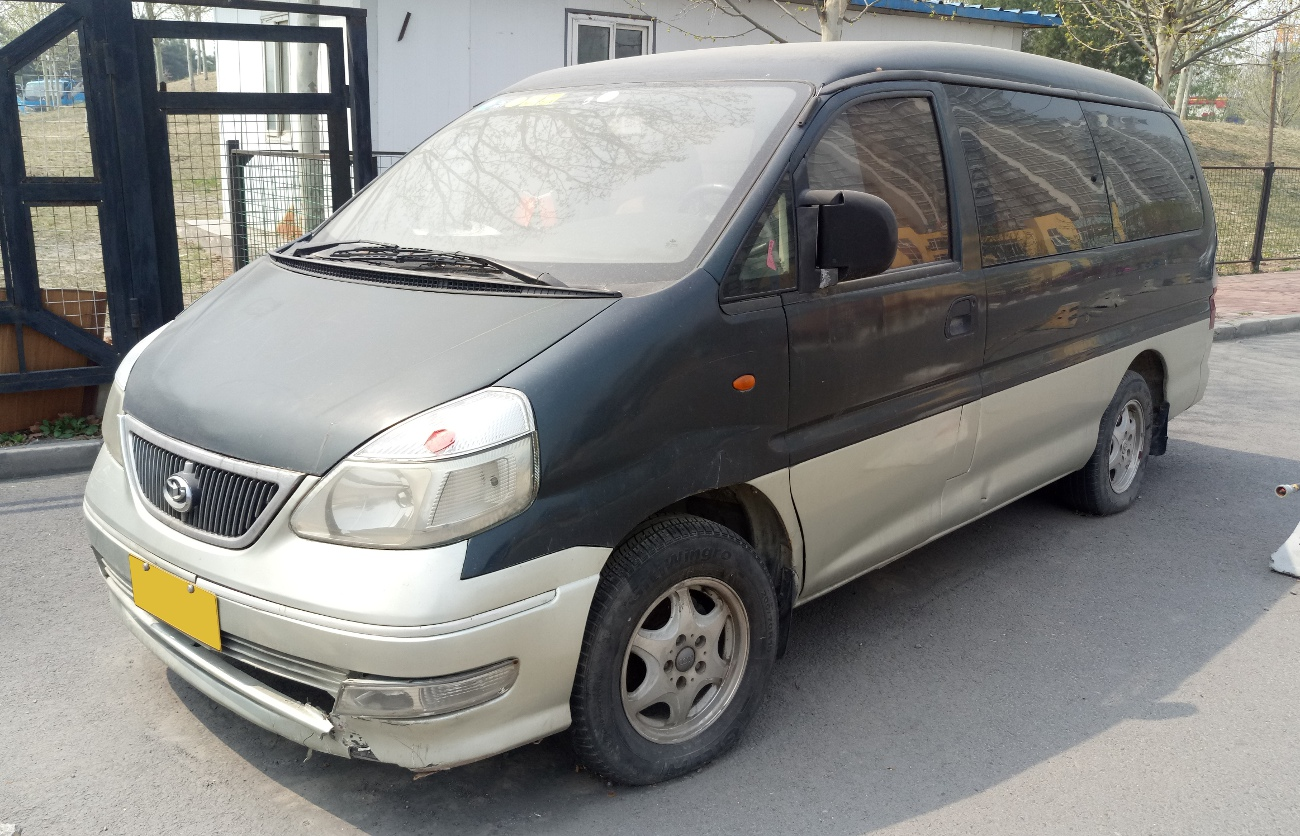

Overview
- Also called: FAW Freewind (Ziyoufeng); Baolong Lingqi (菱麒, high top variant)
- Production: 2001–2005
- Assembly: Guangzhou, China

Body and chassis
- Class: MPV (M)
- Body style: 5-door van
- Layout: Front engine, rear-wheel-drive layout Front engine, all-wheel-drive
- Related: Mitsubishi Space Gear; Hyundai Starex; Dongfeng Fengxing Lingzhi

Powertrain
- Engine: 2.4 L 4G64 I4 (gasoline); 3.0 L 6G72 V6 (gasoline)
- Transmission: 4-speed automatic 5-speed manual

Dimensions
- Wheelbase: 2,800 mm (110.2 in)
- Length: 4,595–5,085 mm (180.9–200.2 in)
- Width: 1,695 mm (66.7 in)
- Height: 1,950 mm (76.8 in)

The Baolong Pegasus (Tianmazuo, 天馬座) is an MPV designed and built by the now defunct Chinese automaker Guangzhou Baolong Motors from 2001 to 2005. It was originally based on a licensed production of the Mitsubishi Delica Space Gear vans. As of 2006, the Baolong Pegasus was rebranded as the FAW Freewind (Ziyoufeng, 自由风).

== Overview ==
Vans produced by Baolong were available from November 2001. The Baolong Tianmazuo, also known as the Baolong Pegasus, was a licensed production of the Mitsubishi Space Gear The TBL 6500H trim had room for seven people and had a four-cylinder engine with 2351 cc displacement and 97 kW. The same motorized TBL 6500 trim had eleven seats. In 2003, the seven-seater supplemented TBL 6508 H and the TBL 6508 is available with either eight or eleven seats. Both models were powered by a V6 engine with 2972cc displacement and 118 kW of torque. TBL 6500 H and TBL 6508 H hadt a wheelbase of 2800mm, a track width of 1445mm (front) and 1420mm (rear), a length of 4595mm, a width of 1695mm, and a height of 1950mm. The TBL 6508 had a 3000mm long wheelbase, 5080mm in length, 1820mm wide, and a height of 1960mm. All versions were revised in October 2003.

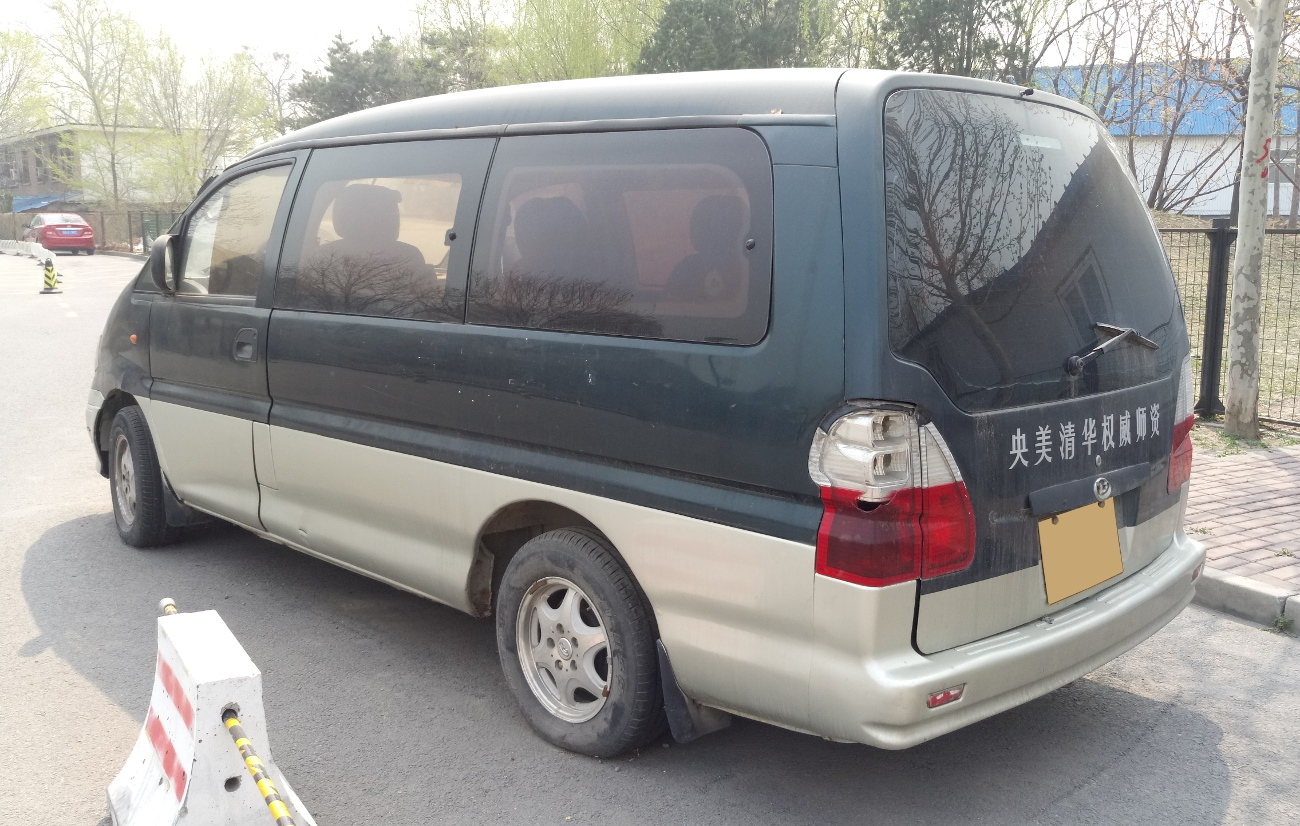
Baolong Pegasus rear

== FAW Freewind ==
In September 2005, FAW Hongta and FAW Baolong Light Vehicle joined forces to found the successor company FAW Baolong Light Vehicle, and the Baolong Pegasus was rebranded as the FAW Freewind (Ziyoufeng, 自由风) as of 2006.

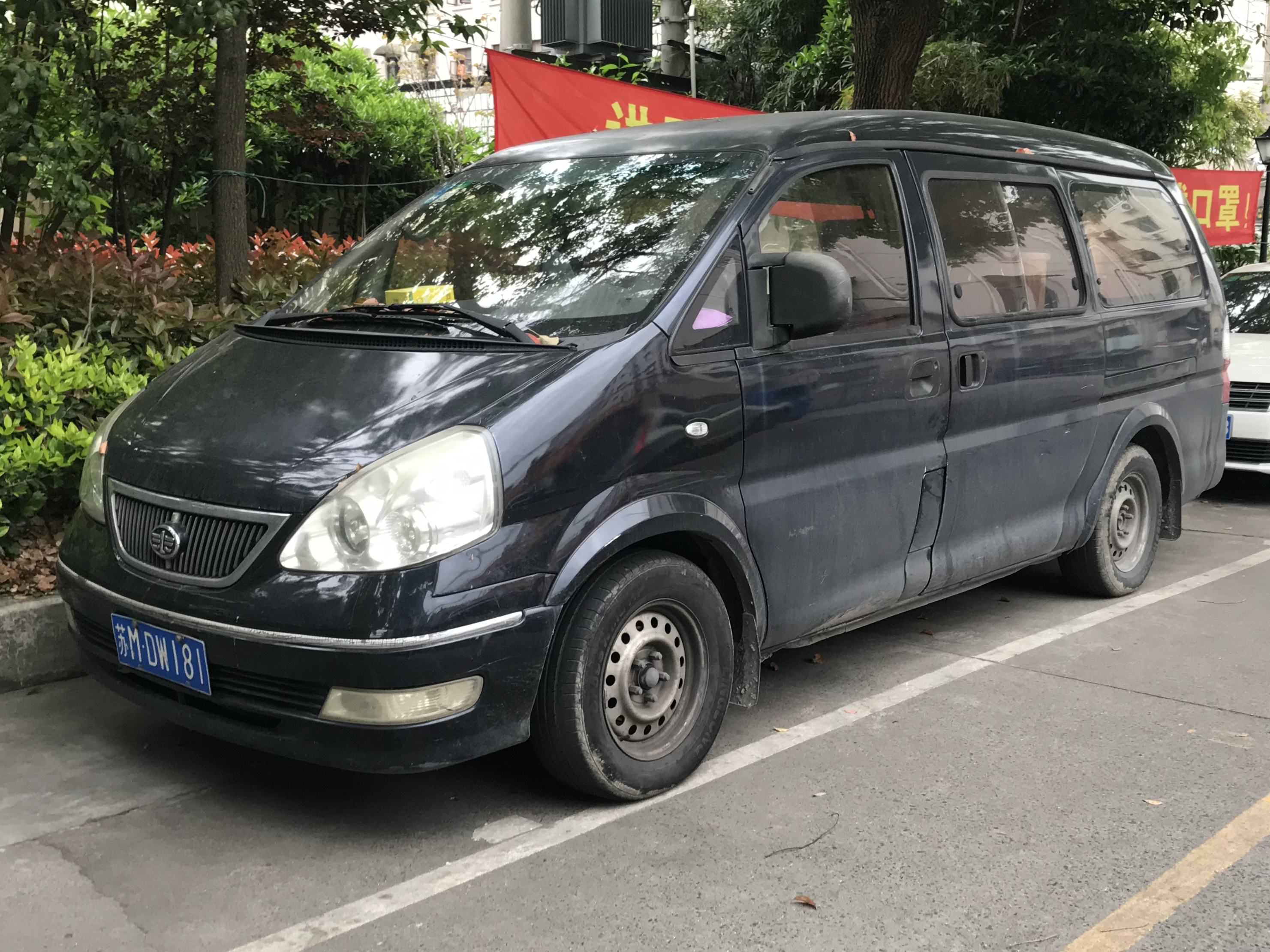
FAW Freewind front

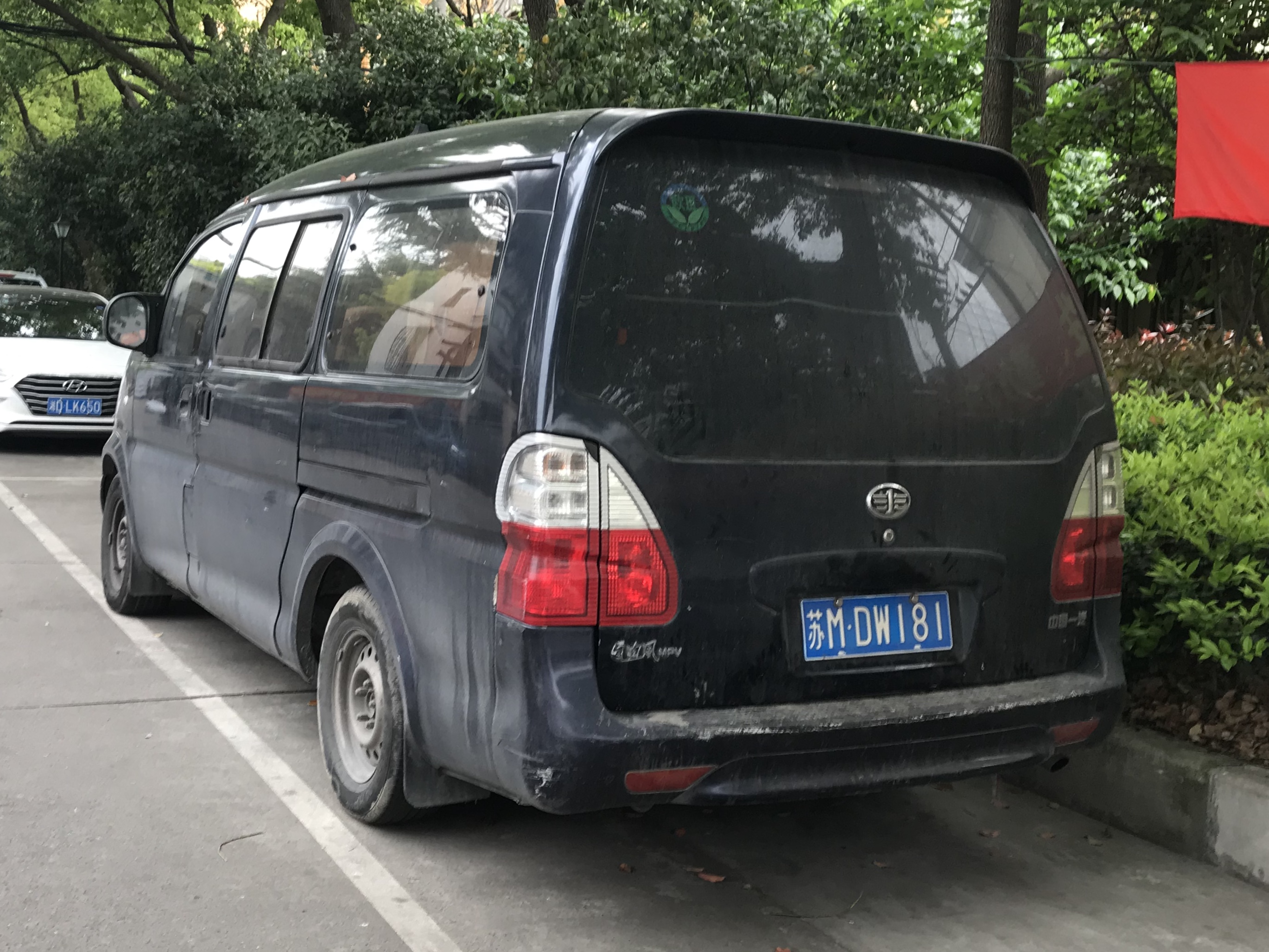
FAW Freewind rear

== Design ==
Due to the foundation being based on the Mitsubishi Space Gear, the side profile is exactly the same as the Mitsubishi Space Gear, with the entire front end redesigned to resemble the Nissan Serena (C24), and a redesigned rear that still keeps the same rear quarter panel from the Mitsubishi Space Gear.
