= Shiyaling station =

Metro station in Shenzhen, China

Shiyaling 石芽岭
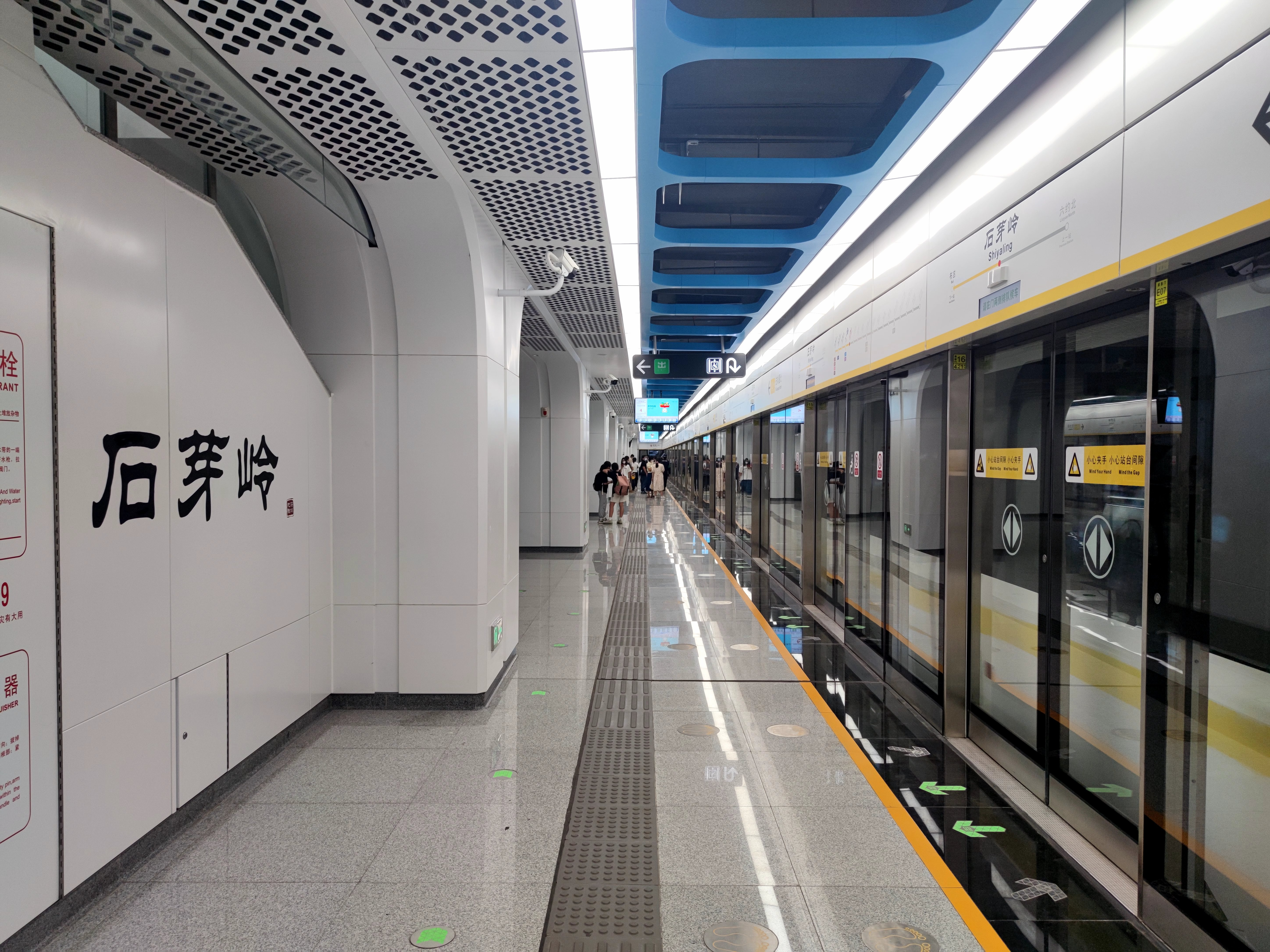
- Line 14 platform in October 2022

General information
- Location: Longgang District, Shenzhen, Guangdong; China
- Coordinates: 22.6311°N 114.1328°E
- Operated by: SZMC (Shenzhen Metro Group)
- Line: Line 14
- Platforms: 2 (1 island platform)
- Tracks: 2

Construction
- Structure type: Underground
- Accessible: Yes

History
- Opened: 28 October 2022

Services
Preceding station	Shenzhen Metro	Following station
Buji towards Gangxia North	Line 14	Liuyue North towards Shatian
Location

Shiyaling station (Chinese: 石芽岭站; pinyin: Shíyálǐng Zhàn) is a station on Line 14 of Shenzhen Metro in Shenzhen, Guangdong, China, which is opened on 28 October 2022. It is located at northeast of the intersection of Shengbao Road, Kejieyuan Road and Bulan Road.

It will become an interchange station for Line 14 and Line 17 in the future. Line 17 platforms is reserved during the construction of Line 14.

== Station layout ==
G	-	Exit
B1F; Concourse	Lobby	Customer Service, Shops, Vending machines, ATMs
B2F; Platforms	Platform	14 towards Gangxia North (Buji)
B2F; Platforms	Island platform, doors will open on the left
B2F; Platforms	Platform	14 towards Shatian (Liuyue North)

== Exits ==
Note: Some exits are reserved for Line 17 (Exit C - Exit G).

Exit		Destination
Exit A	A1	South side of Kejiyuan Rd
Exit A	A2	West side of Bulan Rd (S), Yuhong Health Flower City
Exit B		East side of Bulan Rd (S), Nanwan School
Exit H		North side of Shengbao Rd
Exit J		East side of Bulan Rd (N), Buji Squadron, Longgang brigade, Traffic Police Detachment, Shenzhen Public Security Bureau
Exit K		West side of Bulan Rd (N)
