= Liuyue North station =

Metro station in Shenzhen, China

Liuyue North 六约北
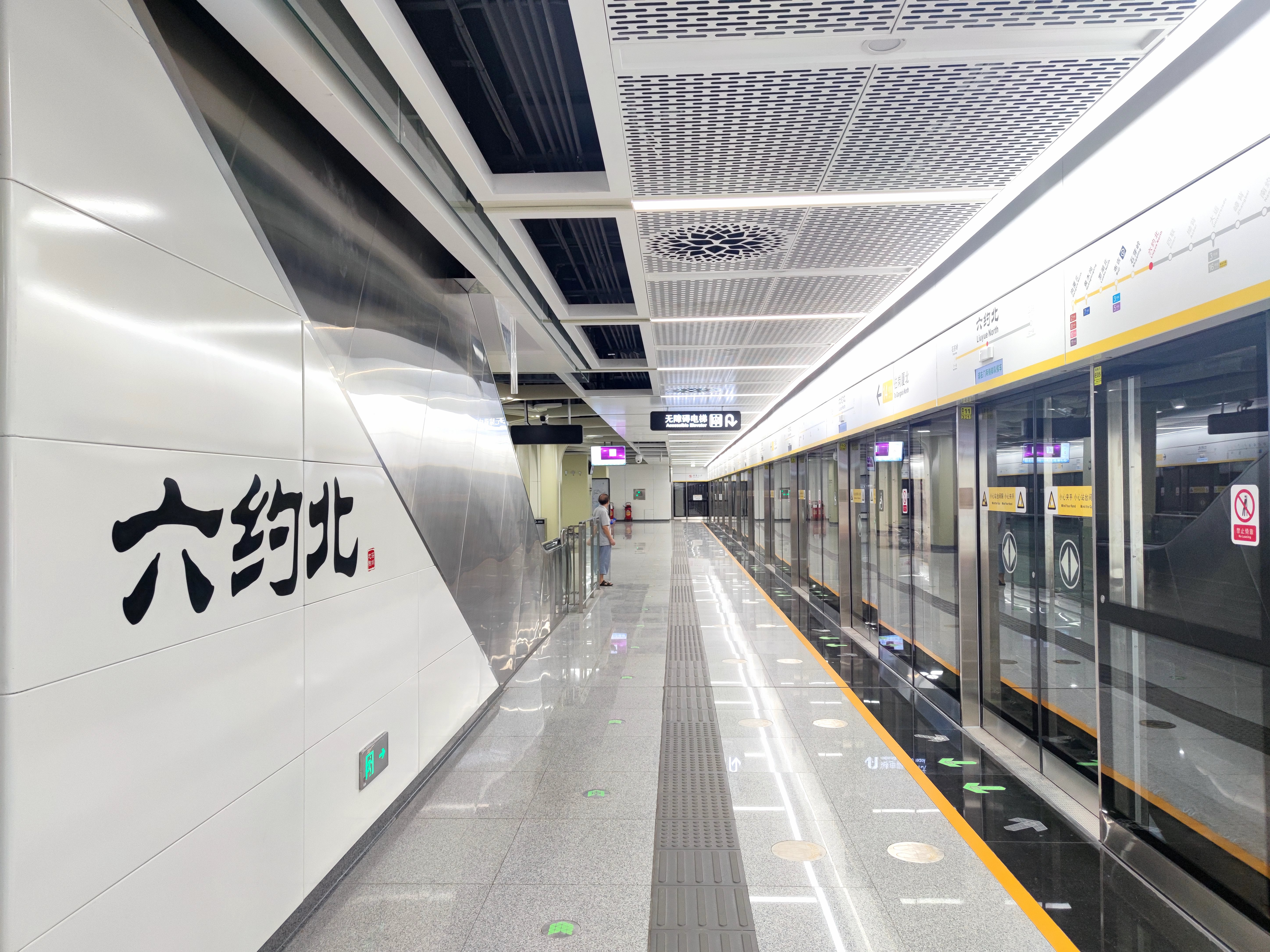
- Platform in October 2022

General information
- Location: Shenzhen, Guangdong; China
- Coordinates: 22.6453°N 114.1707°E
- Operated by: SZMC (Shenzhen Metro Group)
- Line: Line 14
- Platforms: 2 (1 island platform)
- Tracks: 2

Construction
- Structure type: Underground
- Accessible: Yes

History
- Opened: 28 October 2022

Services
Preceding station	Shenzhen Metro	Following station
Shiyaling towards Gangxia North	Line 14	Silian towards Shatian
Location

Liuyue North station (Chinese: 六约北站; pinyin: Liùyuē Běi Zhàn) is a station on Line 14 of Shenzhen Metro in Shenzhen, Guangdong, China, which opened on 28 October 2022. It is located in Longgang District.

== Station layout ==
G	-	Exit
B1F; Concourse	Lobby	Customer Service, Shops, Vending machines, ATMs
B2F; Platforms	Platform	14 towards Gangxia North (Shiyaling)
B2F; Platforms	Island platform, doors will open on the left
B2F; Platforms	Platform	14 towards Shatian (Silian)

== Exits ==
Exit	Destination
Exit A	South side of Hongmian Road (W), Henggang Street Veterans Service Station
Exit B	West side of Shenfeng Road
Exit C	South side of Hongmian Road (E), Henggang Street Central Kindergarten, Hongmian Community Park, Zhenye City
Exit D	East side of Shenfeng Road, Dashandi Kindergarten, Zhonghai Mountain
Exit E	North side of Hongmian Road, Liuyue New Village
