= Aobei station =

Metro station in Shenzhen, China

Coordinates: 22°41′10″N 114°13′42″E

Aobei 坳背
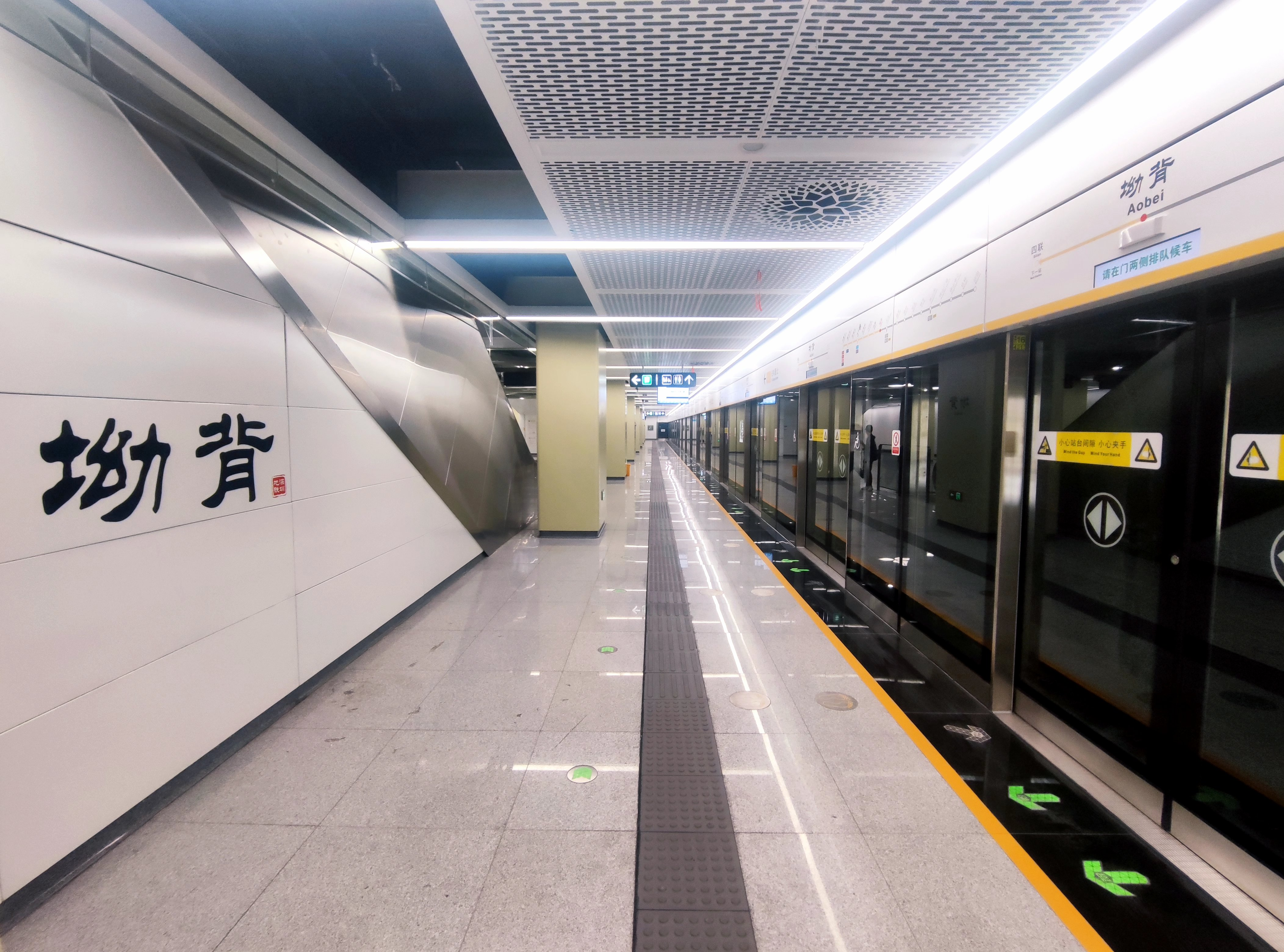
- Platform in October 2022

General information
- Location: Shenzhen, Guangdong; China
- Operated by: SZMC (Shenzhen Metro Group)
- Line: Line 14
- Platforms: 4 (2 island platforms)
- Tracks: 2

Construction
- Structure type: Underground
- Accessible: Yes

History
- Opened: 28 October 2022

Services
Preceding station	Shenzhen Metro	Following station
Silian towards Gangxia North	Line 14	Universiade towards Shatian
Location

Aobei station (Chinese: 坳背站; pinyin: Àobèi Zhàn) is a station on Line 14 of Shenzhen Metro in Shenzhen, Guangdong, China. It opened on 28 October 2022.

== Station layout ==
G	-	Exit
B1F; Concourse	Lobby	Customer Service, Shops, Vending machines, ATMs
B2F; Platforms	Platform	14 towards Gangxia North (Silian)
B2F; Platforms	Island platform, doors will open on the left
B2F; Platforms	Platform	21 reserved platform
B2F; Platforms	Platform	21 reserved platform
B2F; Platforms	Island platform, doors will open on the left
B2F; Platforms	Platform	14 towards Shatian (Universiade)

== Exits ==
Exit	Destination
Exit A	East side of Hongmian Rd
Exit B	North side of Aobei Rd, Aobei Market
Exit C	West side of Hongmian Rd, Ao'er Village
Exit D	South side of Aobei Rd, Aoyi Village, Aozhong Community
