= Silian station =

Metro station in Shenzhen, Guangdong, China

Silian 四联
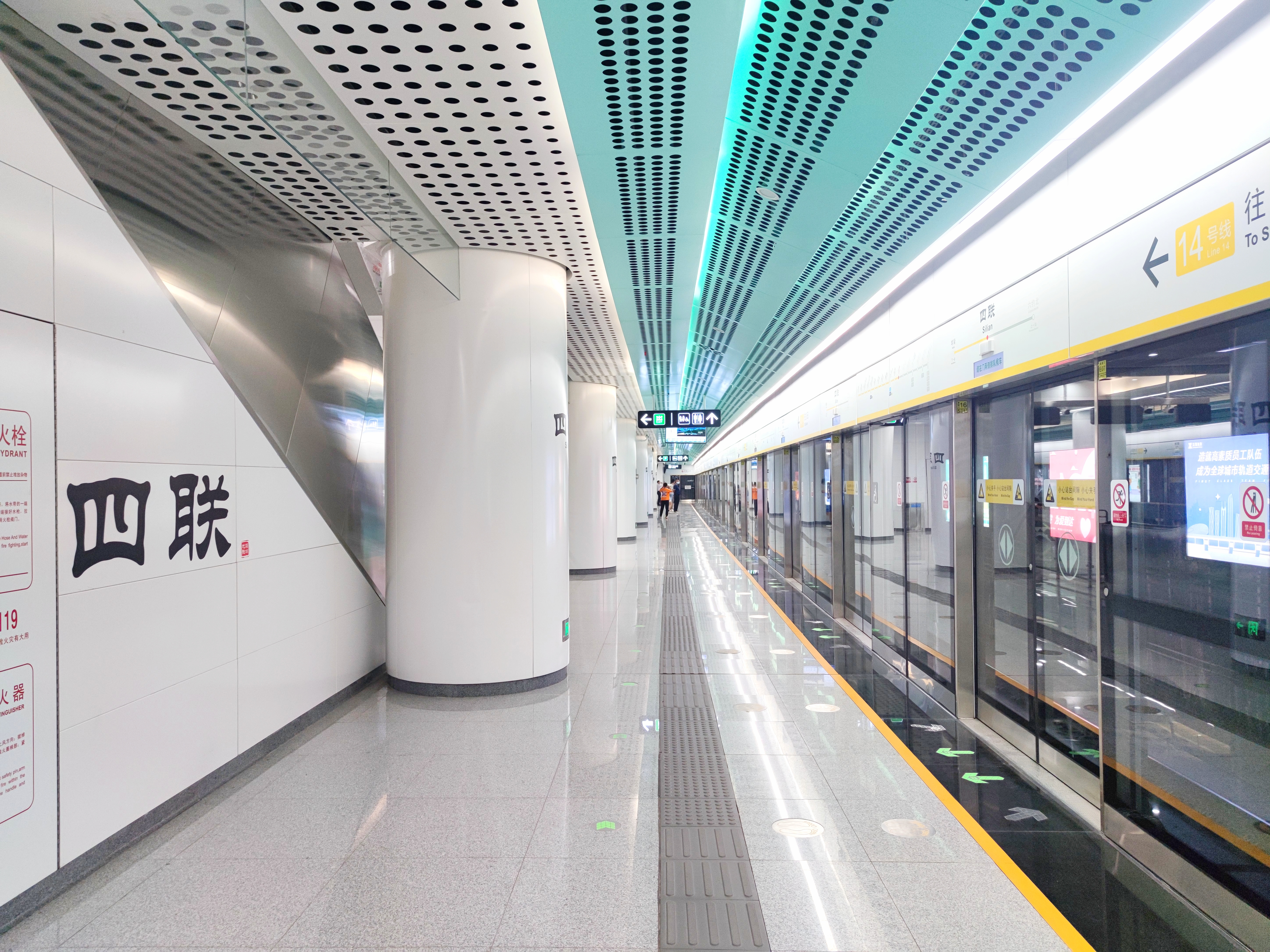
- Platform

General information
- Location: Longgang District, Shenzhen, Guangdong; China
- Coordinates: 22.6513°N 114.1880°E
- Operated by: SZMC (Shenzhen Metro Group)
- Line: Line 14
- Platforms: 2 (1 island platform)
- Tracks: 2

Construction
- Structure type: Underground
- Accessible: Yes

History
- Opened: 28 October 2022

Services
Preceding station	Shenzhen Metro	Following station
Liuyue North towards Gangxia North	Line 14	Aobei towards Shatian
Location

Silian station (Chinese: 四联站; pinyin: Sìlián Zhàn) is a station on Line 14 of Shenzhen Metro in Shenzhen, Guangdong, China, which is opened on 28 October 2022 It is located in Longgang District.

It will become an interchange station for Line 14 and Line 18 in the future. It reserved transfer passage for Line 18 at Line 14 platform.

== History ==
In March 2018, Shenzhen Metro Group Co., Ltd. released the Environmental Impact Report of Shenzhen Urban Rail Transit Line 14 Project, which includes this station.

On April 22, 2022, Shenzhen Municipal Bureau of Planning and Natural Resources issued the Announcement on the Approval Scheme of Shenzhen Rail Transit Phase IV Station Name Plan, in which the station will continue to use the name, Silian station.

On October 28, 2022, the station was opened together with Shenzhen Metro Line 14.

== Station layout ==
G	-	Exit
B1F; Minor concourse	Lobby	Exit E
B2F; Concourse	Lobby	Customer Service, Shops, Vending machines, ATMs
B3F; Platforms	Platform	14 towards Gangxia North (Liuyue North)
B3F; Platforms	Island platform, doors will open on the left
B3F; Platforms	Platform	14 towards Shatian (Aobei)

== Exits ==
Silian station has five exits, of which Exit A and B are equipped with elevators.

Exits	Picture of exit	Picture of elevator	Destination
			East side of Henggang 1st Rd, Xinyi Jinxiu Garden, Zhuoyue City Center Garden
Only vertical elevator	Not applicable		South side of Hongmian Rd (W), Kangle Wuqu
		Not applicable	South side of Hongmian Rd (E), Xianhe Community
		Not applicable	North side of Hongmian Rd, Henggang Sub-District Workers' New Village, Kangle Garden, Kangle Kindergarten, Yijin Community Party Masses Service (Office Hall)
		Not applicable	West Side of Hengxin Rd, Yijin Community Veterans Service Station

== Gallery ==
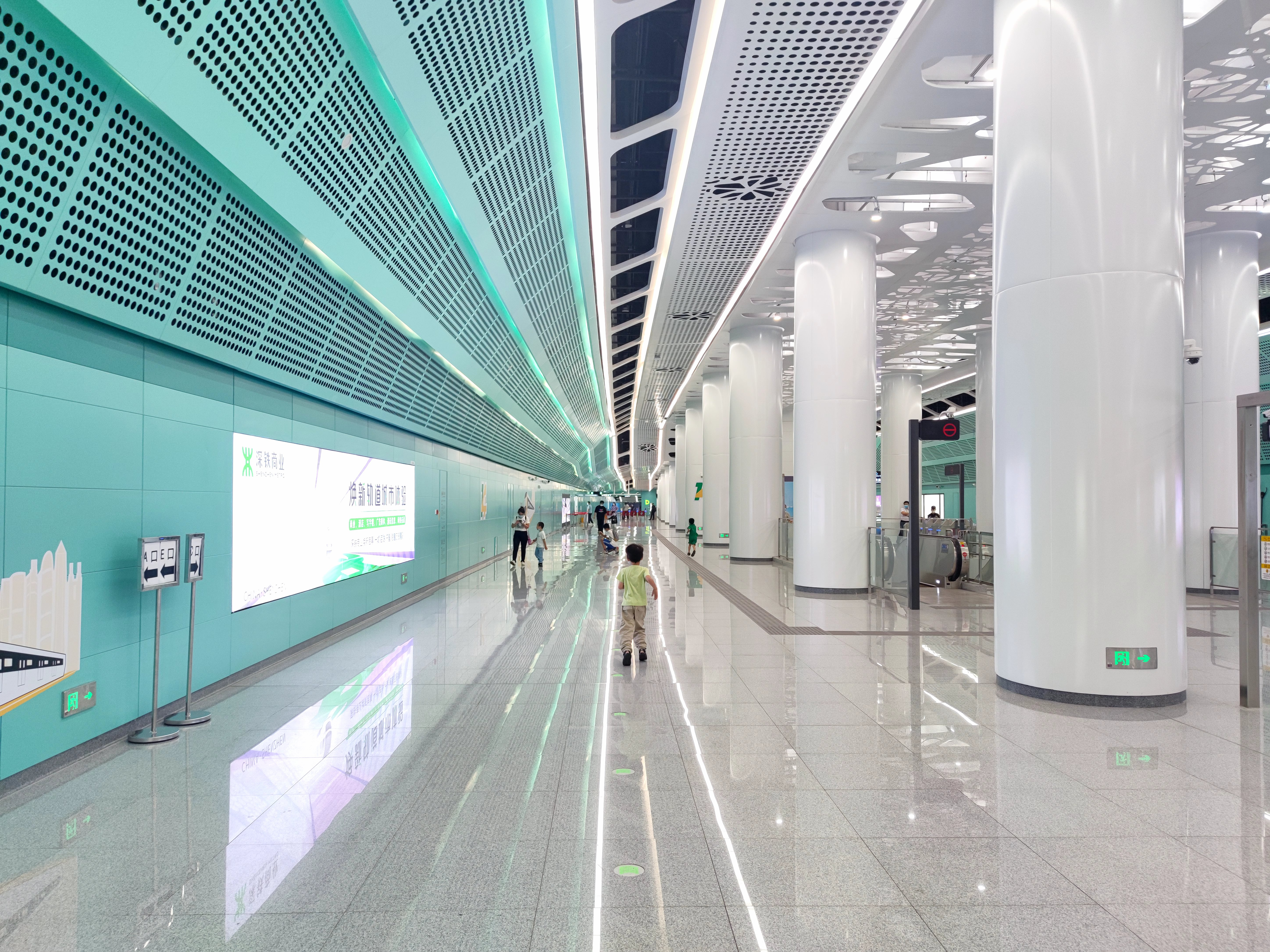
Concourse

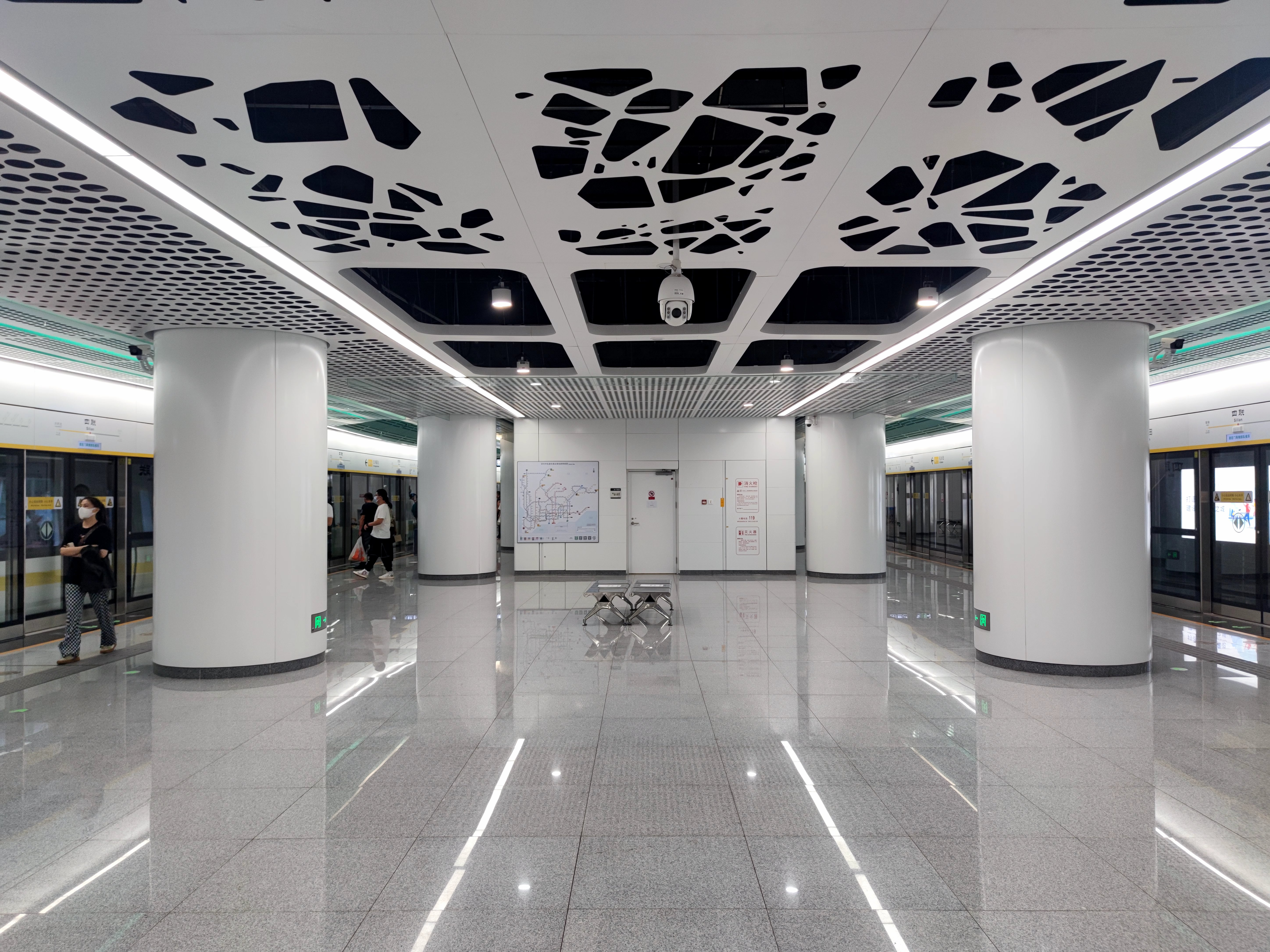
Platform

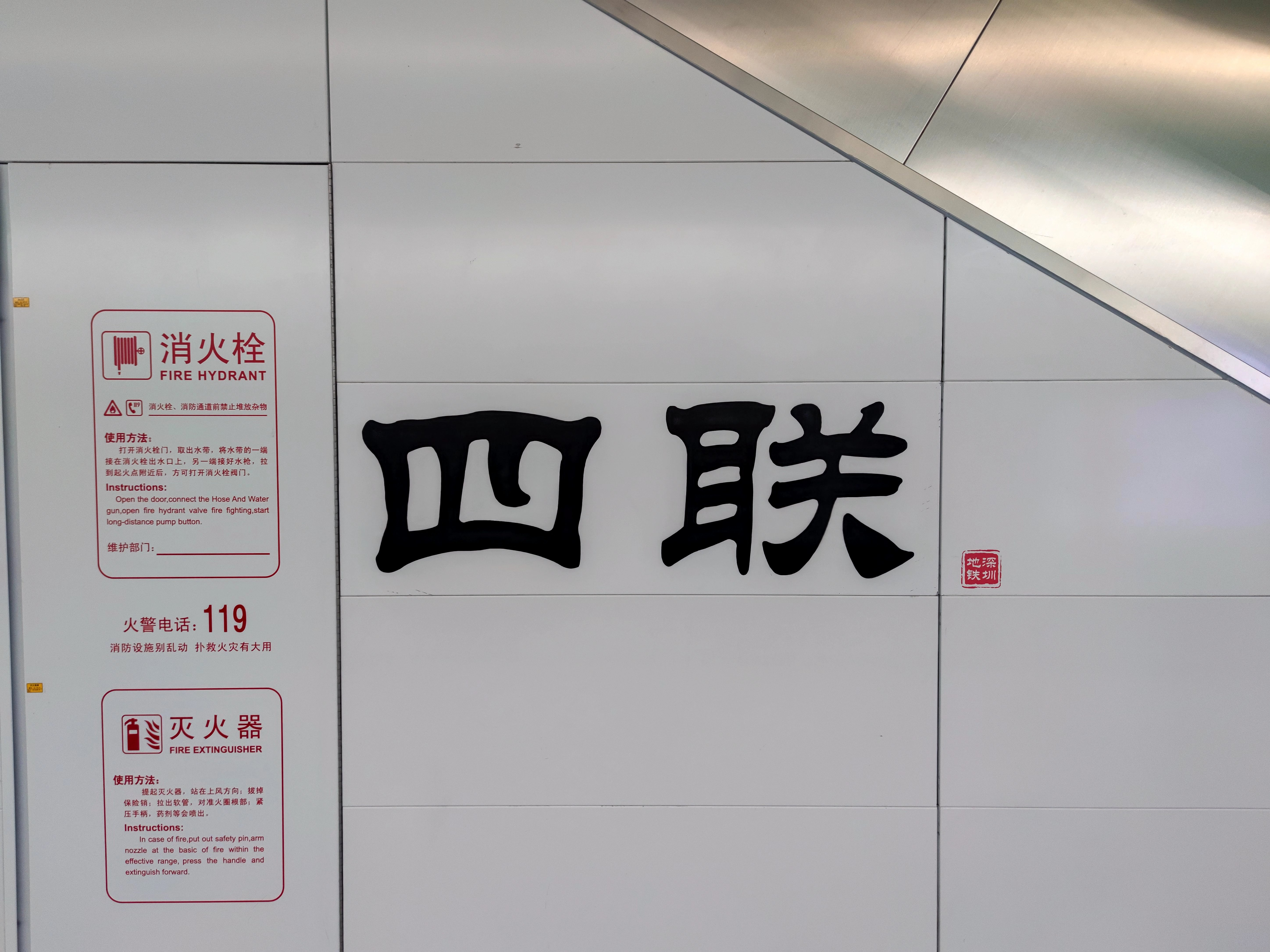
Platform calligraphy

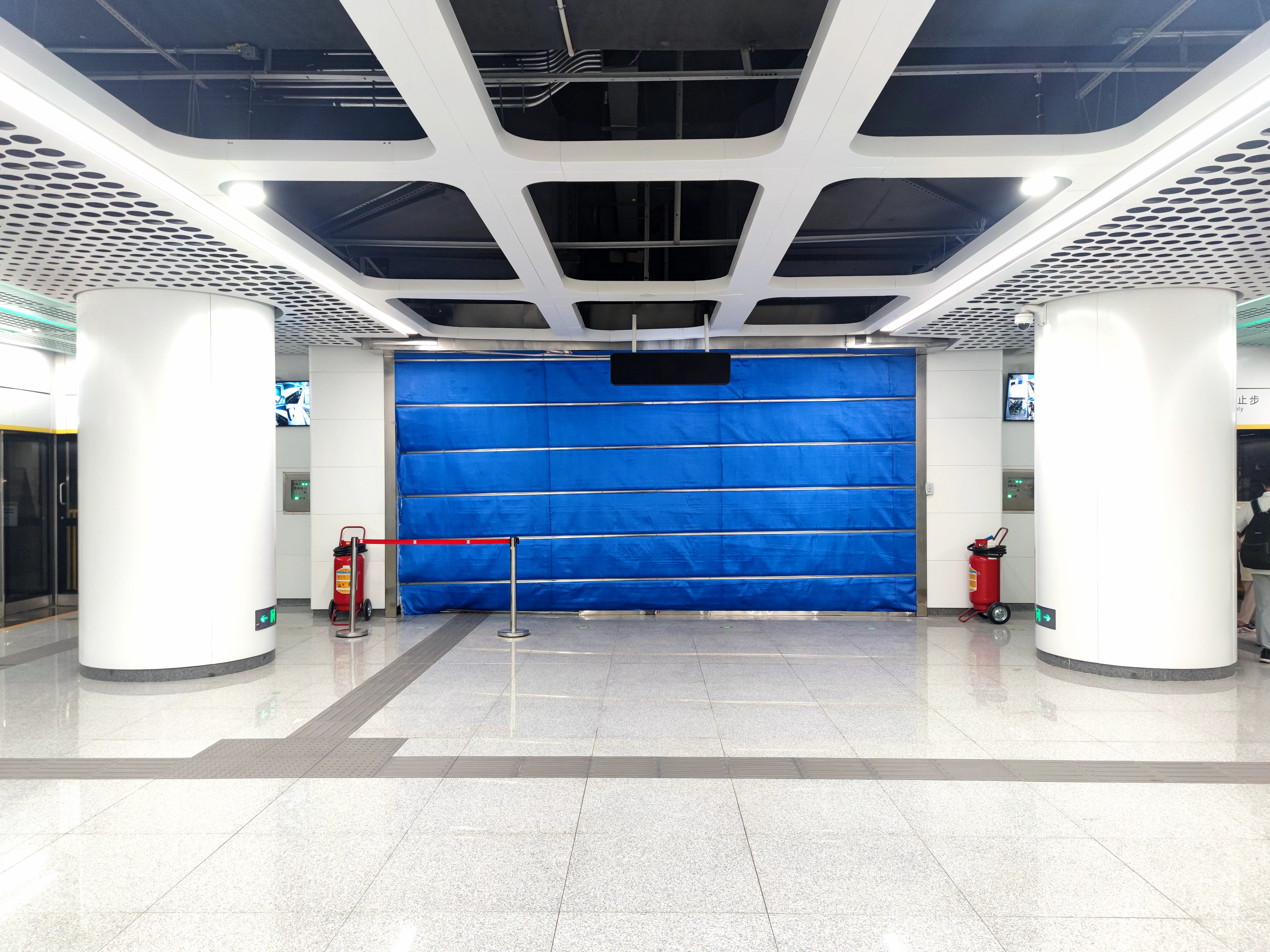
Reserved transfer passage for Line 18
