= 2012 local electoral calendar =

Worldwide local elections held in 2012

This local electoral calendar for 2012 lists the subnational elections held in 2012. Referendums, recall and retention elections, and national by-elections (special elections) are also included.

== January ==
- 4 January: India, Assam, Karbi Anglong, Autonomous Council
- 5 January: Bangladesh, Comilla, Mayor and City Corporation
- 28 January: India, Manipur, Legislative Assembly
- 30 January: India
  - Punjab, Legislative Assembly
  - Uttarakhand, Legislative Assembly
- 31 January: United States, Oregon's 1st congressional district, U.S. House of Representatives special election

== February ==
- 1 February: China, Wukan, Village Chief and Village Council (1st round)
- 4 February: Philippines, Zambales' 2nd district special election
- 5 February:
  - Ecuador, La Concordia, Join Which Province referendum
  - Switzerland, Basel-Stadt, referendums
- 7 February: India, Maharashtra, District Councils and Township Councils
- 8 February: India, Uttar Pradesh, Legislative Assembly (1st phase)
- 9 February: Australia, Lord Howe Island, Board
- 11 February: India
  - Odisha, District Councils, Township Councils and Village Councils (1st phase)
  - Uttar Pradesh, Legislative Assembly (2nd phase)
- 12 February: Germany, Duisburg, Lord Mayor recall election
- 13 February: India, Odisha, District Councils, Township Councils and Village Councils (2nd phase)
- 14–15 February: Kosovo, North Kosovo acceptance of Republic of Kosovo institutions
- 15 February: India
  - Odisha, District Councils, Township Councils and Village Councils (3rd phase)
  - Uttar Pradesh, Legislative Assembly (3rd phase)
- 16 February: India, Maharashtra, Municipal Corporations
- 17 February: India, Odisha, District Councils, Township Councils and Village Councils (4th phase)
- 19 February: India
  - Odisha, District Councils, Township Councils and Village Councils (5th phase)
  - Uttar Pradesh, Legislative Assembly (4th phase)
- 21 February: United States, Milwaukee, Mayor and Common Council (1st round)
- 23 February: India, Uttar Pradesh, Legislative Assembly (5th phase)
- 25 February: Pakistan, NA-9, NA-140, NA-148, NA-149, NA-168 and NA-195, National Assembly by-elections
- 28 February: India, Uttar Pradesh, Legislative Assembly (6th phase)

== March ==
- 3 March:
  - China, Wukan, Village Chief and Village Council (2nd round)
  - India
    - Goa, Legislative Assembly
    - Uttar Pradesh, Legislative Assembly (7th phase)
- 7 March: Belize, Municipalities
- 10 March: Malta, Local council elections (half of the local councils)
- 11 March:
  - El Salvador, Mayors
  - Germany, Frankfurt, Mayor (1st round)
  - Switzerland
    - Aargau, referendums
    - Appenzell Ausserrhoden, referendums
    - Basel-Landschaft, referendums
    - Fribourg, Council of States by-election
    - Geneva, referendums
    - Grisons, referendum
    - Lucerne, referendums
    - Obwalden, referendums
    - Schaffhausen, referendum
    - Schwyz, Executive Council and Cantonal Council
    - Solothurn, referendums
    - St. Gallen, Government (1st round) and Cantonal Council
    - Thurgau, Executive Council
    - Uri, Executive Council and Landrat
    - Vaud, Council of State (1st round) and Grand Council
    - Zug, referendums
    - Zürich, referendums
- 15 March: Bangladesh, Shariatpur-3, House of the Nation by-election
- 18 March: India, Udupi Chikmagalur, House of the People by-election
- 24 March: Queensland (Australia), Legislative Assembly
- 25 March:
  - Germany
    - Frankfurt, Mayor (2nd round)
    - Saarland, Parliament
  - Jamaica, Local elections
  - Andalusia (Spain), Parliament
  - Asturias (Spain), Parliament

== April ==
- 1 April:
  - Myanmar, Parliamentary by-elections
  - Switzerland, Vaud, Council of State (2nd round)
- 3 April:
  - Liberia, Sinoe-3, House of Representatives by-election
  - United States
    - Anchorage, Mayor
    - Milwaukee, Mayor and Common Council (2nd round)
- 9 April: Aceh (Indonesia), Gubernatorial and local elections
- 10 April: United States, Long Beach, City Council (1st round)
- 15 April: Switzerland
  - Thurgau, Grand Council
  - Uri, referendums
- 17 April: India, Delhi, Municipal Corporations
- 22 April: Germany, Thuringia, County Administrators, Lord Mayors and Mayors
- 23 April: Alberta (Canada), Legislature
- 29 April: Switzerland
  - Appenzell Innerrhoden, Landsgemeinde
  - St. Gallen, Government (2nd round)

== May ==
- 3 May:
  - India, Mizoram, Mara Autonomous District, Council
  - United Kingdom, Local (including Mayor of London and Scotland as well as London Assembly)
- 6 May:
  - Germany, Schleswig-Holstein, Parliament
  - Switzerland, Glarus, Landsgemeinde
- 6–7 May: Italy, Local (1st round)
- 12 May: United States
  - Arlington, City Council (1st round)
  - Austin, Mayor and City Council
- 13 May: Germany, North Rhine-Westphalia, Parliament
- 15 May: United States, Portland, Mayor and City Commission (1st round)
- 16 May: India, Goa, Village Councils
- 20–21 May: Italy, Local (2nd round)
- 26 May: Singapore, Hougang by-election

== June ==
- 2 June: Philippines, Negros Occidental's 5th district special election
- 5 June: United States
  - Bakersfield, Mayor
  - Fresno, Mayor and City Council (1st round)
  - Long Beach, City Council (2nd round)
  - Los Angeles County, Board of Supervisors
  - Riverside County, Board of Supervisors (1st round)
  - Sacramento, Mayor and City Council (1st round)
  - San Bernardino County, Board of Supervisors (1st round)
  - San Diego County, Board of Supervisors (1st round)
    - San Diego, Mayor, City Attorney, City Council (1st round) and Referendums
  - San Francisco, Referendums
  - Santa Clara County, Board of Supervisors
    - San Jose, City Council (1st round)
  - Wisconsin, Gubernatorial recall election
- 10 June:
  - India, Punjab, Municipal Corporations
  - Romania, Local
- 12 June:
  - India, Nellore, House of the People by-election
  - United States, Arizona's 8th congressional district, U.S. House of Representatives special election
- 17 June:
  - Germany, Duisburg, Lord Mayor by-election (1st round)
  - Switzerland
    - Aargau, referendums
    - Basel-Landschaft, referendums
    - Basel-Stadt, referendum
    - Geneva, referendums
    - Lucerne, referendums
    - Neuchâtel, referendums
    - Schwyz, referendums
    - Solothurn, referendum
    - St. Gallen, referendum
    - Thurgau, referendum
    - Vaud, referendum
    - Zürich, referendums
- 23 June: United States, Arlington, City Council (2nd round)
- 24 June: India
  - Kannauj, House of the People by-election
  - Uttar Pradesh, Municipal Corporations, Municipal Councils and Town Councils (1st phase)
- 27 June: India, Uttar Pradesh, Municipal Corporations, Municipal Councils and Town Councils (2nd phase)

== July ==
- 1 July:
  - Germany, Duisburg, Lord Mayor by-election (2nd round)
  - India, Uttar Pradesh, Municipal Corporations, Municipal Councils and Town Councils (3rd phase)
- 3 July: Liberia, Montserrado-11, House of Representatives by-election
- 4 July: India, Uttar Pradesh, Municipal Corporations, Municipal Councils and Town Councils (4th phase)
- 11 July: Jakarta (Indonesia), Gubernatorial (1st round)
- 29 July: India, West Bengal, Gorkhaland, Territorial Administration

== August ==
- 11 August: United States, Honolulu, Mayor and City Council (1st round)
- 14 August: United States
  - Miami-Dade County, Mayor and County Commission (1st round)
  - Orange County, CA, Board of Supervisors (1st round)
- 25 August: Northern Territory (Australia), Legislative Assembly
- 26 August:
  - Germany, Dortmund, City Council and Borough Councils
  - Switzerland, Schaffhausen, Executive Council

== September ==
- 4 September: Quebec (Canada), National Assembly
- 8 September:
  - Eastern (Sri Lanka), Provincial
  - North Central (Sri Lanka), Provincial
  - Sabaragamuwa (Sri Lanka), Provincial
- 13 September: India, Manipur, District Councils, Township Councils and Village Councils
- 20 September: Jakarta (Indonesia), Gubernatorial (2nd round)
- 23 September: Switzerland
  - Aargau, referendums
  - Basel-Landschaft, referendum
  - Bern, referendums
  - Grisons, referendum
  - Lucerne, referendum
  - Neuchâtel, referendum
  - Schaffhausen, Cantonal Council
  - Schwyz, referendums
  - Solothurn, referendum
  - St. Gallen, referendum
  - Thurgau, referendums
  - Ticino, referendums
  - Uri, referendums
  - Zürich, referendums
- 30 September: Bangladesh, Gazipur-4, House of the Nation by-election

== October ==
- 1 October: Georgia, Adjara, Supreme Council
- 7 October:
  - Austria, Burgenland, Mayors (1st round) and Municipal Councils
  - Brazil, Municipal elections
  - Germany, Stuttgart, Lord Mayor (1st round)
- 10 October: India, Jangipur and Tehri Garhwal, House of the People by-elections
- 12 October: Czech Republic, Regional elections
- 14 October:
  - Belgium, Provincial and municipal elections
  - Azores (Portugal), Legislative Assembly
- Switzerland, Geneva, referendum
- 20 October:
  - Australian Capital Territory (Australia), Legislative Assembly
  - Palestinian territories, Local, municipal and village councils
- 21 October:
  - Germany, Stuttgart, Lord Mayor (2nd round)
  - Basque Country (Spain), Parliament
  - Galicia (Spain), Parliament
  - Switzerland, Aargau, Executive Council and Grand Council
- 28 October:
  - Brazil, Mayor, runoff in 50 large municipalities
  - Chile, Municipal election
  - Finland, Municipal election
  - Elections in Sicily (Italy), Parliament
  - Switzerland, Basel-Stadt, Executive Council (1st round) and Grand Council

== November ==
- 3 November: India, Sikkim, District Councils and Village Councils
- 4 November:
  - Austria, Burgenland, Mayors (2nd round)
  - India, Himachal Pradesh, Legislative Assembly
  - Nicaragua, Municipal election
- 6 November:
  - Guam, Mayors and Vice-Mayors
  - Northern Mariana Islands, Municipal Councils and Boards of Education
  - United States, Quadrennial elections
    - Michigan's 11th congressional district, U.S. House of Representatives special election
    - New Jersey's 10th congressional district, U.S. House of Representatives special election
    - Washington, D.C., Council
    - Alabama
    - Alaska
    - Arizona
      - Maricopa County, Board of Supervisors and Sheriff
    - Arkansas
    - California
      - Bakersfield, City Council
      - Fresno, City Council (2nd round)
      - Oakland, City Council
      - Orange County, Board of Supervisors (2nd round)
      - Riverside County, Board of Supervisors (2nd round)
      - Sacramento, City Council (2nd round)
      - San Bernardino County, Board of Supervisors (2nd round)
      - San Diego County, Board of Supervisors (2nd round)
        - San Diego, Mayor and City Council (2nd round)
      - San Francisco, Board of Supervisors, Board of Education, Community College Board and Referendums
      - San Jose, City Council (2nd round)
    - Colorado
    - Connecticut
    - Delaware
    - Florida
      - Broward County, Commission
      - Miami-Dade County, County Commission (2nd round)
    - Georgia
    - Hawaii
      - Honolulu, Mayor and City Council (2nd round)
    - Idaho
    - Illinois
      - Cook County, Board of Review, Clerk of the Circuit Court, Recorder of Deeds, State's Attorney and Water Reclamation District Board
    - Indiana
    - Iowa
    - Kansas
    - Kentucky
      - Louisville, Metropolitan Council
    - Louisiana
    - Maine
      - same-sex marriage referendum
    - Maryland
      - same-sex marriage referendum
    - Massachusetts
    - Michigan
      - Wayne County, Commission
    - Minnesota
      - same-sex marriage referendum
    - Mississippi
    - Montana
    - Nebraska
    - Nevada
      - Clark County, County Commission
    - New Hampshire
    - New Jersey
    - New Mexico
    - New York
    - North Carolina
    - North Dakota
    - Ohio
    - Oklahoma
    - Oregon
      - Portland, Mayor and City Commission (2nd round)
    - Pennsylvania
    - Rhode Island
    - South Carolina
    - South Dakota
    - Tennessee
    - Texas
      - Bexar County, Commissioners Court
      - Dallas County, Commissioners Court
      - Harris County, Commissioners Court
      - Tarrant County, Commissioners Court
    - Utah
    - Vermont
    - Virginia
      - Virginia Beach, Mayor and City Council
    - Washington
      - same-sex marriage referendum
    - West Virginia
    - Wisconsin
    - Wyoming
- 15 November: England and Wales (United Kingdom), Police and Crime Commissioners
- 18 November: Bangladesh, Tangail-3, House of the Nation by-election
- 24 November: Nigeria, Adamawa, Local Government Councils and Chairmen
- 25 November:
  - Austria, Graz, City Council, City Senate, District Councils and Migrant Advisory Board
  - Catalonia (Spain), Parliament
  - Switzerland
    - Appenzell Ausserrhoden, referendum
    - Basel-Landschaft, referendums
    - Basel-Stadt, Executive Council (2nd round)
    - Fribourg, referendum
    - Geneva, referendum
    - Grisons, referendum
    - Lucerne, referendum
    - Neuchâtel, referendum
    - Schaffhausen, referendums
    - St. Gallen, referendum
    - Vaud, referendum
    - Zürich, referendums

== December ==
- 1 December: Syria, Parliamentary by-elections
- 2 December:
  - Burkina Faso, municipal
  - Mauritius, Village Councils
- 4 December: Israel, Regional Heads and Regional Councils (1st phase)
- 8 December: United States, Louisiana's 3rd congressional district, U.S. House of Representatives (2nd round)
- 9 December: Mauritius, Municipal Councils
- 13 December: India, Gujarat, Legislative Assembly (1st phase)
- 16 December: Venezuela, Regional
- 17 December: India, Gujarat, Legislative Assembly (2nd phase)
- 20 December: Bangladesh, Comilla, Mayor and City Corporation
