= Hadži Milorad Stošić =

Serbian politician

Hadži Milorad Stošić (Serbian Cyrillic: Хаџи Милорад Стошић; born 11 August 1954) is a politician and retired military official in Serbia. He has served in the National Assembly of Serbia since 2012 as a member of the Party of United Pensioners of Serbia (PUPS).

== Early life and military career ==
Stošić was born in Dragovac, a village in the municipality of Priština, in what was then the Autonomous Region of Kosovo and Metohija in the People's Republic of Serbia, Federal People's Republic of Yugoslavia. He was raised in the Priština area, attended secondary military school in Belgrade, and graduated from the Belgrade Military Academy specializing in telecommunications.

Stošić served in the Yugoslav People's Army and the successor Armed Forces of Yugoslavia and Armed Forces of Serbia and Montenegro. He was a commander of units and oversaw telecommunications, personnel management, and operational-teaching tasks. He retired on 1 January 2004 with the rank of captain first class and was subsequently appointed as Information Systems Manager at the University of Niš Faculty of Mechanical Engineering. He now lives in Niš.

== Political career ==
Stošić joined the PUPS on its founding in 2005. He is the president of the party's municipal organization in Niš and has served as vice-president on its executive committee.

The PUPS contested the 2007 Serbian parliamentary election in an alliance with the Social Democratic Party, and Stošić received the tenth position on their electoral list. The list did not cross the electoral threshold to win representation in the assembly. The United Pensioners subsequently joined an electoral alliance led by the Socialist Party of Serbia in 2008 and continued in the alliance until 2016.

=== Municipal politics ===
From 2008 to 2012, Stošić was a member of the Niš city council (i.e., the executive branch of the city government). He subsequently appeared in the fifty-ninth position (out of sixty-one) on the Socialist Party's coalition list for the Niš city assembly in the 2012 local elections. Winning election from this position was a mathematical impossibility, and indeed he was not elected when the list won ten seats. His low position on the list was presumably due to his candidacy for the national assembly in the concurrent parliamentary elections. In July 2012, he represented the PUPS in discussions that led to a new coalition government in the city.

=== Parliamentarian ===
Stošić received the thirty-fourth position on the Socialist list in the 2012 parliamentary election and was elected when the list won forty-four mandates. Both the Socialists and the PUPS participated in a coalition government after the election, and Stošić served in the assembly as a government supporter. He received the forty-second position on the Socialist list in the 2014 election and was re-elected when the list again won forty-four mandates. The PUPS was not part of Serbia's coalition government in the parliament that followed, but the party continued to provide support for the government in the assembly.

For the 2016 Serbian parliamentary election, the United Pensioners joined the Aleksandar Vučić – Serbia Is Winning electoral alliance led by the Serbian Progressive Party. Stošić received the 113th position on the list and was elected to a third term when the list won a landslide victory with 131 out of 250 mandates. The PUPS rejoined Serbia's government after the election. During the 2016–20 parliament, Stošić was a member of the culture and information committee and the European integration committee; a deputy member of the committee on Kosovo-Metohija and the committee on labour, social issues, social inclusion, and poverty reduction; and a member of the parliamentary friendship groups with Argentina, Armenia, Australia, Belarus, Brazil, Bulgaria, China, Croatia, Cuba, Denmark, France, Italy, Kenya, Montenegro, North Macedonia, Norway, Russia, Slovenia, South Korea, Spain, Switzerland, Turkey, Ukraine, the United Kingdom, and the United States of America.

Stošić received the eighty-seventh position on the Progressive Party's list in the 2020 Serbian parliamentary election and was elected to a fourth term when the list won a landslide majority with 188 mandates. He is now a member of the committee on the diaspora and Serb in the region and the committee on labour, social issues, social inclusion, and poverty reduction; a deputy member of the committee on the judiciary, public administration, and local self-government; a deputy member of the agriculture, forestry, and water management committee; a deputy member of the committee on the rights of the child; a member of the European Union–Serbia stabilization and association committee; the leader of Serbia's parliamentary friendship groups with the Bahamas, Nicaragua, and Sudan; and a member of the friendship groups with Angola, Argentina, Armenia, Belarus, Bhutan, Brazil, Bulgaria, Cambodia, Chile, China, Croatia, Cuba, Denmark, Egypt, France, Germany, Greece, Guatemala, Guyana, Italy, Kazakhstan, Kuwait, Montenegro, Namibia, North Macedonia, Norway, Portugal, Russia, South Korea, Spain, Sweden, Switzerland, Tajikistan, Turkey, Turkmenistan, Ukraine, the United Kingdom, the United States of America, and Zimbabwe.
