= Stability maintenance =

Chinese Communist Party political slogan

Stability maintenance (Chinese: 维稳; pinyin: Wéiwěn) is a term used by the Chinese Communist Party (CCP) to refer to all-round surveillance and control by the CCP to support its ruling order and prevent protest and dissent that may challenge its legitimacy or rule in the People's Republic of China.

== History ==
The term weiwen was first used in People's Daily, the official newspaper of the Central Committee of the Chinese Communist Party, in 2002 in the explanation accompanying a photograph of the People's Armed Police. It was driven by the CCP's reaction to the Revolutions of 1989 and the increase in "mass incidents" in the 1990s. Following the 1989 Tiananmen Square protests and massacre, Deng Xiaoping famously stated, "stability overrides everything." During the run-up to the 2008 Beijing Olympics, the Chinese state began to emphasize stability maintenance, and the term reached new heights of popularity in Chinese media. Stability maintenance is used by the CCP as a performance indicator for officials.

Under the general secretaryship of Xi Jinping, stability maintenance became a key rationale for the state's mass surveillance system. In the 2020s, large language models, such as those produced by DeepSeek, have increased in usage for the CCP's stated goal of stability maintenance and "public opinion guidance."

== Definition ==
According to the definition of the People's Daily, the fundamental purpose of stability maintenance is to safeguard the fundamental interests of the masses. When law enforcement officers maintain public order, they must first ensure that they have good order; when they defend social justice, they must first demonstrate that they can handle matters fairly; when they crack down on illegal activities, they must first strictly abide by the law. Only by maintaining stability in this way can the rights and interests of the masses be safeguarded to the greatest extent possible.

== See also ==
- Ideology of the Chinese Communist Party
- Grid-style social management in China
