= Beiyang, Lufeng, Guangdong =

Beiyang 陂洋镇
- Subdistrict

Chinese transcription(s)
- Interactive map of Beiyang
- Coordinates: 23°01′52″N 115°50′28″E
- Country: China
- Province: Guangdong
- Prefecture: Shanwei
- County-level city: Lufeng
- Time zone: UTC+8 (China Standard Time)

Beiyang (Chinese: 陂洋; pinyin: Bēiyáng) is a township-level division situated in Lufeng, Shanwei, Guangdong, China.

== See also ==
- List of township-level divisions of Guangdong
