= Boshe =

Boshe 博社村
- Village
- Location in Guangdong Boshe (Guangdong)
- Coordinates: 22.86232°N 116.02432°E
- Country: China
- Province: Guangdong
- Prefecture-level city: Shanwei
- County-level city: Lufeng
- Town: Jiaxi (甲西镇)

Population
  - Estimate (January 2014): 14,000

Boshe (Chinese: 博社村; pinyin: Bóshè Cūn) is a village in Jiaxi, Lufeng, Shanwei, Guangdong province of China. The village has been in existence from at least the 13th century. As of January 2014, Boshe's population totaled about 14,000.

The village has attracted international attention for being a long time centre for meth and ketamine production, and has been called "China’s number one drug village" and "the Breaking Bad village" by the international press, and was nicknamed "The Fortress" by locals. Chinese authorities successfully raided it in December 2013, but drug production in the village has continued.

== Drug production ==
For years, Chinese police attempted to raid the village, but were unsuccessful. Sometimes, villagers were notified of their arrival, and hid drug production equipment. Other times, villagers would link arms to block roads into the village, encircle police officers with motorcycles, or even threaten them with AK-47s and grenades, which would sometimes simply be replicas.

Eventually, elite Chinese paramilitary police began preparing an operation to infiltrate the village with informants, and eventually raid the village. Preparations lasted a total of six years, and involved replacing certain informants sent to the village, out of fears that they began collaborating with local drug producers.

At approximately 4 AM on December 29, 2013, Chinese police raided 77 production sites in Boshe and arrested 182 people, including local Communist Party head Cai Dongjia, who was accused to leading drug production in the village. The operation involved 3,000 Chinese police officers, some of which arrived via helicopters and speedboats. Chinese police also jammed phone signals to ensure that no one could alert drug producers in Boshe as to the police's presence. Many of the houses in the town were found to have stacks of cash, gold bars, and illegal firearms. A makeshift explosives factory was also uncovered. In the weeks that followed, Chinese authorities continued searching houses in the village, and tracked down numerous individuals believed to be involved with drug production. One villager in Boshe quoted by the South China Morning Post alleged that about 40% of the village's 14,000 people were directly involved with drug production, and that many who weren't were still involved in drug trafficking. The BBC echoed a similar claim, noting that some villagers believed that "up to half of the village was involved in making chemical drugs".

As a consequence of the immense drug production in the village, villagers and waste collection officials note that the soil and water near the village were highly polluted, and that rampant chemical dumping was commonplace in the village.

The village drew international attention again in October 2015, when a former secondary school chemistry teacher was arrested for producing drugs in his own basement, drawing comparisons to the character Walter White from the American television show Breaking Bad, who did the same.

According to Xinhua News Agency the region is "plagued with rampant drug production and trafficking", that "over a third of meth consumed in China originates from Boshe and neighbouring villages", and that "one in five families is directly involved in drug production".

== In popular culture ==
The 2013 raid of Boshe has become the storyline of the 2019 Chinese series The Thunder.
