= Mass incidents in China =

Government term for large-scale protests

Mass incidents
- Part of protest and dissent in China
- Location: China
- Caused by: Layoff of workers; Abuse of workers; Income inequality; Development projects; Seizure of land; Environmental degradation
- Methods: Protesting; Sit-ins; Walk-outs; Violence; Vandalism; Riots

Mass incidents
- Traditional Chinese: 群體性事件
- Simplified Chinese: 群体性事件
Transcriptions
Standard Mandarin
- Hanyu Pinyin: qúntǐ xìng shìjiàn
Yue: Cantonese
- Jyutping: kwan^{4} tai^{2} sing^{3} si^{6} gin^{6-2}

Large-scale protests and incidents of civil disobedience in the People's Republic of China are described by its government as "mass incidents" (Chinese: 群体性事件).

The Chinese government broadly defines mass incidents as "planned or impromptu gathering[s] that form because of internal contradictions", and may include public speeches or demonstrations, physical clashes, public airings of grievances, and other group behaviors that are seen as disrupting social stability. Through contemporary analysis of such events four key aspects of mass incidents have been identified "diversified participants, highly organized actions, easily escalated conflicts and thornier disputes to settle". Mass incidents have occurred in China because of the treatment of workers within state-owned enterprises (SOEs) and special economic zones (SEZs), the widening of income disparities, and issues associated with development projects, namely forced land acquisition and environmental degradation.

Within the past few decades, the number of mass incidents occurring in China has seen significant growth, indicated by The Annual Report of China's Rules (2009). In more recent times the numbers have continued to be high yet are less documented making reliable statistics rare, however it is definite that the frequency of mass incidents has increased.

== Characteristics ==
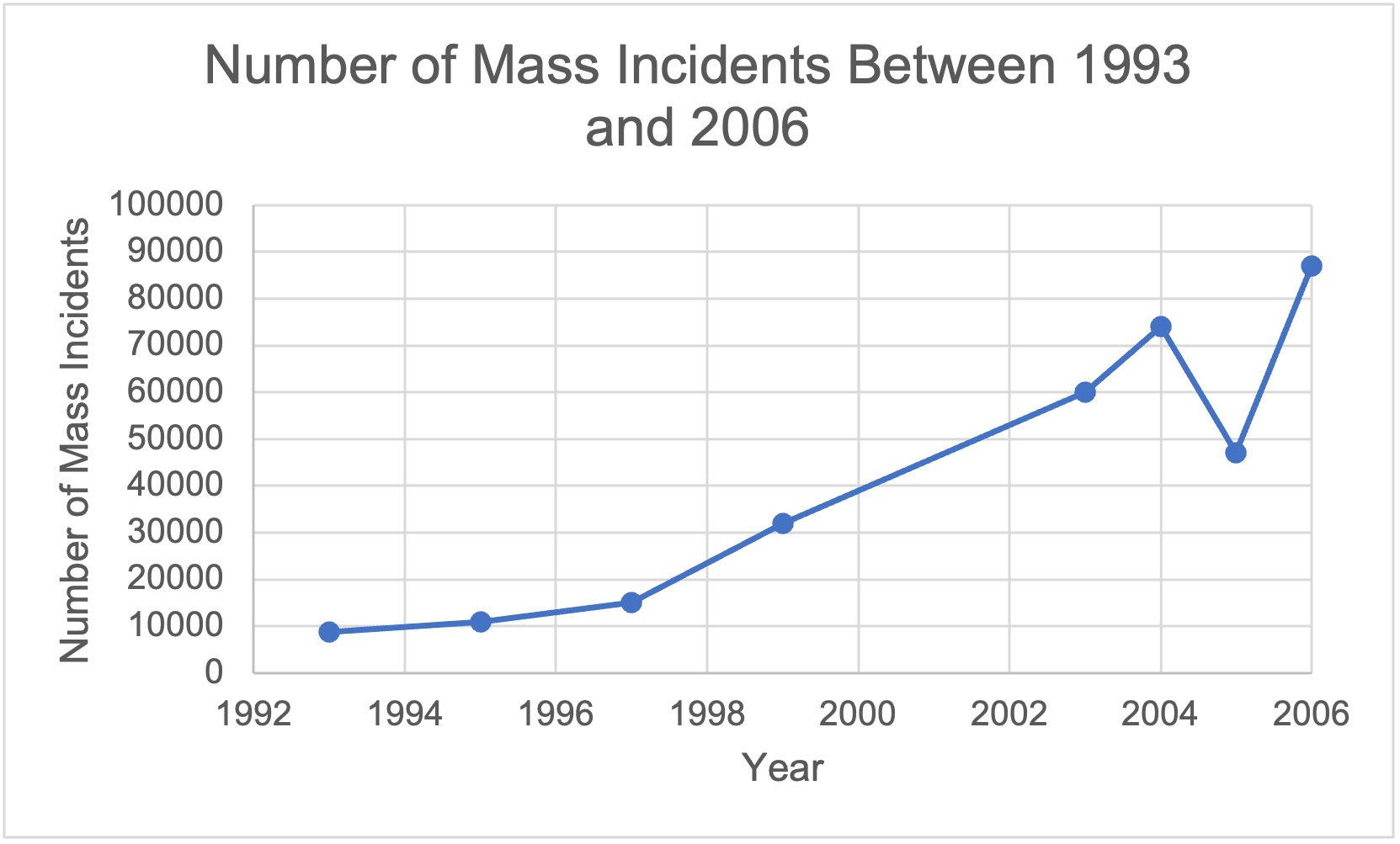
Graph depicts the number of mass incidents that occurred in China from 1993 to 2006.

Mass incidents in China have been commonplace since the country's step towards socioeconomic transformation in the late 1970s, with incidents, described by Jiuchang Wei, as following this push for change like an "inseparable shadow".

Mass incidents are characterized as any form of public disturbance. This includes any type of protesting, demonstrating, picketing as well as group petitioning. Those who are common participants in mass incidents include peasants, urban residents as well as workers within state-owned enterprises (SOEs) and special economic zones (SEZs). Numbers of those involved can range from tens to thousands. The behaviors associated with mass incidents differ, some are peaceful, involving petitions, appeal to authorities for aid as well as collective walks and sit ins.

Typically, there is a pattern to the collective behavior of mass incidents, with those occurring in rural areas to be of the more extreme nature than those in urban settings. This is because of less government involvement in country areas, meaning incidents have to reach severe levels for any intervention to occur. Despite this, city outbreaks of mass incidents are regarded as more serious, owing to the extreme effect they have on the government's image. Therefore, these areas are more controlled, in an attempt to prevent extreme behavior from occurring.

== Causes ==
The 2000s saw the height of social unrest within China, marked by the outbreak of numerous mass incidents. This was because of immense economic, social and political issues which arose from much development within China. Each of these issues have caused misgoverning within policies surrounding the treatment of China's citizens, within areas of labor, development projects and legal systems.

=== Layoffs and abuse of workers ===
State-owned enterprises were the main source of urban employment in China during the early 1990s. Therefore, the disbandment, restructuring and privatization of these institutions in 2000 led to millions of workers losing their source of income. Between 1999 and 2004 it was estimated that 27.8 million factory workers lost their jobs, resulting in masses of disgruntled workers and triggering urban mass incidents. These high rates of unemployment were met with the privatization of SOEs in which governments aimed to profit at the expense of their workers, leading to some of the largest mass incidents concerning labor occurring in March 2002. Including protests staged in front of city offices of 30,000 workers from 20 different factories in Liaoyang who complained of unpaid wages, corruption and the arrests of labor activists.

The experiences of the SOE workers were mirrored within the special economic zones (SEZs). However, workers within SEZs possessed very limited understanding of labor rights because the workforce mainly consisted of uneducated female migrants from poor rural areas. This meant the workers were less likely to revolt despite suffering appalling conditions. A set of data from 1992 of the Guangdong province reported on the high death rate of workers and the presence of over 500,000 child laborers and 2003 data stated that a third of SEZ workers received less than minimum wage. In 2004 these issues reached their height and with a combination of labor shortages and a growing understanding of rights led to the outbreak of mass incidents. This included 863 protests across the Guangdong province. These protests involved over 50,000 workers and involved rioting over requests for higher pay and violence due to unpaid wages.

=== Development projects ===
Development projects are one of the main causes of mass incidents as they result in forced land requisition and environmental degradation. This seizure of land leaves homeowners and farmers facing eviction and loss of farmland. Many of these citizens attempt to dispute these projects, claiming they were neither sufficiently compensated nor consulted. Because the government ignored these complaints, the citizens resorted to public demonstrations. In 2003 and 2004 forcible evictions became the reasoning behind a quarter of mass incidents, thus becoming one of the largest sources of civil dissent. This trend continued into 2013, with the highest quantity of mass incidents occurring because of land acquisition and housing demolition.

Within the countryside development projects have left the environment in a state of degradation, destroying farming land, endangering livestock and causing serious health issues for residents. It is estimated that within China there are at least 450 villages, situated near polluting factories, which contain unusually high numbers of cancer patients, known as "cancer villages". This issue resulted in mass incidents such as, the protesting over the pollution created by a battery factory in Zhejiang province in August 2005.

=== Income inequality ===
According to Thomas Lum, China possesses "one of the highest levels of income inequality in Asia". Therefore, poverty and disparity among communities has become a significant factor in influencing the occurrences of mass incidents. This can be accounted for by the inability of individuals of lower economic status to gain access to legitimate means of rectifying their issues. Thus, causing them to instead resort to violence in the form of severe mass incidents, including attacking town government leaders as well as "township government organs."

=== Growth of the legal system ===
The development of China's legal system has been met with an increase in mass incidents. This is due to citizens' increased understanding of legal rights, seen through a rise in appeals to courts over issues of injustice. Despite these developments, China's growth within the law has only managed to delay or fuel social unrest. This is because of corruption within the courts, manifesting through the harassment of lawyers and the lack of enforcement surrounding decisions made in favor of the people. This causes citizens to view mass incidents as their only option in receiving justice.

== Government's response ==
As stated by the Ministry of Public Security General Office Research Department "Mass incidents are currently the most direct, broadest, and deepest real dangers affecting social stability." Yet there are still many issues surrounding the proper handling of mass incidents, owing to tensions between levels of government and (as stated by Thomas Lum) issues of "institutional weakness, inconsistent policies and the inability or unwillingness to undertake political reform." There has been occasional recognition of issues and change of policy by the government. However, the state still holds the right to determine which acts of dissent are acceptable.

In the late 1990s the Shanghai Public Security Bureau put into place several new policies to combat the increase in number and size of mass incidents. These policies acted as guidance to agencies, suggesting they be proactive in assessing local social and economic problems. Leading to the creation of databases concerning potential incidents in order to prevent them occurring at a local level.

Along with China's hosting of the 2008 Olympic Games the government adopted new strategies to improve their control and management of large crowds. Aiding them in their abilities to quell mass incidents with force. With the rapidly increasing numbers of mass incidents the Chinese government instead adopted a more "permissive strategy of containment and management". This meant that more low-key protests were allowed to take place but under strict police observation to ensure the crowds remained peaceful. It also meant that mass arrests were no longer made and instead authorities were to "gather intelligence, intensify policing and quietly detain protests leaders [once] crowds [had] dispersed".

This improved security was also supported by budget increases, in 1988 public security was only awarded 2% of local budgets, this increased to just over 6% in 2010, according to China's Statistical Yearbook. This new budget aided in the decentralization and augmentation of local police forces and lead to updates within technologies, including advanced surveillance apparatus's in the form of traceable identification cards and public cameras.

This regulation of mass incidents also links to internet policing. With the emergence of the digital age there has been an outbreak of mass incidents occurring online, involving campaigns which rally support for the protests occurring and the activists behind the issue. This has caused governments to restrict internet access, censoring information surrounding these mass incidents. This has been ensured through government control of internet providers, leading to the filtering of information concerning any 'undesirable' content, including information that concerns socialism, undermines government power, incites revolt or disrupts social order.

== Examples ==
=== 2007 PX chemical plant protest ===
In November 2006 the construction of a para-xylene (PX) chemical plant was announced in the Haicang District, near the city of Xiamen. This was met with much public concern owing to the environmental effects that would result from the PX plant. Many activists began to take to social media to air their concerns, causing the issue to gain a mass following. This led to a walking protest in June 2007, in which approximately 10,000 citizens participated. Throughout the protest military and local police were present, yet all actions stayed non-violent. These actions caused the plans for the PX plant to undergo review and lead to its eventual relocation inland in 2008.

=== 2008 Weng'an riot ===
On 28 June 2008, a protest in the Weng'an county in Guizhou emerged over government mishandling surrounding the alleged rape and murder of a young girl. The protest transformed into violent demonstrations, involving the vandalism of public security buildings and attacks on police officers, after the attempt of 1,500 riot police to pacify protesters. The demonstrations involved over 30,000 people, many of which had who had not been involved in the original issue, suggesting the long-standing anger held by the population because of the exploitation of the area for its mineral wealth at the expense of the residents. The mass incident resulted in the destruction of over 100 government offices and more than 10 police vehicles.

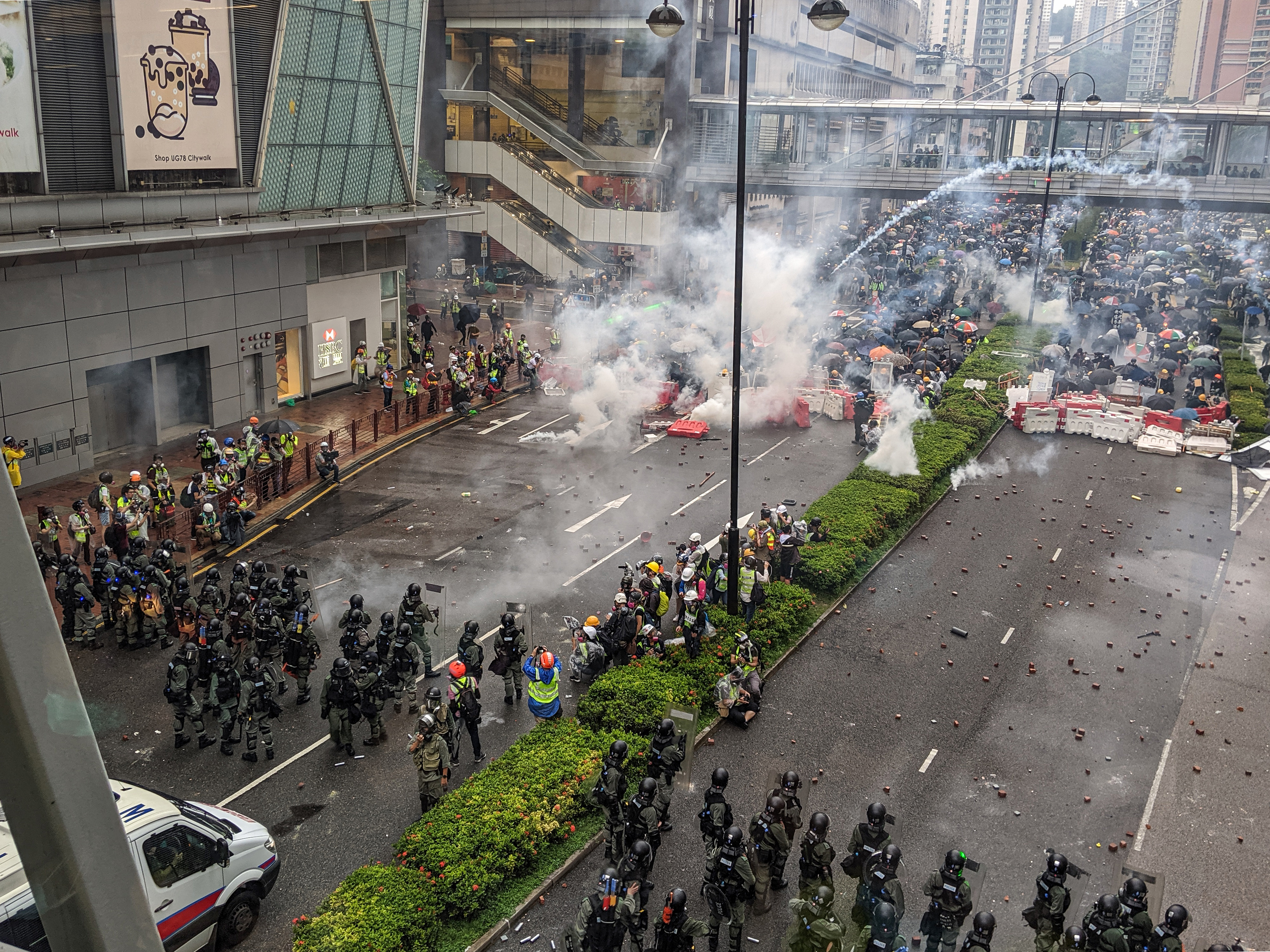
Image of the Hong Kong protests

=== 2019–2020 Hong Kong protests ===
Beginning in June 2019, protests emerged in Hong Kong in response to a proposed extradition bill. The demonstrations grew increasing violent as they continued, with protesters armed with poles, petrol bombs and other weapons clashing with police and attacking businesses perceived as being pro-Beijing. Although the protests caused the Hong Kong government to postpone the plan, they were ultimately unsuccessful.

=== 2022 White paper protests ===
In late November 2022, people across China, including in cities like Shanghai, Beijing, Chengdu, and Wuhan, along with university students nationwide, protested the government's strict zero-COVID measures and denounced the Chinese Communist Party's rule. Demonstrators held blank paper to avoid arrest and reduce risk, resulting in the name "White Paper" protests, and chanted slogans such as "End zero-COVID," "We want human rights," and "Down with the Communist Party!"

After the White Paper protests erupted, the government ended the zero-COVID policy in early December 2022.

== See also ==
- Protest and dissent in China
- Anti-incinerator movement in China
- Weiquan movement
- Stability maintenance
