= Ge Yongxi =

Chinese lawyer

Ge Yongxi (葛永喜) is a Chinese lawyer who is well-known for taking on weiquan cases.

Ge was briefly arrested in April 2016 in the wake of the revelations of the Panama Papers, on charges of "insulting other people." He had posted a picture of the Panama Canal with Photoshopped images of Communist Party leaders, effectively a claim that they had offshore wealth. He was released after 22 hours in detention, after he agreed to sign a guarantee statement that he would not post the picture again.

When Ge became involved in the Wukan village case in June 2016, he wrote on Sina Weibo that he was threatened by the authorities to withdraw from the case. He had been hired by the sons of Lin Zuluan, one of the protest leaders who was arrested by local officials on vague charges.

Ge was detained in Qing'an County, Heilongjiang Province, on June 1, 2015, because of his involvement in attempting to represent lawyers who had been arbitrarily detained by local authorities. Ge was released after a nationwide petition was launched, which 733 lawyers signed on to, calling for his release. This petition was submitted to the Standing Committee of the National People's Congress, calling for an explanation into the circumstances of Ge's arrest.

On September 8, 2015, Ge was blocked from traveling to Hong Kong, and no clear reason was provided. He was questioned about his human rights work, leading to speculation that the reason for the travel ban was related to it.
