= 2012 Wukan municipal election =

Local election in Guangdong, China

- 3 March 2012
- Turnout: 6,800

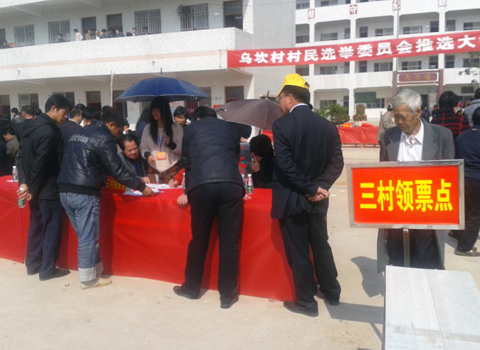
Voting in Wukan 2012

The Wukan municipal election was held in Wukan, People's Republic of China on 3 March 2012 following an uprising against the ruling Chinese Communist Party (CCP) government over alleged land grabs in which protesters forced out the incumbent government; the provincial government then acceded to an election for a committee to govern Wukan after protesters sought an end to what they said was decades of CCP corruption. The election would choose a seven-member village committee, including a village chief and his two deputies, who would control local finances and the sale and apportioning of collectively owned village land.

It was one of the first contested elections held in the Communist-controlled territory in China since the 1948 nationwide elections in the Republican era.

== Background ==
Following the standoff in December 2011 over illegal land sales, protest leader Lin Zulian was named the new Chinese Communist Party Committee Secretary of Wukan. As part of the truce with authorities, the governor of Guangdong province acquiesced to a village election in Wukan—the first of its kind to employ a secret ballot. A series of three elections were planned, which would select 100 representatives to oversee the village's governing committee.

During the first round election on 1 February, some 6,000 Wukan villagers voted for an independent committee to supervise the election for a new seven-member village leadership committee. On 11 February, over 6,500 villagers (85% of the population) voted to elect 107 village representatives, with protester leader Lin Zulian as village party chief replacing the ousted leader (Communist Party secretary Xue Chang, who has been in the position since 1970), after 42 years in office. Xue Jianwan, the daughter of the late protest leader Xue Jinbo, who died in state custody, was also elected. According to The Wall Street Journal writer Josh Chin, the election appeared to be "free of the Communist Party meddling that typically mars Chinese election results."

== Monitors ==
An unidentified U.S. diplomat said that a U.S. observer was sent to oversee the electoral process. The U.S. consul in Guangdong was permitted to observe the election.
