= Donghai Subdistrict, Lufeng =

Donghai Subdistrict 东海街道
- Subdistrict
- Location in Guangdong
- Coordinates: 22°56′40″N 115°38′8″E
- Country: People's Republic of China
- Province: Guangdong
- Prefecture-level city: Shanwei
- County-level city: Lufeng
- Time zone: UTC+8 (China Standard)

Donghai Subdistrict (simplified Chinese: 东海街道; traditional Chinese: 東海街道; pinyin: Dōnghǎi Jiēdào) is a subdistrict in Lufeng, Guangdong, China. As of 2023, it administers the following eight residential communities and fifteen villages:

- Hongwei Community (红卫社区)
- Taoyuan Community (桃园社区)
- Dongfeng Community (东风社区)
- Xiangyang Community (向阳社区)
- Nandi Community (南堤社区)
- Xinguang Community (新光社区)
- Jinlong Community (金龙社区)
- Changhui Community (长辉社区)
- Hongguang Village (红光村)
- Hongxing Village (红星村)
- Kuantang Village (宽塘村)
- Longguang Village (龙光村)
- Shenpu Village (深埔村)
- Bailin Village (白箖村)
- Qisha Village (崎砂村)
- Wukan Village (乌坎村)
- Shanghai Village (上海村)
- Touxiao Village (头肖村)
- Longkou Village (龙口村)
- Yanlong Village (炎龙村)
- Liuyi Village (六驿村)
- Shenchong Village (神冲村)
- Longtan Village (龙潭村)

== See also ==
- List of township-level divisions of Guangdong
