= 2012 Jamaican local elections =

- 26 March 2012

228 Jamaican electoral divisions 13 Parish Councils/Municipal Councils
- Turnout: 572,368 ▼3.2%
	First party	Second party	Third party
Party	PNP	JLP	Independent
Last election	94, 47.4% 3 councils	134, 52.0% 9 councils	0, 0.1% 0 councils
Seats won	151; 12 councils	75; 0 councils	2; 0 councils
Seat change	▲57 ▲9 councils	▼59 ▼9 councils	▲2
Popular vote	318,542	244,649	4,023
Percentage	55.7%	42.7%	0.7%
Swing	▲8.3%	▼9.3%	▲0.6%
- Results by municipal corporation

Local elections were held in Jamaica on 26 March 2012. Directly elected were 228 divisional councillors and the mayor of the municipality of Portmore. Each of the 13 parish councils and parish capital mayoral positions were allocated to a political party. The election was contested mainly between Jamaica's two major political parties, the incumbent People's National Party (PNP), led by Prime Minister Portia Simpson-Miller and the opposition Jamaica Labour Party (JLP), led by Andrew Holness.

Councillor candidates are nominated by political parties in the electoral divisions and are voted on and directly elected by the electorate. The mayor of Portmore is also directly elected. Control of the parish councils depends on the party which controls the majority of the divisions within the parish. The post of mayor of the capital town of the parish is awarded to the party which controls the parish council. The party will then appoint one of its councillors in the parish to be mayor of the town. In the case that neither party holds a majority in a parish council, an elected independent or third party candidate will make the decision of which of the tied political parties should be awarded the mayorship of the capital of the parish. In the case that no independent or third party candidates were elected, the mayorship will be dependent on which party received the higher popular vote in the parish.

== Background ==
Local government elections are constitutionally due every three years so these elections were due to be held on 5 December 2010. however were delayed several times before finally being called by the newly elected PNP government.

The previous elections in 2007 were held just following the JLP's victory in the general election of that year, while these elections followed the 2011 general election in which the PNP gained a supermajority in a landslide.

== Electoral System ==
The elections were conducted under universal suffrage with every adult citizen resident in Jamaica and on the register being permitted to vote. Any commonwealth citizen resident for at east a year in Jamaica was also permitted to vote. The electoral system used was first-past-the-post. Councillor candidates are nominated by political parties in the electoral divisions and are voted on and directly elected by the electorate. The mayor of Portmore is also directly elected. Control of the parish councils depends on the party which controls the majority of the divisions within the parish. The post of mayor of the capital town of the parish is awarded to the party which controls the parish council. The party will then appoint one of its councillors in the parish to be mayor of the town. In the case that neither party holds a majority in a parish council, an elected independent or third party candidate will make the decision of which of the tied political parties should be awarded the mayorship of the capital of the parish. In the case that no independent or third party candidates were elected, the mayorship will be dependent on which party received the higher popular vote in the parish.

== Results ==
The People's National Party secured a landslide victory by winning 151 divisions to the Jamaica Labour Party's 75, in addition to the mayorship of Portmore. The results saw the PNP holding majorities in 12 of the 13 parish councils, with the 13th council, Trelawny, being tied by the two major political parties with one elected independent candidate. It was decided by the independent candidate that the mayorship of Falmouth, the capital of Trelawny, would be awarded to the PNP with the JLP receiving the deputy mayor position.

=== Councillor election ===
==== Parish councils ====
The party which controls each of the 13 parish councils and appoints a mayor for the capital of the parish is the party which wins the majority of divisions in the parish. In the case that neither party holds a majority in a parish council, an elected independent or third party candidate will make the decision of which of the tied political parties should be awarded the mayorship of the capital of the parish. In the case that no independent or third party candidates were elected, the mayorship will be dependent on which party received the higher popular vote in the parish.

Party	Votes	%	Seats			
Party	Votes	%	Seats	+/–	Councils	+/–
People's National Party	318,097	55.99	151	+57	12	+9
Jamaica Labour Party	245,717	43.25	75	–58	0	–10
Marcus Garvey People's Political Party	280	0.05	0	New	0	New
Independents	4,047	0.71	2	+2	0	0
Total	568,141	100.00	228	+1	12	0

===== By parish =====
Parish council	PNP	JLP	Other	Mayorship	Deputy Mayorship
Kingston and St. Andrew Corporation	26	14	0	PNP	PNP
St. Catherine	15	14	0	PNP	PNP
St. Thomas	7	3	0	PNP	PNP
Portland	5	4	0	PNP	PNP
St. Mary	8	5	0	PNP	PNP
St. Ann	11	5	0	PNP	PNP
Trelawny	4	4	1	PNP	JLP
St. James	13	4	0	PNP	PNP
Hanover	5	1	1	PNP	PNP
Clarendon	12	10	0	PNP	PNP
Manchester	11	4	0	PNP	PNP
St. Elizabeth	9	6	0	PNP	PNP
Westmoreland	14	0	0	PNP	PNP
Total	151	75	2	PNP: 13; JLP: 0	PNP: 12; JLP: 1
Source: Jamaica Gleaner

==== Portmore mayoral election ====
Portmore Municipal Council Election, 2012
- 26 March 2013

All 12 seats in the Portmore Municipal Council 7 seats needed for a majority
	First party	Second party	Third party
Leader	George Lee	Keith Hinds	Alrick Davis
Party	PNP	JLP	Independent
Last election	41.7%	58.3%	0%
Seats before	5	6	0
Seats won	11	1	0
Seat change	▲6	▼6	-
Popular vote	15, 011	8, 287	216
Percentage	63.84%	35.24%	.71%
Swing	▲15.15	▼16.07	▲0.71%

The Mayor of Portmore is the chairman of the Portmore Municipal Council, the legislative body for the city. The Mayor is directly elected based on popular vote and is tasked with setting the policies and by-laws that will affect the city, as it relates to: road maintenance, parks, property taxes, etc...

Despite being within the Saint Catherine, due to its population; Portmore was granted city status and 'independence' from the Saint Catherine Parish Council.
