= Protest and dissent in China =

Protesters and dissidents in the People's Republic of China (PRC) espouse a wide variety of grievances, most commonly in the areas of unpaid wages, compensation for land development, local environmental activism, or NIMBY activism. Tens of thousands of protests occur each year in what the authorities term "mass incidents." Nationwide protests are less common. Notable protests have included the 1959 Tibetan uprising, the 1989 Tiananmen Square protests and massacre, the April 1999 demonstration by Falun Gong practitioners at Zhongnanhai, the 2008 Tibetan unrest, the July 2009 Ürümqi riots, the 2011 pro-democracy protests, and the 2022 COVID-19 protests.

== Overview ==
Tens of thousands of protests occur each year in the PRC. Generally, they are driven by local disputes as opposed to national issues. The most common sources of protests are unpaid wage issues, disputes over compensation for land development, local environmental activism, or NIMBY activism. Protests often result in at least partial success in achieving their objectives.

The number of annual protests has grown steadily since the early 1990s, from approximately 8,700 "mass group incidents" in 1993 to over 87,000 in 2005. In 2006, the Chinese Academy of Social Sciences estimated the number of annual mass incidents to exceed 90,000, and Chinese sociology professor Sun Liping estimated 180,000 incidents in 2010. Mass incidents are defined broadly as "planned or impromptu gathering that forms because of internal contradictions", and can include public speeches or demonstrations, physical clashes, public airings of grievances, and other group behaviors that are seen as disrupting social stability.

Despite the increase in protests, some scholars have argued that they may not pose an existential threat to Chinese Communist Party (CCP) rule because they lack "connective tissue"; the preponderance of protests in China are aimed at local-level officials, and only a select few dissident movements seek systemic change. In a study conducted by Chinese academic Li Yao, released in 2017, the majority of protests which were non-controversial did not receive much if any negative police action, which is to say police may have been present but in no more capacity than Western police would be attending to a protest/mass gathering event. The idea that Chinese do not protest or would be brutally repressed for any kind of political action does not seem to be supported by existing data.

== Tactics ==
Protests targeting specific, local grievances, and where citizens propose actionable remedies, are more likely to succeed than alternative forms of protests.

As the rights consciousness of the Chinese populace has grown since the 1980s and 1990s, a growing number of citizens have adopted semi-institutionalized forms of protest known as rightful resistance, whereby they make use of the court system, petitioning channels, or of central government decrees and policies to bring grievances against local authorities.

The failure of semi-institutionalized means of protest can eventually lead citizens to adopt more overt and public forms of resistance, such as sit-ins, picketing, coordinated hunger strikes, or marches.

An analysis of World Values Survey data from 2007, 2012–2013, and 2018 found that the signing of a petition was the most common form of protest activity reported by Chinese respondents. Among the years analyzed, the amount of respondents who had signed a petition or might sign a petition was its highest in 2018 at 52%.

In isolated instances disaffected citizens have turned to rioting, bombings of government buildings and related targets, or suicide as a form of protest. In December 2011, residents of the village of Wukan expelled CCP authorities following land requisition protests.

In the case of nationalist protests, citizens have engaged in boycotts against foreign goods or companies, officially sanctioned marches, and occasionally targeted foreign embassies for violence.

Technology has become an increasingly important part of the arsenal of Chinese protesters and dissidents. Some protests occur almost entirely in the realm of online activism and engagement, taking the form of citizens signing online petitions, issuing statements online rejecting the CCP, of signing support for dissident manifestos like Charter 08. Cyber-vigilantes make use of the internet to publicize and publicly shame government officials and others who are perceived as corrupt, have committed human rights abuses, or have otherwise offended collective values. Text messages have also been used to organize and coordinate protests.

== Rural protests ==
According to a 2011 survey conducted by Landesa, in cooperation with Renmin University of China and Michigan State University, which covered 1,791 households in 17 provinces, "about 43 percent" of villagers across China report being the victims of land grabs by the Government, which then sold it to private developers at an average cost of 40x higher per acre than the government paid to the villagers. The same survey claims that, "according to Chinese researchers", an estimated 65 percent of the 180,000 annual "mass incidents" in China stem from grievances over forced land requisitions. Together with their previous surveys, Landesa observes a steady increase in the number of forced land requisitions since 2005. They also estimate that, every year, local government expropriates the land of approximately 4 million rural Chinese citizens.

In 2025, protests erupted in ethnic Miao communities in rural Guizhou over the government's directive to mandate cremation over traditional burial practices.

== Labor protests ==
Labor protests in China's industrial sector are common, as migrant workers resist low wages or poor working conditions. There are trade unions in China, but they consist of CCP cadres. Trade unions are supposedly an extension of the CCP in companies, factories and general management.

Disputes over unpaid wages are among the most common causes of protest in China.

In the late 1990s, mass layoffs from state-owned enterprises (sometimes without the promised compensation or pensions to those laid off) as a result of the state's Xiagang (下岗: step down from the post) policy has sparked numerous worker protests. Among the policies introduced in response to the protests included dibao, a minimum living standard guarantee for those with no income and living in difficult conditions which was introduced in 1999.

In the early 2000s, migrant farmers farmers increasingly organized protests to local authorities and, viewing their concerns as not being addressed, traveled to Beijing to provide complaint letters to the central government. As part of the policy response to these protests, the government cracked down on employers who failed to pay migrant workers or paid them late.

In March 2010, employees of the Chinese Honda plant went on a strike, demanding a pay raise and a self-chosen union. One employee mentioned that Honda had been willing to compromise, but the government in Guangdong had spoken out against wage increases, fearing that similar demands could be made in other companies. According to media reports, the number of workers' strikes rose to a record level in 2015. The China Labor Bulletin mentioned 2,509 strikes and protests by workers and employees in China. The main reason for these strikes is said to have been because of many factory closures and layoffs.

In 2011, many migrant workers did not return to their workplace in Guangzhou, in southern China, after the New Year holidays. The reason for this is said to have been that more job opportunities had been created in the hitherto poorer provinces. Thus, many no longer had to go to other areas to work and earn a living. It is said to have been 30 to 40 percent fewer migrant workers, normally 10 to 15 percent, although China's authorities had raised the minimum wages. As a result, foreign companies moved their production facilities to Southeast Asia into "cheaper" provinces or even abroad. China experts at the investment bank Credit Suisse called this change a "historic turning point" both for China's economy and possibly for the world.

Between 2023 and 2025, China experienced a significant increase in labor protests, primarily driven by economic slowdown, factory closures, and widespread issues of unpaid wages in the manufacturing and construction sectors. In the first half of 2023 alone, over 700 strikes were recorded, nearly equaling the total number for all of 2022, and by the end of that year, protests had more than tripled. The trend continued into 2024 and 2025, exacerbated by U.S. tariffs on Chinese goods that led to further industrial shutdowns and mass layoffs. Workers across provinces such as Guangdong, Zhejiang, Hunan, Sichuan, and Inner Mongolia demonstrated over grievances including wage arrears, unfair dismissals, and inadequate social security coverage. By late 2024, economic-related labor unrest accounted for the majority of protest activity nationwide, with workers representing 41% of all dissent incidents.

The year 2023 marked the highest level of strike activity in China since 2016, with a significant rise in factory strikes, particularly concentrated in coastal regions such as the Pearl River Delta and the Yangtze River Delta. According to the China Labour Bulletin, 434 factory strikes were recorded in 2023, compared to 37 in 2022 and 66 in 2021. Approximately 80 percent of these incidents occurred in the southeast coastal region.

According to the China Dissent Monitor, 777 labor protests were recorded in China between September and December 2023, a significant increase from 245 during the same period in 2022. Supplementary data from the Hong Kong-based China Labour Bulletin documented a further 183 labor protests between January 1 and February 3, 2024, including 40 incidents in Guangdong province alone.

In February 2024, an estimated 3,000 North Koreans in China protested labor conditions and for the right to return to North Korea. These workers were contract laborers who were employed by a company affiliated with the North Korean military, and had been in China for an extended period of time due to the COVID-19 lockdowns and because the North Korean government wanted them to stay longer to generate more revenue.

== Political liberalization and democracy movements ==
=== Democracy Wall ===
The Democracy Wall movement of November 1978 to spring 1981 is usually regarded as the beginning of China's contemporary democracy movement. The Democracy Wall movement focused on the elimination of bureaucratism and the bureaucratic class. Although Democracy Wall participants agreed that "democracy" was the means to resolve this conflict between the bureaucratic class and the people, the nature of the proposed democratic institutions was a major source of disagreement. A majority of participants in the movement favored viewed the movement as part of a struggle between correct and incorrect notions of Marxism. Many participants advocated classical Marxist views that drew on the Paris Commune for inspiration. The Democracy Wall movement also included non-Marxists and anti-Marxists, although these participants were a minority. Demands for "democracy" were frequent but without an agreed-upon meaning. Participants in the movement variously associated the concept of democracy with socialism, communism, liberal democracy, capitalism, and Christianity. They drew on a diverse range of intellectual resources "ranging from classical Marxist and socialist traditions to Enlightenment philosophers, [socialist] experiments in Yugoslavia, and Western liberal democracy." Significant documents of the Democracy Wall movement include The Fifth Modernization manifesto by Wei Jingsheng.

=== 1980s protest movement and student demonstrations ===
China's reform and opening up had major socio-economic impacts. As living standards improved, the new business class and increasingly independent intellectuals sought further political and economic relaxation. Simultaneously, public grievances developed as a mostly unitary society became more stratified, with uneven economic development and rising inflation which impacted the purchasing power of a large segment of the population. Generally, the resulting 1980s protest movement sought to gradually liberalize and open up Chinese Communist governance, as opposed to .

In 1986 through 1987, students organized demonstrations arguing for a higher degree of political liberalization, freedom of speech, freedom of the press, and academic freedom. This movement was influenced by intellectuals such as Wang Rowang and Fang Lizhi.

=== 1989 Tiananmen Square protests and massacre ===
The 1989 Tiananmen Square protests arose in the context of the 1980s protest movement. The events began with sporadic student demonstrations in Tiananmen Square in Beijing following the death of former reformist leader and CCP general secretary Hu Yaobang. On 26 April, a front page editorial in People's Daily referred to the protests as anti-CCP rebellions, outraging the protestors who sought political concessions and official reassessment of their movement. On 13 May 1989, thousands of student protestors began a hunger strike, disrupting the state visit of Mikhail Gorbachev in the 1989 Sino-Soviet Summit. Protests spread to other cities and on 20 May, China declared martial law and deployed the army to Beijing. Tensions escalated, and on 4 June the army violently suppressed the protests. Thousands were likely killed, although estimates vary.

The majority of protestors sought for the government to listen to their concerns, with few advocating for the overthrow of the CCP, although such demands increased as the protests continued. On the government side, Zhao Ziyang sought to negotiate with protestors to resolve the situation. Li Peng argued for suppressing the protests through martial law, and was joined by Deng Xiaoping who ordered its imposition.

=== 2011 Chinese pro-democracy protests ===
In February 2011, a month of pro-democracy protests took place in Beijing, inspired by the Tunisian Revolution.

=== 2011 Wukan protests ===
In 2011, the village of Wukan temporarily threw out its unelected leaders, and elected its leadership for a period.

=== 2022 Sitong Bridge protest ===
On 13 October 2022, a protest on Sitong Bridge in Beijing was held by a protestor who posted a banner on the bridge and burnt tyres. Information on the protest spread rapidly on online social media and was quickly censored by Chinese authorities. Similar protest slogans subsequently appeared as graffiti in other cities in China and via AirDrop.

=== 2022 protests against COVID-19 lockdowns ===
In November 2022, following the 2022 Ürümqi fire, solidarity protests against the government's Zero-COVID policies erupted in Ürümqi and across the country. In Shanghai, hundreds chanted "Step down, Xi Jinping! Step down, Communist Party!"

=== 2025 Chongqing anti-CCP protest ===
At approximately 22:00 on August 29, 2025 (Beijing time), in Xijie, Chongqing University Town, Shapingba District, Chongqing, China, an individual used a projector to display slogans critical of the Chinese Communist Party onto the exterior wall of a building. The projection lasted about 50 minutes before being stopped by the authorities, and attracted considerable public attention.

== Falun Gong ==
Among the most vocal and consistent opponents of the CCP rule in the last decade are practitioners of Falun Gong. Falun Gong is a qigong-based practice of meditation with a moral philosophy based on Buddhist traditions. It was popularized in China in the 1990s, and by 1999, it was estimated to have 70 million practitioners.

Some among the CCP's leadership were wary of the group's popularity, independence from the state, and spiritual philosophy, and from 1996 to 1999, the practice faced varying degrees of harassment from CCP authorities and public security bureaus and criticism in the state-run media. Falun Gong practitioners responded to media criticism by picketing local government or media offices, and were often successful in gaining retractions. One such demonstration in April 1999 was broken up by security forces in Tianjin, and several dozen Falun Gong practitioners were beaten and arrested. In response, on 25 April Falun Gong mobilized the largest demonstration in China since 1989, gathering silently outside the Zhongnanhai central government compound to request official recognition and an end to the escalating harassment against them. Falun Gong representatives met with Premier Zhu Rongji, and reached an agreement. CCP general secretary Jiang Zemin reportedly criticized Zhu for being "too soft," however, and ordered that Falun Gong be defeated. On 20 July 1999, the CCP leadership initiated a campaign to eradicate the group through a combination of propaganda, imprisonment, torture, and other coercive methods.

In the first two years of the crackdown, Falun Gong practitioners in China responded by petitioning local, provincial, and national appeals offices. Efforts at petitioning were often met with imprisonment, leading the group to shift tactics by staging daily, non-violent demonstrations in Tiananmen Square. These demonstrations, which typically involved practitioners holding banners or staging meditation sit-ins, were broken up, often violently, by security agents. By late 2001, Falun Gong largely abandoned protests in Tiananmen Square, but continued a quiet resistance against the persecution campaign. Although the group claims to have no political orientation or ambitions, it has since 2004 actively advocated for an end to CCP rule.

== Anti-Japanese protests ==
Following the 1990 incident in which the Japanese Maritime Safety Agency intended to recognize as official a lighthouse built on the disputed Senkaku islands by a right-wing Japanese group, protests occurred in Taiwan, Hong Kong, Macau, and the United States. The Chinese government prevented large scale protests in the PRC and censored news reports of protests by overseas Chinese (although British Broadcasting Corporation reports and Voice of America reports meant that the Chinese public continued to be aware of media reports on the issue). In Beijing, students distributed handbills and put up posters criticizing the CCP for being "soft" on Japan.

The 2005 anti-Japanese demonstrations showcased anti-Japanese sentiment. These anti-Japan protests demonstrated the mood of the Chinese against Japan. These protests broke out in China and spread from Beijing to the southern province Guangdong. Demonstrators are said to have been furious about Japanese war history books and have thrown stones at the Japanese embassy in Beijing. In 2005, a protest was held in Beijing against the distortion of Japan's wartime past and against Tokyo's candidacy for a permanent seat on the UN Security Council. Several thousand Chinese are said to have marched through Beijing and called for a boycott of Japanese goods.

=== 2012 protests ===
From August to September 2012, a series of anti-Japanese demonstrations were held across more than 100 cities in the People's Republic of China. The main cause of the demonstrations was the escalation of the Senkaku Islands dispute between China and Japan around the time of the anniversary of the Mukden Incident of 1931, which was the de facto catalyst to the Japanese invasion of Manchuria, culminating in a decisive Japanese victory vis-à-vis total consolidation and annexation of Manchuria. Protesters in several cities later became violent and local authorities began arresting demonstrators and banning the demonstrations.

== Hong Kong ==
Ever since Hong Kong's transfer of sovereignty from the United Kingdom to the People's Republic of China in 1997, a number of social and political movements arose during the first two decades of Chinese rule in Hong Kong.

=== 2014 protests ===
A series of sit-in street protests, often called the Umbrella Revolution and sometimes used interchangeably with Umbrella Movement, or Occupy Movement, occurred in Hong Kong from 26 September to 15 December 2014.

=== 2019–2020 protests ===
The 2019–20 Hong Kong protests were a large series of demonstrations against the Hong Kong government's introduction of a bill that would have made it legal for Hong Kong to extradite criminal suspects to mainland China. These protests were the largest in the history of Hong Kong. Protestors objected to the proposed bill on the grounds that the mainland PRC "justice system is marked by torture, forced confessions, arbitrary detentions and unfair trials." There were massive street protests and violent clashes between protesters and the police, with the 16 June protest consisting of 5 percent (according to the police) or 30 percent (according to the organizers) of the full 7 million population of Hong Kong. Months of demonstrations convinced the then Hong Kong leader Carrie Lam to suspend the bill, however, the movement continued as her government refused to answer the other four demands made by protesters. The protests eventually reached a halt when the COVID-19 pandemic hit, leading to the enactment of the Hong Kong national security law and a series of crackdowns on pro-democracy protesters, activists, and news media.

== Other protests ==
Protests against the United States were held in China during the Cuban Missile Crisis.

During the 2000s, involuntary resettlement due to urbanization and rural policy changes for development and environmental matters was a significant source of protest. Policy responses to these protests included cash compensation, housing relocation, employment arrangements, social insurance contributions, and "land for social security" arrangements.

In 2011, the "October Rising" seller protest against e-commerce platform company Taobao occurred. With the goal of reducing counterfeits and substandard products, Taobao had increased the Taobao Mall membership fees for sellers and their required cash deposits. The rule changes were made without warning. Approximately 50,000 sellers formed the "anti-Taobao alliance" for digital protest actions and in-person protest at Alibaba's headquarters. The Chinese government mediated the dispute, resulting in Taobao revising its seller fees and providing 1.8 billion RMB in support for small businesses using the platform.

Following the 2016 result of the South China Sea arbitration, Kentucky Fried Chicken ("KFC") restaurants in Chinese cities became locations for public protests. Protestors denounced what they viewed as United States interference in China's sovereignty issues. Viewing KFC as symbolic of American presence in China, the protestors called for a boycott of the restaurant chain.

Until early 2018, there were widespread protests by military veterans in China seeking better pensions and other benefits. A frequent protest tactic was to demonstrate at tourist sites. In response to the protests, the central government established the Ministry of Veterans Affairs in March 2018.

Following public criticism and a 2018 inquiry from the State Administration of Market Regulation, the e-commerce company Pinduoduo increased efforts to prevent sales of counterfeit goods on its platform. Those efforts included a penalty on sellers of ten times the trading value of goods deemed counterfeit. One thousand sellers responded with a protest in July 2018 at the company's headquarters, during which there were physical clashes between protestors and the company's security guards.

== Online protests ==
A number of prominent Chinese dissidents, scholars, and rights defenders, and artists maintain blogs to which they post essays and criticisms of the CCP. One innovative use of the internet as a medium for protest was a video created by artist Ai Weiwei, in which different Chinese citizens were filmed reading the names of victims from the 2008 Sichuan earthquake, who died due to poor school construction.

Several high-profile instances of human rights abuses have sparked online protests. The 2009 arrest of 21-year-old Deng Yujiao, who killed a local government official in self-defense when he tried to sexually assault her, sparked outrage among Chinese netizens, resulting in some four million posts online. As a result of the national outcry, police released Deng Yujiao on bail on May 26 and put her under house arrest. Prosecutors reduced her charge to the lesser offense of "intentional assault" instead of murder.

Internet vigilantes dubbed human flesh search engines seek to exact justice against corrupt authorities or other individuals by posting personal information about the offenders, and inviting the public to use this information to humiliate and shame them.

In 2008, a pro-democracy manifesto authored by a group of intellectuals titled Charter 08 circulated online, eventually collecting approximately 10,000 signatures and earning one of its authors, Liu Xiaobo, a Nobel Peace Prize.

Among the mechanisms Chinese internet users use to express dissent online is through content superficially flattering to the party-state or official positions, but which in fact is made deliberately illogical or distasteful in order to mock the party or the government. Official discourses describe this practice as gaoji hei (Chinese: 高级黑; lit. 'high-level black').

== See also ==
- Siege of Wukan, 2011
- Zhejiang solar panel plant protest, 2011
