= Jiaxi =

Jiaxi 甲西镇
- Town
- Location in Guangdong
- Coordinates: 22°52′17″N 116°03′39″E
- Country: People's Republic of China
- Province: Guangdong
- Prefecture-level city: Shanwei
- County-level city: Lufeng
- Time zone: UTC+8 (China Standard)

Jiaxi (Chinese: 甲西; pinyin: Jiǎxī) is a town in Lufeng, Guangdong province, China. As of 2018, it had 22 villages under its administration.

== See also ==
- List of township-level divisions of Guangdong
