= Lufeng, Guangdong =

Lufeng 陆丰市 Lok Hong
- County-level & Sub-prefectural city
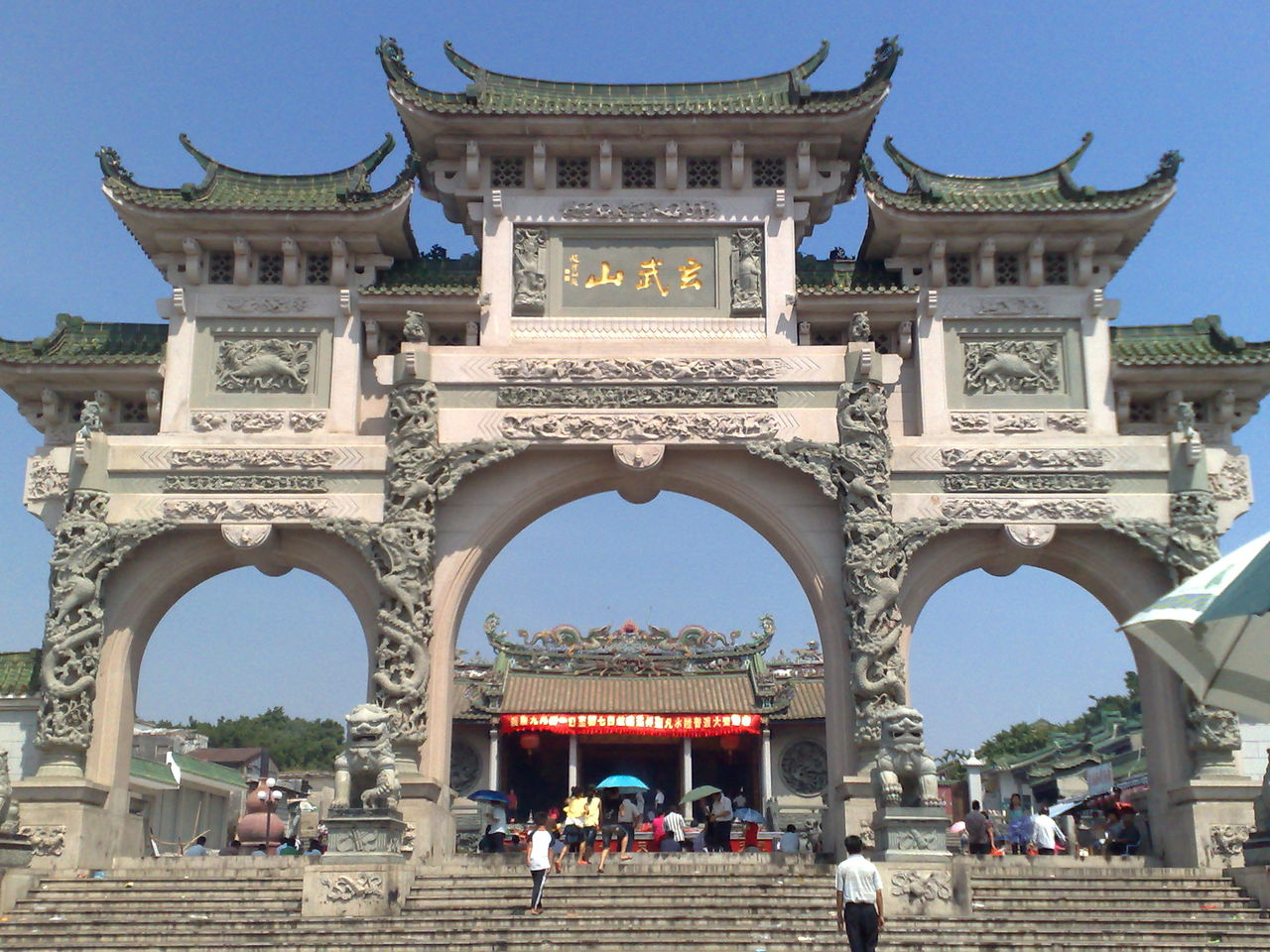
- The entrance to Xuanwu Mountain in Jieshi

- Location in Guangdong
- Coordinates: 22°55′08″N 115°39′08″E
- Country: People's Republic of China
- Province: Guangdong
- Prefecture-level city: Shanwei

Area
  - Total: 1,681 km^{2} (649 sq mi)
- Time zone: UTC+8 (China Standard)

Lufeng
- Simplified Chinese: 陆丰
- Traditional Chinese: 陸豐
- Hanyu Pinyin: Lùfēng
- Cantonese Yale: Luhkfūng
- Postal: Lukfung
- Literal meaning: Continental Abundance
Transcriptions
Standard Mandarin
- Hanyu Pinyin: Lùfēng
- Gwoyeu Romatzyh: Luhfeng
- Wade–Giles: Lu^{4}-fêng^{1}
- IPA: [lû.fə́ŋ]
Yue: Cantonese
- Yale Romanization: Luhkfūng
- Jyutping: Luk6fung1
- IPA: [lʊk̚˨.fʊŋ˥]

Lufeng, alternately romanized as Lukfung in Cantonese, (Note: The Postal Map spelling was based on the name's local Cantonese pronunciation. Other romanizations include Lu-feng, Luh-fung, and Luh Fung.) is a county-level city in the southeast of Guangdong province, administered as a part of the prefecture-level city of Shanwei. It lies on the mainland on coast of the South China Sea east of Hong Kong.

== History ==
Under the Qing, the area was known as Lufeng County. Together with neighboring Haifeng and the now separated Luhe county now carved out from Lufeng, it formed the short-lived Hailufeng Soviet in 1927. It was later promoted to county-level city status.

The area rose to prominence in the early 21st century as a scene of unrest. Jieshi saw serious inter-village violence over road use in October 2009 and March 2010 and, in September 2011, a series of protests or riots occurred in Wukan Village over allegations of Communist Party members unfairly selling farmers' land for development. Fresh protests broke out in December, when one of the village leaders died in the police custody. The police blocked the roads leading to the village.

== Administration ==
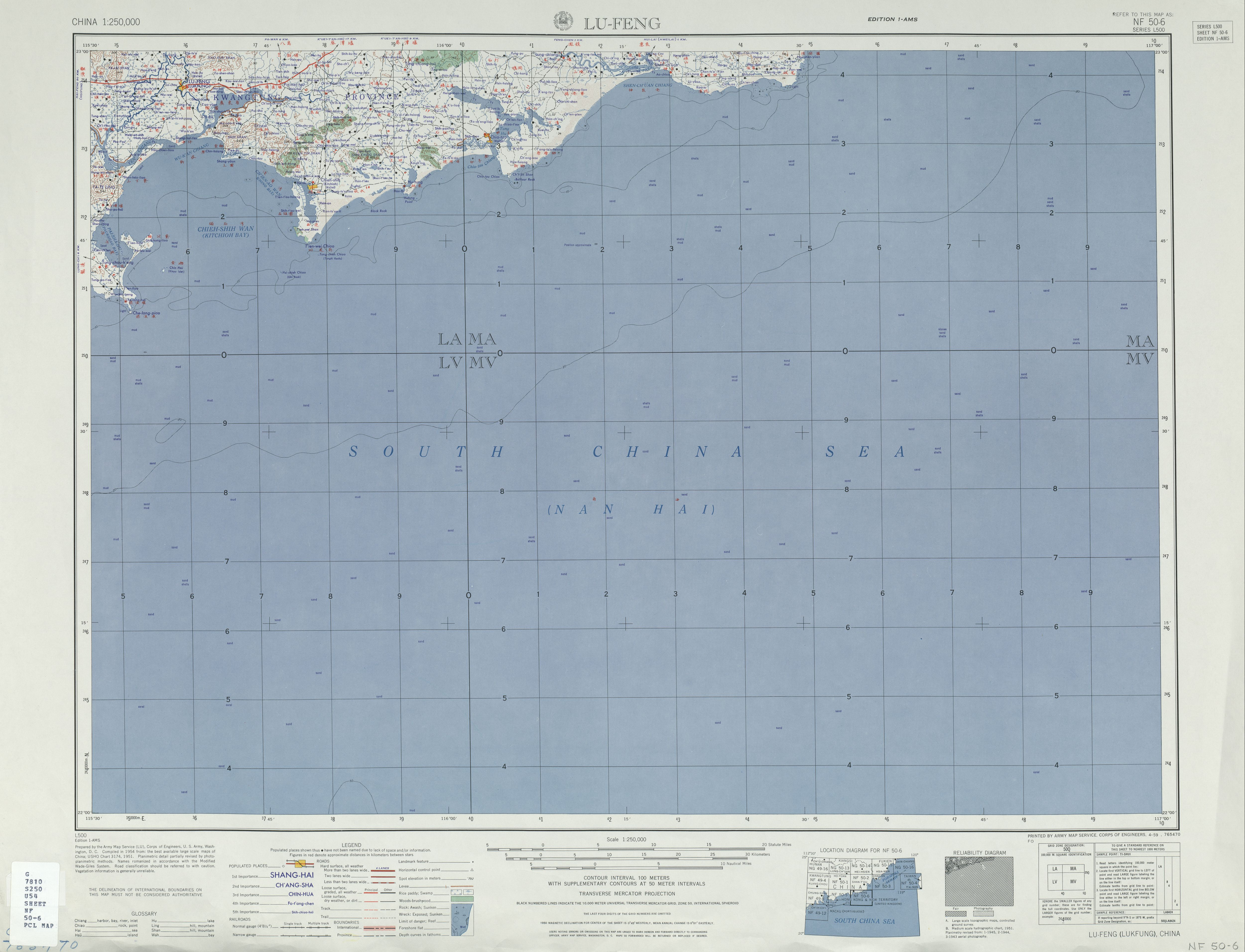
Lufeng (labelled as LU-FENG (LUKFUNG) 陸豐) (1954)

As of 2005 year's end, the city comprises three urban subdistricts and 17 towns. These are organised into 47 neighbourhood committees and 280 village committees.

The city's executive, legislature and judiciary are located in the Donghai Subdistrict (东海街道), together with the CPC subbranch and PSB suboffice. Wukan Village, site of the Wukan protests, is also located in the Donghai subdistrict.

=== Urban subdistricts ===
- Donghai (东海)
- Chengdong (城东)
- Hexi (河西)

=== Towns ===
- Jieshi (碣石)
- Qiaochong (桥冲)
- Bomei (博美)
- Jiazi (Kapchi; Chiatzu) (甲子)
- Jiadong (甲东)
- Jiaxi (甲西镇)
- Hudong (湖东)
- Beiyang (陂洋)
- Nantang (南塘)
- Bawan (八万)
- Tanxi (潭西)
- Da'an (大安)
- Jinxiang (金厢)
- Neihu (内湖)
- Xinan (西南)
- Shangying (上英)
- Hedong (河东)

== Demography ==
Lufeng has a population of 1.7 million, mostly Han Chinese. More specifically, a considerable percentage of the population belong to the Hoklo people; the rest are Teochew, Hakka and Junjiahua speakers.

Haklau, Teochew and Hakka are spoken, in addition to Standard Mandarin, which is used in official and public life. The Hailufeng dialect, however, only refers to the Hokkien variant.

== Climate ==
Climate data for Lufeng, elevation 32 m (105 ft), (1991–2020 normals, extremes 1962–present)
Month	Jan	Feb	Mar	Apr	May	Jun	Jul	Aug	Sep	Oct	Nov	Dec	Year
Record high °C (°F)	28.7 (83.7)	29.4 (84.9)	31.2 (88.2)	32.5 (90.5)	34.1 (93.4)	36.0 (96.8)	37.8 (100.0)	37.8 (100.0)	36.6 (97.9)	34.7 (94.5)	32.7 (90.9)	29.3 (84.7)	37.8 (100.0)
Mean daily maximum °C (°F)	20.3 (68.5)	20.8 (69.4)	22.9 (73.2)	26.3 (79.3)	29.4 (84.9)	31.1 (88.0)	32.5 (90.5)	32.5 (90.5)	32.0 (89.6)	29.7 (85.5)	26.3 (79.3)	22.0 (71.6)	27.2 (80.9)
Daily mean °C (°F)	15.0 (59.0)	16.0 (60.8)	18.5 (65.3)	22.2 (72.0)	25.6 (78.1)	27.7 (81.9)	28.8 (83.8)	28.5 (83.3)	27.5 (81.5)	24.7 (76.5)	21.0 (69.8)	16.7 (62.1)	22.7 (72.8)
Mean daily minimum °C (°F)	11.7 (53.1)	13.0 (55.4)	15.6 (60.1)	19.5 (67.1)	22.9 (73.2)	25.3 (77.5)	26.0 (78.8)	25.7 (78.3)	24.5 (76.1)	21.4 (70.5)	17.5 (63.5)	13.2 (55.8)	19.7 (67.5)
Record low °C (°F)	0.9 (33.6)	3.9 (39.0)	2.8 (37.0)	9.6 (49.3)	14.4 (57.9)	18.6 (65.5)	21.8 (71.2)	21.7 (71.1)	17.9 (64.2)	11.6 (52.9)	6.2 (43.2)	1.0 (33.8)	0.9 (33.6)
Average precipitation mm (inches)	36.8 (1.45)	46.5 (1.83)	94.6 (3.72)	152.1 (5.99)	257.1 (10.12)	502.6 (19.79)	318.5 (12.54)	362.3 (14.26)	167.8 (6.61)	33.2 (1.31)	27.3 (1.07)	31.0 (1.22)	2,029.8 (79.91)
Average precipitation days (≥ 0.1 mm)	5.5	8.8	11.2	12.7	15.4	18.4	17.7	17.0	11.3	4.7	4.6	5.5	132.8
Average relative humidity (%)	72	76	79	81	83	85	83	83	78	72	72	69	78
Mean monthly sunshine hours	154.3	112.7	105.9	116.3	139.9	162.0	213.9	198.6	189.5	204.8	181.4	167.5	1,946.8
Percentage possible sunshine	46	35	28	30	34	40	52	50	52	57	55	50	44
Source: China Meteorological Administrationall-time extremes

== Transportation ==
Lufeng railway station on the Xiamen–Shenzhen railway serves the city, though it is located some distance outside the city.

Lufeng East and Lufeng South, both on the Shantou–Shanwei high-speed railway, will serve the city in the future.

== Notable people ==
- Wong Yuk-man, Hong Kong politician
- Charles Heung, actor-turned-film producer and presenter
- Ada Zhuang, C-pop artist
- Liu Shan Bang, leader of the 1857 Chinese uprising against James Brooke.

== See also ==
- Boshe, a village notorious for being a meth lab in Jiaxi
- Wukan protests
