= 2012 San Diego City Attorney election =

- June 5, 2012
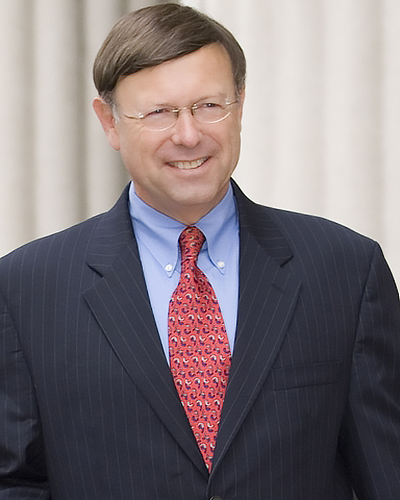
Nominee	Jan Goldsmith
Party	Republican
Popular vote	182,787
Percentage	100%
City Attorney before election
Jan Goldsmith
Republican
Elected City Attorney
Jan Goldsmith
Republican

The 2012 San Diego City Attorney election occurred on Tuesday, June 5, 2012. Incumbent city attorney Jan Goldsmith ran unopposed and was reelected.

Municipal elections in California are officially non-partisan, although most members do identify a party preference. A two-round system was used for the election, starting with a primary in June followed by a runoff in November between the top-two candidates if no candidate received a majority in the primary. Because Goldsmith ran unopposed, he was elected outright in June with no need for a runoff election.

== Results ==
2012 San Diego City Attorney election
Party	Candidate	Votes	%
Republican	Jan Goldsmith	182,787	100%
Total votes		182,787	100%
