= November 2012 San Francisco general election =

San Francisco elections

The November 2012 San Francisco general elections were on November 6, 2012, in San Francisco, California. The elections included six seats to the San Francisco Board of Supervisors, four seats to the San Francisco Board of Education, four seats to the San Francisco Community College Board, and seven San Francisco ballot measures.

== Board of education ==
Three incumbents ran for reelection, while one, Norman Yee, ran for a seat on the San Francisco Board of Supervisors. Each voter was allowed to cast up to four votes.

San Francisco Board of Education elections, 2012
| Candidate | Votes | % |
|---|---|---|
| Sandra Lee Fewer (incumbent) | 128,500 | 16.94 |
| Jill Wynns (incumbent) | 106,531 | 14.04 |
| Rachel Norton (incumbent) | 102,033 | 13.45 |
| Matt Haney | 100,552 | 13.25 |
| Kim Garcia-Meza | 59,930 | 7.90 |
| Shamann Walton | 58,194 | 7.67 |
| Sam Rodriguez | 50,554 | 6.66 |
| Gladys Soto | 49,839 | 6.57 |
| Beverly Popek | 36,059 | 4.75 |
| Victoria Lo | 35,779 | 4.72 |
| Paul Robertson | 29,562 | 3.90 |
| Write-in | 1,164 | 3.90 |
| Turnout | {{{votes}}} | 72.56% |

== Community College Board ==
Three incumbents ran for reelection, while one, Rodrigo Santos, is seeking his first election after being appointed by Mayor Ed Lee. Each voter was allowed to cast up to four votes.

San Francisco Community College Board elections, 2012
| Candidate | Votes | % |
|---|---|---|
| Steve Ngo (incumbent) | 103,030 | 14.63 |
| Rafael Mandelman | 96,053 | 13.64 |
| Natalie Berg (incumbent) | 95,259 | 13.53 |
| Chris Jackson (incumbent) | 91,069 | 12.93 |
| Amy Bacharach | 90,485 | 12.85 |
| Rodrigo Santos (incumbent) | 56,755 | 8.06 |
| Nate Cruz | 55,426 | 7.87 |
| William Walker | 49,430 | 7.02 |
| Hanna Leung | 47,643 | 6.77 |
| George Vazhappally | 17,904 | 2.54 |
| Turnout | {{{votes}}} | 72.56% |

== Propositions ==
Note: "City" refers to the San Francisco municipal government.

=== Proposition A ===
Proposition A would levy an annual $79 parcel tax for eight years to provide funding for several City College of San Francisco programs. This measure required a two-thirds majority to pass.

Proposition A
| Choice | Votes | % |
|---|---|---|
| For | 242,410 | 72.90 |
| Against | 90,134 | 27.10 |
| Required majority | | 66.67 |
| Total | 332,544 | 100.00 |
| Valid votes | 332,544 | 92.61 |
| Invalid/blank votes | 26,530 | 7.39 |
| Total votes | 359,074 | 100.00 |
| Registered voters/turnout | | 71.41 |

=== Proposition B ===
Proposition B would authorize the city to issue $195 million in bonds to fund repairs and improvements in parks and public open spaces. This measure required a two-thirds majority to pass.

Proposition B
| Choice | Votes | % |
|---|---|---|
| For | 242,404 | 72.11 |
| Against | 93,735 | 27.89 |
| Required majority | | 66.67 |
| Total | 336,139 | 100.00 |
| Valid votes | 336,139 | 93.61 |
| Invalid/blank votes | 22,935 | 6.39 |
| Total votes | 359,074 | 100.00 |
| Registered voters/turnout | | 71.41 |

=== Proposition C ===
Proposition C would establish a Housing Trust Fund to fund construction and maintenance of affordable housing, provide for loan assistance and foreclosure relief, and fund neighborhood improvements; reduce on-site affordable-housing requirements; and authorize the construction of 30,000 low-rental units in the city.

Proposition C
| Choice | Votes | % |
|---|---|---|
| For | 211,674 | 65.15 |
| Against | 113,214 | 34.85 |
| Total | 324,888 | 100.00 |
| Valid votes | 324,888 | 90.48 |
| Invalid/blank votes | 34,186 | 9.52 |
| Total votes | 359,074 | 100.00 |
| Registered voters/turnout | | 71.41 |

=== Proposition D ===
Proposition D would shift the elections of City Attorney and Treasurer to the same year as those of the Mayor, District Attorney, and Assessor-Recorder.

Proposition D
| Choice | Votes | % |
|---|---|---|
| For | 263,642 | 83.20 |
| Against | 53,252 | 16.80 |
| Total | 316,894 | 100.00 |
| Valid votes | 316,894 | 88.25 |
| Invalid/blank votes | 42,180 | 11.75 |
| Total votes | 359,074 | 100.00 |
| Registered voters/turnout | | 71.41 |

=== Proposition E ===
Proposition E would phase in a gross receipts tax and phase out a payroll tax in a revenue-neutral manner and increase business registration fees.

Proposition E
| Choice | Votes | % |
|---|---|---|
| For | 223,887 | 70.75 |
| Against | 92,577 | 29.25 |
| Total | 316,464 | 100.00 |
| Valid votes | 316,464 | 88.13 |
| Invalid/blank votes | 42,610 | 11.87 |
| Total votes | 359,074 | 100.00 |
| Registered voters/turnout | | 71.41 |

=== Proposition F ===
Proposition F would require the city to study the draining of Hetch Hetchy Reservoir and the identifying of replacement water and power sources.

Proposition F
| Choice | Votes | % |
|---|---|---|
| For | 74,885 | 23.10 |
| Against | 249,304 | 76.90 |
| Total | 324,189 | 100.00 |
| Valid votes | 324,189 | 90.28 |
| Invalid/blank votes | 34,885 | 9.72 |
| Total votes | 359,074 | 100.00 |
| Registered voters/turnout | | 71.41 |

=== Proposition G ===
Proposition G would make it City policy to oppose corporate personhood and that corporations are subject to political spending limits.

Proposition G
| Choice | Votes | % |
|---|---|---|
| For | 260,595 | 80.99 |
| Against | 61,181 | 19.01 |
| Total | 321,776 | 100.00 |
| Valid votes | 321,776 | 89.61 |
| Invalid/blank votes | 37,298 | 10.39 |
| Total votes | 359,074 | 100.00 |
| Registered voters/turnout | | 71.41 |
