= 2012 Anchorage mayoral election =

- April 3, 2012
- Turnout: 35.09%
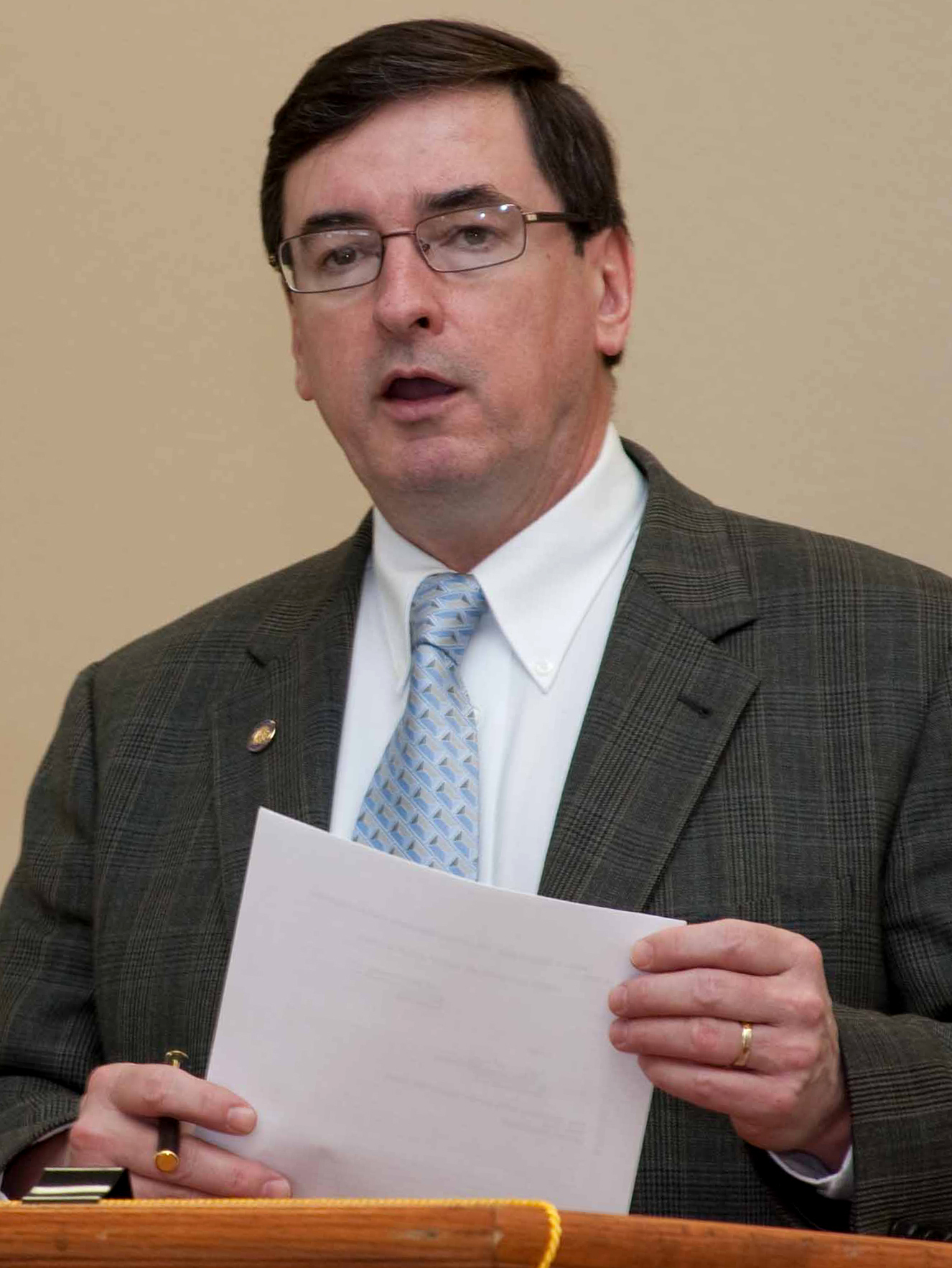

Candidate	Dan Sullivan	Paul Honeman
Popular vote	40,871	26,896
Percentage	58.68%	38.61%
Results by precinct:
Sullivan:
40–50%
50–60%
60–70%
70–80%
80–90%
Tie:
40-50%
Honeman:
40–50%
50–60%
60–70%
Mayor before election
Dan Sullivan
Republican
Elected mayor
Dan Sullivan
Republican

The 2012 Anchorage mayoral election was held on April 20, 2012, to elect the mayor of Anchorage, Alaska. It saw reelection of incumbent mayor Dan Sullivan.

Since Sullivan obtained a 45% plurality in the initial round, no runoff was necessitated.

== Results ==
Results
Party	Candidate	Votes	%
Nonpartisan	Dan Sullivan (incumbent)	40,871	58.68
Nonpartisan	Paul Honeman	26,896	38.61
Nonpartisan	Jacob Seth Kern	473	0.68
Nonpartisan	Bruce J. Lemke	348	0.50
Nonpartisan	Phil Isley	333	0.48
Nonpartisan	Bob Lupo	323	0.46
Write-in	Write-ins	411	0.59
Turnout		69,655	35.09
