= 2012 Los Angeles County Board of Supervisors election =

2012 Los Angeles County Board of Supervisors elections

3 of the 5 seats of the Los Angeles County Board of Supervisors
	Majority party	Minority party
Party	Democratic	Republican
Seats before	3	2
Seats won	1	2
Seats after	3	2
Seat change	Steady	Steady
- Results of the elections: Democratic hold Republican hold No election

The 2012 Los Angeles County Board of Supervisors elections were held on June 5, 2012, coinciding with the Presidential primary elections, June 2012. Three of the five seats (for the Second, Fourth and Fifth Districts) of the Los Angeles County Board of Supervisors were contested in this election. None of the incumbents were termed out.

== Results ==
=== Second District ===
2012 Los Angeles County Board of Supervisors election District 2

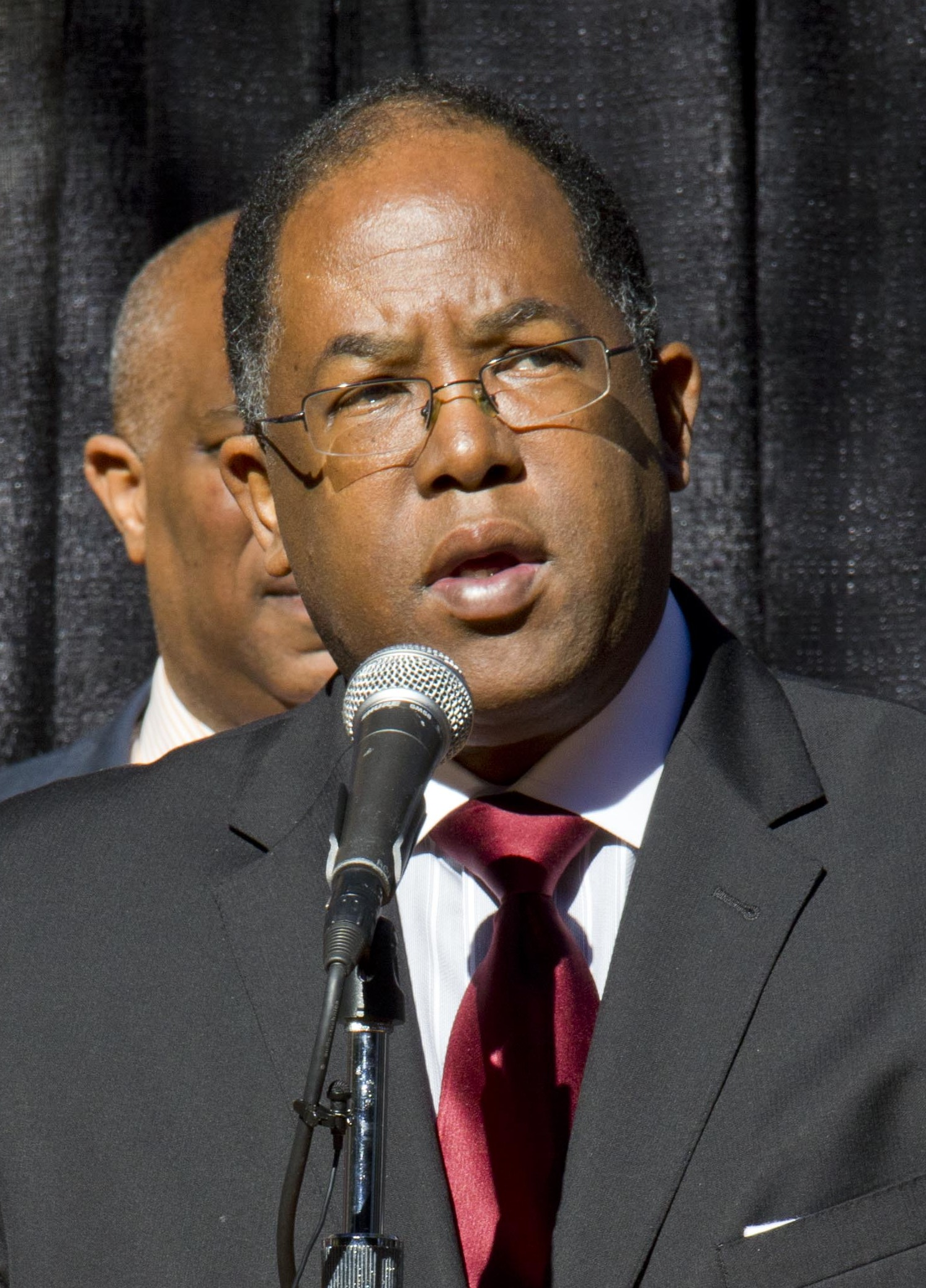
Candidate	Mark Ridley-Thomas
Popular vote	96,943
Percentage	100.00%
Supervisor before election
Mark Ridley-Thomas
Supervisor
Mark Ridley-Thomas

The incumbent, Mark Ridley-Thomas, ran unopposed.

2nd District supervisorial election, 2012
Candidate	Votes	%
Mark Ridley-Thomas (incumbent)	96,943	100.00
Turnout	{{{votes}}}	11.78%
Total votes	96,943	100.00

=== Fourth District ===
2012 Los Angeles County Board of Supervisors election District 4

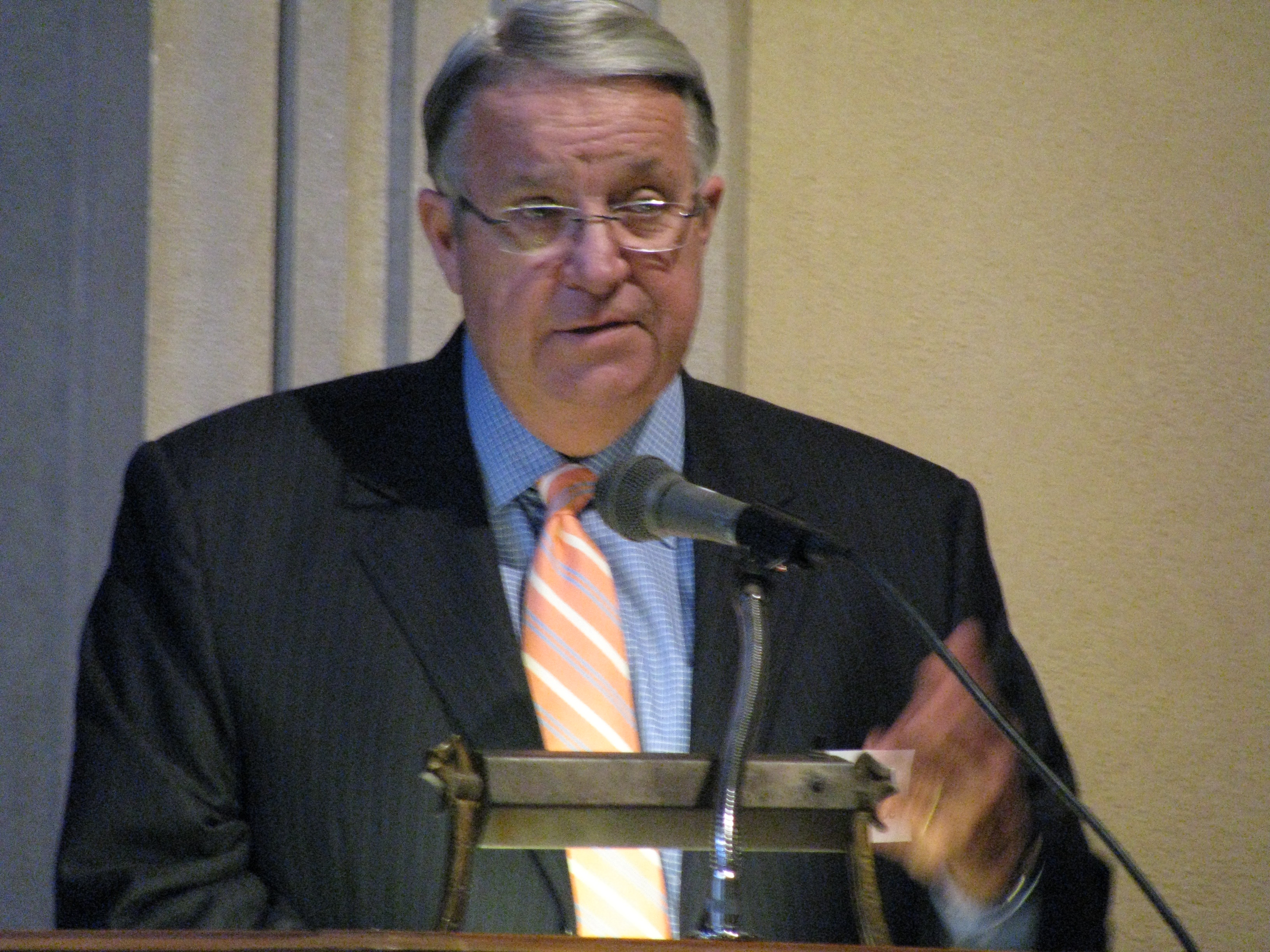
Candidate	Don Knabe
Popular vote	137,176
Percentage	100.00%
Supervisor before election
Don Knabe
Supervisor
Don Knabe

The incumbent, Don Knabe, ran unopposed.

4th District supervisorial election, 2012
Candidate	Votes	%
Don Knabe (incumbent)	137,176	100.00
Turnout	{{{votes}}}	14.11%
Total votes	137,176	100.00

=== Fifth District ===
2012 Los Angeles County Board of Supervisors election District 5

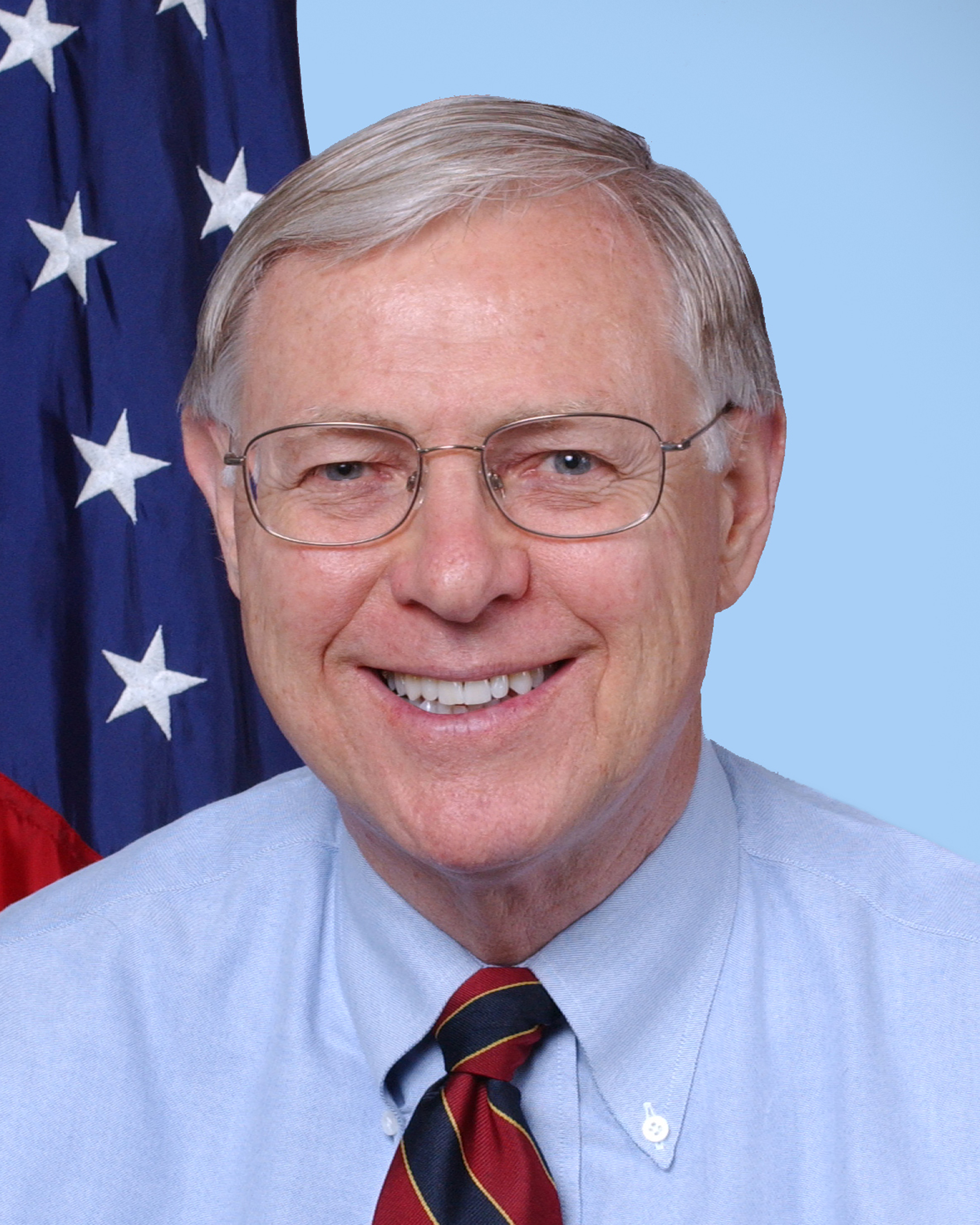
Candidate	Michael D. Antonovich	Raj Pal Kahlon
Popular vote	163,343	41,983
Percentage	79.55%	20.45%
Supervisor before election
Michael D. Antonovich
Supervisor
Michael D. Antonovich

5th District supervisorial election, 2012
Candidate	Votes	%
Michael D. Antonovich (incumbent)	163,343	79.55
Raj Pal Kahlon	41,983	20.45
Turnout	{{{votes}}}	21.16%
Total votes	205,326	100.00
