= Wukan =

Wukan 乌坎村
- Village
- Location in Guangdong
- Coordinates: 22°53′18″N 115°40′13″E
- Country: People's Republic of China
- Province: Guangdong
- Prefecture-level city: Shanwei
- County level city: Lufeng
- Subdistrict: Donghai

Wukan
- Simplified Chinese: 乌坎村
- Traditional Chinese: 烏坎村
- Literal meaning: Black Ridge Village
Transcriptions
Standard Mandarin
- Hanyu Pinyin: Wūkǎn cūn
Yue: Cantonese
- Jyutping: Wu1 ham2

Wukan (Chinese: 乌坎村; pinyin: Wūkǎn Cūn) is a coastal fishing village in Donghai Subdistrict (东海街道), in the county-level city of Lufeng, Guangdong. It has a population of approximately 13,000 residents, and is located approximately 120 km (75 mi) east of Hong Kong near the South China Sea coast.

Wukan became internationally notable as the site of the 2011 Wukan protests that resulted in the ousting of local government officials over allegations of corruption, the appointment of village leaders to positions within the local Chinese Communist Party committee, and the holding of democratic elections to elect the new village chief and village council.

== See also ==
- List of villages in China
- Lufeng
- Protest and dissent in China
- Wukan protests
