= June 2012 San Francisco general election =

The June 2012 San Francisco general elections were held on June 5, 2012, in San Francisco, California. The elections included seats of various parties' county central committees and two San Francisco ballot measures.

== Propositions ==
Note: "City" refers to the San Francisco municipal government.

=== Proposition A ===

Proposition A would change the permit system for awarding garbage disposal and recycling contracts to a competitive bidding process, prohibit a company from providing both garbage disposal and recycling services, require that the City own all recycling and garbage disposal facilities, and require the San Francisco Board of Supervisors to set garbage disposal rates.

Proposition A
Choice	Votes	%
For	32,697	23.43
Against	106,848	76.57
Total	139,545	100.00
Valid votes	139,545	96.17
Invalid/blank votes	5,560	3.83
Total votes	145,105	100.00
Registered voters/turnout		30.83

=== Proposition B ===

Proposition B would make it City policy to limit commercial and private events at Coit Tower and use revenues from its concessions for maintaining the tower and surrounding Pioneer Park.

Proposition B
Choice	Votes	%
For	72,672	53.43
Against	63,336	46.57
Total	136,008	100.00
Valid votes	136,008	93.73
Invalid/blank votes	9,097	6.27
Total votes	145,105	100.00
Registered voters/turnout		30.83
