= 2012 Portland, Oregon, City Commission election =

The 2012 Portland City Commission elections were held on May 15, 2012, and November 6, 2012. Steve Novick won position 4 outright by receiving over 50% of the vote and avoided a runoff. Amanda Fritz won election to position 1 during the runoff election.

== Position 1 ==
2012 Portland City Commission election, Position 1
- May 15, 2023 (first round); November 6, 2023 (runoff)
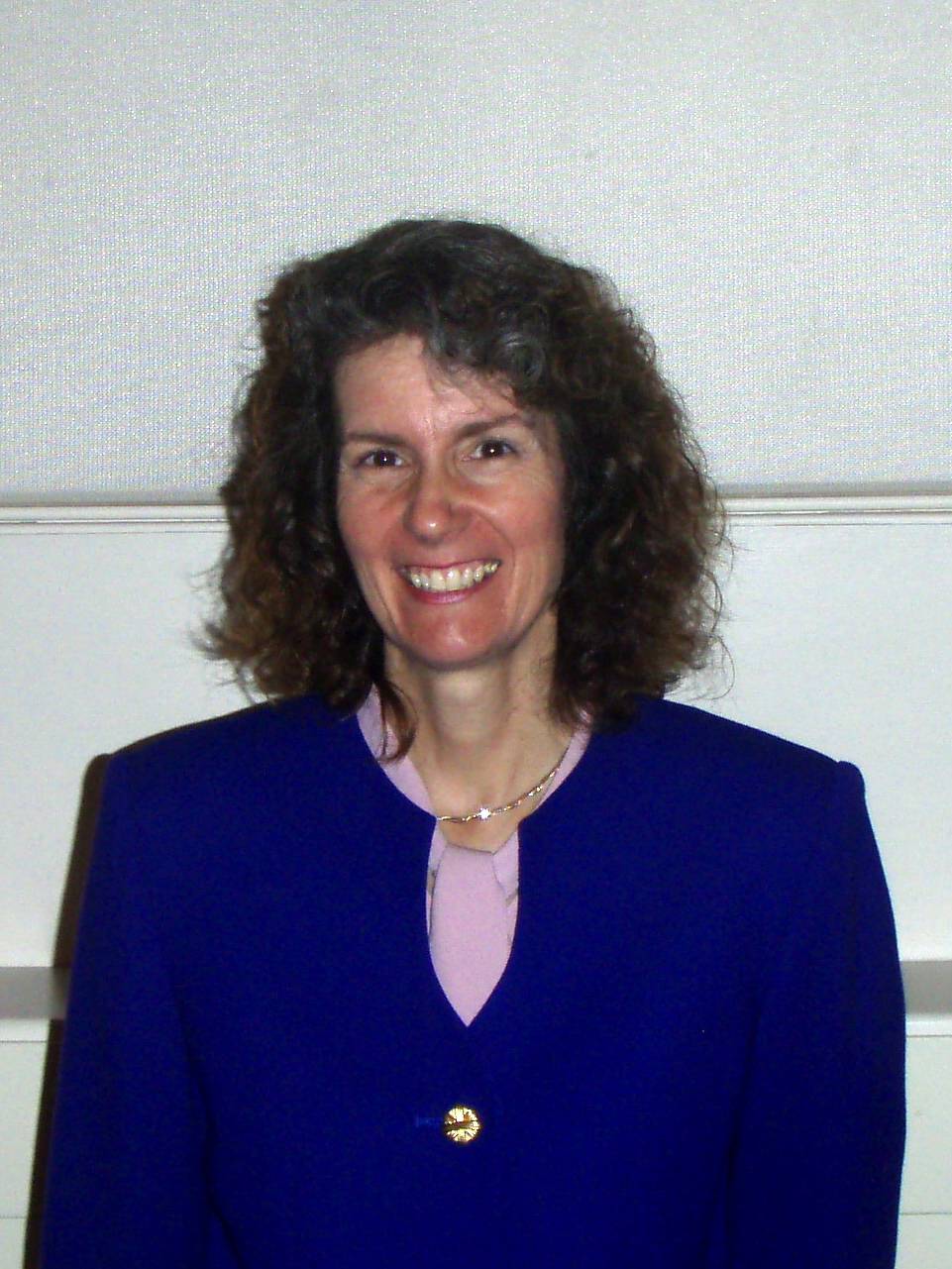

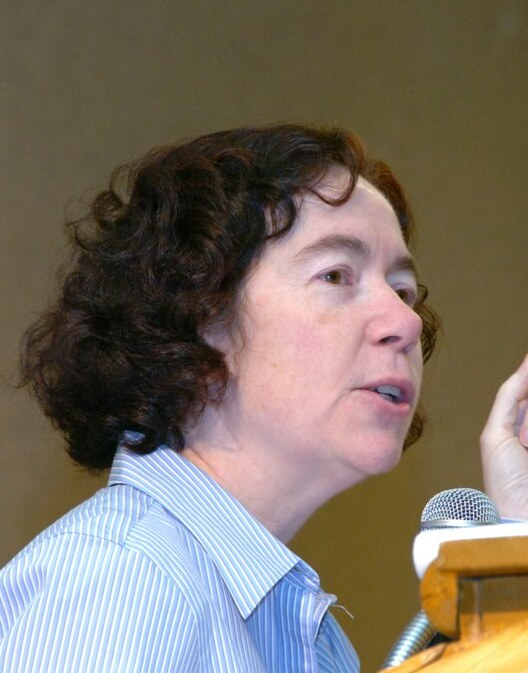

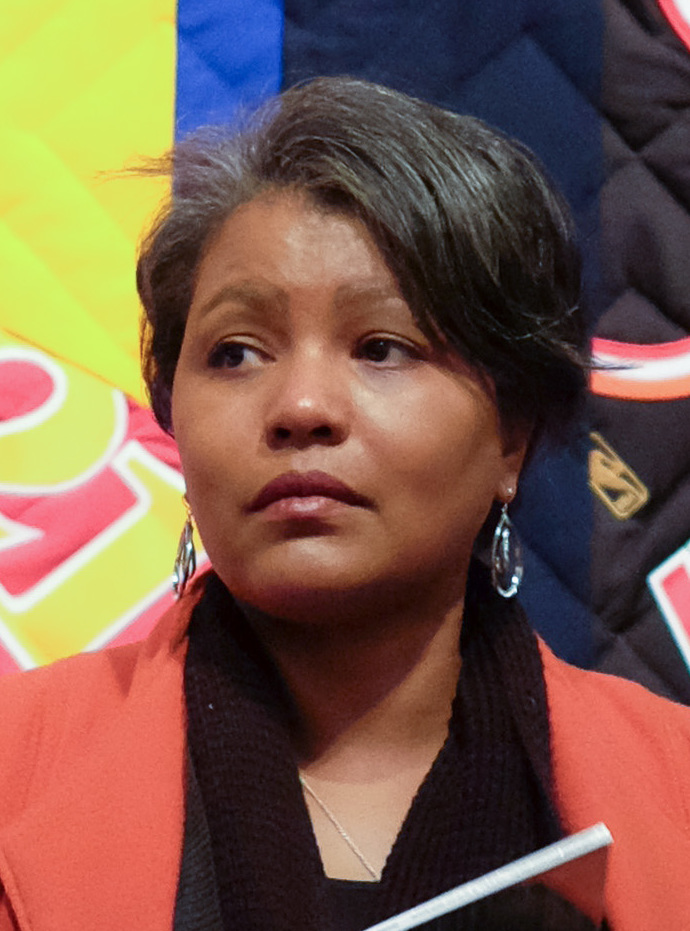

Candidate	Amanda Fritz	Mary Nolan	Bruce Altizer
First round	54,323; 45.40%	52,823; 44.15%	5,511; 4.61%
Runoff	139,997; 59.23%	93,994; 39.77%	Eliminated
Candidate	Teressa L. Raiford	David G Gwyther
First round	3,840; 3.21%	2,725; 2.28%
Runoff	Eliminated	Eliminated
Commissioner before election
Amanda Fritz
Nonpartisan
Elected Commissioner
Amanda Fritz
Nonpartisan

Incumbent Amanda Fritz barely won the primary election with 45.40%. Because she did not receive over 50% of the votes, she proceeded to a runoff election with runner-up Mary Nolan. Fritz won the runoff with 59.23% to Nolan's 39.77%

Position 1 primary election, 2012
Party	Candidate	Votes	%
Nonpartisan	Amanda Fritz	54,323	45.40%
Nonpartisan	Mary Nolan	52,823	44.15%
Nonpartisan	Bruce Altizer	5,511	4.61%
Nonpartisan	Teressa L. Raiford	3,840	3.21%
Nonpartisan	David G. Gwyther	2,725	2.28%
Write-in		427	0.36%
Total votes		119,649	100%

Position 1 runoff Election, 2012
Party	Candidate	Votes	%
Nonpartisan	Amanda Fritz	139,997	59.23%
Nonpartisan	Mary Nolan	93,994	39.77%
	write-ins	2,366	1%
Total votes		236,357	100%

== Position 4 ==
2012 Portland City Commission election, Position 4
- May 15, 2012
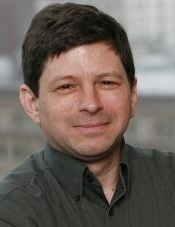

Candidate	Steve Novick	Scott McAlpine
Party	Nonpartisan	Nonpartisan
Popular vote	85,536	8,851
Percentage	75.59%	7.82%
City Commission before election
Randy Leonard
Nonpartisan
Elected City Commission
Steve Novick
Nonpartisan

Attorney and former (unsuccessful) 2008 US Senate candidate Steve Novick won election outright with 75.59% of the vote, avoiding a runoff by receiving over 50% of the vote in the primaries.

Position 4 election, 2012
Party	Candidate	Votes	%
Nonpartisan	Steve Novick	85,536	75.59%
Nonpartisan	Scott McAlpine	8,951	7.82%
Nonpartisan	Jeri Williams	5,608	4.96%
Nonpartisan	Leah Marie Dumas	4,879	4.31%
Nonpartisan	Mark White	4,255	3.76%
Nonpartisan	Brian Sidney Parrott	2,341	2.07%
Nonpartisan	James Rowell	1,180	1.04%
Write-in		501	0.44%
Total votes		113,151	100

== See also ==
- 2012 Portland, Oregon, mayoral election
