= 2012 Sacramento mayoral election =

Sacramento mayoral election, 2012
- June 5, 2012
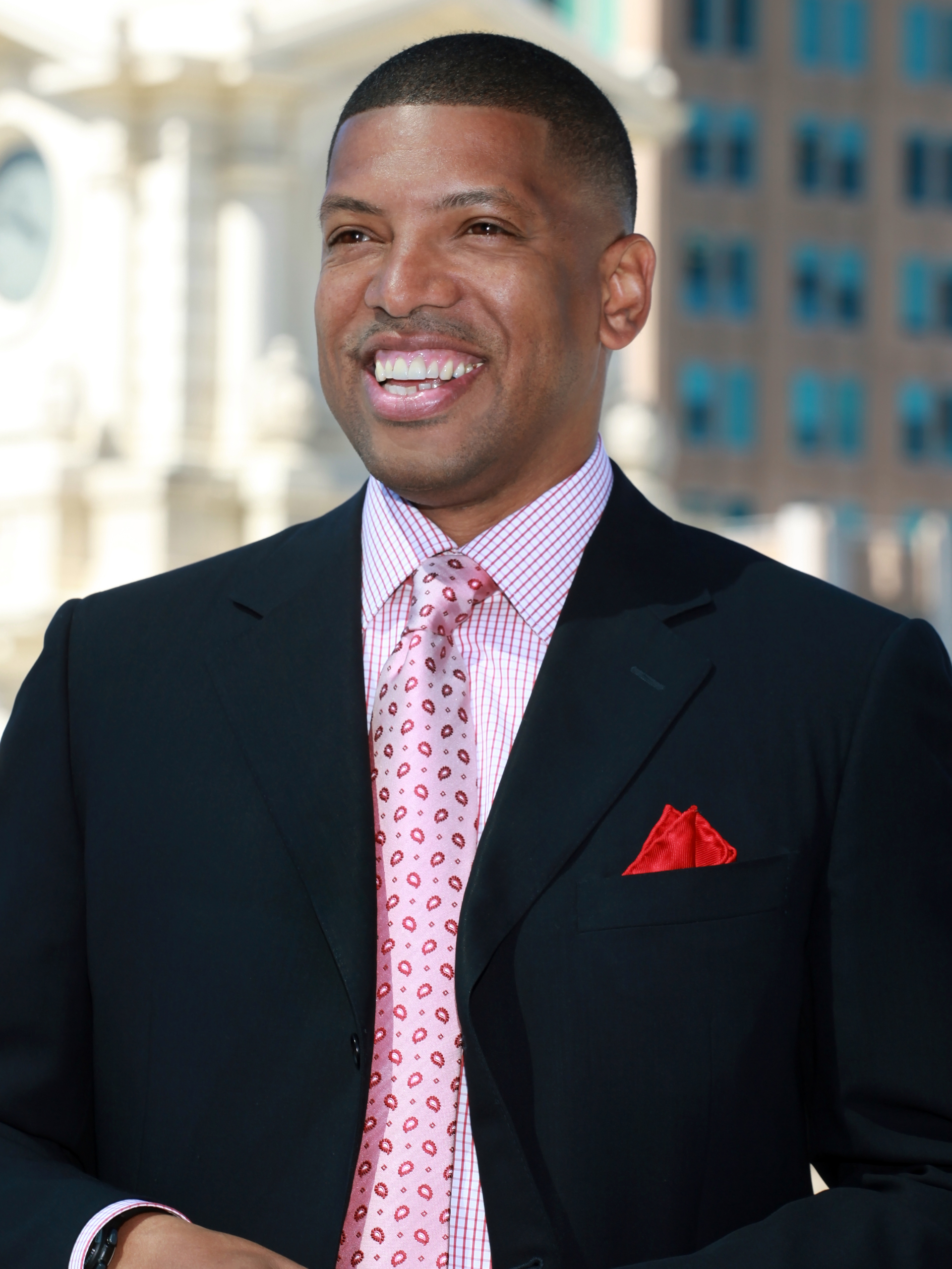

Candidate	Kevin Johnson	Jonathan Michael Rewers	J. Leonard Padilla
Popular vote	40,823	16,551	8,989
Percentage	58%	23%	12%
Mayor before election
Kevin Johnson
Democratic
Elected mayor
Kevin Johnson

The 2012 Sacramento mayoral election was held on June 5, 2012, to elect the mayor of Sacramento, California. It saw the reelection of Kevin Johnson. Since Johnson won a majority in the first round, no runoff was required.

Municipal elections in California are officially non-partisan.

== Results ==
Sacramento mayoral election, 2012
Candidate	Votes	%
Kevin Johnson (incumbent)	40,823	58
Jonathan Michael Rewers	16,551	23
J. Leonard Padilla	9,519	12
Richard Jones	2,670	3
Edgar Hilbert-Rodriguez (write-in)	105	0
Other write-ins	354	0
Total votes	74,438	
