= Dongsha (disambiguation) =

Dongsha (Chinese: t 東沙, p Dōngshā, lit. "Eastern Sands") is pinyin transliteration of the Mandarin Chinese name for Pratas Island, as well as the Chinese name for the group of three atolls in Cijin District, Kaohsiung, Taiwan (ROC).

Dongsha may also refer to:

- Dongsha (Yangtze), one of the shoals which formed modern Chongming in northern Shanghai
- Dongsha Airport
- Dongsha Atoll National Park
