= Pratas Island =

Island in the northern South China Sea

Disputed island Native name: 東沙島
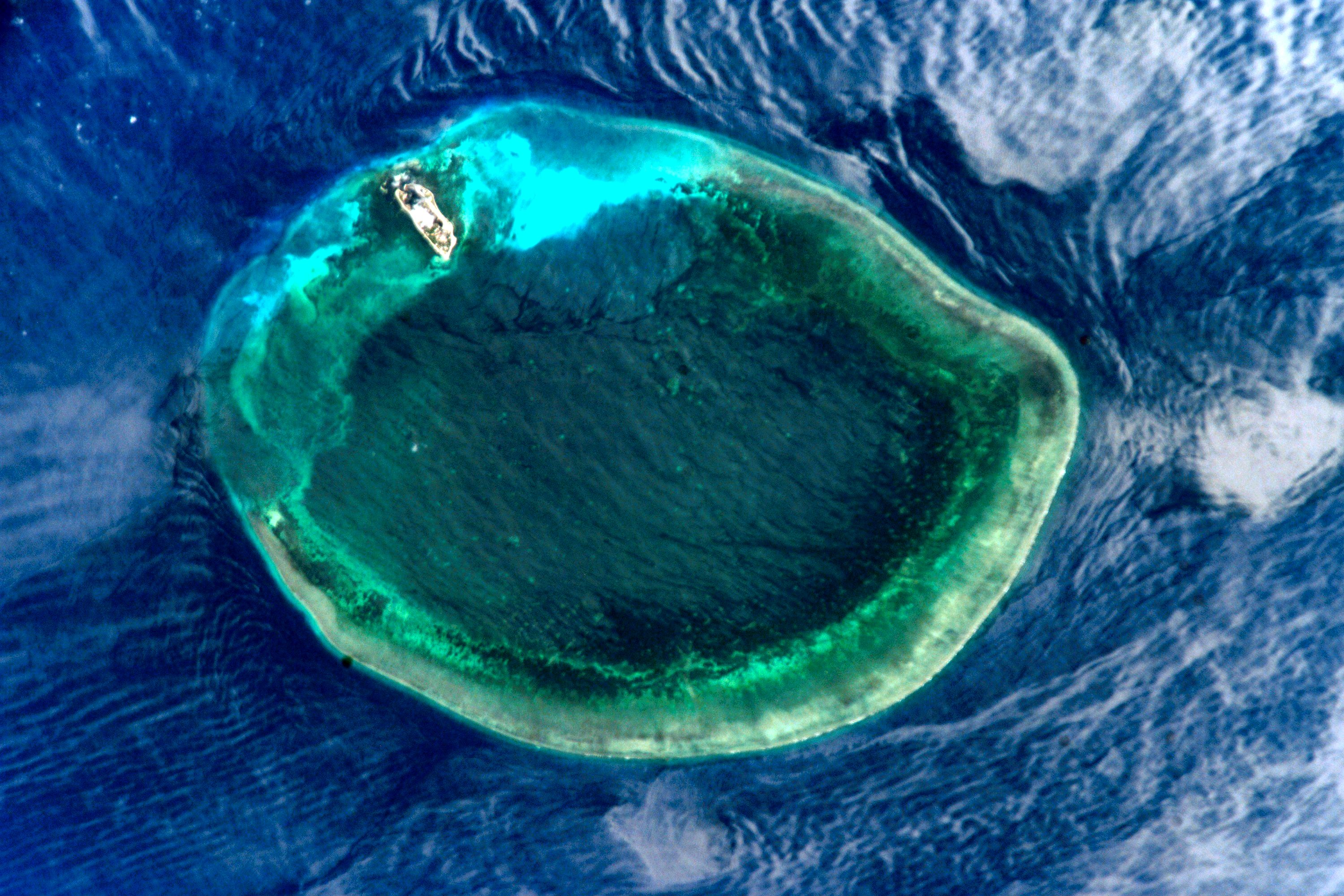
- Pratas Atoll from space, January 1986.

- Location of Pratas Island, Taiping Island; Legend： Pratas Island Taiping Island Kaohsiung
- Other names: Tungsha Island; Dongsha Island

Geography
- Location: South China Sea
- Coordinates: 20°42′08″N 116°43′39″E
- Total islands: 1
- Area: 174 ha (430 acres) (land), 64 ha (158.15 acres) (lagoon)
- Length: 2.8 km (1.74 mi)
- Width: 0.865 km (0.5375 mi)

Administration
- Taiwan
- Municipality District: Kaohsiung; Cijin

Claimed by
- China
- Province Prefecture-level city District: Guangdong; Shanwei Chengqu

Pratas Island, also known as the Tungsha Islands or the Dongsha Islands (Chinese: 東沙群島; pinyin: Dōngshā Qúndǎo; Pe̍h-ōe-jī: Tang-soa Kûn-tó; lit. 'East Sand Islands'), is a coral island situated in the northern part of the South China Sea administered as part of Cijin District, Kaohsiung, Taiwan. It is located about 170 nautical miles (310 km; 200 mi) southeast of Hong Kong. It has an area of about 240 hectares (590 acres), including 64 hectares (160 acres) of lagoon, and is the largest of the South China Sea Islands. It is the location of the Dongsha Airport.

There are three undersea features in the waters associated with Pratas Island: Pratas Atoll, North Vereker Bank and South Vereker Bank. The atoll is circular, and the crescent-shaped Pratas Island occupies its western part. Below the ocean's surface to the northwest (21°N 116°E) of Pratas Island, North Vereker Bank rises to 11 metres (36 ft) below sea level and South Vereker Bank to 58 metres (190 ft) below sea level.

There are numerous oil wells to the west of the banks. In 2007, the Dongsha Atoll National Park was established on the island. The People's Republic of China claims the island, atoll and banks as part of Guangdong Province.

== Pratas Islands ==
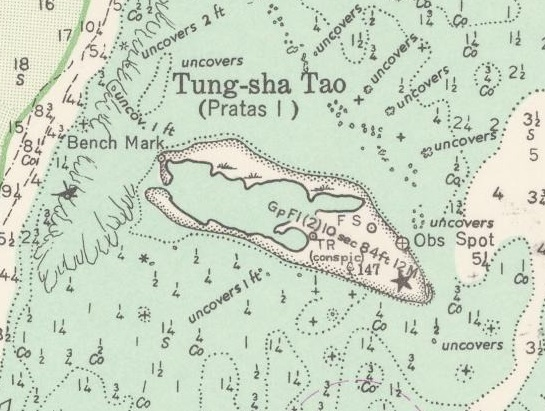
Map of Pratas Island (NAVOCEANO, 1969)

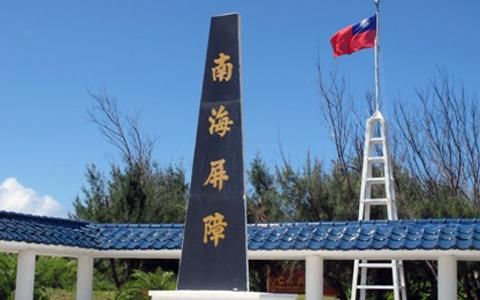
Stele erected on Pratas Island by the ROC Ministry of the Interior (Translation: Barrier of the South China Sea)

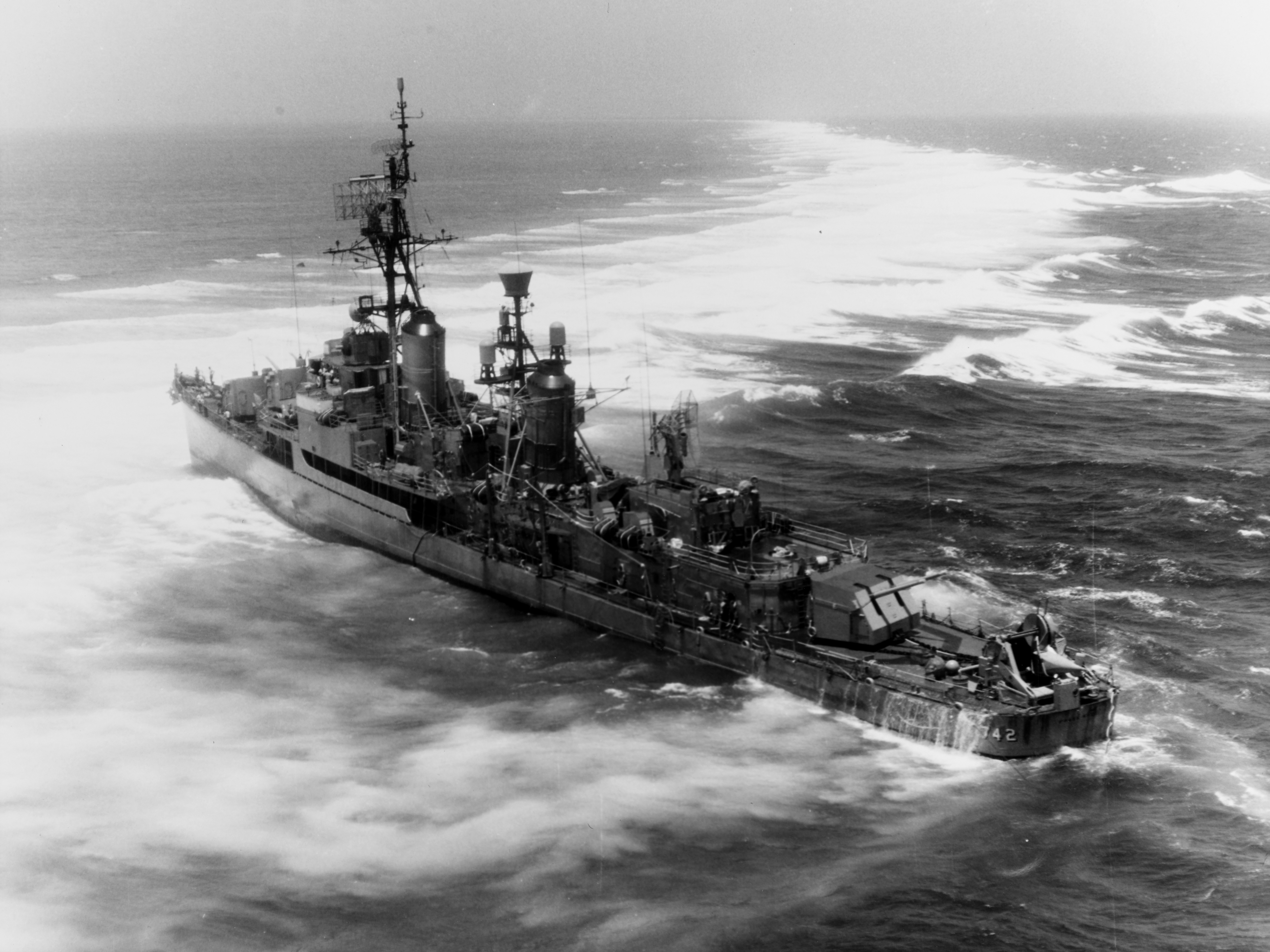
USS Frank Knox aground on Pratas Reef 1965

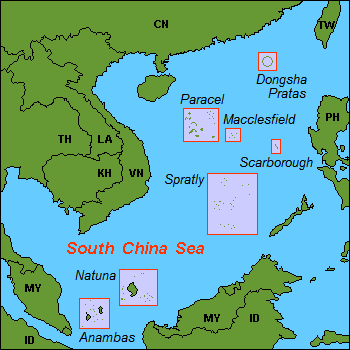
South China Sea

The English name of the island derives from the Portuguese Ilhas das Pratas ("Silver Plate Islands"), which was given to the atoll in the 16th century owing to its round shape. Pratas Atoll is also called Pratas Reef.

Tungsha Island (Tung-sha Tao) (Chinese: 東沙島; pinyin: Dōngshā Dǎo; Wade–Giles: Tung^{1}-sha^{1} Tao^{3}; Pe̍h-ōe-jī: Tang-soa-tó) is the Wade–Giles-derived romanization of the Mandarin Chinese name for the island, and Dongsha Island (Dongsha Dao) is the pinyin-derived name. A smaller island with the same Chinese character name is located in the Taiwan-administered Dongyin Township in the Matsu Islands in the East China Sea.

The area including the island, atoll and banks is also called the Pratas Islands (Chinese: 東沙群島; pinyin: Dōngshā Qúndǎo; Pe̍h-ōe-jī: Tang-soa Kûn-tó; lit. 'East Sand Islands'), the Tungsha Islands and the Dongsha Islands. Despite these names, Pratas Island is the only island; there is no group of islands. Yoshiyuki Ogasawara in The Diplomat described the other entities as "essentially rocks".

On May 29, 1945, the American submarine USS Bluegill occupied the island after shelling Japanese positions there in January, raising an American flag, claiming it for the United States, and proclaiming it Bluegill Island. Giving the island a new name, and claiming it for the U.S., was done independently by the Submarine's commander without support from the United States government, although the landing was acknowledged by the Commander, Submarine Force, U.S. Pacific Fleet Merrill Comstock in his report to the Pentagon. The U.S. government took no effort to further pursue this and never formally claimed the island.

== History ==
The East Indiaman Earl Talbot was wrecked on Pratas Island on or about 22 October 1800 with the loss of all aboard. At the time the island was known to British sailors as "Perates". In 1851, the British screw sloop HMS Reynard wrecked on the south-east bend of Pratas Atoll while going to the aid of another wrecked vessel; the crew were all saved. Decades later, the boilers and parts of the machinery of the wreckage of HMS Reynard remained visible on the atoll.

In 1859–1861, there was a correspondence between the British Colonial Office and the Hong Kong colonial authorities about building a lighthouse on the main island on the atoll. Despite an offer by a British businessman in Xiamen (Amoy) to build it, it was decided that the cost was too great and the matter lapsed. It is clear from the correspondence that no one supposed the atoll to be a part of any known jurisdiction, so negotiations might have been required to ensure that any construction would be legal.

One consequence of that initiative was that, in 1858, the Royal Navy survey ship HMS Saracen completed the first detailed survey of the atoll, resulting in the Plan of the Pratas Reef and Island, J. Richards and others, April 1858, being published by the British Admiralty. On the resulting chart three positions are proposed for a lighthouse: on Pratas Island, on the north-east corner, or on the southern edge near where HMS Reynard had stranded. In the north-east corner of the lagoon the chart notes "Anchorage for junks", indicating regular use by fishing and other small vessels taking shelter. The chart's rubric noted that the available safe draft for vessels entering was only 15 feet (4.6 m), so it was restricted to relatively small vessels only.

In 1866, naturalist Cuthbert Collingwood visited Pratas Island and later published a description of it.

In 1908–1909, a Japanese businessman named Nishizawa Yoshizi (西澤吉次) established a guano collecting station. He destroyed the Dawang Joss House (大王廟), dug up graves and poured the bone ashes of Chinese fishermen into the sea, and renamed the atoll "Nishizawa Island". After a diplomatic confrontation, Chinese sovereignty was re-established, and Nishizawa withdrew, after being compensated by the Guangdong provincial government, and after paying compensation for the destruction of a Chinese fishermen's shrine.

In December 1930, the schooner Hedwig (Sweden) ran aground on a coral reef off Pratas Island and was wrecked.

On 22 May 1944, the Japanese gunboat Hashidate was torpedoed and sunk by the US submarine USS Picuda, in the South China Sea off Pratas Island at 21°08′N 117°20′E, while towing the disabled passenger-cargo ship Tsukuba Maru. Casualties are unknown but her commanding officer was killed.

Japanese naval personnel occupied Pratas Island during World War II. The Japanese Navy used the island as a weather station and listening post. On May 29, 1945, at 10:22 AM, a landing party consisting of Australian commandos and US naval personnel from the submarine USS Bluegill raised the US flag, declared the island a United States territory, and named it Bluegill Island. The landing party destroyed a radio tower, weather station, fuel and ammunition dumps, and several buildings. They encountered no resistance because the Japanese had left the island prior to the arrival of Bluegill.

Pratas Island was later restored to Guangdong Province of the Republic of China (ROC). On September 12, 1946, the navy of the Republic of China took over and garrisoned Pratas Island.

On 6 June 1949, the ROC established the Hainan Special Administrative District (海南特別行政區), which included Pratas Island.

In autumn 1954, the senior ROC politician Chiang Ching-kuo visited the island and made an inspection.

On 9 June 1960, during Typhoon Mary, the Hong Kong cargo ship Shun Lee was driven against Pratas Reef and wrecked. Her 55 crew took to the liferafts and were rescued by the USS Yorktown (CV-10).

While underway in the South China Sea on 18 July 1965, the USS Frank Knox ran aground on Pratas Reef, and was only freed on 24 August after a very difficult salvage effort.

On 13 April 1996, the jurisdiction of the Taiwan Kaohsiung District Court was extended to include Tungsha Island (Pratas Island).

In May 1999, Kaohsiung Mayor Frank Hsieh visited the island and hung an address plate on the island's fishing service station. On 21 December 2000, ROC President Chen Shui-bian visited the island with Kaohsiung Mayor Frank Hsieh. On 28 July 2005, President Chen Shui-bian again visited the island and inaugurated the Fifth Maritime Patrol Squad of the Coast Guard Administration.

In January 2007, the ROC government designated the Pratas atoll as the Dongsha Atoll National Park, the first marine national park in Taiwan.

On 8 January 2013, an office of Chunghwa Post was established on Pratas Island.

In September 2020, the PRC conducted air drills over the waters between the main island of Taiwan and Pratas Island that intruded into the ROC air defense identification zone (ADIZ). The planes were issued radio warnings by the ROC military until they left.

On 15 October 2020, a regular civilian charter flight by Uni Air had to abandon its trip from the main island of Taiwan to Pratas Island when Hong Kong air traffic controllers told the captain of the aircraft that there were "dangerous activities" happening below 26,000 ft (7,900 m) and that the Uni Air aircraft could not enter the Hong Kong Flight Information Region (FIR). The transcript of the conversation between the pilot and air traffic control was released by the ROC Civil Aeronautics Administration. The next day, the ROC Minister of National Defense Yen Teh-fa called on PRC not to "disrupt the order of international aviation". On 20 October, Deputy Chief of the ROC General Staff, Lieutenant-General Li Ting-sheng (李廷盛), visited Pratas Island. He made an inspection of the living facilities of the military personnel and gave them instructions. On 26 October, the same Uni Air aircraft made the round trip flight between the main island of Taiwan and Pratas Island.

On 27 October 2020, a Y8 PRC military aircraft entered ROC air defense identification zone (ADIZ) between the main island of Taiwan and Pratas Island for the twenty-first time that month. On 28 October, Zhu Fenglian of the Taiwan Affairs Office of the PRC was asked whether, in light of PLA military exercises in Fujian and Guangdong, there was or was not a plan to take Pratas Island from the ROC. Feng responded that she did not have to answer hypothetical questions. On 2 November, eight Chinese PLAAF aircraft breached the ROC ADIZ above an area of sea near Pratas Island. On 3 November, Y-8 plane entered the ADIZ of the ROC in the area between the main island of Taiwan and Pratas Island. On 4 November, the ROC Minister of National Defense, Yen Teh-fa, stated in a legislative hearing that since January 2020, 276 PRC military planes had entered the airspace between the main island of Taiwan and Pratas Island, activity that Yen associated with plans by the PRC for a creating its own ADIZ in the South China Sea. On 6 December, a PRC air force Y-8 plane entered the Taiwan ADIZ between the main island of Taiwan and Pratas Island, the fifth day in December that PRC military aircraft entered Taiwan's ADIZ.

== Geography ==
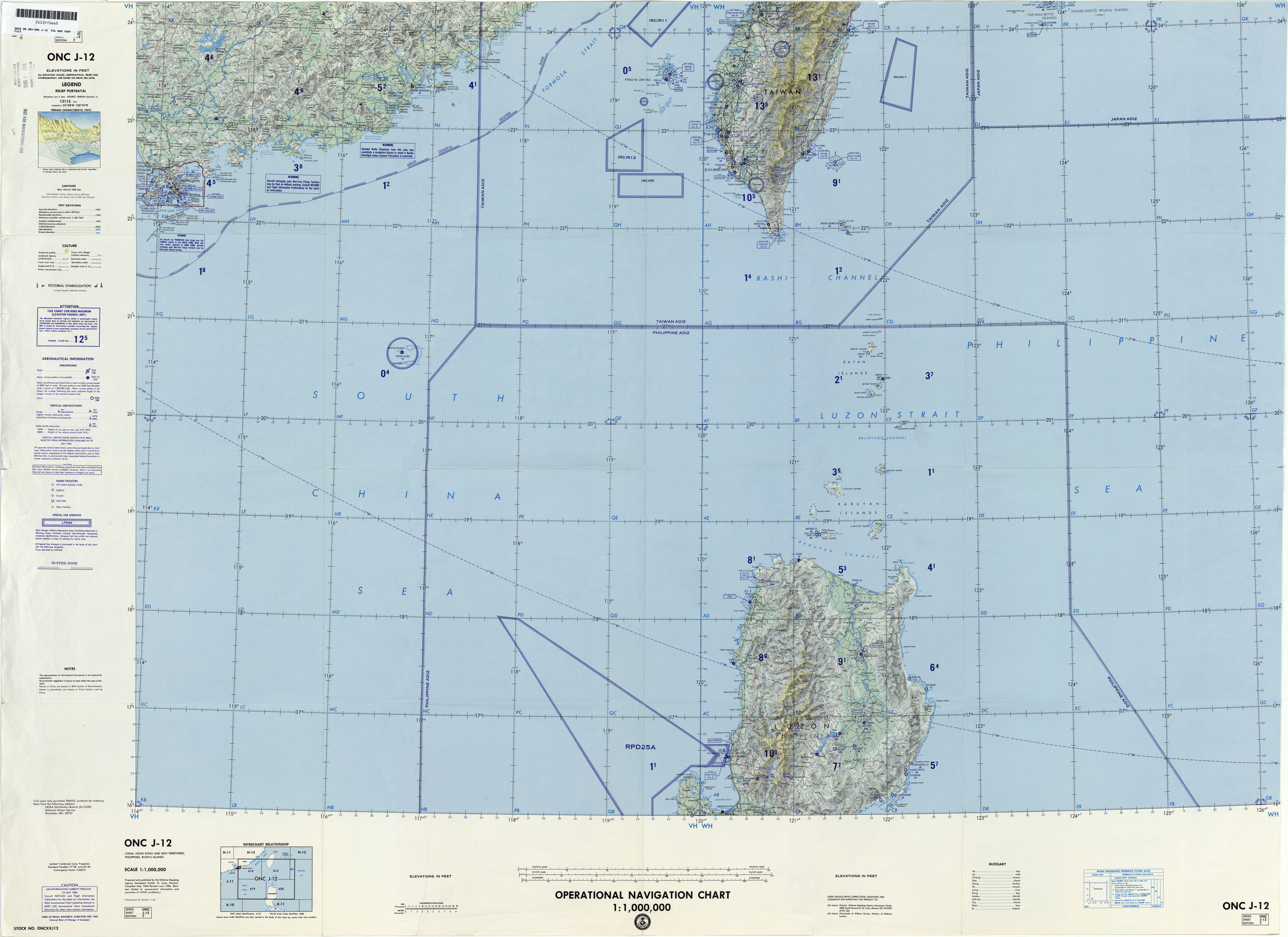
Map showing the location of Pratas Island (within (VH)R7) in the South China Sea (DMA, 1984)

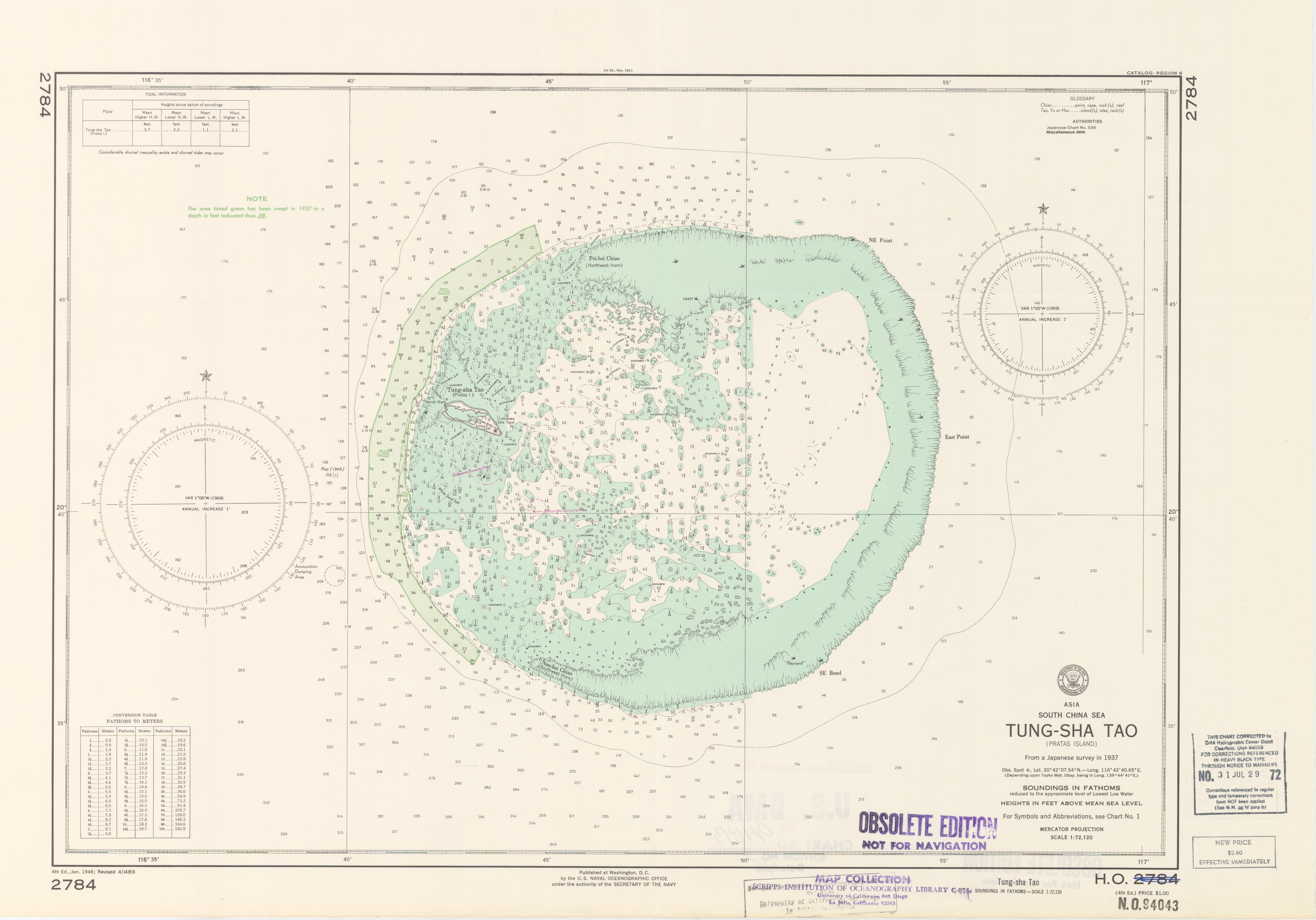
Map of Tung-sha Tao (Pratas Island) (NAVOCEANO, 1969)

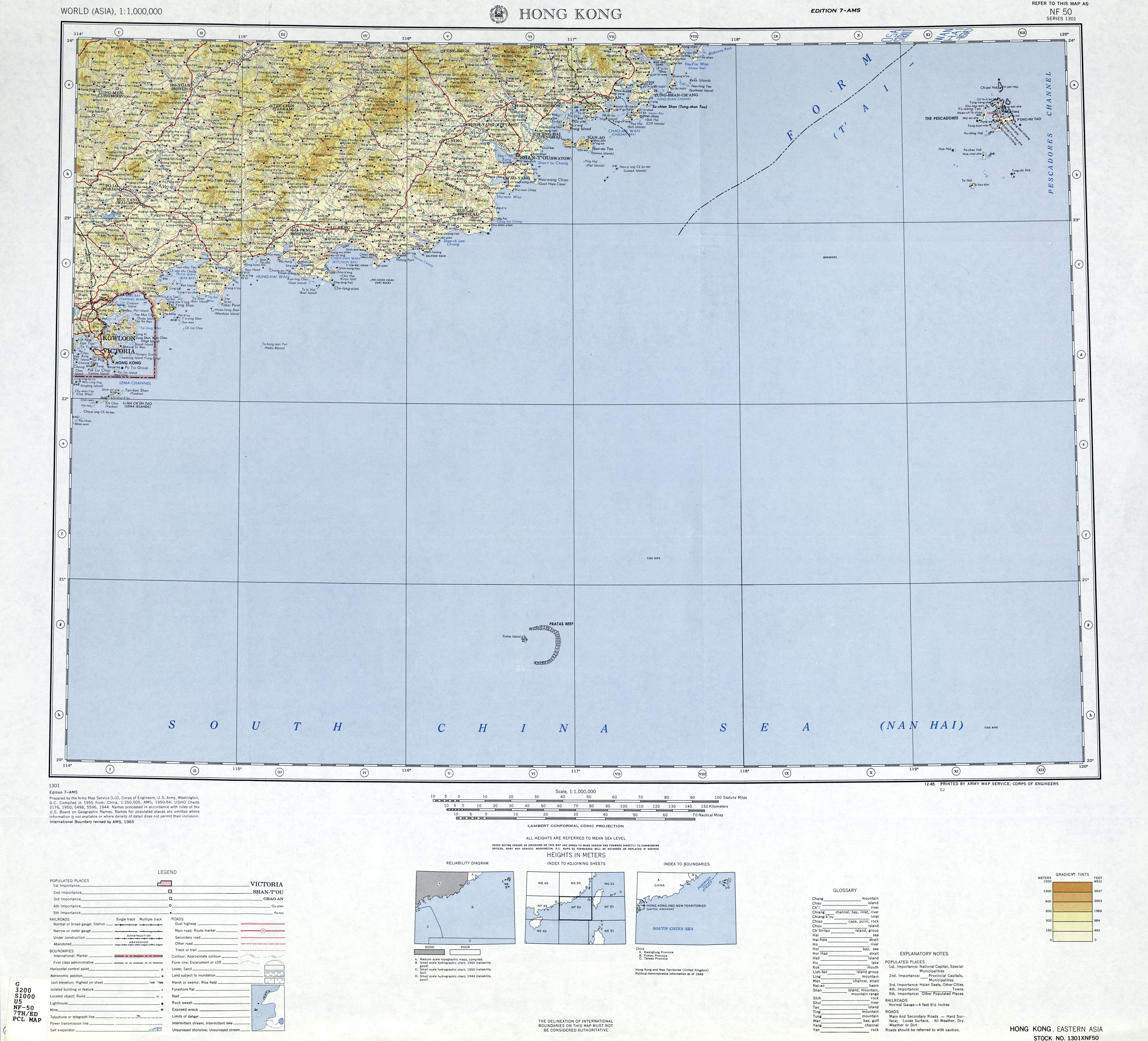
Map including Pratas Reef, Pratas Island and surrounding region from the International Map of the World (AMS, 1965)

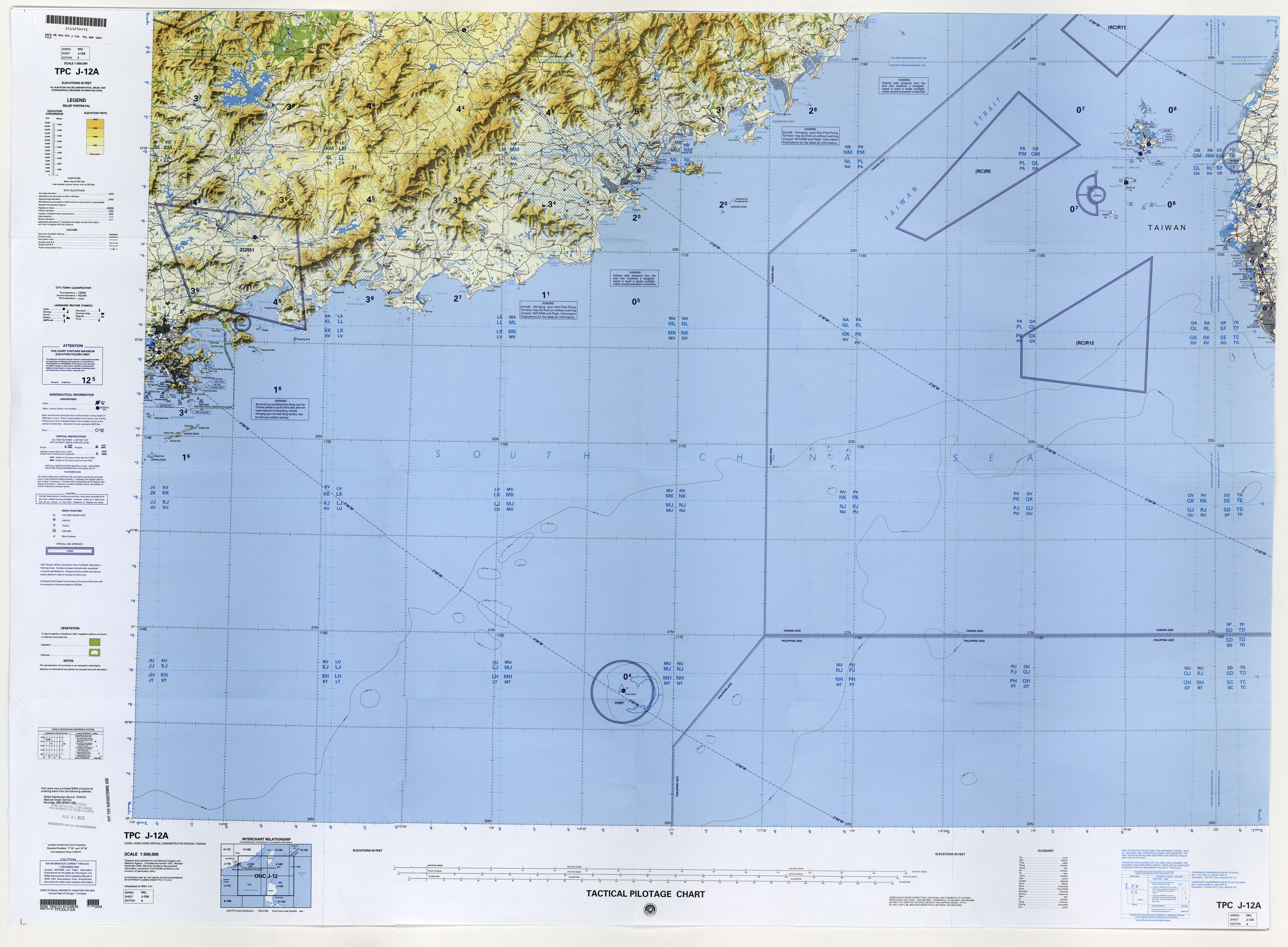
Map including Pratas Island (within VHR7) (NIMA, 2000)

Pratas Island is located 444 km (276 mi) from mainland Kaoshiung, 850 kilometres (530 miles) southwest of Taipei, 320 kilometres (200 miles) southeast of Hong Kong and 260 km (160 mi) south of Shantou, Guangdong in the northern part of the South China Sea (20°43′N 116°42′E). An international team of researchers conducted a comprehensive population genetic analysis of 11 marine species sampled from the island. They concluded that Dongsha Atoll is an important regional stepping-stone that promotes genetic connectivity among South China Sea reefs, as marine larvae can potentially reach a large number of reefs in the northern South China Sea. The protection of the island and surrounding reefs by the Taiwanese government as Dongsha Atoll National Park may therefore benefit the entire region.

Pratas Island is 2.8 km (1.7 mi) long and 0.865 km (0.537 mi) wide; it is the only feature of the group above sea level. The island is made up of coral atolls and reef flats. Brush, vines and bushes cover some of the island; the rest is white sand. Flora and fauna on and around Pratas Island include:

- Silver silk tree
- Tung tree
- Coconut tree
- Little terns
- Turnstones
- Gull-billed terns
- Parrotfish
- Starfish
- Rock lobsters

In the Journal of Science (April 1867) there is a nine-page article entitled "The Natural History of Pratas Island in the China Sea" by Dr. Cuthbert Collingwood, the naturalist on board HMS Serpent. It describes what was observed, especially bird life, during a visit of two days while the survey ship lay at anchor. Collingwood explored the island on 30 April 1866.

The Vereker Banks (21°N 116°E) are 74 km (46 mi) northwest of Pratas Atoll. North and South Vereker Banks are under water. North Vereker Bank (北衛灘) rises to 11 metres (36 ft) below sea level with an average depth of 60 metres (200 ft) to 90 metres (300 ft) below sea level. A well head with a depth of 4.1 metres (13 ft) lies 30 metres (98 ft) off North Vereker Bank. Two to three miles of deep water separate North Vereker Bank and South Vereker Bank. South Vereker Bank (南衛灘) rises to 58 metres (190 ft) below sea level. A well head, in a depth of over 100 metres (330 ft), lies 28 mi (45 km) north of the Vereker Banks at 21°38′N 116°03′E. The associated production platform and SPM make up Lu Feng Terminal; the terminal is enclosed by a restricted area. Exploration for oil is taking place in this area.

There are also some seamount formations nearby which are not part of the three atolls:

- Jianfeng Seamount (尖峰海山)
- Bijia Seamount (芼架海山)
- Beipo Seamount (北波海山)

== Climate ==
Climate data for Pratas Island
Month	Jan	Feb	Mar	Apr	May	Jun	Jul	Aug	Sep	Oct	Nov	Dec	Year
Mean daily maximum °C (°F)	23.1 (73.6)	23.7 (74.7)	27.6 (81.7)	28.7 (83.7)	31.1 (88.0)	31.8 (89.2)	31.7 (89.1)	31.3 (88.3)	30.6 (87.1)	27.8 (82.0)	26.3 (79.3)	23.7 (74.7)	28.1 (82.6)
Daily mean °C (°F)	20.8 (69.4)	21.2 (70.2)	23.8 (74.8)	25.6 (78.1)	27.7 (81.9)	28.7 (83.7)	28.7 (83.7)	28.3 (82.9)	28.0 (82.4)	25.8 (78.4)	24.2 (75.6)	22.0 (71.6)	25.4 (77.7)
Mean daily minimum °C (°F)	18.7 (65.7)	19.0 (66.2)	20.2 (68.4)	22.5 (72.5)	24.5 (76.1)	25.7 (78.3)	25.7 (78.3)	25.5 (77.9)	25.3 (77.5)	24.0 (75.2)	22.1 (71.8)	20.2 (68.4)	22.8 (73.0)
Average precipitation mm (inches)	37 (1.5)	39 (1.5)	14 (0.6)	37 (1.5)	18 (0.7)	206 (8.1)	222 (8.7)	256 (10.1)	245 (9.6)	149 (5.9)	43 (1.7)	34 (1.3)	1,300 (51.2)
Source: FAO

== Politics and government ==
The island is part of Taiwan with the postal code 817. Although there are no long-term inhabitants on the island, Pratas is administered by the Kaohsiung City Government under Cijin District. The island has been uninhabited, yet nations (including China and Japan) have claimed it to be their overseas territory.

=== Military ===
As of November 2020, about five hundred Taiwanese marines were stationed on Pratas Island. The island has a network of underground bunkers. According to regulations updated on December 2, 2020, in the event that communication is cut off between mainland Taiwan and Pratas Island or Taiping Island (Itu Aba), the highest-ranking local officer can make the decision to fire back at assailants.

=== Cross-strait relations ===
The People's Republic of China claims the Pratas Islands (东沙群岛) as part of Chengqu, Shanwei (Swabue), Guangdong Province.

According to an anonymous PLA source, plans created around 2010 by China for an air defence identification zone in the South China Sea include Pratas Island airspace. The PLA's actions near the southwest corner of the Taiwan ADIZ and Pratas Island in late 2020 led to speculation that the area might be declared part of an ADIZ by China.

In the later half of 2020, repeated reports of Chinese military exercises and flyovers near the island were interpreted as an apparent attempt to cut off the supply line between Pratas Island and mainland Taiwan.

The Taiwanese coast guard routinely expels Chinese fishermen from the waters around Pratas Island. These fishermen engage in harmful fishing practices including cyanide fishing.

== Pratas Island settlement ==
As an island with no permanent inhabitants, it is visited largely by fishermen, military personnel and researchers. Amateur radio operators participating in the DXCC and Islands on the Air awards programs also visit occasionally.

=== Landmarks ===
An obelisk was erected after 1946.

In 1954 the ROC Government personnel stationed on Pratas erected a stone tablet on the southern side of the island, facing the ocean.

The Da Wang temple is dedicated to 'Kuang Kang' and 'The South China Sea Goddess' Mazu. It is said that the statue of Guan Gong came to Pratas Island on a canoe in 1948. The soldiers on Pratas Island built a temple to worship her in 1975. Today, the canoe is still kept in the temple. The joss sticks and candles are donated by soldiers, as was the golden sign hung in front of the statue. There is an 'Ever Green' pavilion in front of the temple which was also built by the soldiers. It is the most verdant place on the island.

The Minister for Internal Affairs of the ROC erected the South China Sea Defense stone tablet to declare Republic of China sovereignty in 1989.

In July 1991 the Kaohsiung City Government erected the Pratas Island memorial stone tablet as a symbol that Pratas Island falls within the jurisdiction of Kaohsiung City. Within Kaohsiung, the island belongs to Cijin District.

The ROC Government established the Triangulation Benchmark as the triangulation point for Pratas Island in December 1991. There are words on each side of the base of the triangulation point stone tablet. They read 'The Pratas Triangulation Point' on the front, and 'Longitude: 116^{o} 43" 42.5601'E, Latitude: 20^{o} 42' 6.2415'N, Height: 2.4875 meters.' The words 'Defend the South China Sea', written by the commander, Lo Ben Li, were also engraved on the stone tablet. The National Tsing Hua University webpage about the island states: "In addition to making it more convenient to survey and draw navigational maps, and to construct and develop facilities on the island, the establishment of the triangulation point is also the basis of our sovereign rights."

=== Public buildings ===
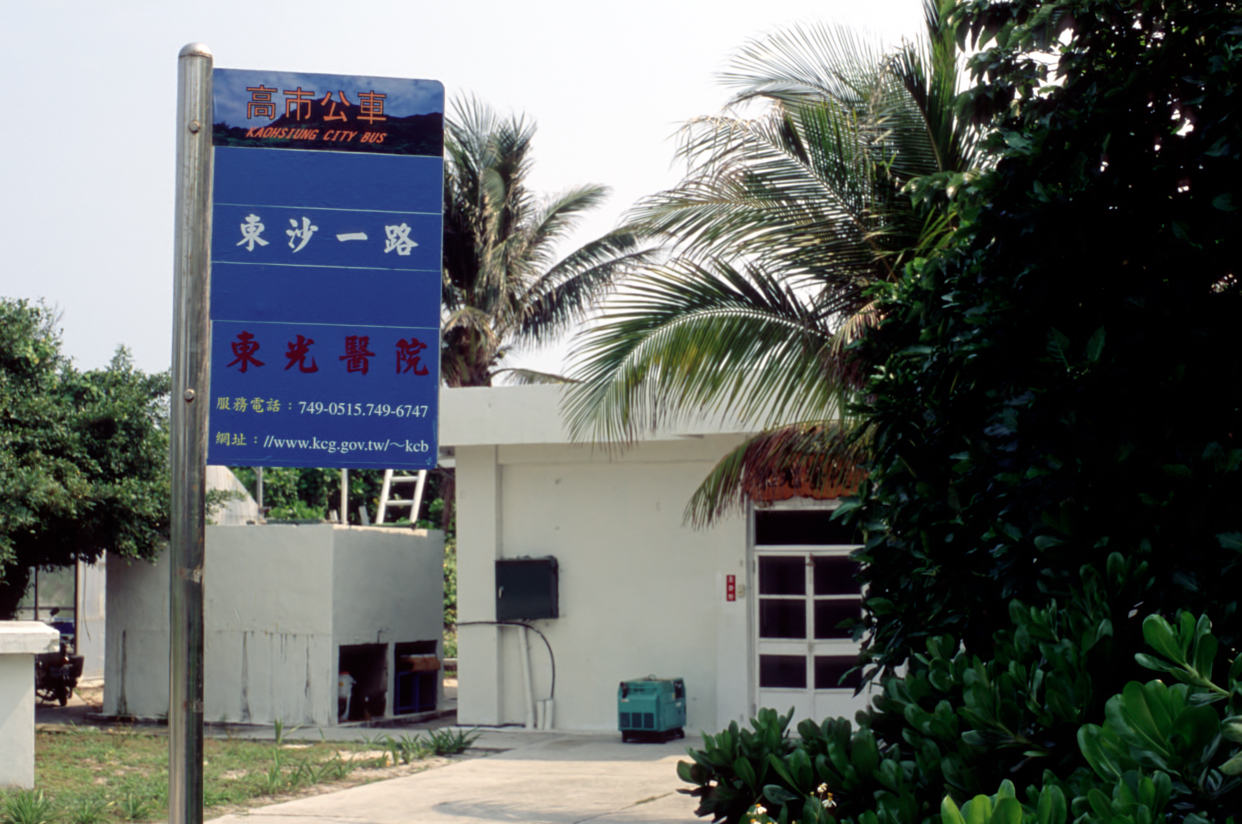
Hospital, 2004

The library is located on one side of the main plaza, and is the center for soldiers to use educational services. The library contains more than two thousand books.

The military post office is Office No. 67. The Ministry of Transportation and Communications issued the 'South China Sea Islands Map Stamps' in 1996, as a set of two stamps. The inscription 'South China Sea Defense' from the national stone tablet on Pratas Island was printed on the five-dollar stamp, and the 'Defend the South China Sea' inscription from the national stone tablet on Taiping Island was printed on the seventeen-dollar stamp. The background was the south China coastline, Taiwan and Hainan Island with the blue sky and sea. This was the first time that the ROC had issued stamps with the theme of the South China Sea.

In 1987 the military and civilian occupants built the 'Pratas Fishermen's Service Station'. The station was built in traditional Chinese courtyard house style, and provides convenient services for fishermen and boats in the South China Sea, insuring the fishermen's safety and upholding ROC sovereignty. The services provided include lodging, medical rescue, entertainment and supply. The station also provides lodging for the scientists who come to conduct research on the island.

In 2012 National Sun Yat-sen University's Dongsha Atoll Research Station (DARS) was established for biology, biogeochemistry, and oceanography research.

=== Energy ===
Diesel-fueled generators are used to power the island. In March 2016, a solar energy system built by the Coast Guard Administration went into operation. The system covers an area of 310.6 m^{2} and produces 53,200 kWh of electricity each year.

== Transportation ==
The Dongsha Island Airport features a runway located on the north end of Pratas Island with a small airport terminal at the eastern end. The airport is used by the ROC military. A main shack and subordinate shack are located on the southeast end of the island. There are no refueling facilities.

Two piers on the southeast shore allow for small watercraft to land.

There is one city bus route, the Dongsha 1 Route. It has no fixed schedule and will only depart if there's a visitor.

A circle with a radius of 10 nmi (19 km) centered on Pratas Island, referred to as VHR7, is a prohibited area for aeronautical purposes. The 'VH' in VHR7 denotes 'Hong Kong' and the 'R' denotes a 'Restricted Area'. Pratas Island and VHR7 are located within the Hong Kong Flight Information Region (FIR).

== Gallery ==
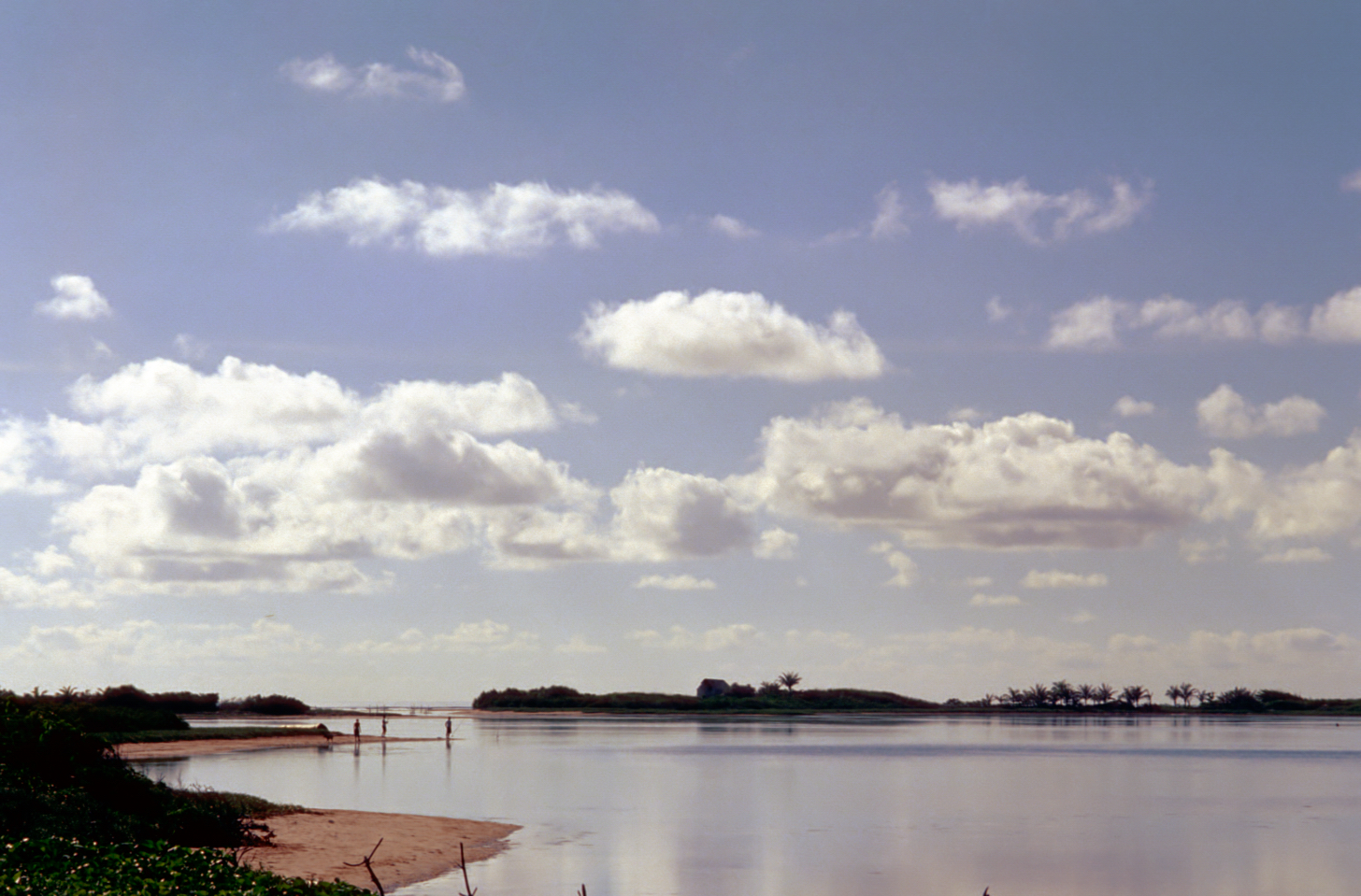
Pratas Island Lagoon

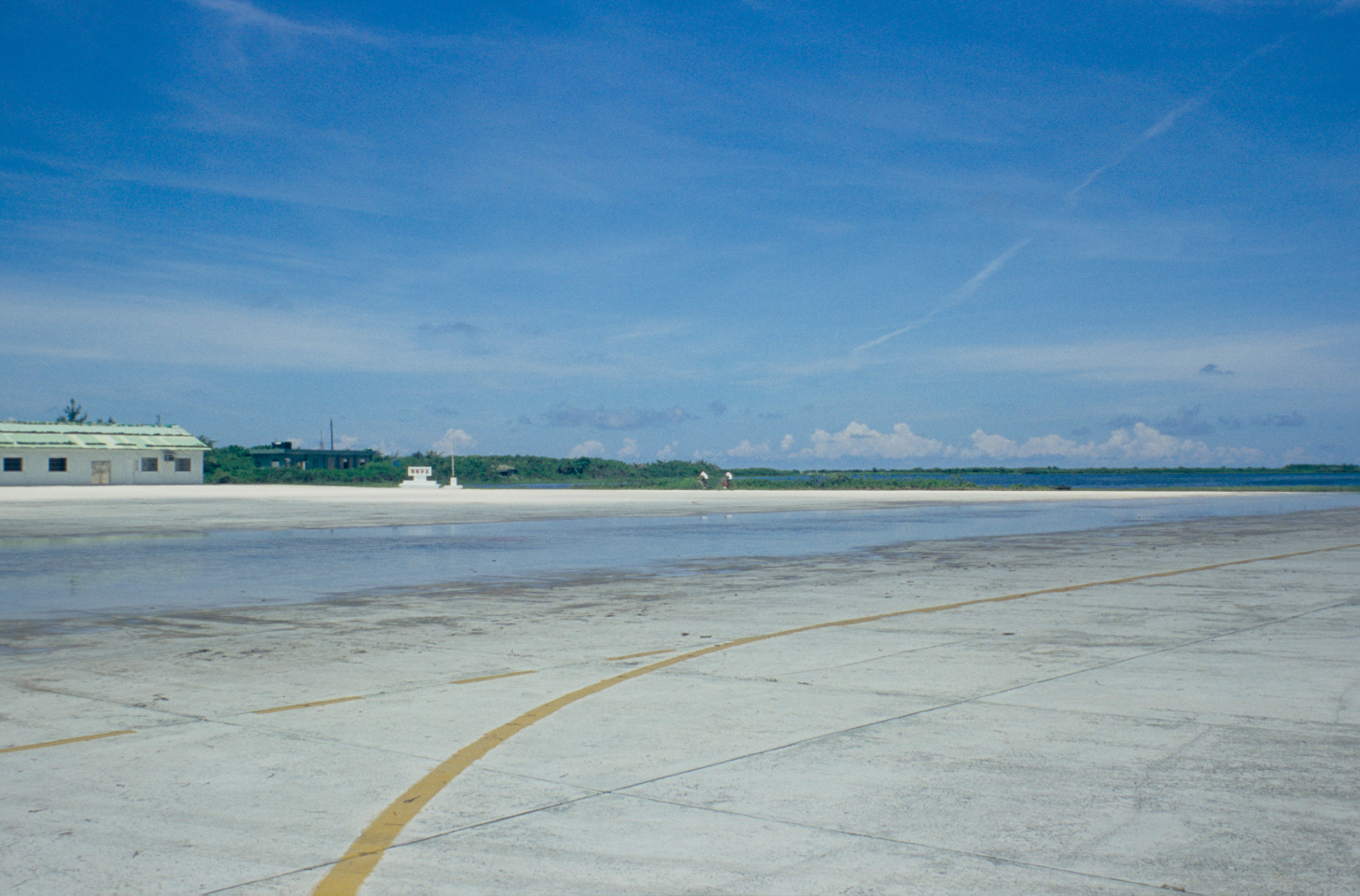
Airport

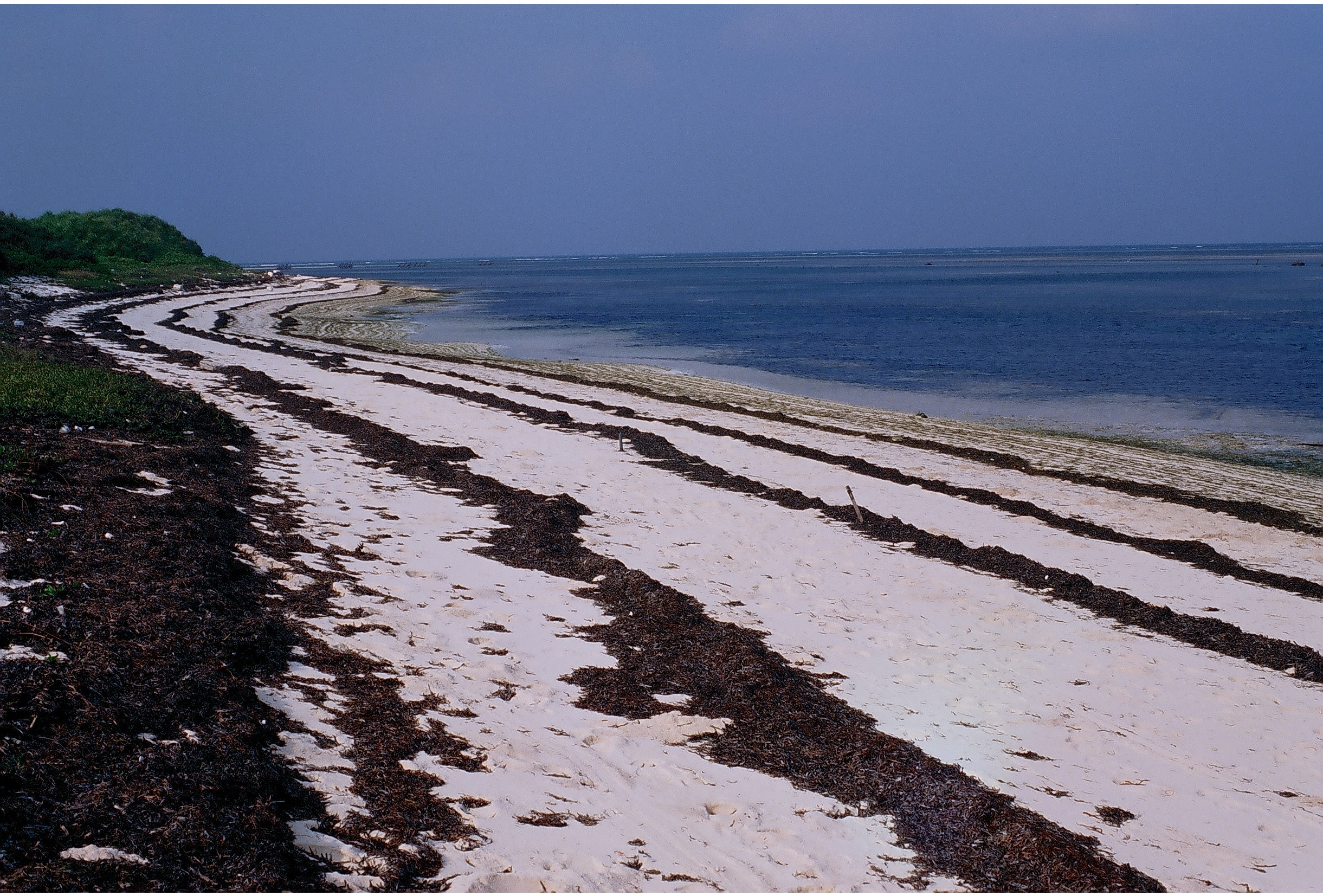
Pratas Island Beach

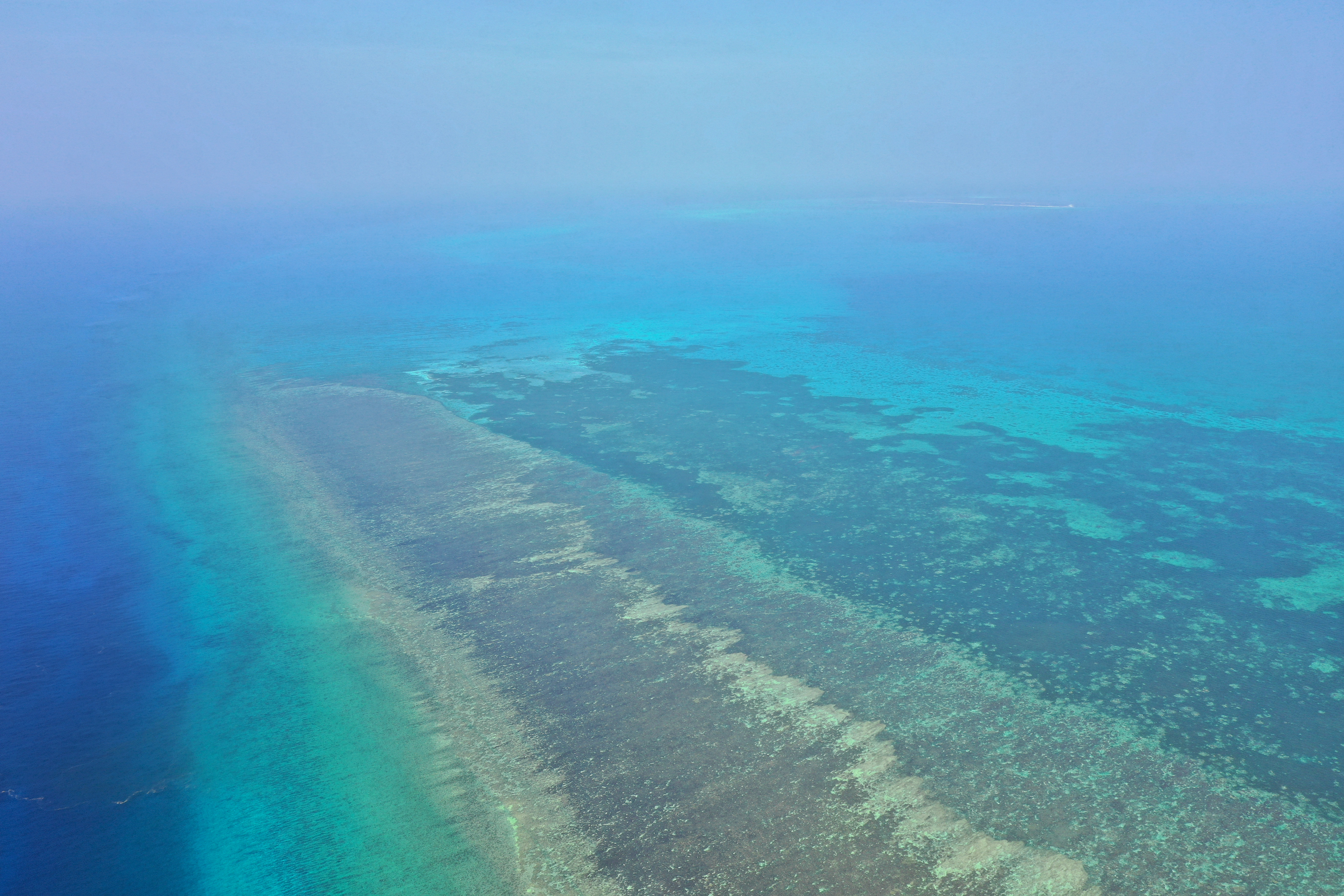
Southern edge of Pratas Atoll
(Pratas Island can be seen in the distance)

== See also ==
- List of islands of Taiwan
- List of Taiwanese superlatives
- Politics of the Republic of China
- South China Sea Islands
