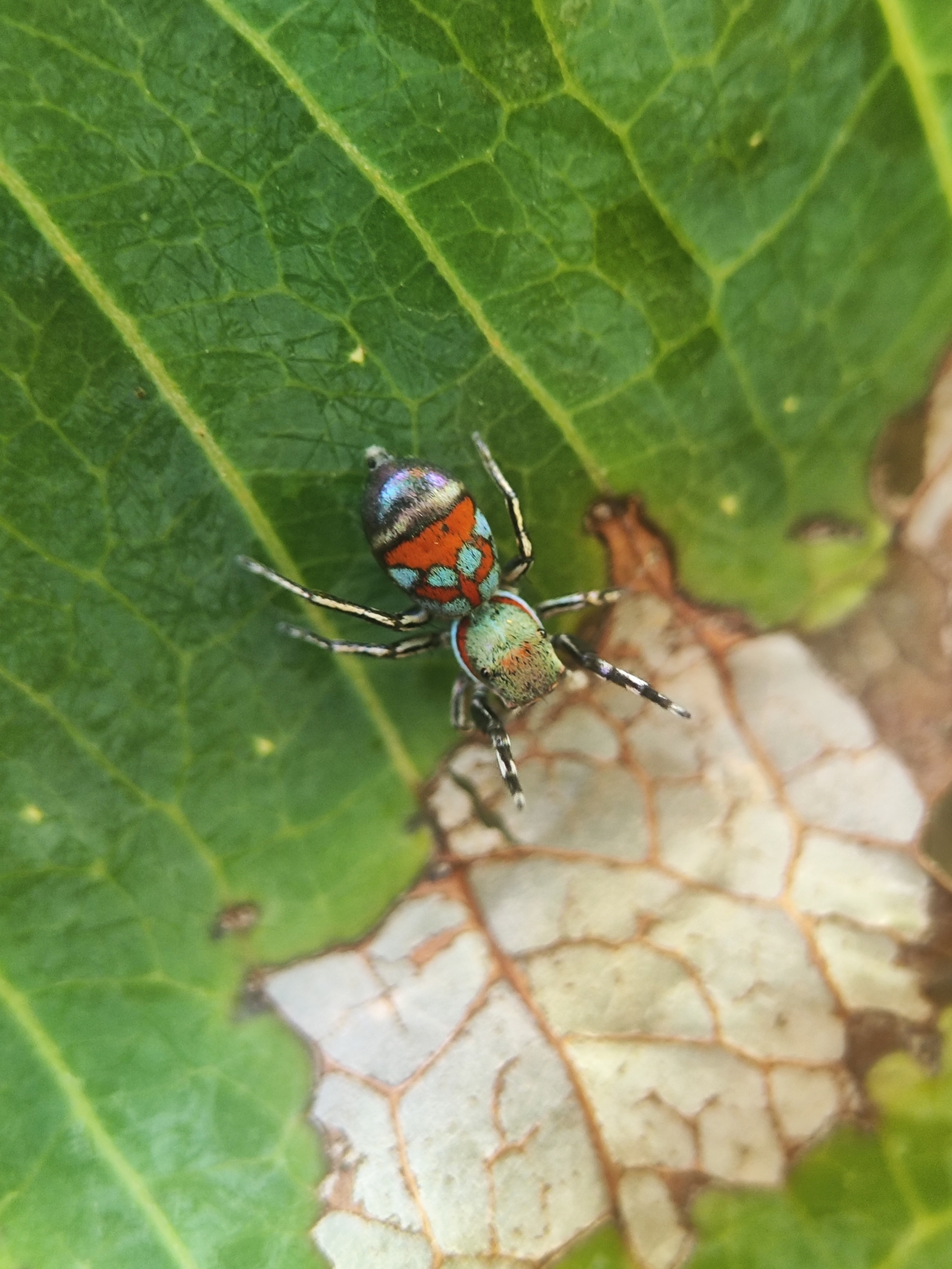
- Female from Ernakulam, Kochi, Kerala, India

Scientific classification
- Kingdom: Animalia
- Phylum: Arthropoda
- Subphylum: Chelicerata
- Class: Arachnida
- Order: Araneae
- Infraorder: Araneomorphae
- Family: Salticidae
- Genus: Siler
- Species: S. niser

Binomial name
- Siler niser Caleb, Parag & Datta-Roy, 2023

= Siler niser =

Species of jumping spider

Siler niser is a species of jumping spider endemic to India, It has been proposed the common name glossy jumping spider by the discoverers of the species. The specific epithet is an acronym of the National Institute of Science Education and Research (NISER), as the type locality of the species is the institute's campus.

== Description ==
The carapace of a male Siler niser is covered with a mixture of bluish and greenish scales, with blue scales extending below the anterior lateral eyes and running along the rim. The legs are yellow brown with a few interspersed iridescent scales and dark brown longitudinal stripes. The palps are brown. Cymbium, tibia and patella are all covered with white hairs. Abdomen is covered with iridescent scales along anterior, lateral and posterior regions, with the anterior half with a distinct pattern composed of a reddish anchor-shaped mark and four bright blue spots.

While the female's carapace is covered with white and grey scales, lateral margins covered with reddish scales, outer-rim covered with bluish-white scales. The legs retain the yellow brown color of the male but with longitudinal dark brown and white stripes. Abdomen is greyish with a similar, but incomplete pattern as seen in the males. In darker females, the red band is completely black, this perhaps occurs in older females when the scales are lost.

== Range ==
It is currently known to be endemic to India, its type locality is National Institute of Science Education and Research (NISER), Odisha.

== Ecology & Habitat ==
Specimens of Siler niser were found in acute vicinity of the ant Camponotus compressus. Individuals were myrmecophagic like of S. semiglaucus. Both sexes waved the first pair of legs in the air, perhaps mimicking the antennae of the ants. This waving behaviour was observed both in the presence as well as in the absence of ants. Individuals are extremely agile and move to the underside of leaves as soon as they detected any external movement.

Type specimens were collected from Hyptis suaveolens and Lannea coromandelica seedling foliage, both about 2 feet above the ground, during the month of May.

== Threats ==
The type specimen individuals of Siler niser were collected from a grassland-shrubland type habitat. These habitats are under threat as they are often labelled as unproductive and the biodiversity they harbour remains poorly documented.
