= Nanwei Tan =

Coral shoal northwest of Dongsha Island, South China Sea

Nanwei Tan (Chinese: 南衛灘) is located approximately 40 nautical miles northwest of Dongsha Island in the northern part of the South China Sea, about 4 kilometers south of Beiwei Tan, and about 80 kilometers from Dongsha Island. It is a submerged coral reef, classified as a submerged shoal. The shallowest point has a depth of 58 meters.

Nanwei Tan is currently under the effective control of the Government of the Republic of China (Taiwan), administratively falling under the jurisdiction of Cijin District in Kaohsiung City. The Government of the People's Republic of China also claims sovereignty over it, and it is administratively under the jurisdiction of the government of Jieshi, Lufeng City, Shanwei, Guangdong Province.

== See also ==
- Beiwei Tan
- Dongsha Island
- South China Sea
