= Beiwei Tan =

Coral shoal northwest of Dongsha Island, Dongsha Islands, South China Sea, China

Beiwei Tan (Chinese: 北衛灘) is a submerged coral shoal, circular with a shallowest depth of about 60 meters. approximately 44 nautical miles northwest of Dongsha Island in the northeastern part of the Nansha Islands in the northern South China Sea, located about 80 kilometers away from Dongsha Island.

Beiwai Tan is under the control of the government of Taiwan, administered under Cijin District in Kaohsiung City. The government of the People's Republic of China also claims sovereignty over it and administers it under the jurisdiction of the People's Government of Jieshi Town, Lufeng City, Shanwei, Guangdong Province.

== See also ==
- Nanwei Tan
- Dongsha Island
- South China Sea
