= Cuthbert Collingwood (naturalist) =

English surgeon and zoologist

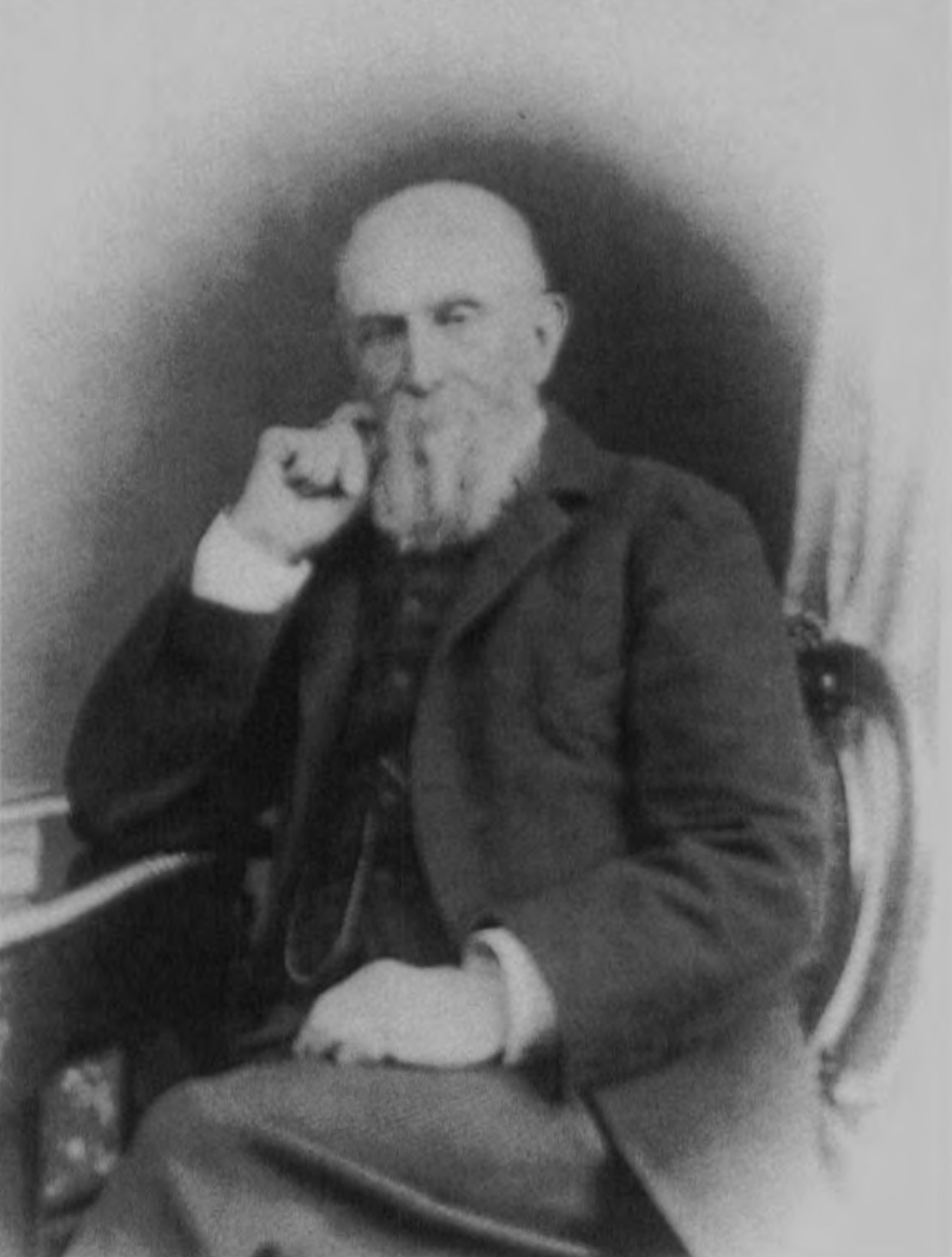
- Cuthbert Collingwood, c. 1890s
- Born: 25 December 1826; Greenwich, England
- Died: 20 October 1908 (aged 81); London, England
- Resting place: Nunhead Cemetery, London
- Known for: Marine zoology; debates with Darwin
- Scientific career
- Fields: Natural history, medicine, theology
- Workplaces: Liverpool Royal Infirmary School of Medicine

Cuthbert Collingwood (25 December 1826 – 20 October 1908) was an English naturalist, physician, and theologian. He lectured in botany and medicine in Liverpool, served as surgeon‑naturalist on voyages in the China Seas, and published widely on marine zoology. A critic of Charles Darwin’s theory of natural selection, he corresponded with Darwin and Henry Walter Bates and remained aligned with Louis Agassiz’s views. Collingwood was also active in the New Jerusalem Church and wrote theological works seeking to reconcile science and religion. He died in London in 1908 and was buried in Nunhead Cemetery, London.

== Life ==
Cuthbert Collingwood was born at Greenwich on 25 December 1826, the fifth of six sons of Samuel Collingwood (1786–1852), an architect and contractor, and his wife Frances Collingwood. His parents were first cousins, Frances was the daughter of Samuel Collingwood (1762–1841), printer to the Oxford Clarendon Press, whilst Samuel was the printers nephew.

He was educated at King's College School and matriculated at Christ Church, Oxford, on 8 April 1845, graduating B.A. in 1849, M.A. in 1852 and M.B. in 1854. He subsequently studied medicine at Edinburgh University and Guy’s Hospital, and also attended courses in Paris and Vienna, where he worked under Professor Ernst Brücke in histology. At Oxford he attended lectures by William Buckland, and in Edinburgh he studied botany under John Hutton Balfour, winning a student prize and joining field excursions across Scotland, which he later recalled as among the happiest times of his life.

In 1858 Collingwood was appointed lecturer in botany at the Liverpool Royal Infirmary School of Medicine, a post he held until 1866. He also became senior physician at the Northern Hospital, Liverpool, and lecturer in biology at the Liverpool School of Science.

He was active in the city’s intellectual life, supporting the Liverpool Naturalists’ Field Club and helping to organise dredging surveys of the Mersey estuary. In 1861 he presented a scheme to the British Association for the Advancement of Science encouraging the mercantile marine to collect natural history specimens during voyages.

From 1866 to 1867 he served as surgeon and naturalist aboard HMS Rifleman and HMS Serpent on surveying voyages in the China Seas. His observations of tropical marine life were later published in Rambles of a Naturalist on the Shores and Waters of the China Seas (1868); the collections he returned with were partly deposited at the Liverpool Museum, and the observations helped establish the region as a site of tropical marine biodiversity. He was elected a Fellow of the Linnean Society in 1853 and served on its council in 1868.

Collingwood married Clara in 1869 (she died 1871), daughter of Lieut.-col. Sir Robert Mowbray of Cockavine, Scotland; they had no children.

In 1876–77 Collingwood travelled in Palestine and Egypt. In 1901 he settled in Paris, where he continued to write on both natural history and theology; he returned to London in 1907 and died there on 20 October 1908.

== Works ==
Collingwood’s writings spanned both natural history and theology.

=== Scientific publications ===
- Twenty-one Essays on Various Subjects, Scientific and Literary (1865) – a collection of essays blending natural history, philosophy, and literary reflections.
- Rambles of a Naturalist on the Shores and Waters of the China Seas (1868) – his best‑known work, documenting voyages aboard HMS Rifleman and HMS Serpent, with descriptions of marine life and coastal ecology.
- Around forty papers on natural history in scientific periodicals, including detailed observations from his China Seas expedition.

=== Selected papers ===
- "On recurrent animal form, and its significance in systematic zoology," Annals and Magazine of Natural History, 3rd series, vol. 6 (1860), pp. 81–91.
- "On the Nudibranchiate Mollusca inhabiting the estuary of the Dee," Annals and Magazine of Natural History, 3rd series, vol. 6 (1860), pp. 196–202.
- "Remarks upon oceanic forms of Hydrozoa observed at sea," Annals and Magazine of Natural History, 3rd series, vol. 20 (1867), pp. 309–314.
- "New species of Nudibranchs from the Eastern Seas," Journal of the Linnean Society of London, Zoology, vol. 14 (1879), pp. 737–738.
- "The Natural History of Pratas Island in the China Sea," Journal of Science (April 1867).
- "Instinct and Reason," read before the Victoria Institute, 2 December 1889; published in Transactions of the Victoria Institute, vol. XXIV (1890), pp. 83–104.

=== Children's book ===
- The Travelling Birds (1872; 2nd ed. 1873) – a children's book on the migration of birds, in which the robin, the swallow and the sparrow each relate their own story, with a coloured frontispiece.

=== Theological and philosophical writings ===
Collingwood was a prominent member of the New Jerusalem Church. He published several expositions of his religious beliefs:

- A Vision of Creation: A Poem with a Geological Introduction (1872) – an attempt to reconcile geological science with biblical creation.
- New Studies in Christian Theology (1883, published anonymously) – reflections on theology in light of modern science.
- Christ as Found in the Evangelists Compared with Present-Day Teaching (1883) – a comparative theological study.
- The Bible and the Age: Principles of Consistent Interpretation (1886) – a work on biblical hermeneutics and consistency of interpretation.

=== Debates with Darwin ===
Collingwood was present at the meeting of the Linnean Society on 1 July 1858 when the joint papers by Charles Darwin and Alfred Russel Wallace on natural selection were first read. Following Louis Agassiz’s critical review of Darwin’s On the Origin of Species in 1860, Collingwood aligned himself with Agassiz’s views and published two papers that year: On Homomorphism: or organic representative form and On recurrent animal form and its significance in systematic zoology. In these works he argued that Darwin had overlooked phenomena such as alternation of generations, and that similarities of form across distant groups arose from analogous habits rather than common descent.

Collingwood sent his papers to Darwin, who replied on 14 March 1861. Darwin acknowledged that there was no direct proof that variation was unlimited, but defended natural selection as a hypothesis comparable to the wave theory of light, capable of explaining a wide range of biological phenomena. He disagreed with Collingwood’s interpretation of "perfection" in natural structures and saw no essential difference between alternate generations and metamorphosis.

Darwin later mentioned Collingwood’s assertions in correspondence with Henry Walter Bates, particularly regarding mimicry. Bates’s 1861 paper on mimetic butterflies provided evidence for natural selection and was regarded as a decisive rebuttal of Collingwood’s analogy-based explanation.

Collingwood continued to resist Darwinian explanations throughout his career. In his paper Instinct and Reason (read before the Victoria Institute in 1889 and published in 1890), he argued that animal instinct and human reason formed a continuum, but rejected the view that natural selection alone could account for the development of higher faculties. In his later reminiscences he wrote: "I am not a Darwinian, and believe that his theories will some day be superseded and neglected to give place to a much deeper and more philosophical theory of Creation."

== Legacy ==
Collingwood’s contributions to Victorian science and theology left a mixed but notable legacy. As a naturalist he was part of the Liverpool circle of marine biologists, encouraging specimen collection for the city’s museum and promoting dredging surveys of the Mersey estuary. His fieldwork in the China Seas produced valuable observations of tropical marine life, later cited by other zoologists.

Although his opposition to Darwin’s theory of natural selection placed him on the losing side of the evolutionary debates, his writings illustrate the range of responses to Darwinism in the mid‑nineteenth century and his correspondence with Darwin and Henry Walter Bates forms part of the historical record of those discussions.

Two species have been named in his honour:

- Goniobranchus collingwoodi (Rudman, 1987), named after Collingwood, who collected nudibranchs in the South China Sea.
- Siler collingwoodi (O. Pickard-Cambridge, 1871), a jumping spider originally described as Salticus collingwoodii from specimens Collingwood collected in the China Seas.
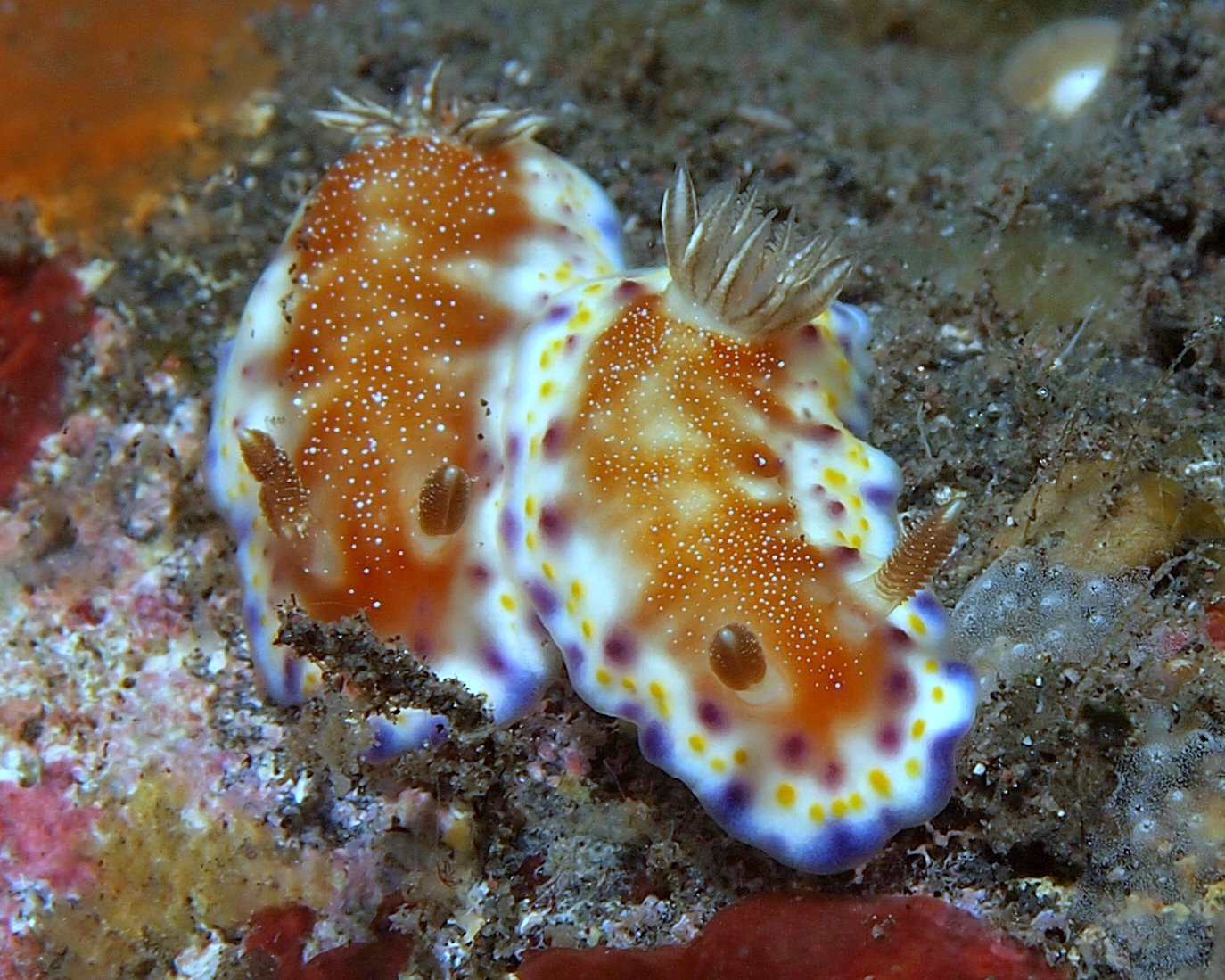
Goniobranchus collingwoodi

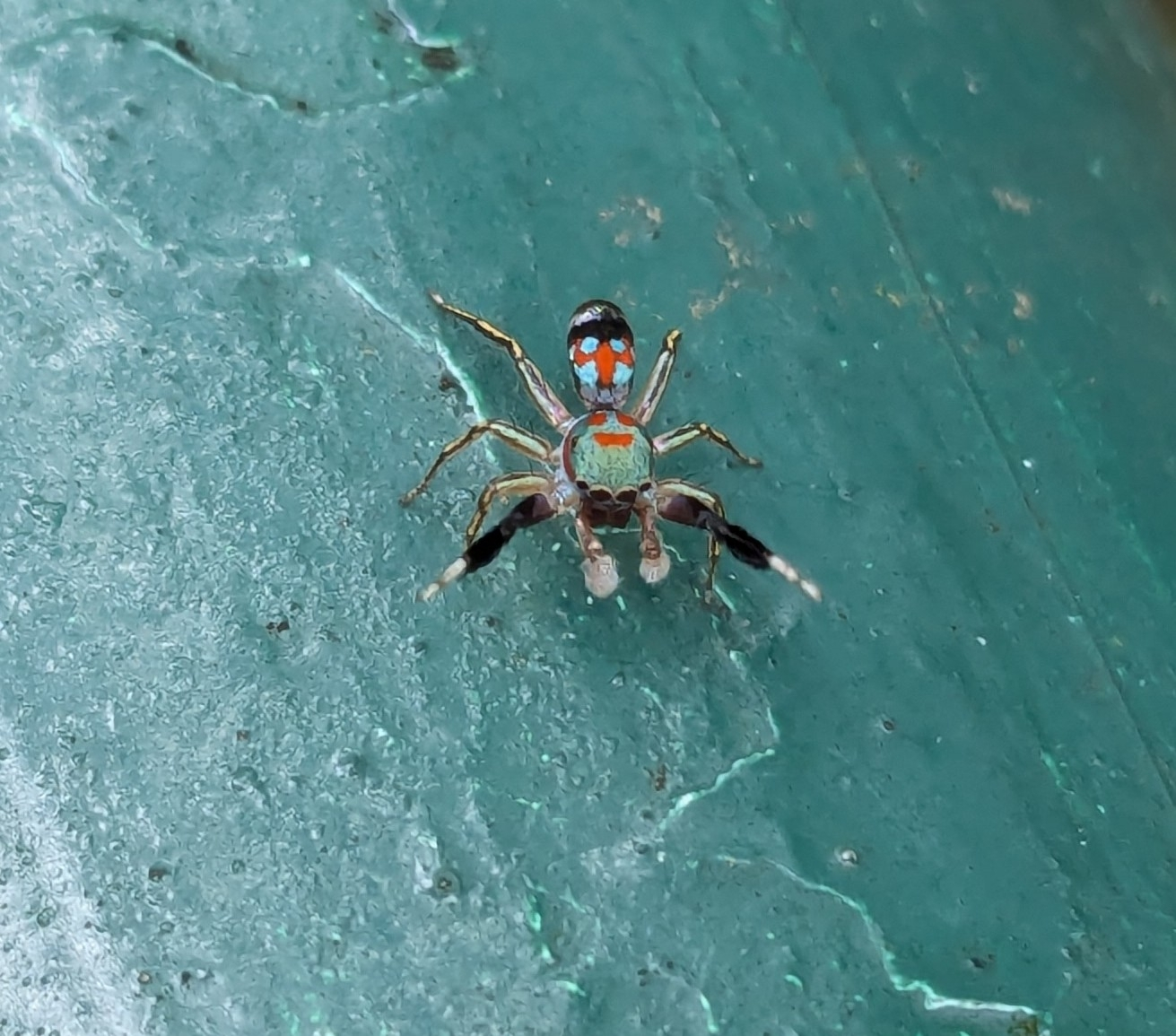
Siler collingwoodi

Collingwood’s theological works, written as a member of the New Jerusalem Church, reflect the continuing effort among some Victorian intellectuals to reconcile scientific discovery with religious belief. His dual career as physician, naturalist and theologian makes him a notable figure of the period.
