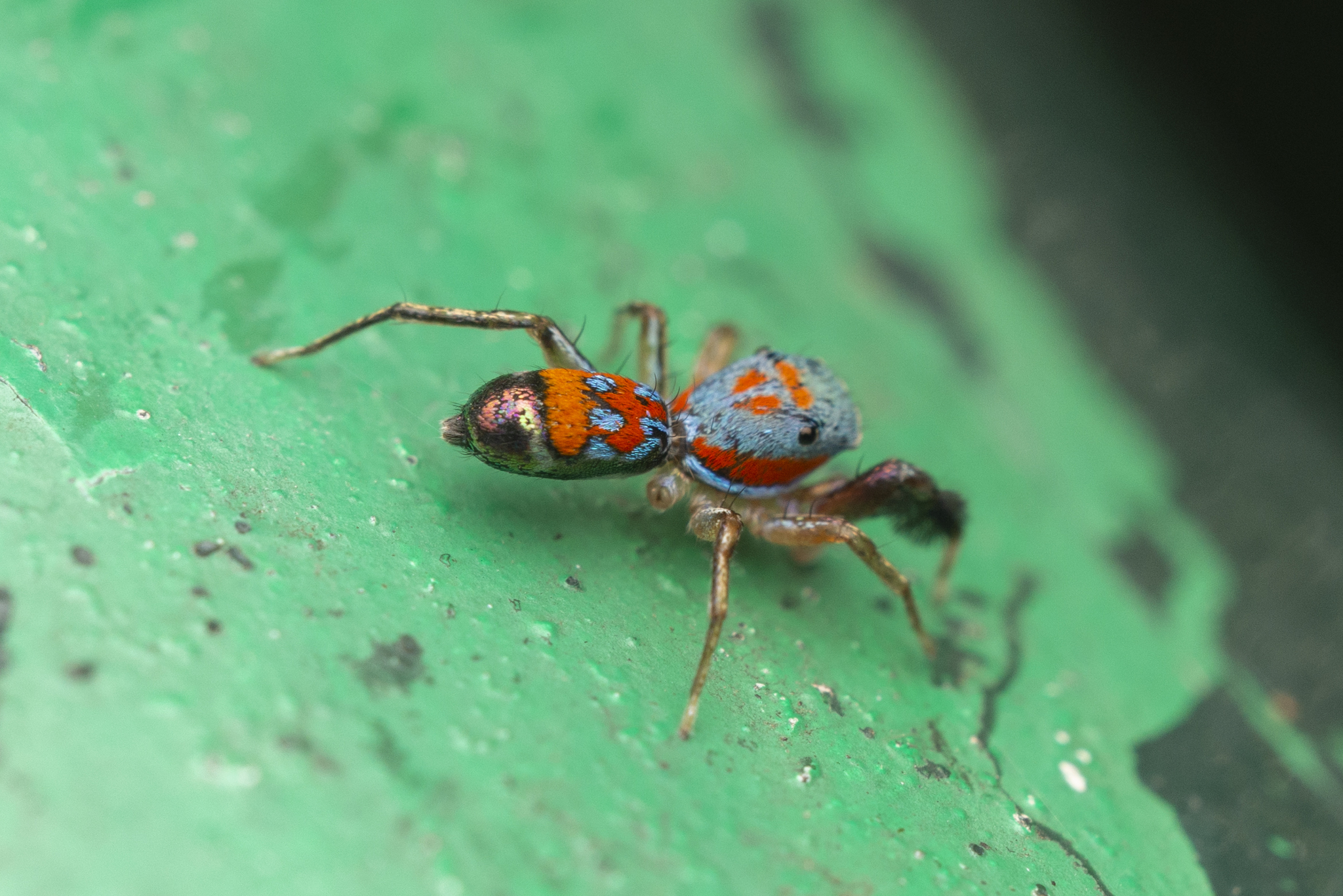
- Specimen from Hong kong

Scientific classification
- Kingdom: Animalia
- Phylum: Arthropoda
- Subphylum: Chelicerata
- Class: Arachnida
- Order: Araneae
- Infraorder: Araneomorphae
- Family: Salticidae
- Genus: Siler
- Species: S. collingwoodi

Binomial name
- Siler collingwoodi (O. Pickard-Cambridge, 1871)

Synonyms
- Salticus collingwoodii O. Pickard-Cambridge, 1871; Cosmophasis collingwodi Simon, 1901

= Siler collingwoodi =

Species of jumping spider

Siler collingwoodi is a species of jumping spider of the genus Siler. It is found in China and Japan.

The species is notable for its complex antipredator adaptations, using both camouflage and Batesian mimicry of ant behavior to avoid predation.

== Taxonomy ==
The species was originally described by Octavius Pickard-Cambridge in 1871 as Salticus collingwoodii based on a female specimen collected by Cuthbert Collingwood during his travels in the China Sea region. It was later transferred to the genus Cosmophasis by Eugène Simon in 1901, and finally placed in its current genus Siler by Jerzy Prószyński in 1984.

The holotype is housed in the Oxford University Museum of Natural History (formerly Hope Entomological Collections), Oxford, UK.

== Distribution ==
Siler collingwoodi is found in China and Japan. It has been recorded from southern Hainan in China and was first recorded from Japan by Baba in 2010.

== Description ==
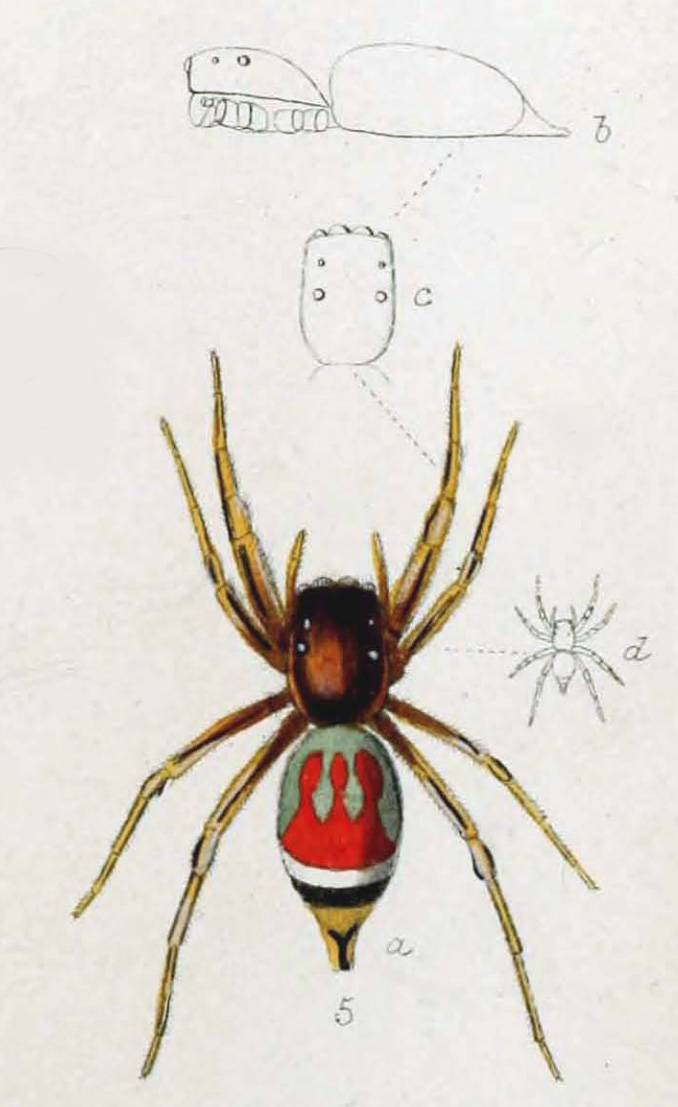
original drawing of female by O. Pickard-Cambridge

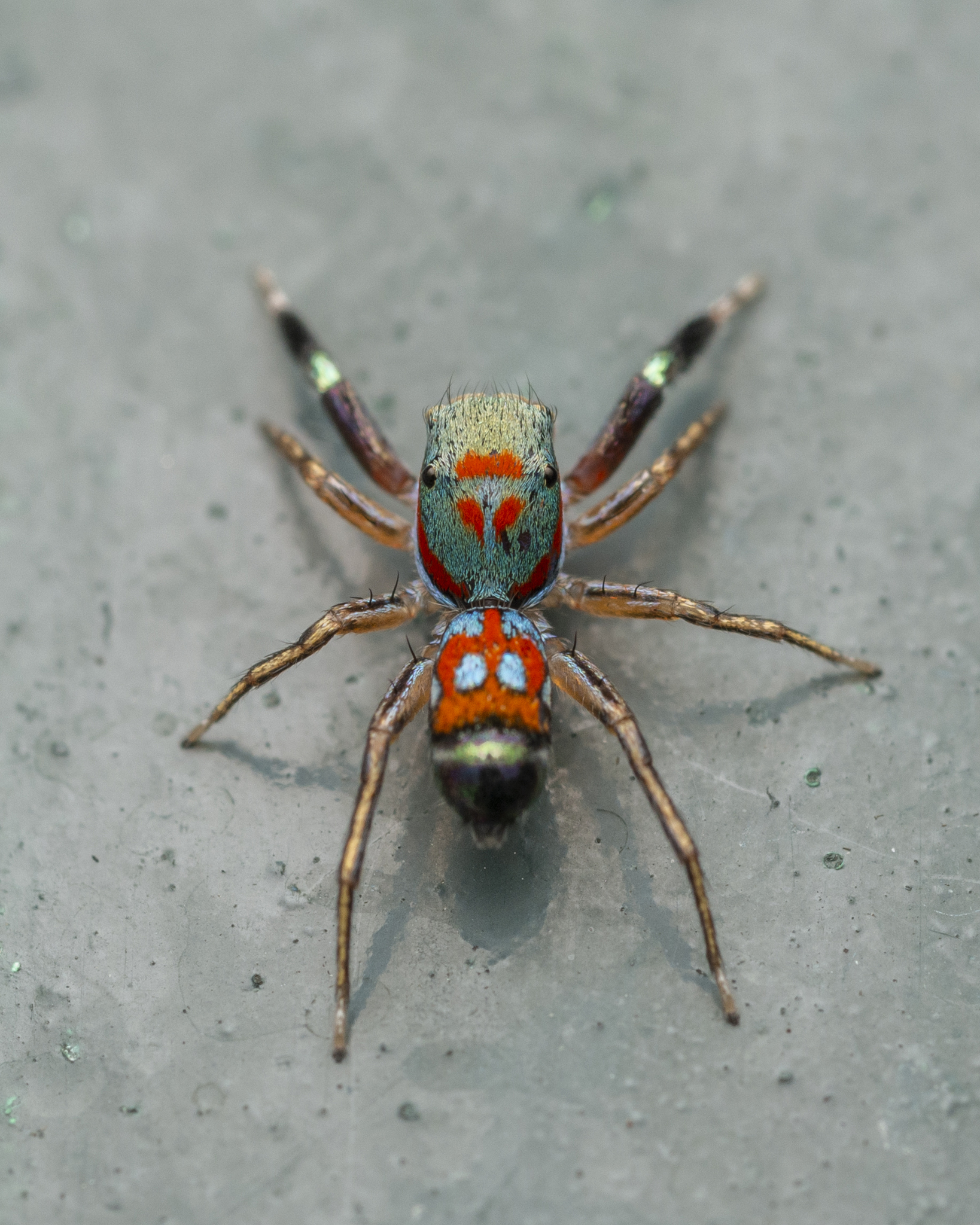

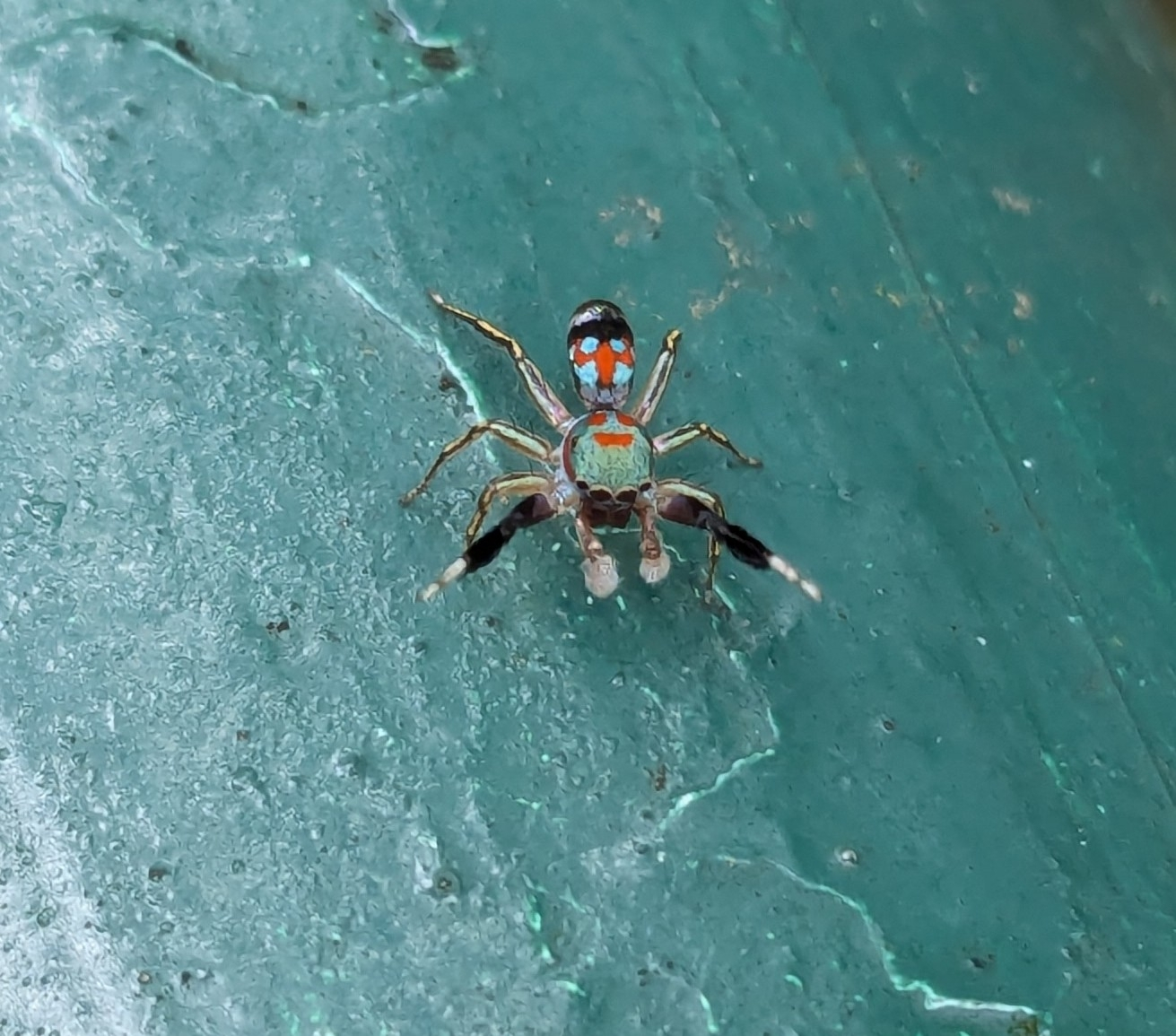

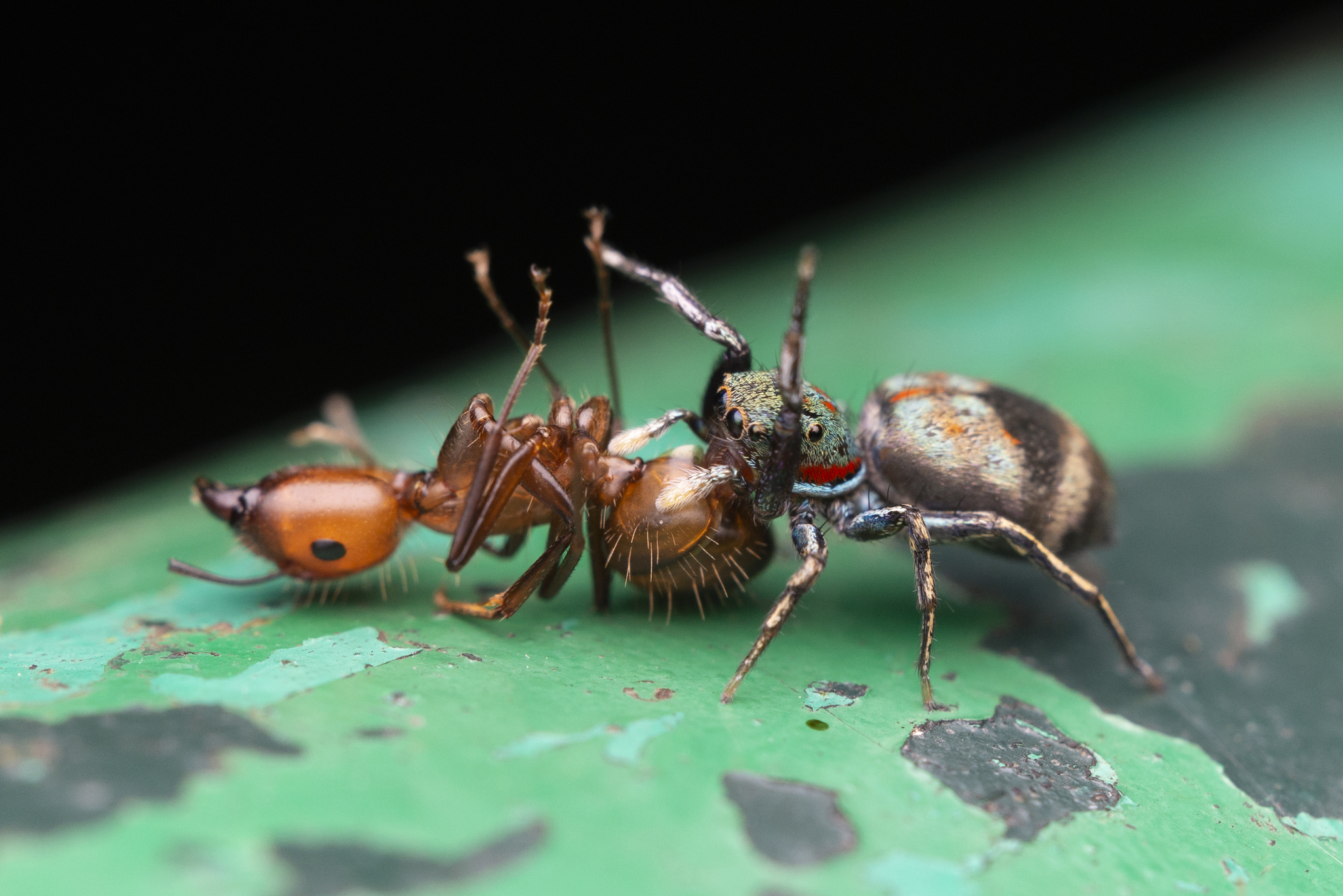
preying on ant

Siler collingwoodi is a small jumping spider with males measuring 3.06–4.47 mm in body length and females 4.59–4.94 mm. Unlike typical ant-mimicking spiders that display brown or black coloration similar to ants, this species exhibits brilliant body coloration that provides camouflage among plants.

Males have a basically red cephalothorax covered with bluish metallic hairs and marginated with white hairs. The areas around the eyes are dark, and the first pair of legs (tibia, patella and femur) are dark brown with light brown tarsi, while legs II-IV are light brown. The abdomen is covered with silver hairs except for characteristic red markings and black bands.

Females have similar coloration and markings to males. The original 1871 description noted the female cephalothorax as bright reddish yellow-brown with a narrow band of bright shining silvery hairs, and a patch of short bright scarlet hairs between the posterior eyes.

The species displays striking orange and blue patterning with a reflective metallic iridescent gleam, particularly visible in juveniles. The coloration and markings are highly variable depending on the degree of hair loss.

== Behavior ==
Siler collingwoodi exhibits remarkable antipredator adaptations through a combination of plant camouflage and ant mimicry. The species raises its front legs to mimic ant antennae, bobs its abdomen, and adopts ant-like gait patterns. Unlike perfect mimics that imitate a single species, S. collingwoodi demonstrates "imperfect mimicry" by resembling multiple ant species simultaneously, which may allow it to expand its habitat range.

Research has shown that this dual strategy is differentially effective against different predators. The ant mimicry successfully deters spider predators such as Portia labiata, but is ineffective against praying mantises like Gonypeta brunneri, which attack both ants and mimics indiscriminately. This difference may be due to the relative size and injury risk to each predator type when attacking actual ants.

The effectiveness of the mimicry is compromised when the spider loses limbs, as this impairs its ability to accurately imitate ant locomotion.

Like other members of the genus Siler, this species is known to hunt ants and other small arthropods. They are active hunters that do not build webs to capture prey, instead using their jumping ability and excellent vision to stalk and capture insects.
