= USS Frank Knox =

Gearing-class destroyer

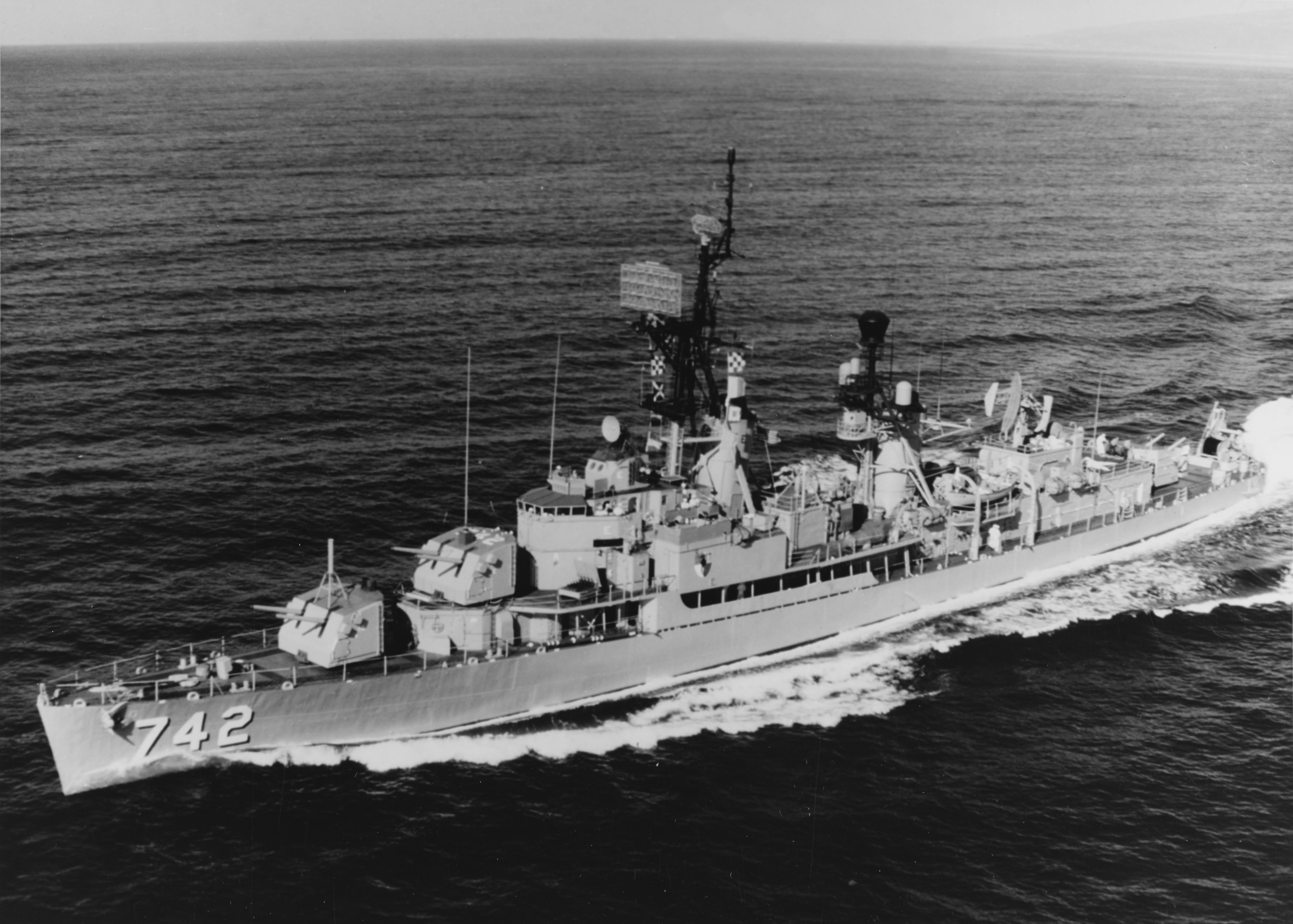
- USS Frank Knox (DD-742) underway off Hawaii, 1969

History

United States
- Name: USS Frank Knox (DD-742)
- Namesake: Frank Knox
- Laid down: 8 May 1944
- Launched: 17 September 1944
- Commissioned: 11 December 1944
- Reclassified: DDR-742, 18 March 1949
- Modernized: 1960-1961 (FRAM II)
- Reclassified: DD-742, 1 January 1969
- Decommissioned: January 1971
- Stricken: 3 February 1971
- Identification: Callsign: NHWQ; Hull number: DD-742
- Fate: Transferred to Greece, 3 February 1971

History

Greece
- Name: Themistoklis (D210)
- Namesake: Themistocles
- Acquired: 3 February 1971
- Commissioned: 3 February 1971
- Decommissioned: 31 August 1992
- Fate: Sunk as target, 12 September 2001

General characteristics
- Class & type: Gearing-class destroyer
- Displacement: Standard: 2425 tons; Full load: 3520 tons
- Length: 119 m (390 ft)
- Beam: 12.4 m (40.7 ft)
- Draft: 5.8 m (19 ft)
- Propulsion: four Babcock & Wilcox boilers, two shaft steam turbines, 60,000 shp (45 MW)
- Speed: 33 knots (61 km/h)
- Range: 4,500 nmi. at 20 knots; (8,300 km at 37 km/h)
- Complement: 274
- Armament: Armament (original): 6 × 5 in (130 mm)/38 caliber guns in three twin turrets (two fore, one aft); 12 × 40 mm AA guns; 10 × (2x5) 21 inch (533 mm) torpedo tudes; 1 × depth charge track; Armament (after FRAM): 6 × 5 inch (127 mm)/38 caliber guns in three twin turrets (two fore, one aft); 6 × (2x3) 12.75" (324 mm) torpedo tubes for Mk44-Mk46 torpedoes; 2 × Hedgehog launchers (Mark 11, 24 bombs each); Armament (HN service): 6 × 127 mm (5 inch)/38 caliber guns in three twin turrets (two fore, one aft); 6 × 325 mm (12.75 in.) Anti-Submarine Torpedo tubes (2x3) (for Mk44-Mk46 torpedoes); 2 × Hedgehog launchers (Mark 11, 24 bombs each)
- Aircraft carried: One Alouette III helicopter (hangar and flight deck placed in 1978)

USS Frank Knox (DD-742) was a Gearing-class destroyer which served in the United States Navy from 1944 to 1971. She was then transferred to the Greek Navy and renamed Themistoklis (D-210). The ship was decommissioned in 1992 and finally sunk as a target in 2001.

== History ==
=== 1944-1971 ===
Frank Knox was built at Bath, Maine and was named after Secretary of the Navy Frank Knox. Commissioned in December 1944, she arrived in the western Pacific war zone in mid-June 1945, in time to participate in the final carrier air raids on the Japanese home islands as part of Task Force 38. During the Battle of Okinawa she acted as a radar picket destroyer giving early warnings of incoming air raids. She was present in Tokyo Bay when Japan formally surrendered on 2 September 1945 and remained in the Far East until early February 1946. The ship made additional deployments to the region during the later 1940s and was reclassified as a radar picket destroyer DDR-742, in March 1949.

Frank Knox again steamed across the Pacific to take part in hostilities in early July 1950, shortly after the outbreak of the Korean War. During this combat tour, which lasted into 1951, her missions included support of the Inchon invasion, shelling enemy targets ashore and patrolling the Taiwan Straits. Two more Korean War cruises followed in 1952 and 1953, and for the rest of the decade Frank Knox deployed regularly to WestPac for Seventh Fleet service.

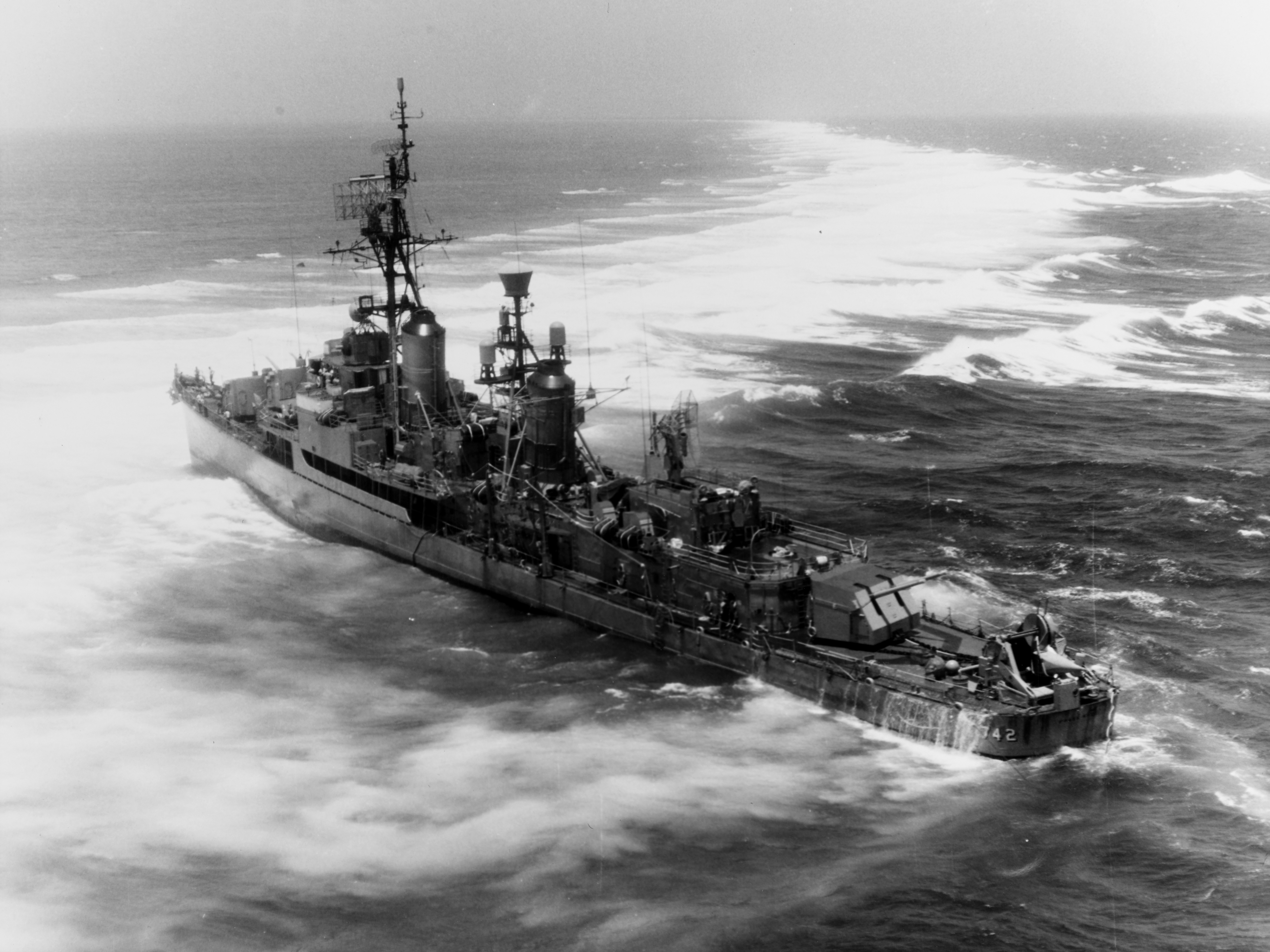
Frank Knox aground on Pratas Reef, in 1965.

In 1960–1961 Frank Knox was modernized under the FRAM II program, which gave her updated radars and other new equipment. She was based in the Far East from late 1961 until mid-1964, then returned home via Australia and the south Pacific. Again deployed in June 1965, she briefly served off Vietnam conducting naval gunfire support and coastal patrol operations. Via Tsoying Naval Base, Taiwan while underway in the South China Sea on 18 July, Frank Knox ran aground on Pratas Reef, and was only freed after a very difficult salvage effort. Though she was badly damaged, and relatively elderly, her command and control capabilities justified an extensive repair job, which was carried out at Yokosuka, Japan, over the next year.

Frank Knox rejoined the active forces in November 1966 and resumed her pattern of nearly all annual Seventh Fleet cruises, frequently taking part in Vietnam combat missions. Redesignated DD-742 at the beginning of 1969, she completed her final deployment in November 1970 and was decommissioned at the end of January 1971.

=== Greek service ===
USS Frank Knox was transferred to the Greek Navy a few days later. Renamed Themistoklis (D210) (from Themistocles Athenian statesman who persuaded Athens to build a navy and then led it to victory over the Persians), she served for another two decades before being placed out of commission in the early 1990s. The ship was sunk as a torpedo target by the Greek Submarine Nireus (S-111) on 12 September 2001.
