= Zeng Fengnian =

Qing dynasty military commander (1809–1885)

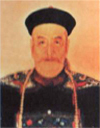
- Native name: 曾逢年
- Born: 1809; Jieshi, Lufeng, Guangdong
- Died: 1885 (aged 75–76) Jieshi, Lufeng, Guangdong
- Allegiance: Qing dynasty
- Service years: 1820s–1863
- Conflicts: Nian Rebellion

Zeng Fengnian (Chinese: 曾逢年; 1809–1885) was a late Qing dynasty military commander from Jieshi, Lufeng, Guangdong. In 1845 he was appointed commander of the Nan'ao Subdistrict garrison, and in 1863 was awarded the peacock plume in recognition of his role in suppressing local rebel forces.

== Biography ==
Zeng entered military service at a young age. He served successively in the Guangdong Xiangshan Association Division, the Yangjiang Town Guerrilla Forces in Guangdong, and under the Governor of Guangdong.

In 1844, on the recommendation of the Viceroy of Min-Zhe, Zeng was appointed by imperial decree to command the Nan'ao Subdistrict garrison. Following a period of filial mourning, he returned to active service in 1849 as garrison commander of Jieshi, Lufeng.

In 1853, the Xianfeng Emperor ordered Zeng to assist in suppressing the Nian Rebellion in Shandong, appointing him commander of the Dengzhou Town garrison. By 1861 he had pacified local rebel activity in the region. That same year he petitioned to resign his commission in order to attend to family matters, but the petition was denied and he was required to remain at his post.

In 1863, Zeng was again deployed by imperial forces, this time to Zichuan District, Shandong, where he successfully quelled rebel activity in the area. In recognition of his service, he was awarded the peacock plume in June of that year. He subsequently returned to his hometown of Jieshi, where he died of natural causes in 1885.

== Sources ==
- 林锦佳; 连凯跃, eds. (2007). 《陆丰县志》 [Lufeng County Chronicle] (in Simplified Chinese). 广州: 广东人民出版社. ISBN 978-7-218-05556-5.
- 《大清穆宗繼天開運受中居正保大定功聖智誠孝信敏恭寬毅皇帝實錄》(清代同治年间) (in Traditional Chinese). Archived from the original on 2016-03-04.
