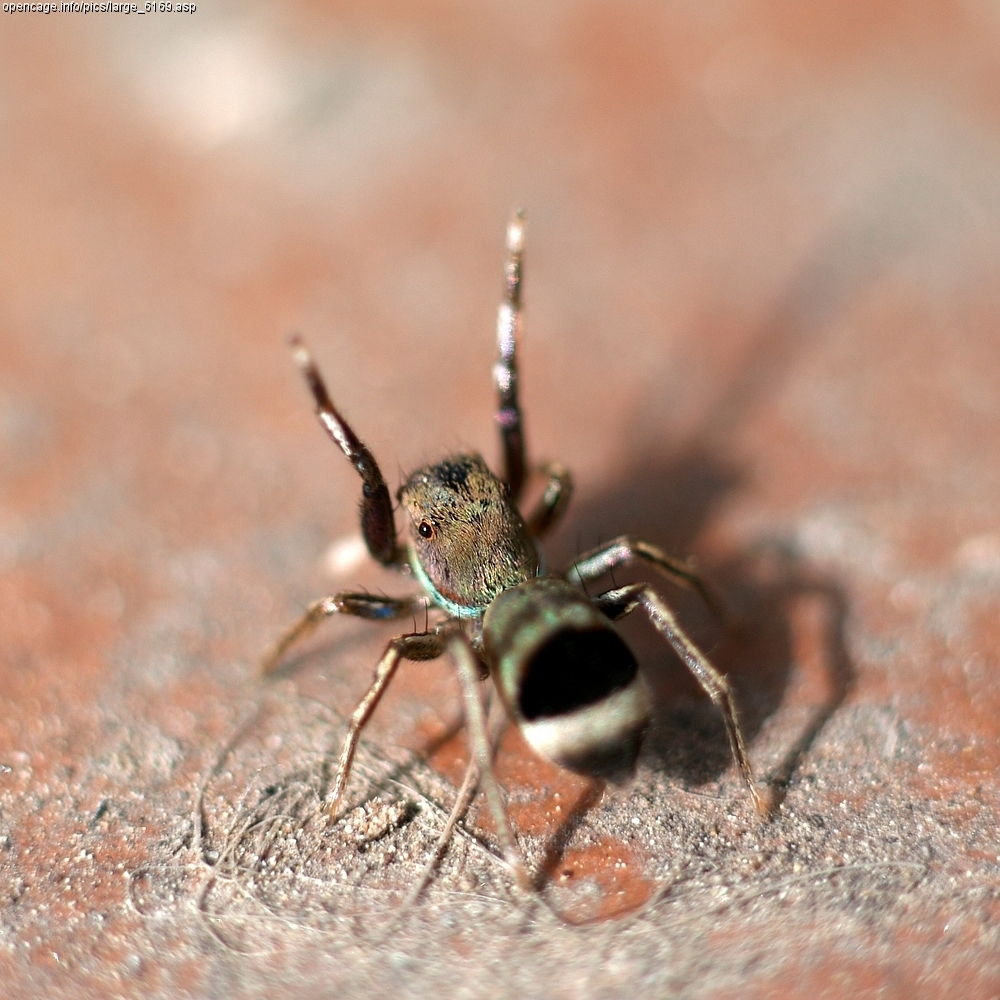
- S. cupreus from Japan

Scientific classification
- Kingdom: Animalia
- Phylum: Arthropoda
- Subphylum: Chelicerata
- Class: Arachnida
- Order: Araneae
- Infraorder: Araneomorphae
- Family: Salticidae
- Subfamily: Salticinae
- Genus: Siler; Simon, 1889

Type species
- S. cupreus Simon, 1889

Species
- 9, see text

Synonyms
- Silerella Strand, 1906

= Siler (spider) =

Genus of spiders

Siler is a genus of Asian jumping spiders that was first described by Eugène Louis Simon in 1889. They specialize in hunting ants.

== Species ==
As of March 2024 it contains twelve species, found only in Asia:

- Siler bielawskii Zabka, 1985 – China, Vietnam
- Siler collingwoodi (O. Pickard-Cambridge, 1871) – China, Japan
- Siler cupreus Simon, 1889 (type) – China, Korea, Taiwan, Japan
- Siler flavocinctus (Simon, 1901) – Singapore
- Siler hanoicus Prószyński, 1985 – Vietnam
- Siler lewaense Prószyński & Deeleman-Reinhold, 2010 – Indonesia (Sumba)
- Siler niser Caleb, Parag & Datta-Roy, 2023 - India
- Siler pulcher Simon, 1901 – Malaysia
- Siler ruber Baba, Yamasaki & Tanikawa, 2019 - Japan
- Siler semiglaucus (Simon, 1901) – India to Philippines
- Siler severus (Simon, 1901) – China
- Siler zhangae Wang & Li, 2020 - China
