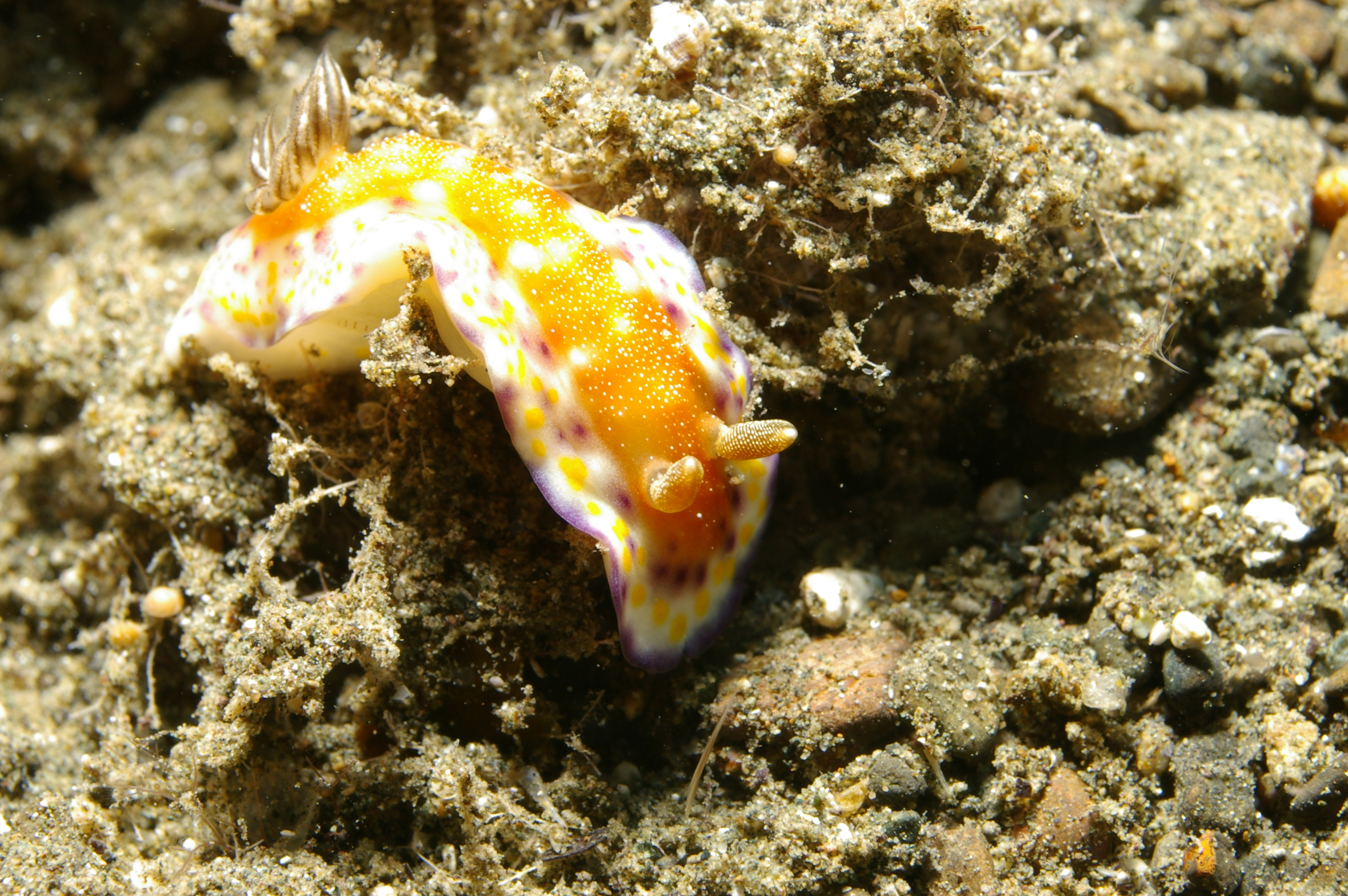
- A Goniobranchus collingwoodi from Papua New Guinea

Scientific classification
- Kingdom: Animalia
- Phylum: Mollusca
- Class: Gastropoda
- Order: Nudibranchia
- Family: Chromodorididae
- Genus: Goniobranchus
- Species: G. collingwoodi

Binomial name
- Goniobranchus collingwoodi (Rudman, 1987)

Synonyms
- Chromodoris collingwoodi Rudman, 1987 (basionym)

= Goniobranchus collingwoodi =

Collingwood's chromodoris

Species of gastropod

Goniobranchus collingwoodi, common name Collingwood's chromodoris, is a species of very colourful sea slug, a dorid nudibranch, a marine gastropod mollusc in the family Chromodorididae.

== Distribution ==
This species was described from New Caledonia. It has been reported from Queensland, New South Wales, Indonesia, Papua New Guinea and Hong Kong.
