= Hong Kong (Area Control Centre) =

Coordinates: 22°18′19.1″N 113°55′18.6″E

Hong Kong (Area Control Centre) (ICAO: VHHK) is one of two key area control centres in the Pearl River Delta and is under the Hong Kong Civil Aviation Department. HK ACC is based out of the control tower at Hong Kong International Airport.

From this ACC, air traffic controllers provide en route and terminal control services to aircraft in the Hong Kong Flight Information Region (FIR). The Hong Kong FIR airspace covers the waters off Hong Kong to the south, southeast and southwest. This does not include the airspace and immediate waters off the mainland China and Macau (under Guangzhou FIR). HK ACC does handle flights in and out of Macau International Airport.

== Aerodrome classes ==
The HKG ACC assumes control of the following classes of airports

- VHHH – Hong Kong International Airport
- VHSK – Shek Kong Airfield
- VHST – Shun Tak Heliport
- HK07 – Central Government Heliport
- VMMC - Macau International Airport
- XZM - Macau Heliport
- RCLM - Dongsha Airport
