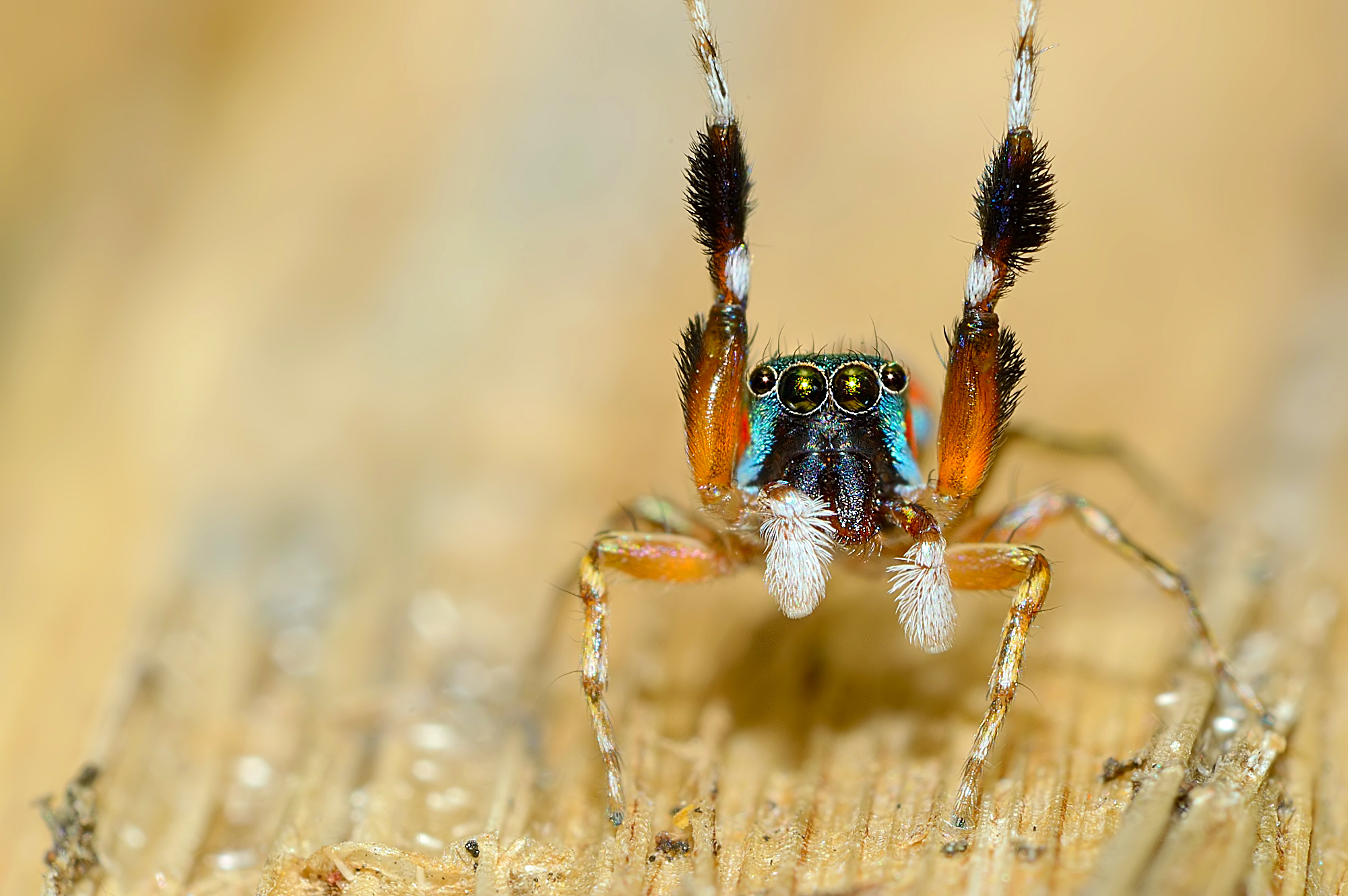

Scientific classification
- Kingdom: Animalia
- Phylum: Arthropoda
- Subphylum: Chelicerata
- Class: Arachnida
- Order: Araneae
- Infraorder: Araneomorphae
- Family: Salticidae
- Genus: Siler
- Species: S. semiglaucus

Binomial name
- Siler semiglaucus (Simon, 1901)

Synonyms
- Cyllobelus semiglaucus Simon, 1901

= Siler semiglaucus =

Species of spider

Siler semiglaucus (jade jumping spider) is a species of spider of the family Salticidae. It is found throughout India to the Philippines.
