= Jieshi, Lufeng =

Coordinates: 22°49′11″N 115°49′33″E

Jieshi Town Chinese: 碣石镇 Kitchioh
- Subdistrict

Chinese transcription(s)
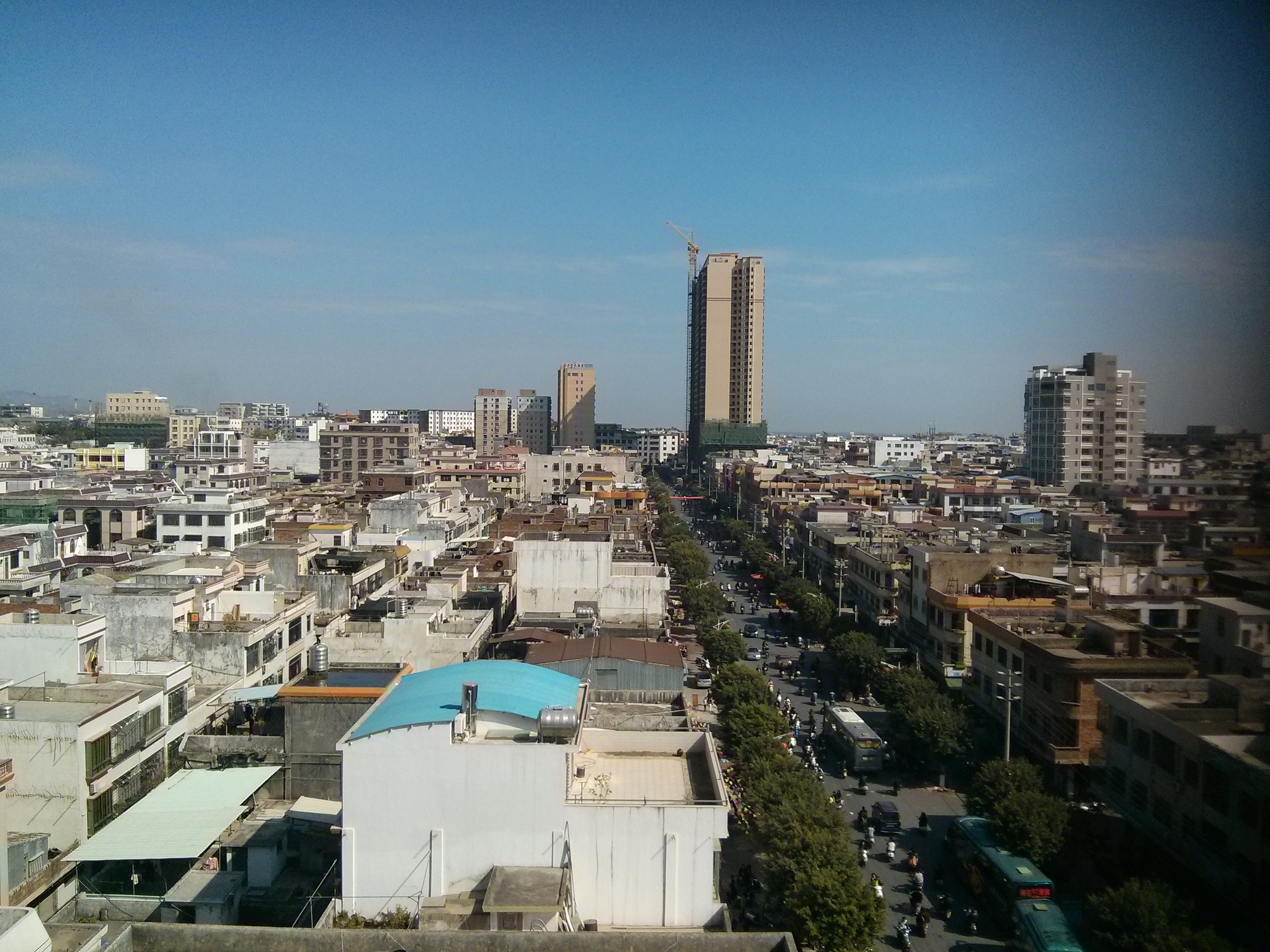
- The main road "JinJiangDaDao" of Jieshi Town
- Interactive map of Jieshi Town
- Country: China
- Province: Guangdong
- Prefecture: Shanwei
- County level city: Lufeng
- Established: 1389

Government
  - Type: Town

Population (2008)
  - Total: 229,971
- Time zone: UTC+8 (China Standard Time)

Jieshi, Lufeng
- Traditional Chinese: 碣石鎮
- Simplified Chinese: 碣石镇
- Postal: Kitchioh
Transcriptions
Standard Mandarin
- Hanyu Pinyin: Jièshí zhèn

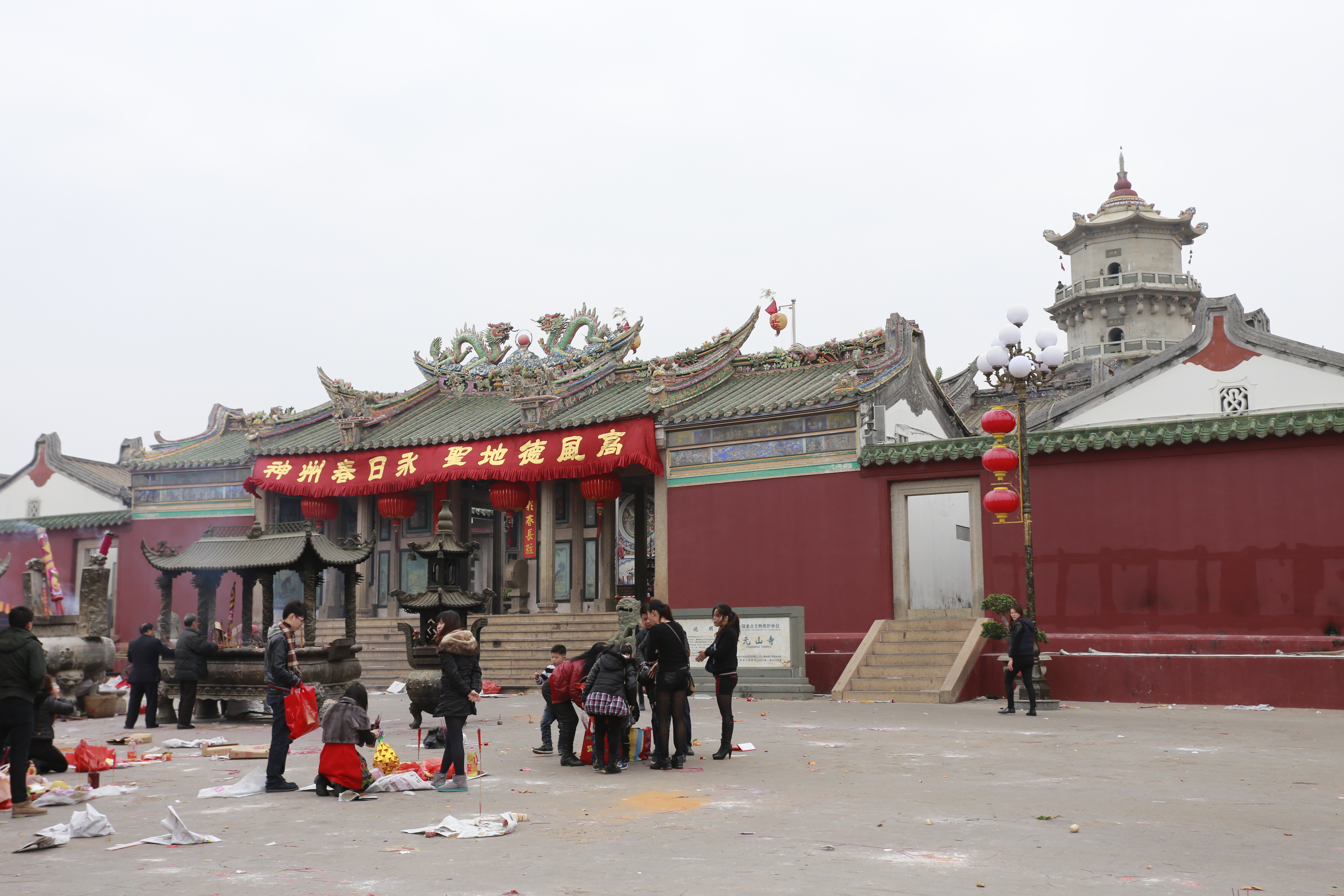
Yuanshan Temple in Jieshi Town.

Jieshi (Chinese: 碣石镇) is a Town in Lufeng, Shanwei Municipality, Guangdong.

The town administers 41 villages.

== Features ==
Yuanshan Temple (元山寺) on Xuanwu Mountain (玄武山) is located in Jieshi Town. Built in 1127, during the Southern Song dynasty, the temple was enlarged in 1577 during the Ming dynasty.

== Feuding Villages ==
Early in 2009, the Jieshi villages of Gangkou and Meitian began contesting the control of a road down to their common seaside. At one point, armed Meitian villagers surrounded Gangkou and attacked. The victims appealed to Jieshi Town executive / Party office to no avail. In April over 400 Gangkou residents boarded 26 fishing boats and sailed for Hong Kong. (The boats were turned back by Hong Kong police after a seven-hour protest near Clear Water Bay).

Meitian also suffered assault. Some villagers posted claims on a local website that their houses had been pelted with bricks, their schoolchildren beaten, a teenager raped (in April). More violence came in October.

On March 7, 2010, late in the evening, Meitian villagers again attacked Gangkou. They hurled rocks, rods, home-made grenades and petrol bombs at Gangkou residences through the night, destroying roofs and windows. All Gangkou residents fled and by morning were camped out before the Jieshi Town govt/party building.

A Gangkou resident surnamed Xu told Nanfang Daily that about 40 people had been injured. Four of them had been hit in the eyes by metal pellets from the grenades, and five elsewhere on the head. Some villagers were taken to City hospital in Donghai.

"We're homeless now. So many of our houses were burned out after we left," Xu said. "We can't go back or else we'll be beaten. We're like refugees."

Jieshi paichusuo (Chinese: 派出所, police substation) sealed off Gangkou village from cars and outsiders. In Donghai, the Lufeng City executive said that Meitian and Gangkou villages had been attacking each other with fire-crackers and that work groups had been sent to investigate.

== Notable people ==
- Zeng Fengnian, 19th century military commander
