= Shenzhen–Shanwei high-speed railway =

High-speed rail line in China

Shenzhen–Shanwei high-speed railway 深汕高速铁路

Overview
- Status: Operating
- Locale: Shenzhen; Huizhou; Shanwei
- Termini: Shenshan; Xili
- Stations: 6

Service
- Operator(s): China Railway Guangzhou Group

Technical
- Line length: 129 km (80 mi)
- Track gauge: 1,435 mm (4 ft 8 1/2 in)
- Operating speed: 350 km/h (217 mph)

The Shenzhen–Shanwei high-speed railway is a high-speed railway currently under construction in Guangdong, China. It is 129 kilometres (80 mi) long and has a design speed of 350 kilometres per hour (220 mph). It is expected to open in 2025.

This railway, combined with the Guangzhou–Shanwei high-speed railway between Shenshan and Shanwei, will provide a faster route between Shanwei and Shenzhen Pingshan than the existing Xiamen–Shenzhen railway. West of Shenzhen Pingshan, it will take a new route into Shenzhen with a new intermediate station, Luohu North, before terminating at Xili railway station.

== History ==
Construction began on 4 January 2021.

== Stations ==
Station Name	Chinese	Metro transfers/connections	Location	
Xili	西丽	13 (under construction) 15 (planned)	Nanshan District	Shenzhen
Luohubei	罗湖北	14	Luohu District	Shenzhen
Shenzhen Pingshan	深圳坪山	16	Pingshan District	Shenzhen
Huiyang	惠阳		Huiyang District	Huizhou
Huidongnan	惠东南		Huidong County	Huizhou
Shenshan	深汕		Haifeng County	Shanwei

== See also ==
- Shenshan
