= Huizhou Pingtan Airport =

Airport in Huizhou, Guangdong, China

Huizhou Pingtan Airport 惠州平潭机场
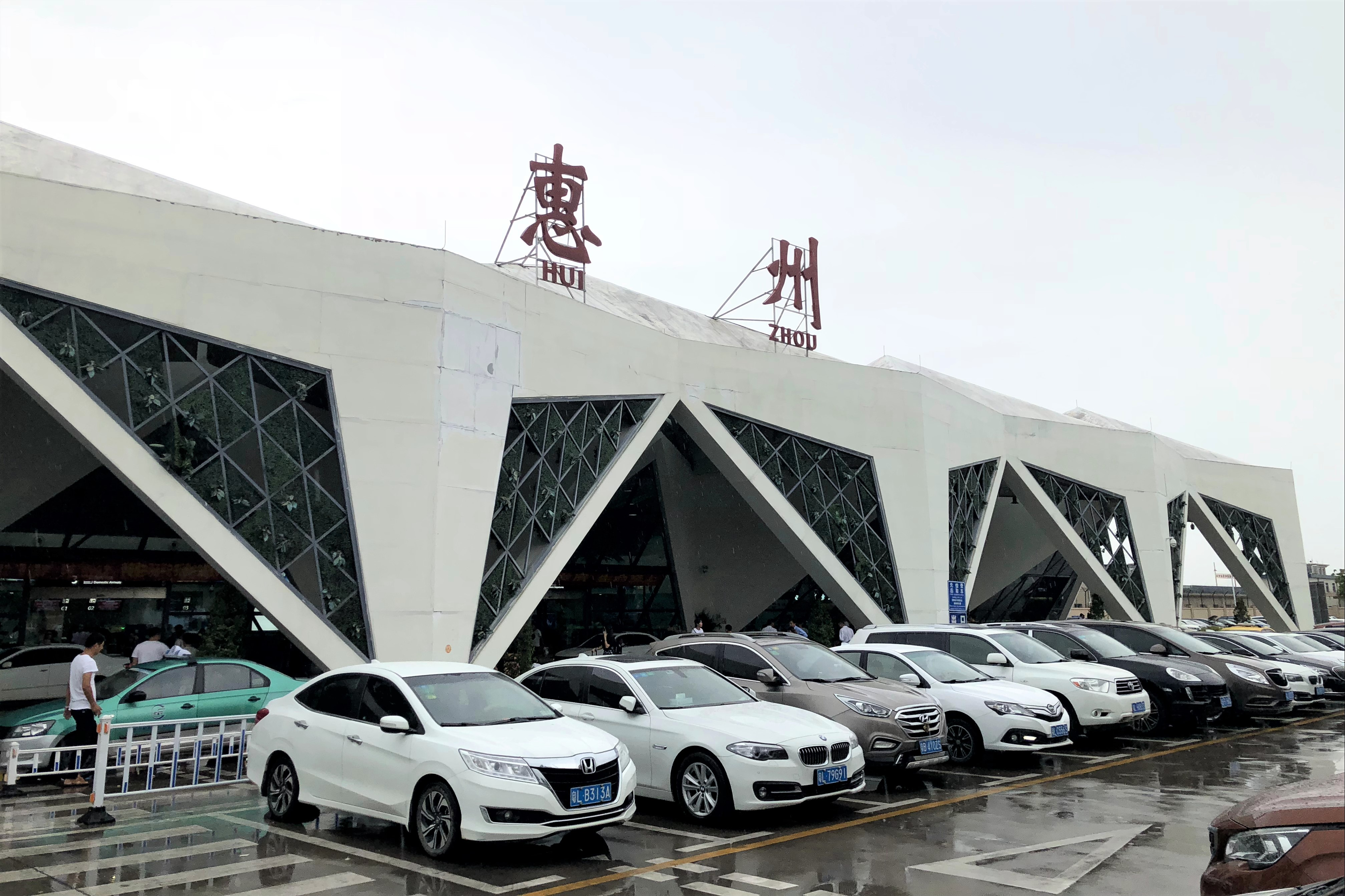
- IATA: HUZ; ICAO: ZGHZ

Summary
- Airport type: Public / military
- Operator: Guangdong Airport Group Co.
- Serves: Huizhou
- Location: Pingtan, Huiyang, Huizhou, Guangdong, China
- Opened: 5 February 2015; 11 years ago
- Coordinates: 23°02′54″N 114°36′01″E
- Website: www.gdhzairport.com

Map
- Location of airport in Guangdong

Runways
Direction	Length		Surface
Direction	m	ft	Surface
09/27	2,400	7,874	Concrete

Statistics (2025)
- Passengers: 3,365,186
- Aircraft movements: 25,638
- Cargo (metric tons): 11,661.4

Huizhou Pingtan Airport
- Simplified Chinese: 惠州平潭机场
- Traditional Chinese: 惠州平潭機場
Transcriptions
Standard Mandarin
- Hanyu Pinyin: Huìzhōu Píngtán Jīchǎng

Huizhou Pingtan Airport (IATA: HUZ, ICAO: ZGHZ) is a dual-use military and civil airport serving the city of Huizhou in South Central China's Guangdong province. It is located in the town of Pingtan in Huiyang District, 20 kilometers from the city center. The military airport served commercial flights between 1985 and 2002, but stopped when the military was forbidden to operate commercial businesses.

In 2025, the airport operated 52 routes, serving 43 destinations across 41 cities. According to the Civil Aviation Administration of China, in 2025, the airport recorded 25,638 flight take-offs and landings, 11,661.4 metric tons of cargo movements, and 3.365 million passenger movements, representing a year-on-year increases of 17.0%, 24.7% and 18.1% respectively.

== History ==
Huizhou Pingtan Airport was first built in February 1953 as Huiyang Pingtan Airport and covered an area of 5,225 mu (畝). It was a second‑class Air Force wartime airfield constructed for national defense. For decades, it served as an important military base and played a key role in air‑defense operations along China's southeastern coast during the 1960s and 1970s. From 1985 to 2002, Huizhou Airport operated civil–military joint flights. During this period, more than a dozen air routes were opened, with over 12,000 aircraft movements and more than one million arriving and departing passengers. These services played a significant role in promoting Huizhou's economic and social development.

In 2002, civil aviation operations were suspended following national policy adjustments that required the military to withdraw from commercial activities.

The airport's reconstruction and expansion project was relaunched in March 2011, when the Guangdong Airport Authority and the Huizhou Municipal Government signed the Framework Agreement on Jointly Promoting the Operation and Development of Huizhou Military–Civil Airport (共同推进惠州军民合用机场运营与发展合作框架协议). On 8 April 2014, the National Development and Reform Commission and the General Staff Department of the PLA jointly approved the feasibility study report for the airport's reconstruction and expansion. Construction began on 25 June 2014. Subsequently, the airport's airfield area passed major milestones including completion acceptance, calibration flights, test flights, and industry inspections. The terminal area also successfully passed both completion acceptance and industry acceptance, paving the way for the resumption of civil aviation operations. The airport was reopened on 5 February 2015.

To meet the rapidly growing demand for passenger throughput and to further enhance Huizhou Airport's operational capacity, the Guangdong Airport Authority launched a major expansion project in 2018. The project included the construction of a new Terminal 2 (T2) building with a floor area of approximately 16,300 m^{2}, the expansion of aircraft stands (bringing the total to eight C‑class stands) and the relocation and reconstruction of the cargo terminal (about 1,800 m^{2}). In June 2018, construction began on the airfield and cargo terminal components of the expansion project, both of which were completed and put into use in November of the same year. In October 2018, work commenced on the T2 terminal building and its supporting facilities. The project passed industry acceptance on 27 August 2019, and Terminal 2 officially entered service on 28 August 2019.

== Airlines and destinations ==
=== Passenger ===
Airlines	Destinations
Air Chang'an	Xi'an
Air China	Beijing–Capital, Chengdu–Tianfu, Shanghai–Pudong, Wuhan
Chengdu Airlines	Chengdu–Tianfu
China Eastern Airlines	Chengdu–Tianfu, Hefei, Jinan, Qingdao, Shanghai–Pudong, Wuhan
China Express Airlines	Lanzhou, Yibin
China Southern Airlines	Wuhan
China United Airlines	Beijing–Daxing, Chengdu–Tianfu, Shanghai–Pudong
Chongqing Airlines	Chongqing, Chengdu–Tianfu, Nanchong
Colorful Guizhou Airlines	Ningbo
Juneyao Air	Changchun, Guiyang, Hangzhou, Harbin, Nanjing, Shanghai–Pudong, Wuxi, Xi'an, Xishuangbanna
Kunming Airlines	Kunming
LJ Air	Changzhou, Harbin, Jining, Luoyang, Taiyuan
Shenzhen Airlines	Shenyang, Wuxi, Xi'an, Yangzhou, Zhengzhou
Sichuan Airlines	Chengdu–Tianfu, Kunming
Tianjin Airlines	Changde, Changsha, Chongqing, Guiyang, Haikou, Hechi, Luzhou, Nanchong, Nanjing, Shijiazhuang, Xi'an, Xingyi, Urumqi, Wanzhou, Yancheng, Yichang, Yinchuan, Yulin, Zhengzhou
West Air	Chongqing, Zhengzhou

=== Cargo ===
Airlines	Destinations
YTO Cargo Airlines	Jiaxing

== See also ==
- List of airports in China
- List of the busiest airports in China
- List of People's Liberation Army Air Force airbases
