= Pinghai Ancient City =

Historic town in Guangdong, China

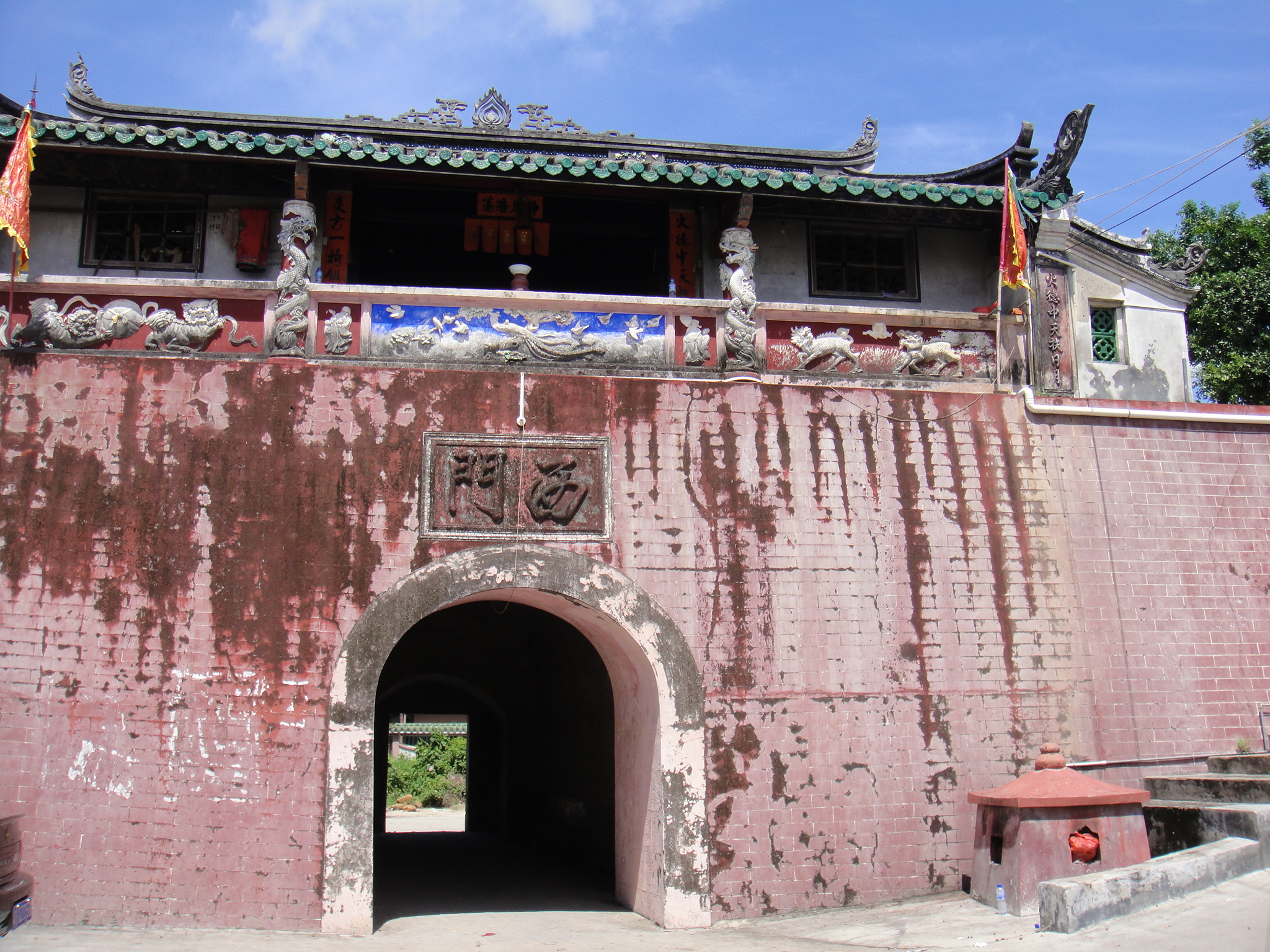
West Gate of Pinghai Ancient City

Pinghai Ancient City (Chinese: 平海古城) is a historic town in southern Renping Peninsula, Huidong County, Huizhou, Guangdong, China. It was established in year 1385. Currently, much of its defense walls and houses along with four of its gatehouses, still remain intact. A number of forts were constructed around the town.
