= Howard W. French =

American journalist

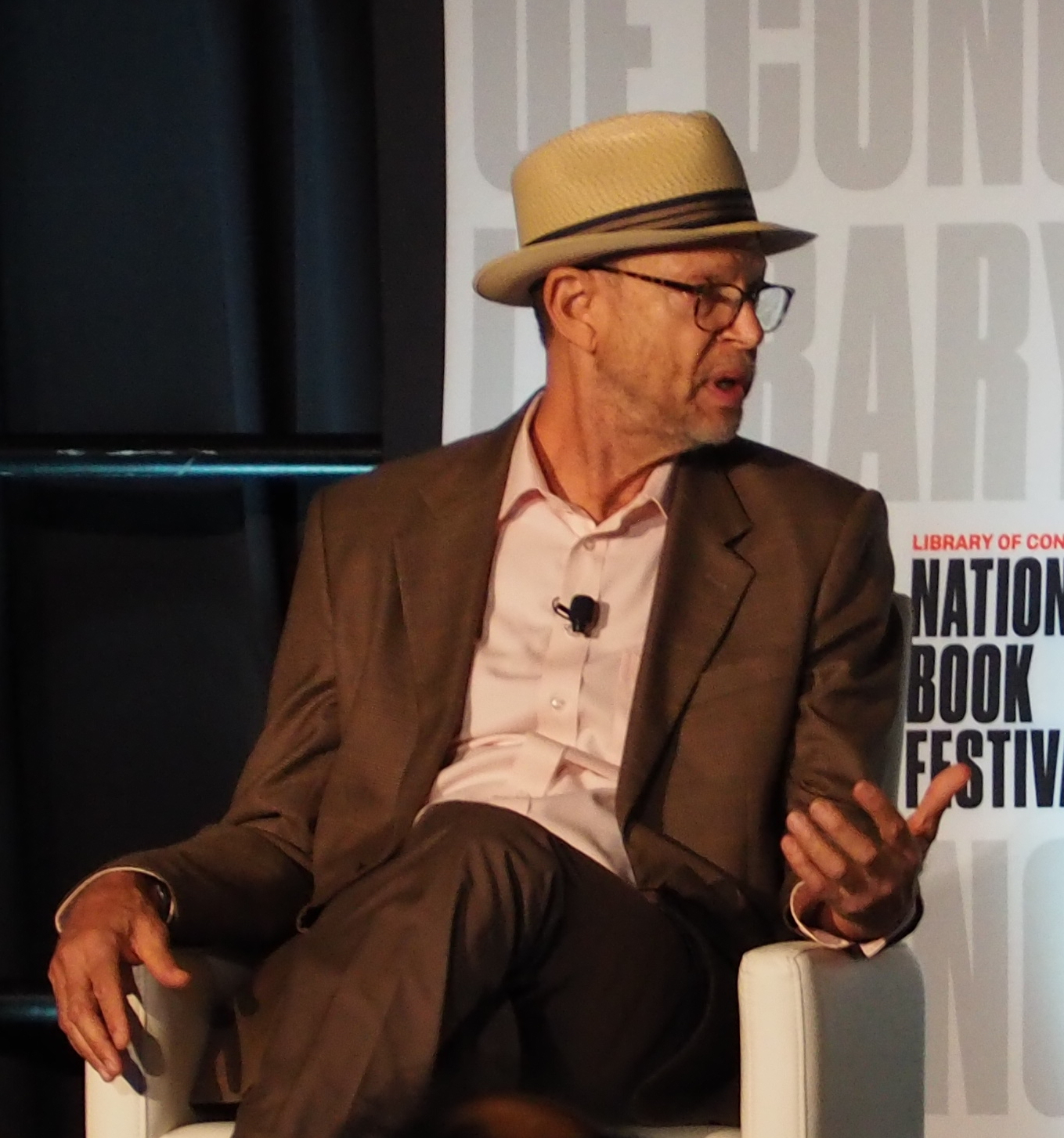
- Born: Howard Waring French; October 14, 1957 (age 69); Washington, D.C., U.S.
- Occupations: Journalist, author, photographer, professor
- Employer: Columbia University Graduate School of Journalism
- Notable credit(s): The New York Times; Born in Blackness (2021)
- Spouse: Agnès French
- Website: www.howardwfrench.com

Howard Waring French (born October 14, 1957) is a US-American journalist, author and photographer. Since 2008 he has been a professor at the Columbia University Graduate School of Journalism. Prior to re-entering academia, French was a longtime foreign correspondent and senior writer with The New York Times.

== Biography ==
Howard W. French was a university instructor in the Ivory Coast in the 1980s, before becoming a journalist. He has reported extensively on the political affairs of Western and Central Africa. These reports were the basis for his 2004 book, A Continent for the Taking.

French joined The New York Times in 1986 and served as its bureau chief for the Caribbean and Central America from 1990 to 1994, covering Haiti, Cuba, Nicaragua, El Salvador, and numerous other countries. He was one of the newspaper's first black correspondents.

From 1994 to 1998, French covered West and Central Africa for the Times, reporting on wars in Liberia, Sierra Leone, and Central Africa, with particular attention to the fall of the longtime dictator of Zaire, Mobutu Sese Seko.

In 1999, French succeeded Nicholas D. Kristof as Tokyo bureau chief for the Times, covering Japan and the Koreas until 2003. To prepare for the job, he spent a year studying Japanese at the University of Hawaiʻi at Mānoa. From 2003 to 2008, he was the Shanghai bureau chief. He reported on the political and social affairs of China, including the growth of civil society, the government crackdown on dissent in the Dongzhou protests of 2005, and the Sichuan earthquake of 2008. In addition to his native English, he speaks Mandarin, French, Spanish, and Japanese.

French has written frequently for The New York Review of Books and also contributed to The Atlantic and other publications, including writing "longreads" articles for The Guardian. Besides his reporting for The New York Times, French has authored a weekly column on regional affairs for the International Herald Tribune, and another weekly column on international affairs for Foreign Policy.

Among his five books, French is best known for the award-winning Born in Blackness: Africa, Africans, and the Making of the Modern World, 1471 to the Second World War (Liveright, 2021). The book challenges previous scholarship by giving Africans a more significant role as "prime movers" in the history of the Western World since the 15th century. His 2025 book, The Second Emancipation: Nkrumah, Pan-Africanism, and Global Blackness at High Tide (Liveright, 2025) was named as one of the best non-fiction books of 2025 by Publishers Weekly. His previous book was Everything Under the Heavens: How China's Past Helps Shape its Push for Global Power (Knopf, 2017).

French is also an internationally exhibited documentary photographer. His multi-year project, "Disappearing Shanghai", captured the rapidly shrinking old quarters of Shanghai. The exhibit was shown in Asia, Europe and the U.S. A book containing this work, Disappearing Shanghai: Photographs and Poems of an Intimate Way of Life, was published in 2012, in collaboration with the novelist and poet Qiu Xiaolong.

In 2025, French was elected as a member of the American Academy of Arts and Sciences. French is a member of the board of the Columbia Journalism Review and past president of IRIN (since renamed The New Humanitarian), a non-profit news agency based in Geneva that focuses on the humanitarian sector.

Fellowships:

- 1999: Jefferson Fellow, East-West Society, Honolulu, Hawaii
- 2011: Open Societies Foundation fellow

Honors

- 2025: Elected as a member of the American Academy of Arts and Sciences
- 2022: Winner, Massachusetts African American History Museum Stone Book Award for Born in Blackness
- 2022: Winner, Hurston/Wright Award for Non-Fiction for Born in Blackness
- 2016: Professor of the Year, Columbia University Graduate School of Journalism
- 2005: Finalist, Hurston-Wright Award for Non-Fiction for A Continent for the Taking: The Tragedy and Hope of Africa
- 2004: Honorary Doctorate - University of Maryland, for commentary on East Asia

== Works ==
=== Books ===
- A Continent for the Taking: The Tragedy and Hope of Africa, Knopf, 2004. ISBN 978-0375414619
- Disappearing Shanghai: Photographs and Poems of an Intimate Way of Life with Qiu Xiaolong, Homa & Sekey 2012. ISBN 978-1931907811
- China's Second Continent: How a Million Migrants are Building a New Empire in Africa, Knopf 2014. ISBN 978-0307946652
- Everything Under the Heavens: How the Past Helps Shape China's Push for Global Power, Alfred A. Knopf, 2017. ISBN 978-0385353328
- Born in Blackness: Africa, Africans, and the Making of the Modern World, 1471 to the Second World War, Liveright, 2021. ISBN 978-1631495830
- The Second Emancipation: Nkrumah, Pan-Africanism, and Global Blackness at High Tide, Liveright, 2025. ISBN 978-1324092452

=== Articles ===
- Howard W. French, "A Damn Nuisance" (review of Stuart A. Reid, The Lumumba Plot: The Secret History of the CIA and a Cold War Assassination, Knopf, 2023, 618 pp.; Andrée Blouin in collaboration with Jean MacKellar, My Country, Africa: Autobiography of the Black Pasionaria, Verso, 288 pp.; Soundtrack to a Coup d'Etat, a documentary film directed by Johann Grimonprez), The New York Review of Books, vol. LXXII, no. 14 (25 September 2025), pp. 34–36. Lumumba "was overthrown and murdered ... because he came up against forces that were far too powerful for him to overcome. Belgium, driven by avarice and national pride, and the US, driven by paranoia about Soviet expansionism, were irremediably hostile to African leaders who sought to preserve a degree of nonalignment, used progressive rhetoric, and spoke defiantly and proudly about Africa's rightful place in the world." (p. 36.)
