= Houmen railway station =

Railway station in Shanwei, China

Houmen 鲘门
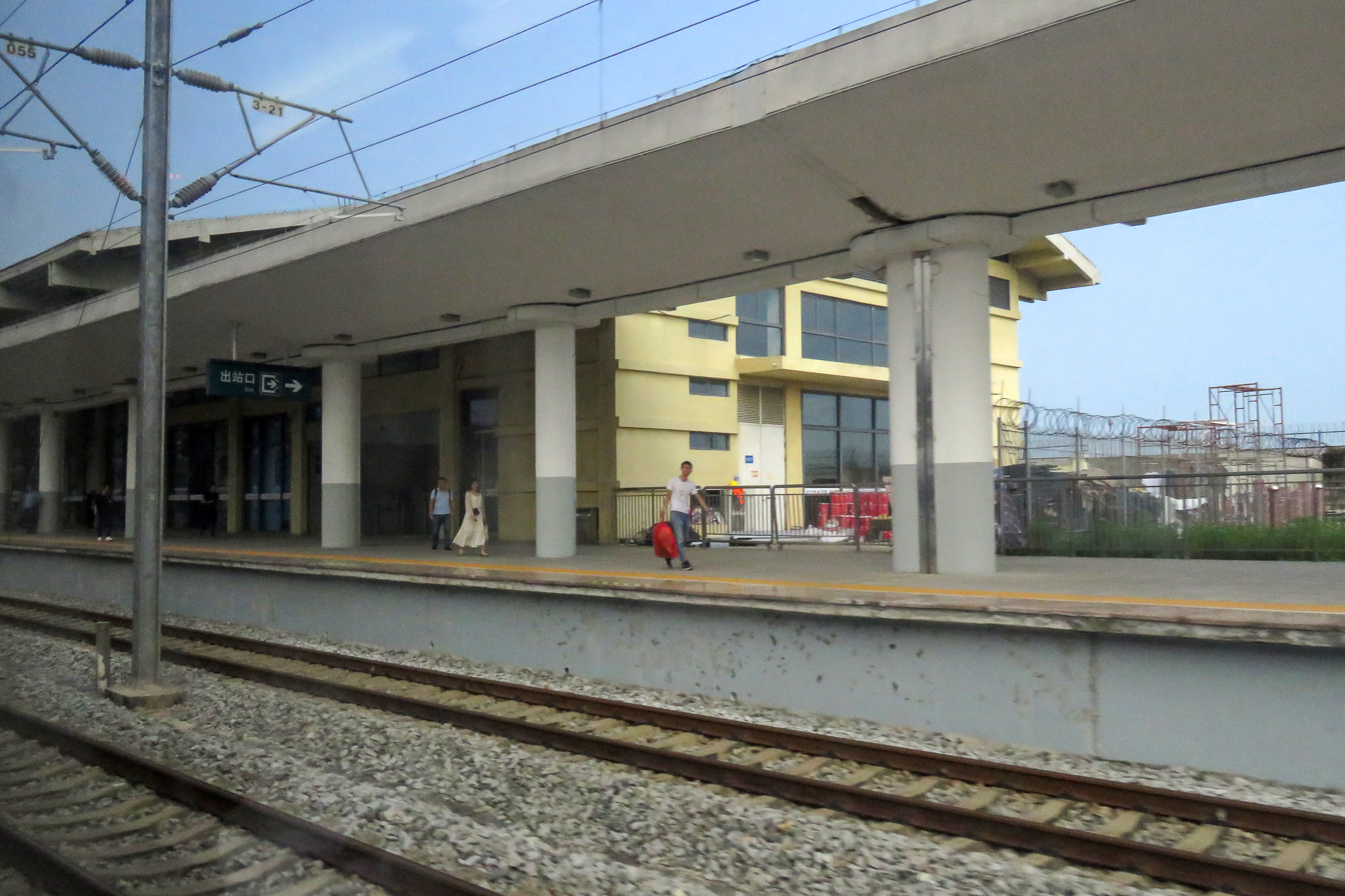

General information
- Location: Haifeng County, Shanwei, Guangdong Province; China
- Operator: China Railway Guangzhou Group, China Railway Corporation
- Line: Xiamen–Shenzhen railway
Location

Houmen (simplified Chinese: 鲘门站; traditional Chinese: 鮜門站; pinyin: Hòumén zhàn) is a railway station located in Haifeng County, Shanwei City, Guangdong Province, China, on the Xiamen-Shenzhen Railway operated by the China Railway Guangzhou Group.

Preceding station	China Railway High-speed	Following station
Shanwei towards Xiamen North	Xiamen–Shenzhen railway	Huidong South towards Shenzhen North
