= Dongzhou protests =

2005 protests in Dongzhou, China

- Part of human rights in the People's Republic of China
- Date: 2005–2006
- Location: Dongzhou (东洲街道)
- Caused by: Land grabs in China

Parties
Local farmers and residents	People's Armed Police

Casualties
- Deaths: 3
- Injuries: 8
- Charged: 19

The Dongzhou protests refers to a series of protests that took place for seven months until December 2005 in Dongzhou (东洲), a subdistrict in Shanwei prefecture, Guangdong Province, China. The protests were organized in opposition to government plans to partially infill the bay and build a new power plant. It resulted in the shooting deaths of several residents in the night of 6 December 2005 by the People's Armed Police. The death toll is unknown, with different sources mentioning anywhere from three to several dozen deaths. The protests resumed in November 2006.

== Incident ==
The protests were held because local farmers were dissatisfied with the lack of compensation for land expropriated for the construction of the plant. They were also reportedly concerned with the potential for harmful pollution affecting their crops, while fishermen felt their livelihood would be adversely affected by the modifications to the bay.

According to Xinhua, the Information Office of the government of Shanwei described the incident as "serious violation of law", in which Huang Xijun, Lin Hanru and Huang Xirang led protesters in attacking police with knives, petrol bombs, and other explosive devices. Xinhua reported that the police fired warning shots but, in the confusion after nightfall, people were hit by mistake.

Local villagers denied these accounts and reported that the protesters may have used ordinary fireworks as part of their protest. Villagers also alleged that the authorities had "enlisted thugs from local organized crime groups to help put down the demonstration" in addition to regular security forces.

The subdistrict was sealed off by government forces who were searching for suspects involved in the violence and preventing people from leaving the subdistrict.

== Casualties ==
The official New China News Agency reported that three people had been killed and eight others injured in the incident. The Guangzhou Daily Newspaper identified the dead as 26-year-old Lin Yidui, 35-year-old Jiang Guangge and 31-year-old Wei Jin.

There were reports that local authorities refused to return bodies to families, in some cases offering money to residents instead so that they would stop asking for the bodies. It was also reported that on 9 December, many residents held incense sticks and knelt in front of police barricades in the subdistrict, asking for the bodies of their loved ones for proper burial. These requests were refused. The South China Morning Post quoted some residents who said that the officials were attempting to hide the death toll.

== Aftermath ==
On 11 December 2005, the Chinese government announced that a police commander was detained for mishandling the protest and causing deaths and injuries. Ta Kung Pao reported on 13 December that, according to the Shanwei TV Station via Agence France Presse, Wu Sheng, the vice director of the Shanwei Police Department, was placed in criminal detention by procurator bureau for mishandling the event. According to local television via The Washington Post, nine residents were also arrested.

The news was followed closely by Hong Kong, Taiwan, dissident Chinese, and overseas media, but received lesser coverage in mainland China media.

In June 2006, The New York Times reported that 19 residents had been prosecuted for the unrest, 7 being given long sentences for disturbing public order and using explosives against the Police. This was taken to be evidence of the Chinese government covering up the true nature of the shootings. The trial was not widely reported on and locals said that they were constantly being pressured not to talk about what happened in 2005. Construction work resumed on the plant after the protests ended, with no compensation being handed out. No public investigation of the shootings has been carried out either.

In November 2006, the BBC reported that tension was again mounting in Dongzhou. The report stated that residents had taken eight local officials hostage after a resident was detained. Two days later, Radio Free Asia reported that the officials had been released following a dawn raid by police, but more residents had been detained. Shortly after, a similar event took place at another village in Guangdong, where residents attempted to detain officials in a dispute over compensation for loss of farm land.

== See also ==
- Human rights in the People's Republic of China
- Siege of Wukan (2011), some 25 km to the northeast
