= Huangshatang High Bridge =

Ancient stone bridge in Huidong, Huizhou, Guangdong, China

Coordinates: 22.9796°N 114.6304°E

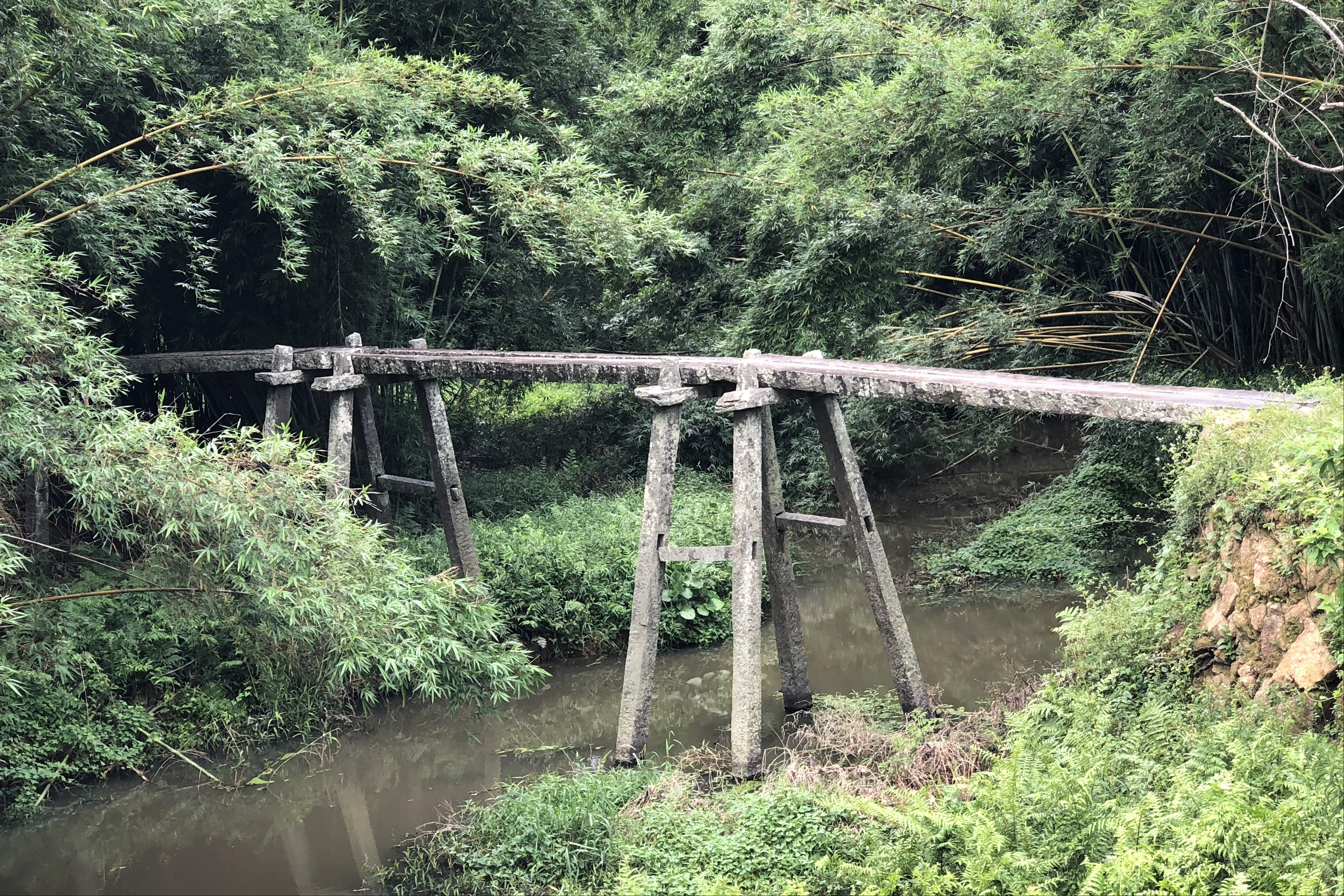
Huangshatang High Bridge, listed as a Historical and Cultural Site Protected at the Provincial Level in Guangdong

Huangshatang High Bridge is a stone bridge located at Tantang Village, Baihua Town, Huidong County, Guangdong. According to Wu Xuhui, the president of Huidong County Museum, the bridge was built in the middle of Qing Dynasty. It was the only bridge on the Tangli River, dovetail boats with spars of 4 – 5 meters could pass under the bridge. But as the effects of riverbed deposition, now parts of its piers are underwater.

The bridge is east–west direction, and was built purely by granitic rocks. The deck has a length of 21.57 meters, and is 3.8 meters above the river, only one person can pass through it at a time. The pier has a shape like the letter "A", and was composed with four 0.17×0.24m long stone pillars.
