= Shenshan =

Shenshan Special Cooperation Zone 深汕特别合作区
- Special cooperation zone
- Country: People's Republic of China
- Province: Guangdong
- Prefecture-level city: Shanwei, Shenzhen
- County: Haifeng County
- Established: 18 February 2011
- Administrative seat: 3 Dade Road, Ebu Subdistrict

Area
  - Total: 468.3 km^{2} (180.8 sq mi)

Population (2020)
  - Total: 65,663
  - Density: 140.2/km^{2} (363.2/sq mi)
- Postal code: 518200
- Area code: 755
- Website: www.szss.gov.cn

Shenshan Special Cooperation Zone (Chinese: 深汕特别合作区, abbreviated as Shenshan) is a coastal area in South China, established on 18 February 2011, and owns administrative authority at the prefecture-level city level, with a total area of 468.3 square kilometers. Its jurisdiction includes Ebu Subdistrict (鹅埠街道), Xiaomo Subdistrict (小漠街道), Houmen Subdistrict (鲘门街道), and Chishi Subdistrict (赤石街道) in Haifeng County, Shanwei, Guangdong. The Administrative Committee is based in Ebu Subdistrict.

== Geography ==
To the west and north it borders Huidong County of Huizhou, to the east it connects with Haifeng County of Shanwei, and to the south it faces Honghai Bay.

== Transportation ==
- Shenzhen–Shanwei high-speed railway
