= Guangzhou–Shanwei high-speed railway =

High-speed rail line in China

Guangzhou–Shanwei railway 广汕铁路

Overview
- Status: Operational
- Locale: Guangzhou, Huizhou & Shanwei, Guangdong
- Termini: Guangzhoudong; Shanwei
- Stations: 8

Service
- Operator(s): China Railway Guangzhou Group

History
- Opened: 26 September 2023

Technical
- Line length: 206.2 km (128.1 mi)
- Number of tracks: 2
- Track gauge: 1,435 mm (4 ft 8 1/2 in)
- Electrification: 25 kV 50 Hz AC
- Operating speed: 350 km/h (217 mph)

Guangzhou–Shanwei railway (simplified Chinese: 广汕铁路; traditional Chinese: 廣汕鐵路; pinyin: Guǎngshàn Tiělù) is a high-speed railway line in Guangdong Province, China. Its design speed is 350 kilometres per hour (220 mph). The railway would shorten the journey time between Guangzhou and Shanwei to one hour by avoiding Shenzhen.

== History ==
Construction of the line began on 5 July 2017. It opened on 26 September 2023.

== Services ==
The services uses the Guangzhou–Shenzhen railway between Guangzhou East and Guangzhou Xintang. A new line was constructed with a design speed of 250 km/h (155 mph) between Guangzhou Xintang (then Xintang) and Zengcheng. The rest of the line between Zengcheng and Shanwei has a design speed of 350 km/h (217 mph).

== Stations ==
Station Name	Chinese	Metro transfers/connections
Guangzhou Xintang	广州新塘	13
Zengcheng	增城	
Luofushan	罗浮山	
Boluo	博罗	
Huizhou South	惠州南	
Huidong	惠东	
Shenshan (U/C)	深汕	
Shanwei	汕尾	
