= Renping Peninsula =

Peninsula in Guangdong, China

Renping Peninsula (Chinese: 稔平半岛) is a peninsula between Daya Bay and Honghai Bay, Huidong County, Huizhou, Guangdong, China. It has a size of 742km^{2}, and has a coastline 171.8 km long.

== See also ==
- Dapeng Peninsula
- Pinghai Ancient City
