= Chengqu, Shanwei =

Chengqu 城区
- District
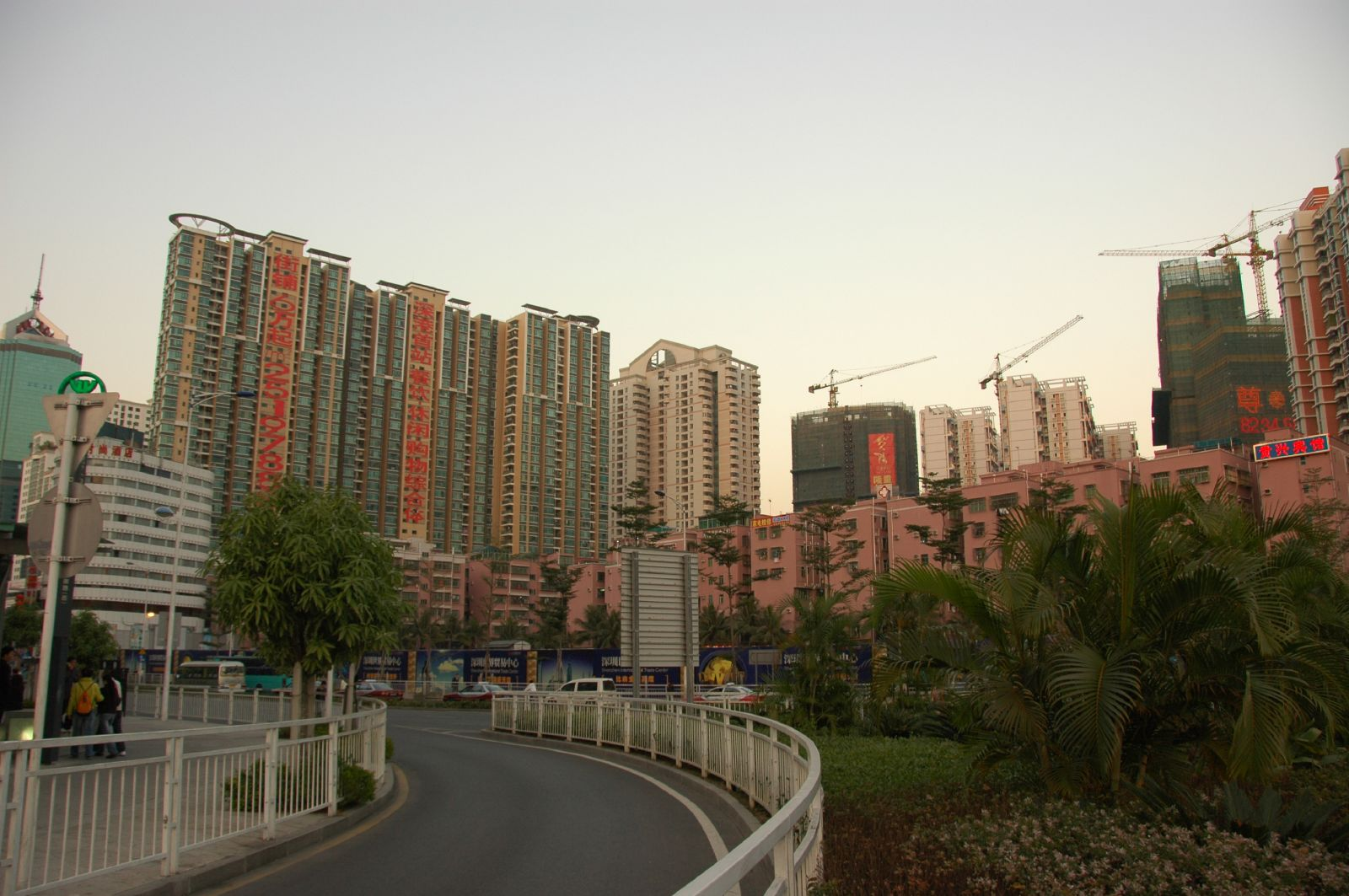

- Location in Guangdong
- Coordinates (Chengqu government): 22°46′44″N 115°21′53″E
- Country: People's Republic of China
- Province: Guangdong
- Prefecture-level city: Shanwei

Area
  - Total: 421 km^{2} (163 sq mi)
- Time zone: UTC+8 (China Standard)

Chengqu (simplified Chinese: 城区; traditional Chinese: 城區; Pe̍h-ōe-jī: Siâⁿ-khu; pinyin: Chéng Qū; lit. 'Urban District') is a district of Shanwei, Guangdong Province, People's Republic of China.

The district includes Shanwei's central urban area, as well as nearby towns and localities, such as Dongzhou.

The People's Republic of China claims the Pratas Islands (东沙群岛) as part of Chengqu. The island is part of Cijin District, Kaohsiung, Taiwan (ROC).
