= Huidong South railway station =

Railway station in Guangdong Province, China

Coordinates: 22.8475°N 114.7896°E

Huidong South 惠东南
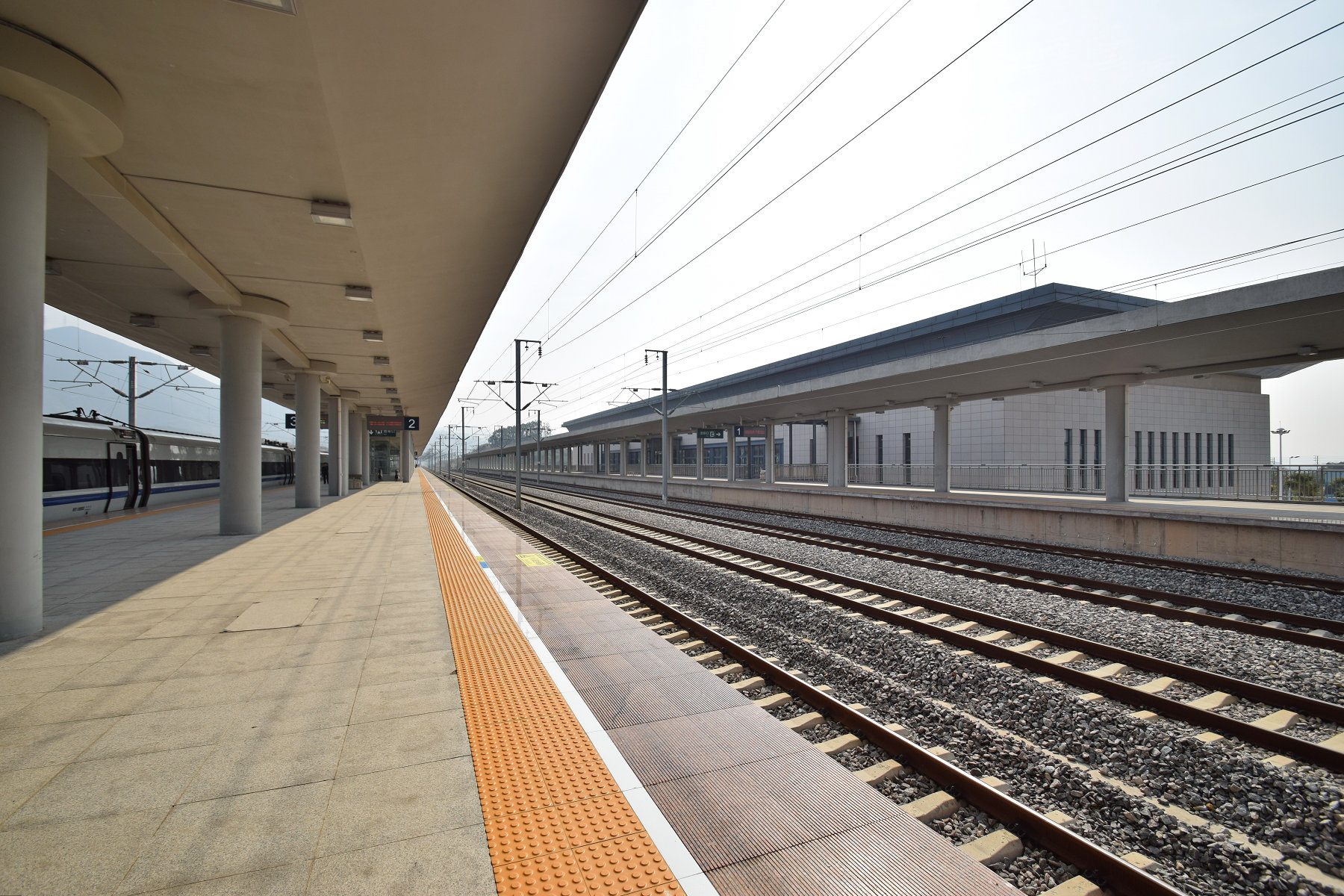

General information
- Location: Huidong, Huizhou, Guangdong; China
- Operated by: China Railway Guangzhou Group, China Railway Corporation
- Line(s): Xiamen–Shenzhen railway Shenzhen–Shanwei high-speed railway (under construction)

Huidong South railway station (Chinese: 惠东南站; pinyin: Huìdōng Nán zhàn), formerly known as Huidong railway station (Chinese: 惠东站; pinyin: Huìdōng zhàn) before April 2023, is a railway station located in Huidong County, Huizhou City, Guangdong Province, China, on the Xiamen–Shenzhen railway operated by the China Railway Guangzhou Group, China Railway Corporation.

Preceding station	China Railway High-speed	Following station
Houmen towards Xiamen North	Xiamen–Shenzhen railway	Huiyang towards Shenzhen North
