= Nanchong Gaoping Airport =

Nanchong Gaoping Airport 南充高坪机场
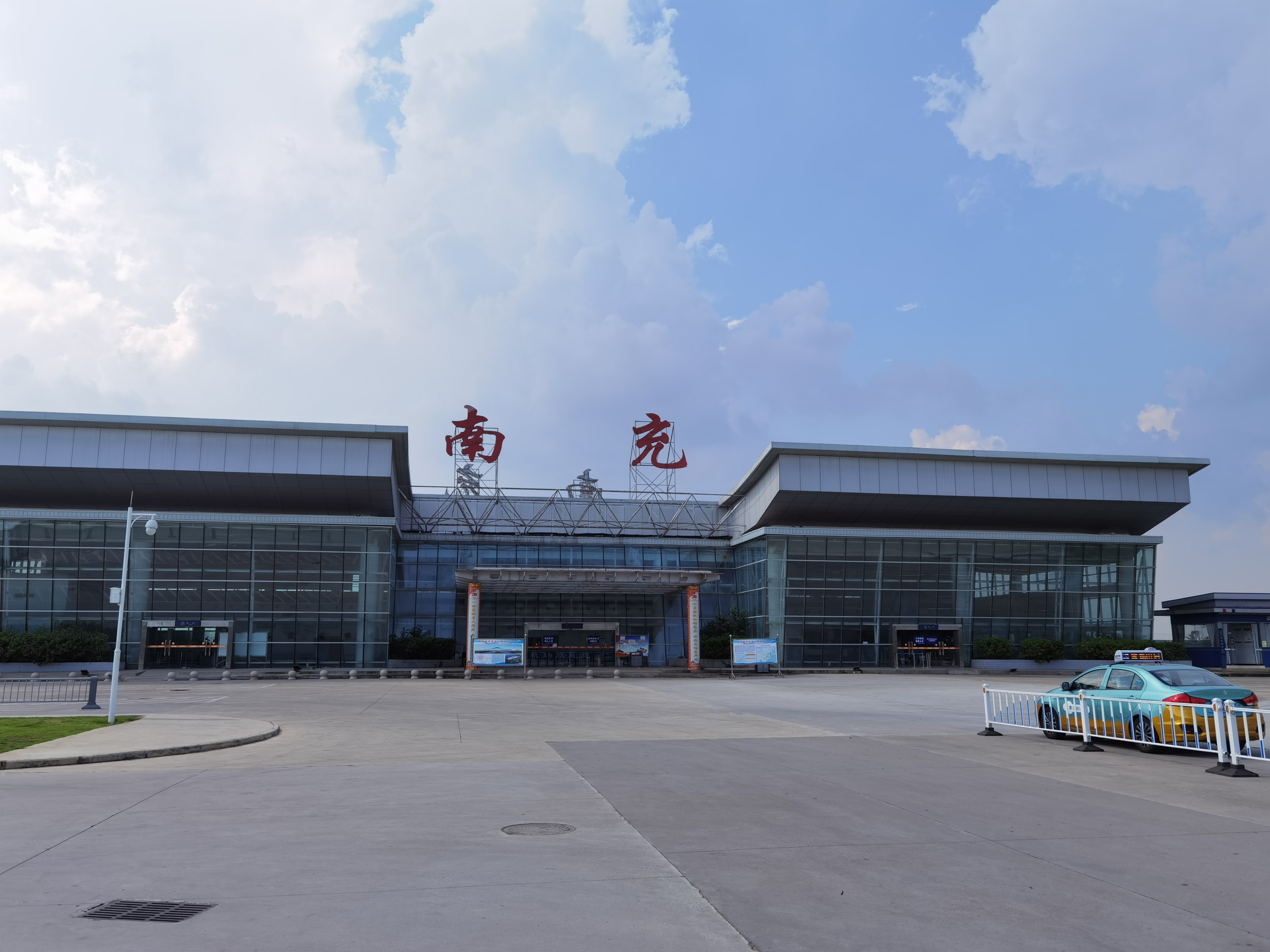
- IATA: NAO; ICAO: ZUNC

Summary
- Airport type: Public
- Location: Nanchong, Sichuan
- Coordinates: 30°47′38″N 106°09′35″E

Map
- Location of airport in Sichuan

Runways
Direction	Length		Surface
Direction	m	ft	Surface
06/24	2,400	7,874	Concrete

Statistics (2025)
- Passengers: 1,073,038
- Aircraft movements: 16,002
- Cargo (metric tons): 2,480.3

Nanchong Gaoping Airport
- Simplified Chinese: 南充高坪机场
- Traditional Chinese: 南充高坪機場
Transcriptions
Standard Mandarin
- Hanyu Pinyin: Nánchōng Gāopíng Jīchǎng

Nanchong Gaoping Airport (IATA: NAO, ICAO: ZUNC) is the airport serving the city of Nanchong in Sichuan province, China.

== History ==
In 1941, Nanchong Huohua Airport was completed, then named Nanchong Duweiba Airport, covering an area of 806,000 square meters. At that time, it was a military airport, but it was not put into operation. In 1958, Nanchong Huohua Airport was converted into a civilian airport, and routes and flights from Nanchong to Chengdu, Daxian and Chongqing were opened one after another.

In April 1961, conditions at the airport were extremely difficult, with only 14 staff members. Lacking night-flight equipment, staff used dozens of kerosene lamps along both sides of the runway, placing one every 50 meters to ensure safe takeoffs and landings at night. The airport used two types of aircraft: the Li-2 and the Yun-5, with the Yun-5 seating 12. Aircraft were primarily used for passenger transport; cargo transport relied on requesting extra flights or using training aircraft, mainly carrying silk from Nanchong.

The airport was closed in 1983; it reopened after expansion in February 1989; and it was closed again in April 1999.

In September 1993, the State Planning Commission approved the feasibility study report for the relocation project of Nanchong Huohua Airport.

The relocation was approved and construction of the new airport officially began in March 2002, with a total investment of approximately 250 million yuan. Built to 4C standards, the airport features a 2,400-meter-long and 45-meter-wide runway, capable of accommodating the normal takeoff and landing needs of aircraft such as the Boeing 737 and Airbus A320. The airport was completed in May 2004, and its maiden flight took place on May 15th. The airport was officially named Nanchong Gaoping Airport and Nanchong Huohua Airport officially retired from the historical stage.

The second phase of the expansion and renovation project of Nanchong Gaoping Airport was launched in 2011 and completed on December 27, 2019. The main projects included the construction of a new T2 terminal building with an area of 10,000 square meters; the addition of 3 boarding bridges, ending the history of Nanchong Airport without boarding bridges; and the expansion of the apron with 2 Class C aircraft stands. The total investment for the project was 848 million yuan.

Nanchong Gaoping International Airport is currently undergoing its third phase of expansion and renovation project, with a total investment of approximately 1.05 billion yuan. The project is expected to be fully completed by September 30, 2026. The project includes a new Terminal 3 (T3) with an area of approximately 26,000 square meters, increasing the number of aircraft stands to 12 Category C stands, and adding one vertical connecting taxiway.

== Airlines and destinations ==
Airlines	Destinations
Air China	Wenzhou
China Eastern Airlines	Kunming, Shanghai–Pudong
China Southern Airlines	Beijing–Daxing, Guangzhou, Shenzhen
Chongqing Airlines	Huizhou
GX Airlines	Qingdao
Hainan Airlines	Beihai, Lanzhou
Tianjin Airlines	Huizhou, Yulin (Shaanxi)
Urumqi Air	Jieyang, Nanjing, Urumqi
XiamenAir	Changsha, Fuzhou, Hangzhou, Wuhan, Xiamen
Xizang Airlines	Jieyang, Lhasa, Tianjin, Xining

== See also ==
- List of airports in China
