= Huiyang railway station =

Railway station in Guangdong Province, China

Coordinates: 22.7868°N 114.4880°E

Huiyang railway station 惠阳站
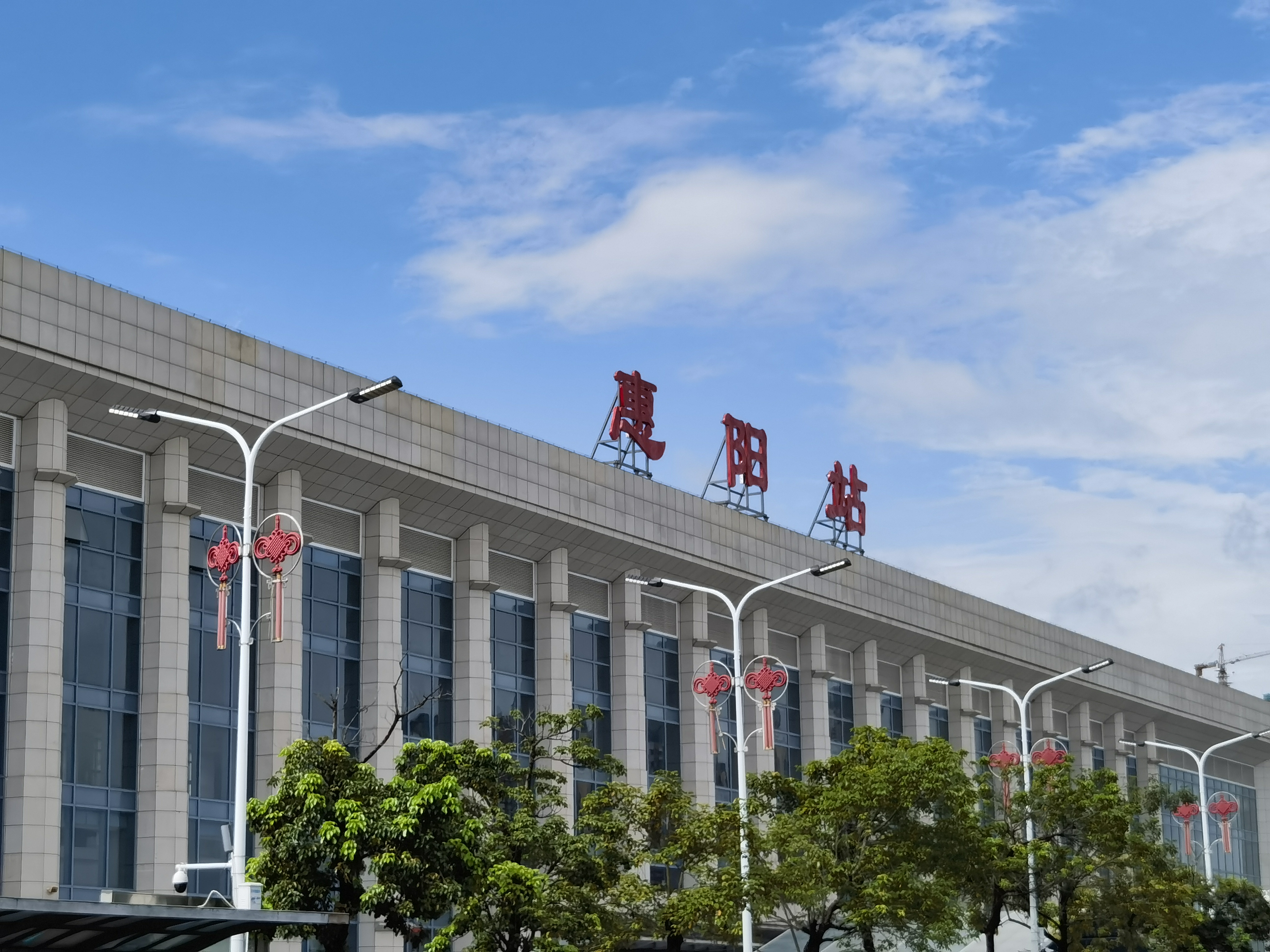

General information
- Location: Huiyang District, Huizhou, Guangdong; China
- Operated by: China Railway Guangzhou Group, China Railway Corporation
- Line(s): Xiamen-Shenzhen railway Shenzhen–Shanwei high-speed railway (under construction)

Huiyang railway station (Chinese: 惠阳站; pinyin: Huìyáng zhàn) is a railway station located in Huiyang District, Huizhou, Guangdong Province, China, on the Xiamen-Shenzhen Railway operated by the China Railway Guangzhou Group, China Railway Corporation.

== History ==
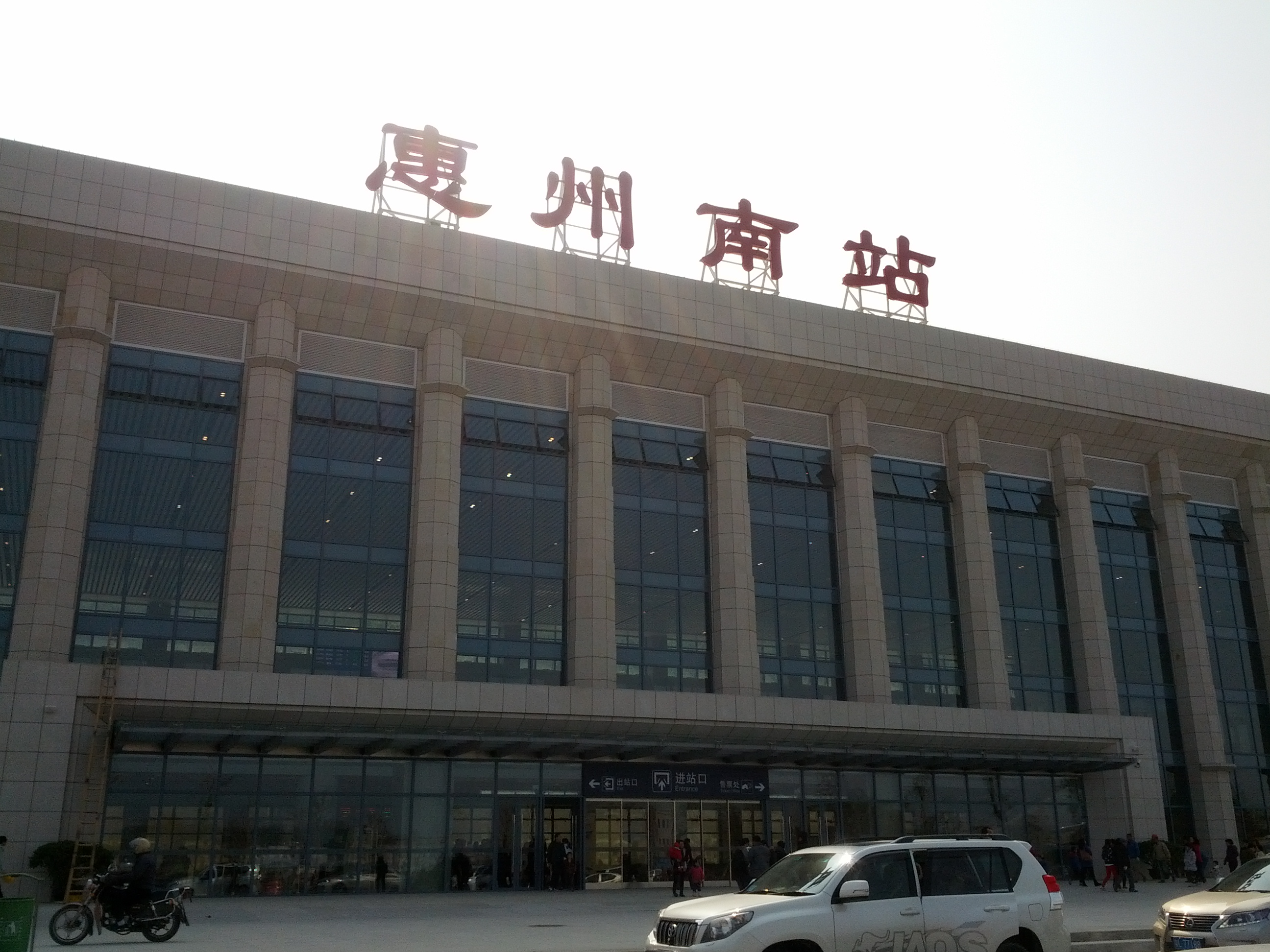
The station building before Huiyang Station was renamed (December 2013)

The station was originally constructed in 2010 and completed in 2013. It was formerly named Huizhou South railway station (Chinese: 惠州南站; pinyin: Huìzhōu Nán zhàn). On April 25, 2021, the Huizhou Port, Aviation, and Railway Affairs Center announced the "Renaming Plan for Some Rail Transit Stations in Huizhou", proposing to rename the station from "Huizhou South Station" to "Huiyang Station." The name change was officially implemented on June 27.

Preceding station	China Railway High-speed	Following station
Huidong South towards Xiamen North	Xiamen–Shenzhen railway	Shenzhen Pingshan towards Shenzhen North
