= The Second Emancipation =

2025 book

The Second Emancipation: Nkrumah, Pan-Africanism, and Global Blackness at High Tide
- Author: Howard W. French
- Language: English
- Publisher: Liveright
- Publication date: August 26, 2025
- Publication place: United States
- Pages: 512
- ISBN: 978-1324092452

The Second Emancipation: Nkrumah, Pan-Africanism, and Global Blackness at High Tide is a 2025 book by American journalist Howard W. French.

== Background ==
Howard W. French is an American journalist. He previously covered West and Central Africa for The New York Times in the 1990s, as well as served as a university instructor in the Côte d'Ivoire during the 1980s.

== Overview ==
The book focuses on the life and influence of Kwame Nkrumah, the first Ghanaian president and a leading figure of mid-20th century Pan-Africanism and decolonisation.

== Critical reception ==
Publishers Weekly gave the book a starred review: "Weaving a staggering amount of history into a propulsive narrative that recasts the 20th century as a long struggle for liberation, this is a towering achievement." Vivien Chang of The Los Angeles Review of Books praised the book, saying that it "reads as history told in the present tense, at once enthralling and devastating," and noting that while it was "not a traditional biography, its ruminations on Nkrumah as a person nonetheless constitute the book’s beating heart." Writing in History Today, Jonathan M. Jackson of the University of Oxford praised the book as "an important work that deserves to be widely read." Writing in The Wall Street Journal, American author Robert D. Kaplan wrote that "French has delivered a panoramic, sympathetic, yet analytical portrait of a global black movement... As the fastest-growing part of the world in population, Africa will matter more and more. And Mr. French is an expert guide to its nuances."

Kirkus Reviews gave the book a positive review, describing it as "a fluent exploration of an important if often overlooked political leader whose ideas still bear consideration." Jennifer Szalai of The New York Times wrote that the book "ably treads the line on Nkrumah’s complicated legacy."
