= West Air =

West Air or Westair may refer to:

- West Air (China), a Chinese low-cost airline
- West Air (United States), an American airline
- West Air Luxembourg, a cargo airline
- West Air Sweden, a cargo airline
- WestAir Commuter Airlines, an American regional airline based in Fresno, California
- Westair Aviation, a Namibian aviation service provider
- Westair Benin, an airline based in Cotonou, Benin
- Westair de Mexico, a defunct Mexican cargo airline
- Westair (France), a defunct airline of France

== See also ==
- Western Air
- Western Airlines
- Western (airline)
- Air West
- Hughes Airwest
