= Dongzhou, Guangdong =

Subdistrict of Chengqu District, Shanwei City, Guangdong Province, China

Dongzhou 东洲街道
- Subdistrict
- Location in Guangdong
- Coordinates: 22.710362°N 115.532784°E
- Country: People's Republic of China
- Province: Guangdong
- Prefecture-level city: Shanwei
- District: Chengqu District
- Time zone: UTC+8 (China Standard)

Dongzhou (simplified Chinese: 东洲街道; traditional Chinese: 東洲街道; pinyin: Dōngzhōu) is a coastal subdistrict in China's southern Guangdong Province, in the Chengqu District of the prefecture-level city of Shanwei.

Dongzhou is located some 15 km south-east of Shanwei's central urban area, on a peninsula that forms the south-western side of the Jieshi Bay. It is connected to Shanwei's central urban area by the Guangdong Provincial Highway 241 (S241) and County Road 141 (X141).

The subdistrict is inhabited largely by farmers and fishermen.

== 2005 Protests ==
The subdistrict was rocked by a series of protests in 2005 by residents against the confiscation of land by local officials for the purpose of constructing power-generation stations. One such protest, in December 2005, resulted in the shooting deaths of several residents by security forces; the Chinese government claimed that three were killed, while residents claimed that the number was between 20 and 33, with up to 40 more missing.
