= Shanwei railway station =

Railway station in Shanwei, China

Coordinates: 22.81367°N 115.42675°E

Shanwei 汕尾
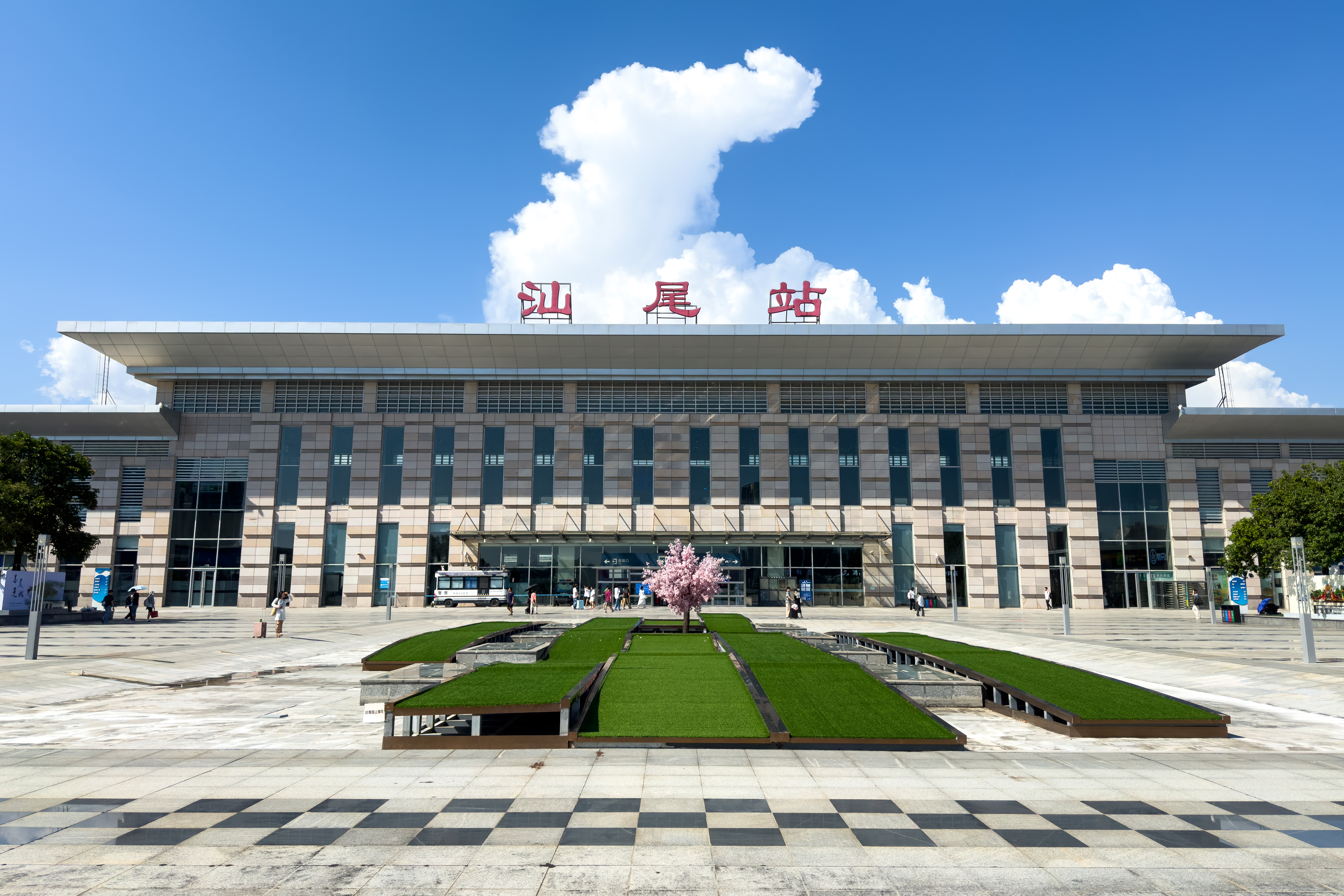

General information
- Location: Shanwei, Guangdong; China
- Operated by: Guangzhou Railway Group
- Line(s): Xiamen–Shenzhen railway; Guangzhou–Shanwei high-speed railway; Shantou–Shanwei high-speed railway (under construction)

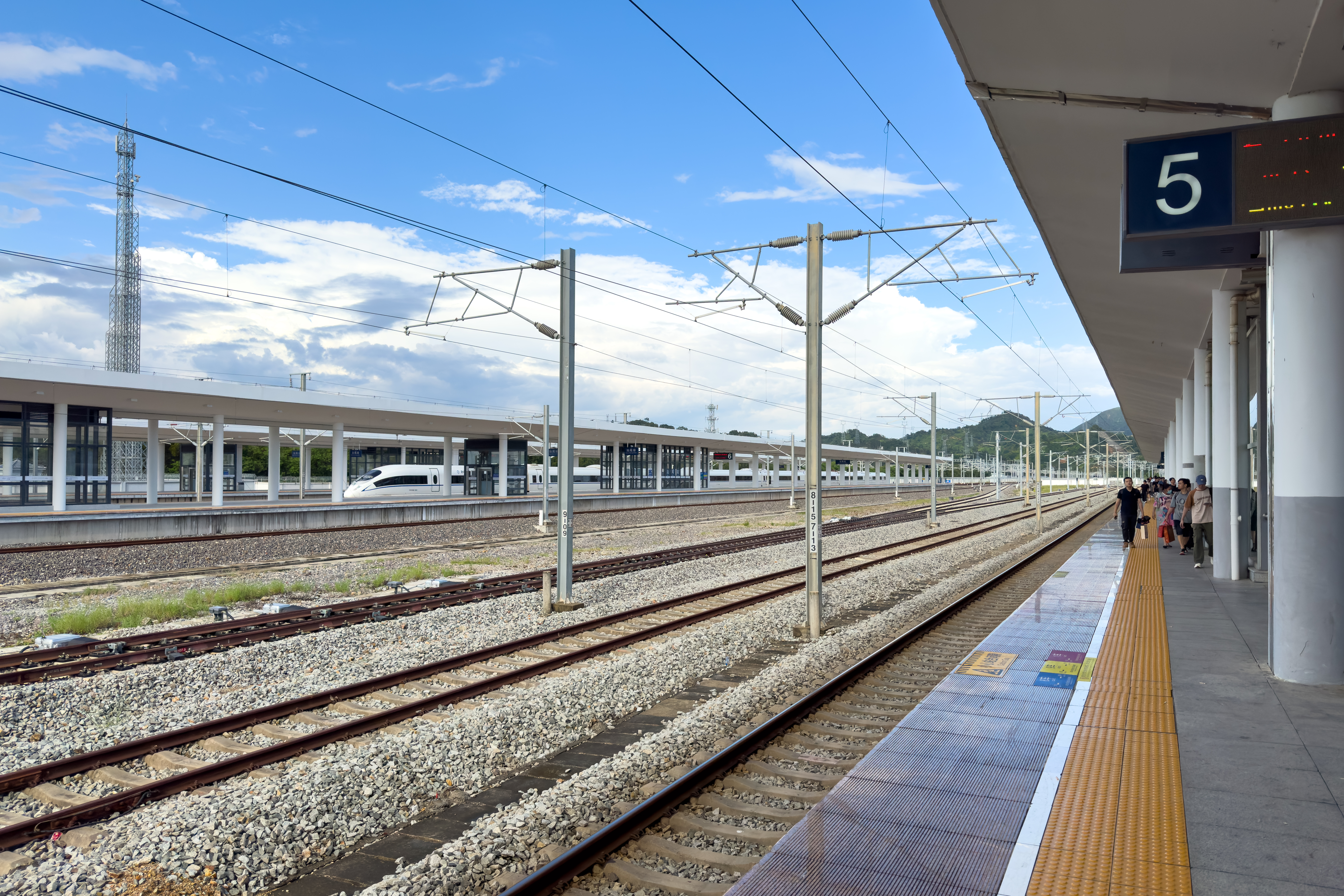
Platform 5

Shanwei railway station (Chinese: 汕尾站; pinyin: Shànwěi zhàn) is a railway station located in Haifeng County, Shanwei City, Guangdong Province, China, on the Xiamen–Shenzhen railway and Guangzhou–Shanwei high-speed railway. It is operated by the China Railway Guangzhou Group.

Shanwei railway station was opened in 2013.

Preceding station	China Railway High-speed	Following station
Lufeng towards Xiamen North	Xiamen–Shenzhen railway	Houmen towards Shenzhen North
