= Pingtan, Guangdong =

Pingtan 平潭镇
- Town
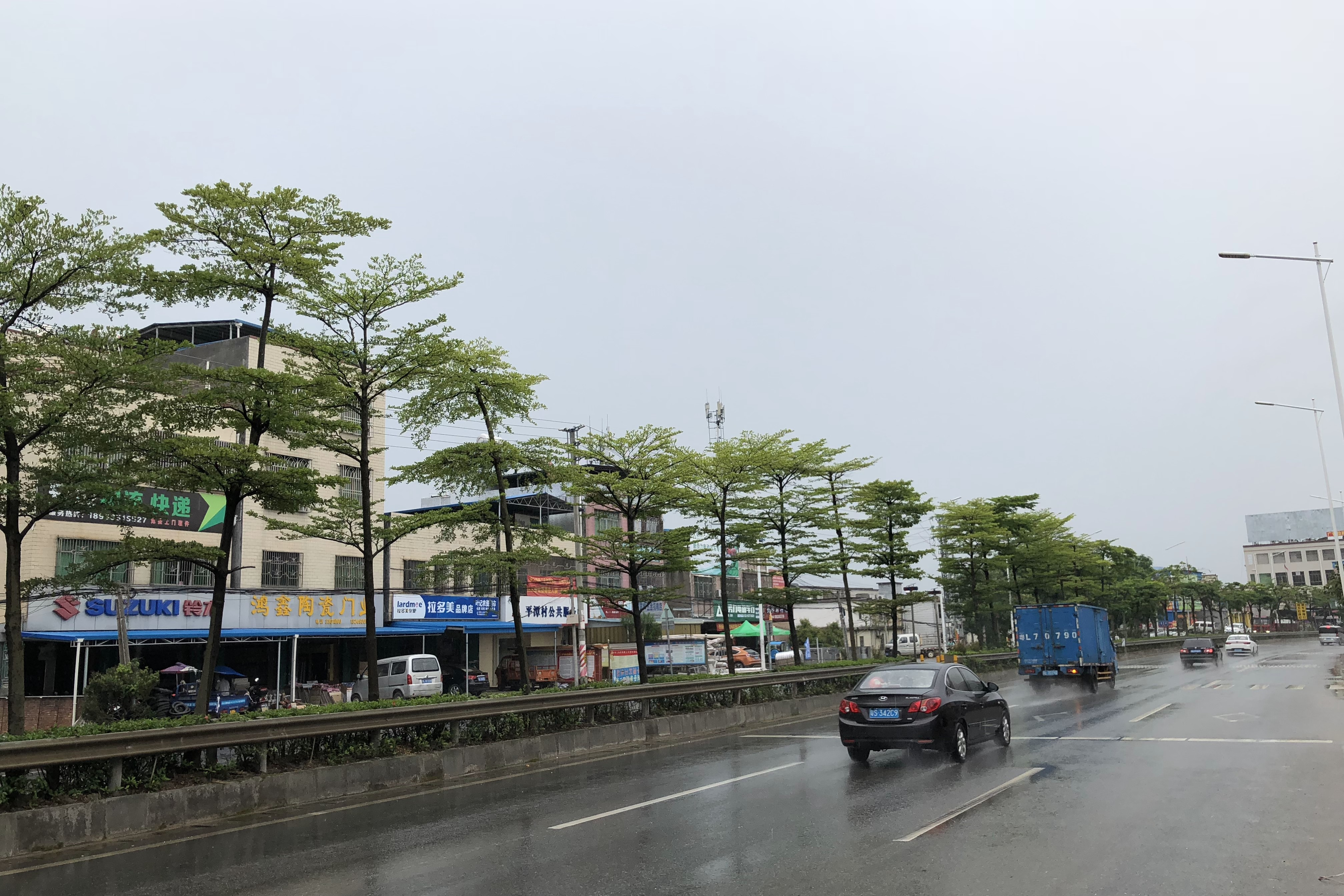
- Pingtan Village, 2018

- Location in Guangdong
- Coordinates: 23°02′31″N 114°34′27″E
- Country: People's Republic of China
- Province: Guangdong
- Prefecture-level city: Huizhou
- District: Huiyang District
- Time zone: UTC+8 (China Standard)

Pingtan (Chinese: 平潭; pinyin: Píngtán) is a town in Huiyang District, Huizhou, Guangdong province, China. As of 2020, it has two residential neighborhoods and 17 villages under its administration:

Neighborhoods

- Pingtan Community
- Pingtan Model Living Quarter (平潭示范场生活区)

Villages

- Pingtan Village
- Hongguang Village (红光村)
- Yangguang Village (阳光村)
- Fangkeng Village (房坑村)
- Jinxing Village (金星村)
- Xingang Village (新岗村)
- Zhangxin Village (张新村)
- Xintianpu Village (新田埔村)
- Dushi Village (独石村)
- Guanghui Village (光辉村)
- Chuanlong Village (川龙村)
- Xinxu Village (新圩村)
- Quedi Village (鹊地村)
- Hehu Village (鹤湖村)
- Jiangnan Village (江南村)
- Guangming Village (光明村)
- Lingwupai Village (凌屋排村)

== See also ==
- List of township-level divisions of Guangdong
