= Huiyang District =

Huiyang 惠阳区 Waiyeung
- District
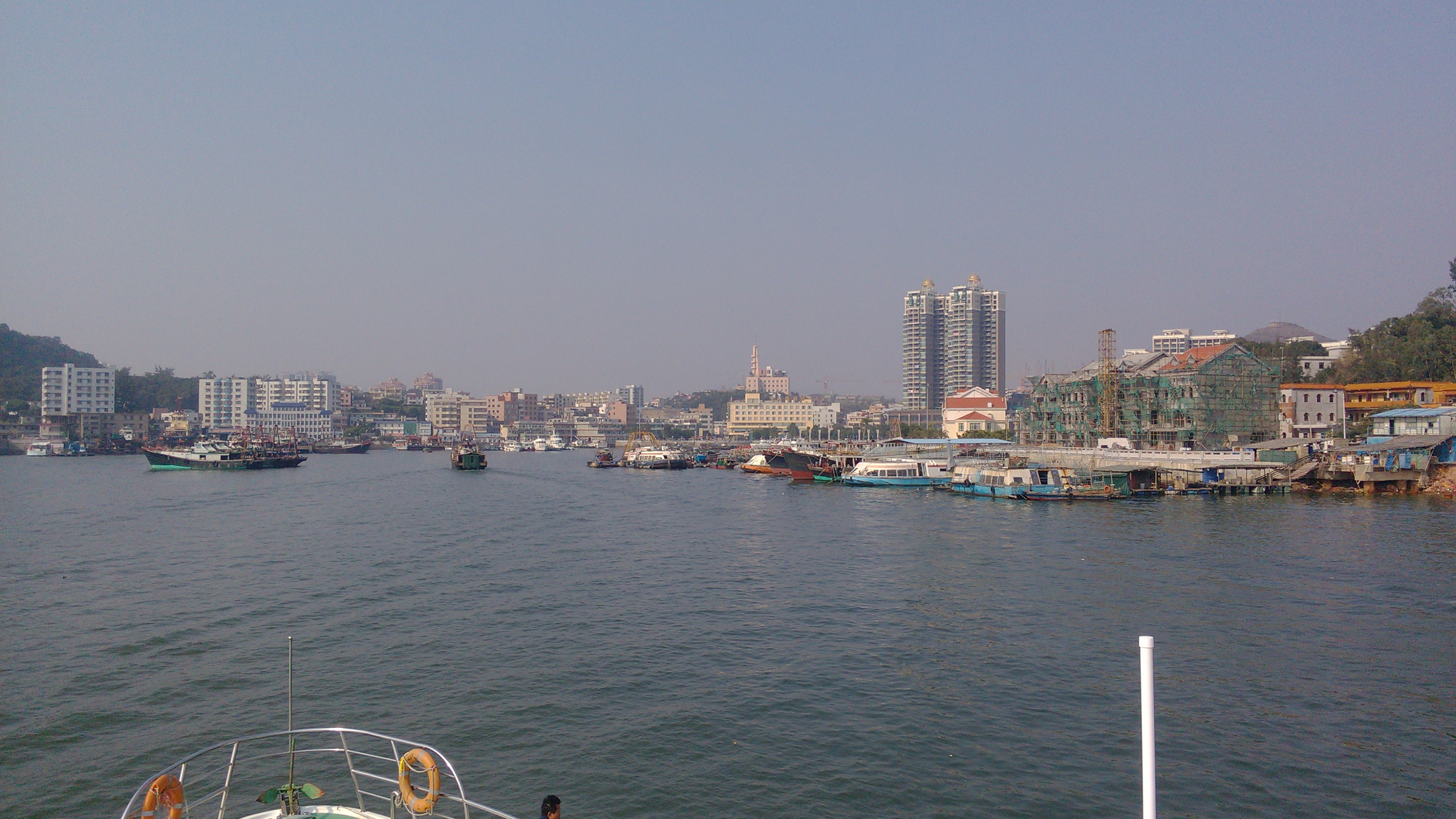
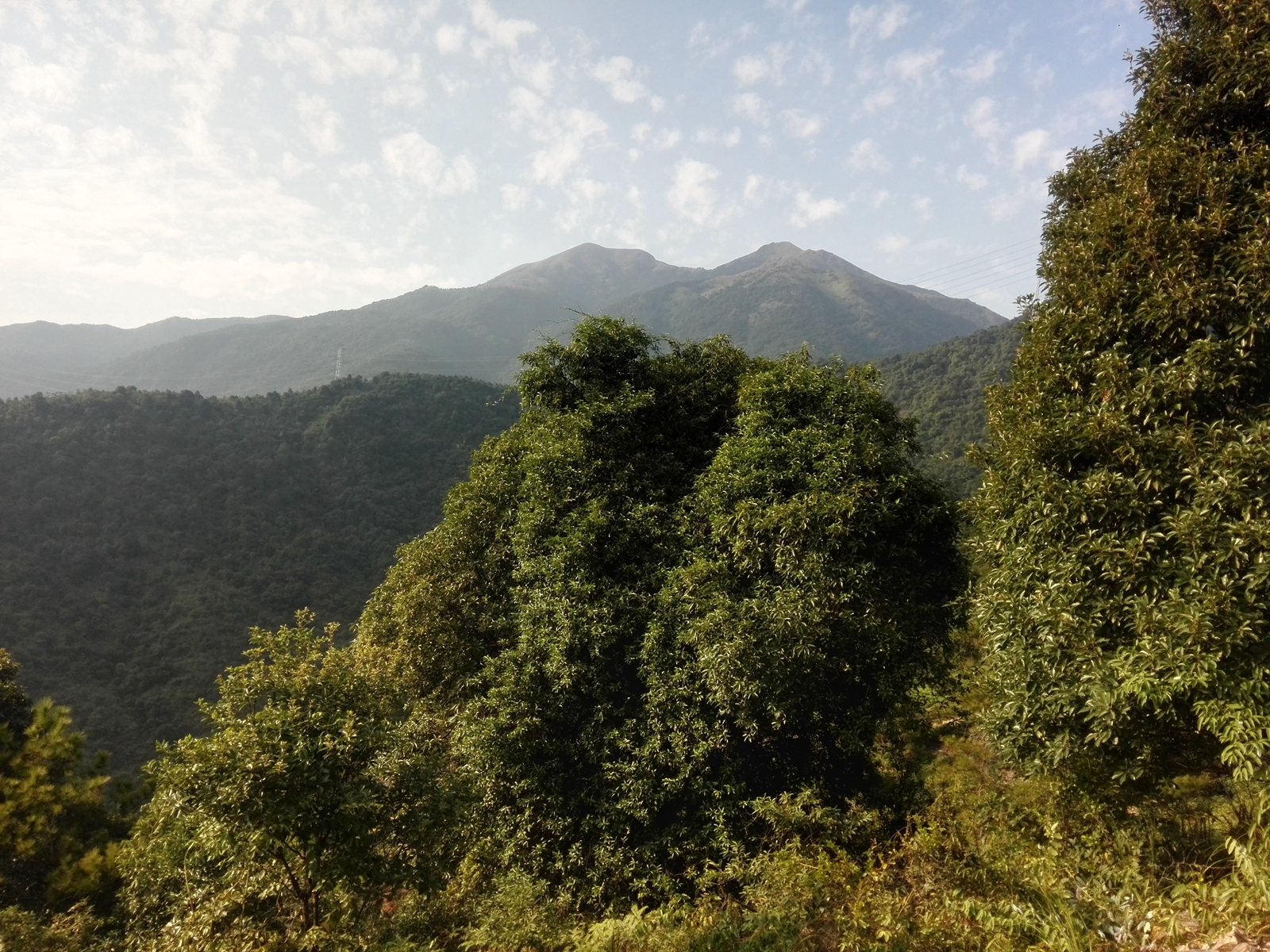
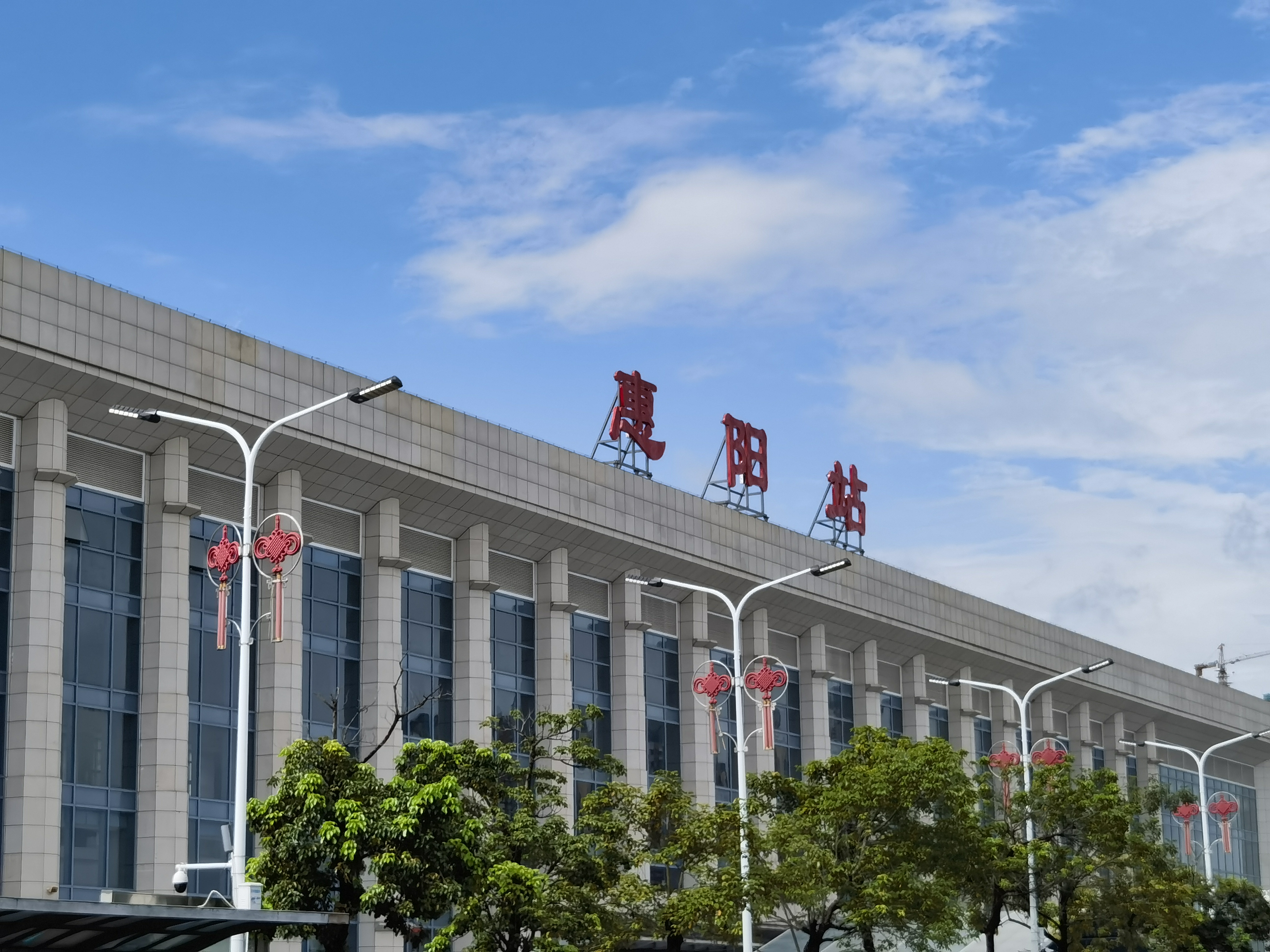
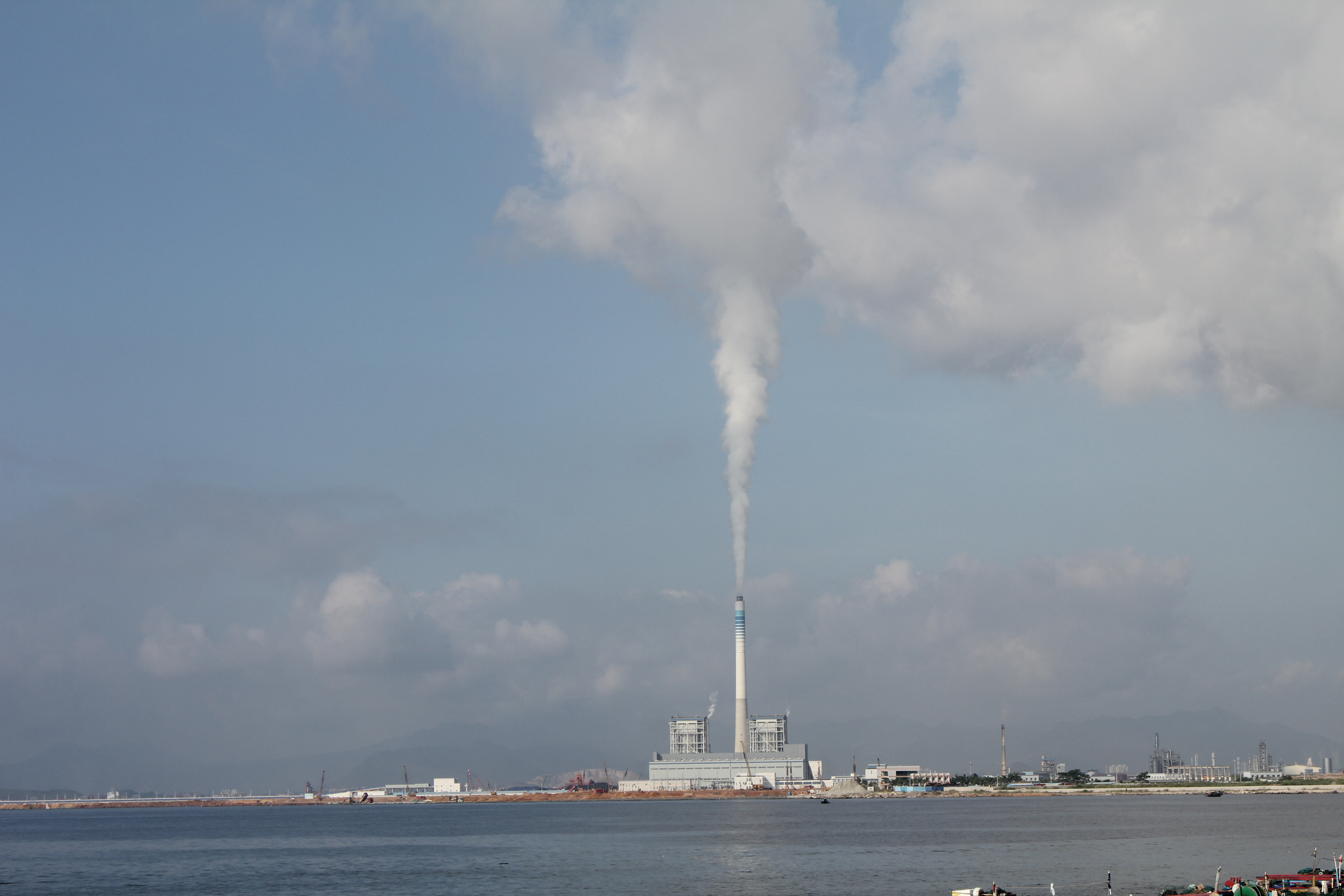
- Aotou Town Baiyun Mt Huiyang Station Industrial Zone

- Location in Guangdong
- Coordinates: 22°47′20″N 114°28′18″E
- Country: People's Republic of China
- Province: Guangdong
- Prefecture-level city: Huizhou

Area
  - Total: 1,262 km^{2} (487 sq mi)

Population
  - Total: 558,000
  - Density: 442/km^{2} (1,150/sq mi)
- Time zone: UTC+8 (China Standard)

Huiyang District (postal: Waiyeung; simplified Chinese: 惠阳区; traditional Chinese: 惠陽區; pinyin: Huìyáng Qū; Jyutping: wai^{6}joeng^{4} keoi^{1}) is a district of Huizhou, Guangdong province, People's Republic of China. It was renamed in 2003 amid the restructuring of districts and counties in Huizhou. Formerly named Huiyang city (county level), its size shrank after the restructuring with several towns incorporated into the Huicheng district of Huizhou. Huiyang is the southern urban center of Huizhou along with Huicheng as the northern urban center.

== Administrative divisions ==
Name	Chinese (S)	Hanyu Pinyin	Population (2010)	Area (km^{2})
Danshui Subdistrict	淡水街道	Dànshuǐ Jiēdào	226,703	80
Qiuchang Subdistrict	秋长街道	Qiūzhǎng Jiēdào	81,224	109.9
Aotou Subdistrict	澳头街道	Àotóu Jiēdào	58,766	110
Xiayong Subdistrict	霞涌街道	Xiáyǒng Jiēdào	19,304	80.8
Yonghu town	永湖镇	Yǒnghú Zhèn	25,575	130
Liangjing town	良井镇	Liángjǐng Zhèn	25,043	72.6
Pingtan town	平潭镇	Píngtán Zhèn	32,271	105
Shatian town	沙田镇	Shātián Zhèn	29,276	85
Xinxu town	新圩镇	Xīnwéi Zhèn	83,283	158.4
Zhenlong town	镇隆镇	Zhènlóng Zhèn	46,982	115.3

== Transport ==
There is a bus service from Huiyang District to Shenzhen Bao'an International Airport in Shenzhen.

Huiyang railway station on the Xiamen-Shenzhen Railway is located in the district.

== Climate ==
Climate data for Huiyang, elevation 109 m (358 ft), (1991–2020 normals, extremes 1955–2010)
Month	Jan	Feb	Mar	Apr	May	Jun	Jul	Aug	Sep	Oct	Nov	Dec	Year
Record high °C (°F)	29.1 (84.4)	30.1 (86.2)	32.5 (90.5)	34.2 (93.6)	35.7 (96.3)	38.0 (100.4)	38.9 (102.0)	37.7 (99.9)	36.4 (97.5)	36.0 (96.8)	33.0 (91.4)	29.6 (85.3)	38.9 (102.0)
Mean daily maximum °C (°F)	19.0 (66.2)	20.4 (68.7)	23.0 (73.4)	26.7 (80.1)	29.9 (85.8)	31.8 (89.2)	33.2 (91.8)	33.0 (91.4)	31.9 (89.4)	29.2 (84.6)	25.3 (77.5)	20.6 (69.1)	27.0 (80.6)
Daily mean °C (°F)	14.2 (57.6)	15.8 (60.4)	18.6 (65.5)	22.5 (72.5)	25.7 (78.3)	27.7 (81.9)	28.7 (83.7)	28.4 (83.1)	27.4 (81.3)	24.6 (76.3)	20.5 (68.9)	15.7 (60.3)	22.5 (72.5)
Mean daily minimum °C (°F)	11.0 (51.8)	12.7 (54.9)	15.6 (60.1)	19.6 (67.3)	22.9 (73.2)	25.0 (77.0)	25.7 (78.3)	25.6 (78.1)	24.4 (75.9)	21.3 (70.3)	17.0 (62.6)	12.4 (54.3)	19.4 (67.0)
Record low °C (°F)	−1.9 (28.6)	2.5 (36.5)	2.6 (36.7)	8.4 (47.1)	15.5 (59.9)	18.1 (64.6)	20.5 (68.9)	21.9 (71.4)	17.0 (62.6)	12.3 (54.1)	5.1 (41.2)	0.5 (32.9)	−1.9 (28.6)
Average precipitation mm (inches)	44.8 (1.76)	47.7 (1.88)	86.7 (3.41)	177.9 (7.00)	235.6 (9.28)	354.8 (13.97)	246.0 (9.69)	298.7 (11.76)	172.3 (6.78)	46.2 (1.82)	30.4 (1.20)	36.6 (1.44)	1,777.7 (69.99)
Average precipitation days (≥ 0.1 mm)	5.9	8.4	11.1	13.3	15.9	19.2	16.8	17.5	11.8	5.6	5.0	5.1	135.6
Average relative humidity (%)	70	75	78	80	81	82	80	81	77	69	68	66	76
Mean monthly sunshine hours	132.8	97.4	85.8	90.0	123.6	139.2	190.4	174.1	182.4	201.8	168.2	156.0	1,741.7
Percentage possible sunshine	39	33	28	30	34	40	52	48	50	52	50	45	42
Source: China Meteorological Administrationall-time record low
