= Shanwei =

Prefecture-level city in eastern Guangdong province, People's Republic of China

Shanwei 汕尾市 Swabue
- Prefecture-level city
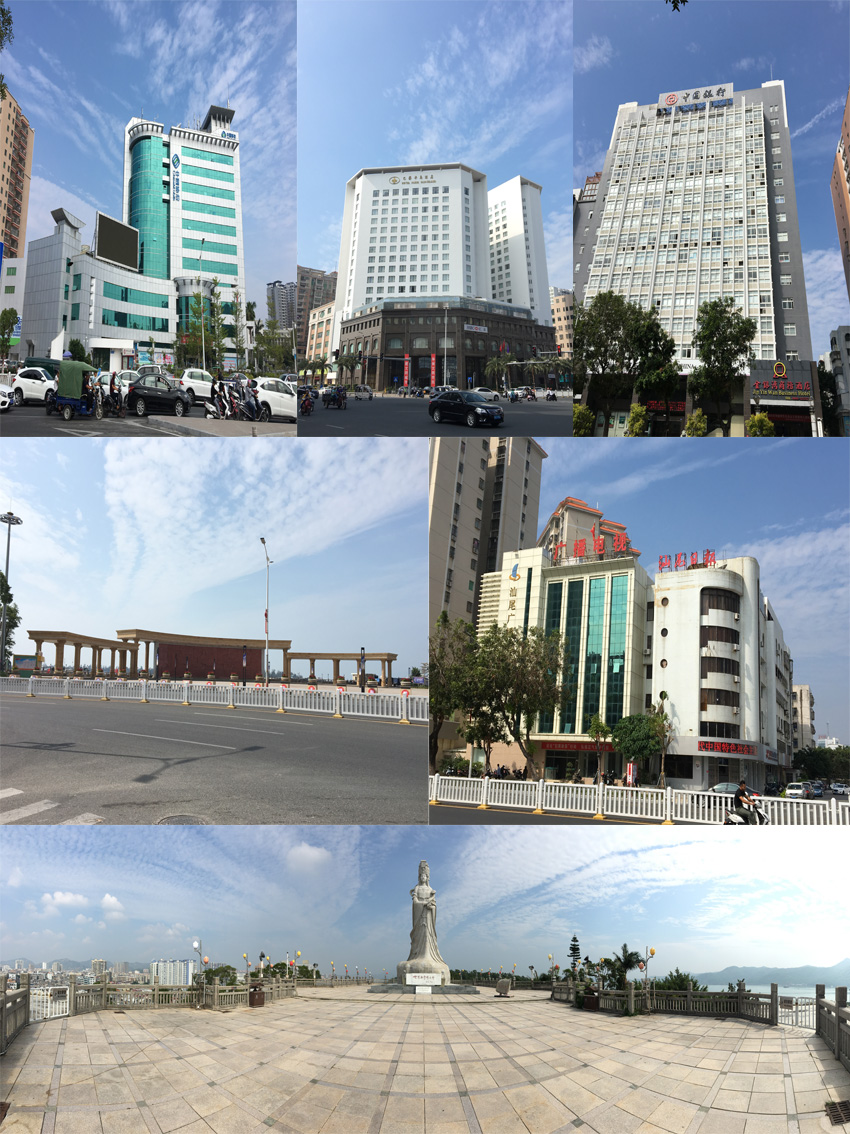
- Shanwei

- Location of Shanwei in Guangdong

- Location in China
- Coordinates (Shanwei municipal government): 22°47′14″N 115°22′32″E
- Country: People's Republic of China
- Province: Guangdong
- County-level divisions: 4
- Township divisions: 53
- Municipal seat: Chengqu

Government

Area
  - Prefecture-level city: 4,861.79 km^{2} (1,877.15 sq mi)
- Elevation: 8 m (26 ft)

Population (2010)
  - Prefecture-level city: 2,935,469
  - Density: 603.784/km^{2} (1,563.79/sq mi)
  - Urban: 437,000

GDP
  - Prefecture-level city: CN¥ 128.8 billion US$ 20.0 billion
  - Per capita: CN¥ 48,095; US$ 7,455
- Time zone: UTC+8 (China Standard)
- Postal codes: 516600 (Urban center) 516400, 516500, 516700 (Other areas)
- Area code: 660
- ISO 3166 code: CN-GD-15
- Licence plate prefixes: 粤N
- Major Nationalities: Han
- Coastline (excluding islands): 302 km (188 mi)

Shanwei
- "Shanwei", as written in Chinese
- Chinese: 汕尾
- Hanyu Pinyin: Shànwěi
- Cantonese Yale: Saanméih
- Postal: Swabue
- Literal meaning: Tail or end of the fishing sandbar
Transcriptions
Standard Mandarin
- Hanyu Pinyin: Shànwěi
- Gwoyeu Romatzyh: Shannwoei
- Wade–Giles: Shan^{4}-wei^{3}
- IPA: [ʂân.wèɪ]
Yue: Cantonese
- Yale Romanization: Saanméih
- Jyutping: Saan3mei5
- IPA: [san˧.mej˩˧]
Southern Min
- Teochew Peng'im: suan1 bhuê2

Shanwei (Chinese: 汕尾), or Swabue, or also sometimes known as Hailufeng (Chinese: 海陆丰, portmanteau of Haifeng and Lufeng) is a resort city in eastern Guangdong province, China. It borders Jieyang to the east, Meizhou and Heyuan to the north, Huizhou to the west, and looks out to the South China Sea to the south. It lies approximately 120 kilometres (75 mi) east of Shenzhen and most of the locals speak the Haifeng dialect, a variety of Southern Min.

== History ==
Shanwei City was established in 1988. It was politically administered as part of Huizhoufu (惠州府) by the Ming and Qing empires, Shanwei it gained its prefectural and administrative independence from Huizhou during the Nationalist period.

The dominant ethnic population is Hoklo who came as a result of the large decrease in population caused by warfare in the early Qing dynasty in what is now Shanwei.

=== Recent history ===
On the night of December 6, 2005, a protest had broken out for land confiscated by the government. To calm the protest, armed police were sent to the village of Dongzhou after the aggressive villagers attacked the unarmed police. It was reported by the Chinese government that, three people were found dead after the protest. However, the number was doubted by media to be between 20 and 40.

In 2011, a conflict between the residents of the Wukan village (in Shanwei's Lufeng county-level city, on the Jieshi Bay some 30 km (19 mi) east of Shanwei city center) attracted world media's attention.

Chinese Coast Guardsman Wang Xiaolong, the only line of duty death of the China Coast Guard, served in the Shanwei Coast Guard Bureau and was killed off the coast of Shanwei.

== Administration ==
The prefecture-level city of Shanwei administers 4 county-level divisions, including 1 district, 1 county-level city and 2 counties.

Map
Name	Simplified Chinese	Hanyu Pinyin	Population (2010 census)	Area (km^{2})	Density (/km^{2})
Chengqu District	城区	Chéng Qū	491,766	421	1,168
Haifeng County	海丰县	Hǎifēng Xiàn	804,107	1,750	459
Luhe County	陆河县	Lùhé Xiàn	314,153	986	318
Lufeng City	陆丰市	Lùfēng Shì	1,688,536	1,671	940
Shenshan Special; Cooperation Zone	深汕特别合作区	Shēnshàn Tèbié; Hézuò Qū			

These are further divided into 53 township-level divisions, including 40 towns, 10 townships and 3 subdistricts.

== Geography and climate ==
Shanwei has a monsoon-influenced humid subtropical climate (Köppen Cwa), with short, mild to warm winters, and long, hot, humid summers. Winter begins sunny and dry but becomes progressively wetter and cloudier. Spring is generally overcast, while summer brings the heaviest rains of the year though is much sunnier; there are 10.3 days with 50 mm (1.97 in) or more rainfall. Autumn is sunny and dry. The monthly 24-hour average temperature ranges from 15.2 °C (59.4 °F) in January to 28.3 °C (82.9 °F) in July, and the annual mean is 22.60 °C (72.7 °F). The annual rainfall is around 1,891 mm (74 in), about two-thirds of which occurs from May to August. With monthly percent possible sunshine ranging from 26% in March to 57% in October, the city receives 1,925 hours of bright sunshine annually.

Climate data for Shanwei, elevation 17 m (56 ft), (1991–2020 normals, extremes 1952–present)
Month	Jan	Feb	Mar	Apr	May	Jun	Jul	Aug	Sep	Oct	Nov	Dec	Year
Record high °C (°F)	28.6 (83.5)	31.0 (87.8)	32.8 (91.0)	33.9 (93.0)	34.4 (93.9)	37.2 (99.0)	38.5 (101.3)	37.0 (98.6)	37.0 (98.6)	34.7 (94.5)	33.2 (91.8)	31.4 (88.5)	38.5 (101.3)
Mean daily maximum °C (°F)	19.5 (67.1)	20.0 (68.0)	22.1 (71.8)	25.3 (77.5)	28.4 (83.1)	30.1 (86.2)	31.2 (88.2)	31.3 (88.3)	31.1 (88.0)	28.9 (84.0)	25.6 (78.1)	21.4 (70.5)	26.2 (79.2)
Daily mean °C (°F)	15.3 (59.5)	16.1 (61.0)	18.6 (65.5)	22.1 (71.8)	25.5 (77.9)	27.6 (81.7)	28.5 (83.3)	28.4 (83.1)	27.6 (81.7)	25.0 (77.0)	21.4 (70.5)	17.1 (62.8)	22.8 (73.0)
Mean daily minimum °C (°F)	12.4 (54.3)	13.5 (56.3)	16.0 (60.8)	19.8 (67.6)	23.2 (73.8)	25.5 (77.9)	26.1 (79.0)	25.9 (78.6)	24.9 (76.8)	22.1 (71.8)	18.3 (64.9)	14.1 (57.4)	20.2 (68.3)
Record low °C (°F)	1.6 (34.9)	2.3 (36.1)	4.0 (39.2)	8.2 (46.8)	14.5 (58.1)	18.2 (64.8)	21.4 (70.5)	18.4 (65.1)	18.0 (64.4)	8.9 (48.0)	5.8 (42.4)	2.1 (35.8)	1.6 (34.9)
Average precipitation mm (inches)	33.1 (1.30)	38.8 (1.53)	71.4 (2.81)	143.0 (5.63)	264.3 (10.41)	443.3 (17.45)	300.3 (11.82)	343.4 (13.52)	199.3 (7.85)	43.2 (1.70)	28.1 (1.11)	24.1 (0.95)	1,932.3 (76.08)
Average precipitation days (≥ 0.1 mm)	4.9	7.2	10.1	11.5	13.5	17.4	16.9	15.2	10.8	3.9	4.0	4.9	120.3
Average relative humidity (%)	71	76	78	82	83	85	84	83	77	70	70	67	77
Mean monthly sunshine hours	153.2	114.4	104.7	118.2	149.2	166.0	224.3	201.6	198.0	214.5	183.8	167.6	1,995.5
Percentage possible sunshine	45	36	28	31	36	41	54	51	54	60	56	50	45
Source: China Meteorological Administration extremesall-time August High

== Transportation ==
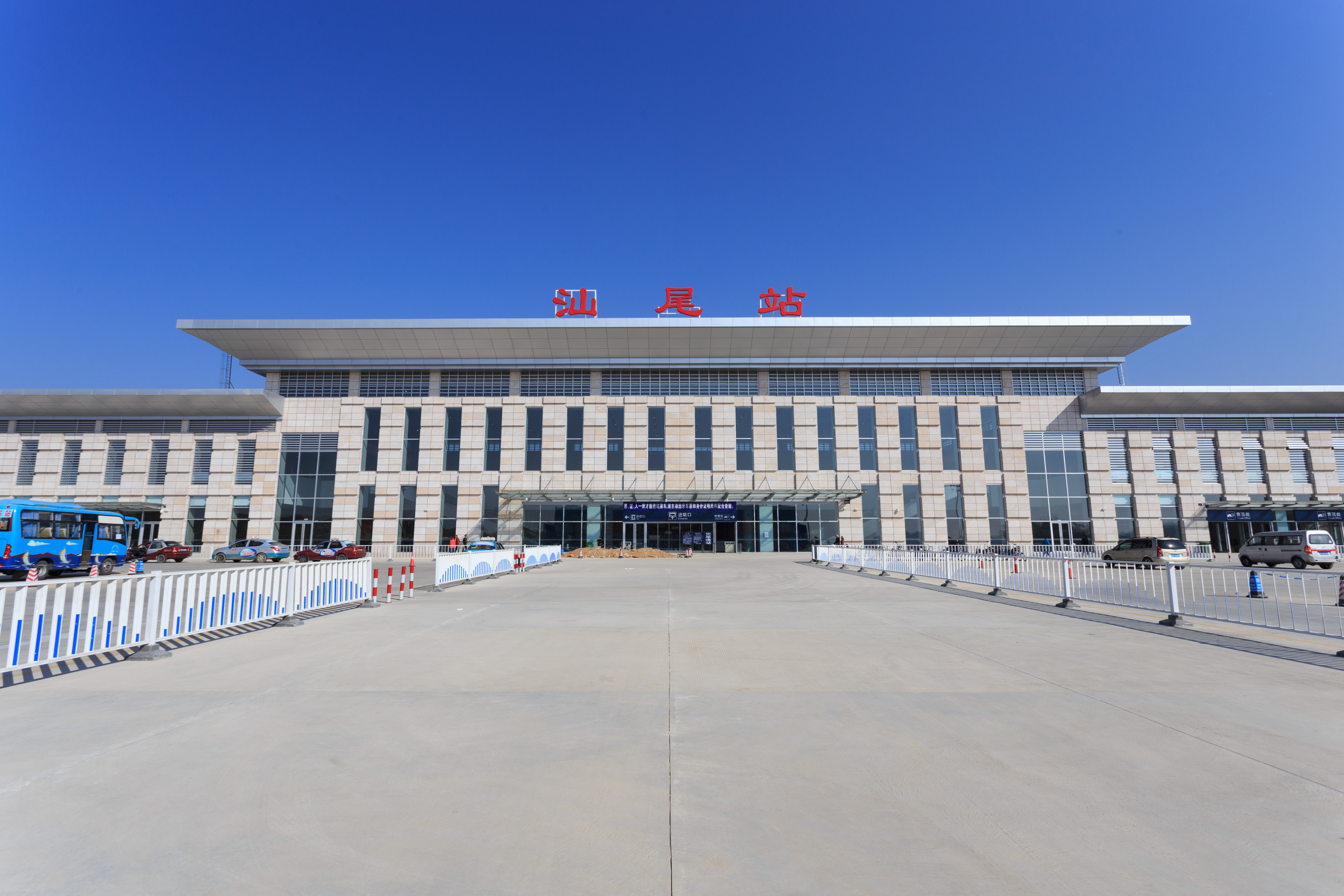
Shanwei Railway Station

- Xiamen–Shenzhen Railway.

== Economy ==
=== Ties with Shenzhen ===
According to a December 2011 report, officials from Shenzhen considered Shanwei as one of the major destinations to which air-polluting industries should be relocated from Shenzhen. According to the mayor of Shenzhen, some 4000 Shenzhen factories should be moved to an industrial park in Shanwei.

=== Crops ===
Farming is a large part of Shanwei's economy, thanks to its relatively warm climate. Many different types of crops are planted, rice, sesame, sweet potatoes, corn, bananas, just to name a few. 29 families and 42 species of plants are planted in total, on its 96.6 thousand hectares of farmland. Together with the timber and fish industry, the agriculture industry makes 25099 million Chinese yuan yearly.

=== Fisheries ===
Shanwei has a rich and diverse sea ecosystem. It is a famous fishing ground in Guangdong. With a vast amount of fish, shrimp, crab, shellfish, and seaweed found, the fishing industry there has been thriving for centuries. Currently 25099 million Chinese yuan are earned from the fishing industry, including other harvest industries such as agriculture each year.

=== Tourism ===
Shanwei is a popular tourist destination due to its long coastline and local customs. The few major tourist points in Shanwei are Lufeng Jieshi Xuanwu Mountain Tourist Area, Shanwei Fengshan Ancestral Temple Tourist Area, Red Bay Tourist Area, Haifeng Lotus Mountain Resort, Tongdingshan Tourist Area, Haifeng Red Palace Red Square Former Residence, Peng Pai Martyr's Former Residence, Shuide Mountain Tourist Resort, Luhe Luodong Shiwai Meiyuan Tourist Area, Lufeng Fushan Mazu Tourist Area, Lufeng Jinxiang Beach Seascape Area, Lufeng Qingyun Mountain, Luhe God Elephant Mountain Park, Luhe Red Spine Forest Ecological Park. It's also one of the 13 communist revolution starting points in China, which can be used as a selling point.

== Language ==
The language generally used is Haklau Min which is similar to Hokkien and Teochew, belonging to the Southern Min division of Min Chinese. Haifeng, Lufeng and the urban area have nearly the same accent. Most parts of the rural Luhe county formerly part of Lufeng use the rural Hakka Chinese language belonging to the Xinhui subdialect of the Yuetai dialect.

As Shanwei is near the Pearl River Delta and Hong Kong, together with the impact of television programs from Hong Kong and population movements within Guangdong province, many local residents, especially the younger generation, have communication skills in Cantonese.
