= Huidong County, Guangdong =

Huidong 惠东县
- County
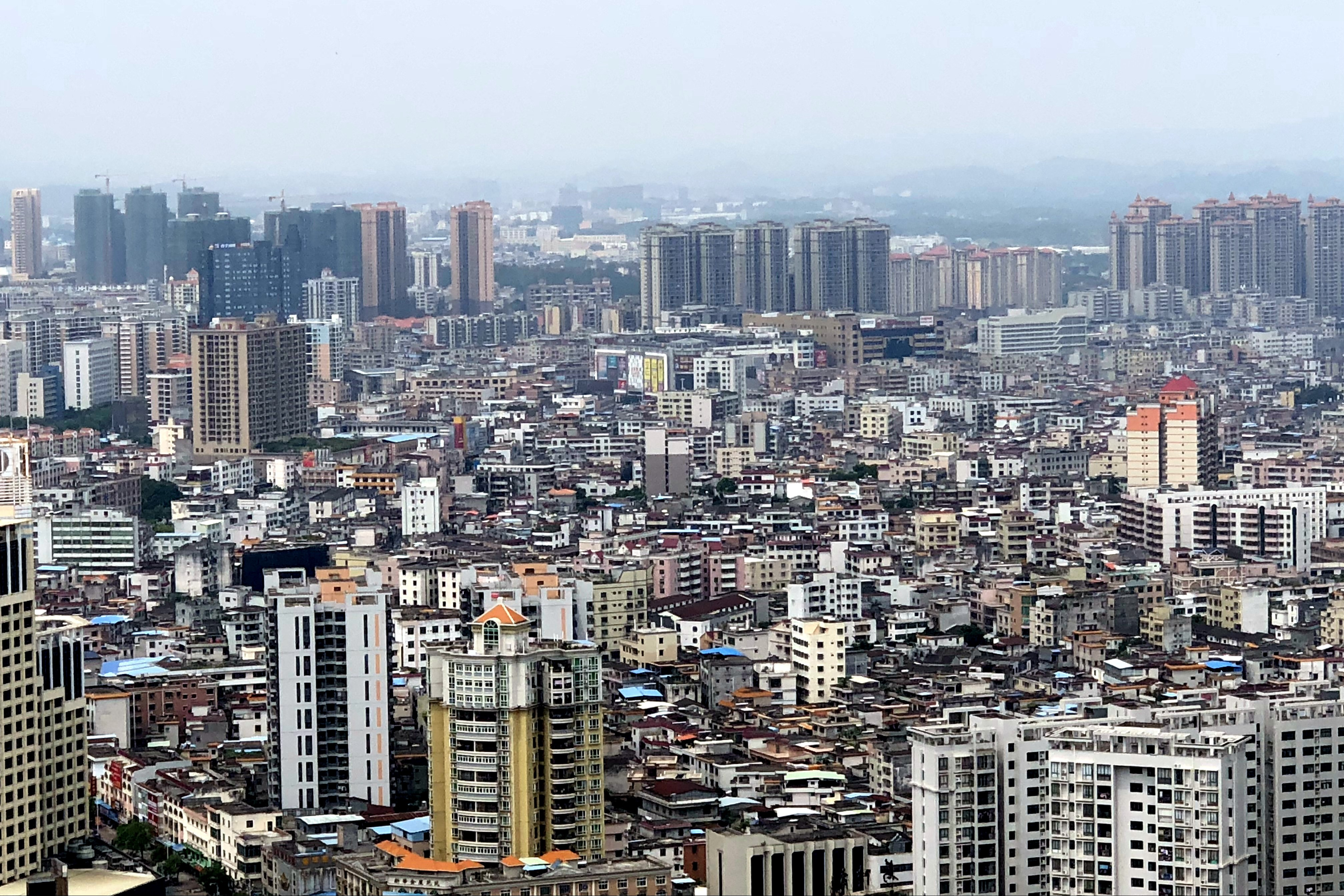
- Downtown Huidong, seen from Mount Fei'eling

- Location of the seat in Guangdong
- Coordinates: 23°02′N 114°56′E
- Country: People's Republic of China
- Province: Guangdong
- Prefecture-level city: Huizhou

Area
  - Total: 3,397 km^{2} (1,312 sq mi)

Population (2020 census)
  - Total: 1,018,076
  - Density: 299.7/km^{2} (776.2/sq mi)
- Time zone: UTC+8 (China Standard)

Huidong
- Traditional Chinese: 惠東
- Simplified Chinese: 惠东
- Postal: Waitung
Transcriptions
Standard Mandarin
- Hanyu Pinyin: Huìdōng
- Wade–Giles: Hui^{4}-tung^{1}
Yue: Cantonese
- Jyutping: wai6 dung1

Huidong County (simplified Chinese: 惠东县; traditional Chinese: 惠東縣; pinyin: Huìdōng Xiàn; Jyutping: wai6 dung1 jyun6) is a county of southeastern Guangdong province, People's Republic of China, with some South China Sea coast in the south of the county. It is under the administration of Huizhou City.

== Administrative divisions ==
The county is responsible for the administration of one subdistrict and 13 towns.

| Name | Chinese (S) | Hanyu Pinyin | Population (2010) | Area (km^{2}) |
|---|---|---|---|---|
| Pingshan Subdistrict | 平山街道 | Píngshān Jiēdào | 236,877 | 329.22 |
| Daling Subdistrict | 大岭街道 | Dàlǐng Jiēdào | 115,762 | 160.23 |
| Baihua town | 白花镇 | Báihuā Zhèn | 63,904 | 203.61 |
| Lianghua town | 梁化镇 | Liánghuà Zhèn | 44,122 | 177.7 |
| Renshan town (Nimshan; Jenshan) | 稔山镇 | Rěnshān Zhèn | 63,662 | 183.3 |
| Tieyong town | 铁涌镇 | Tiěyǒng Zhèn | 34,653 | 120 |
| Pinghai town | 平海镇 | Pínghǎi Zhèn | 60,323 | 136 |
| Jilong town | 吉隆镇 | Jílóng Zhèn | 78,773 | 99 |
| Huangbu town | 黄埠镇 | Huángbù Zhèn | 83,756 | 97.7 |
| Duozhu town | 多祝镇 | Duōzhù Zhèn | 63,039 | 408.96 |
| Andun town | 安墩镇 | Āndūn Zhèn | 36,297 | 369.5 |
| Gaotan town | 高潭镇 | Gāotán Zhèn | 7,399 | 193 |
| Baokou town | 宝口镇 | Bǎokǒu Zhèn | 7,565 | 146.8 |
| Baipenzhu town | 白盆珠镇 | Báipénzhū Zhèn | 12,258 | 74 |

=== Pingshan Subdistrict ===
Pingshan Subdistrict is an area where people came to trade 40 years ago, now it is still functioning for this reason. And also because of historical reason, a road connecting Guangzhou to Shantou was built like at least 30 years ago, the road was responsible for transportation the cargo from Guangzhou to Shantou or vice versa, and due to this, drivers can take a rest in the middle of this long journey in Pingshan. They can have sleep in the automobile hotel, they can supply water to automobile engine, change the tires, etc. In those days, Pingshan is majorly growing foods, people from those time can trade their raw foods with whatever they need from the cargo buses. This area is near the Pacific Ocean, the climate feature to subtropical climate. Winds or storm come from ocean in the summer, sometimes it is very strong, if people live in this condition, they will not last for a long time, but thanks to god, there is mountain lying from east to west, and it can weaken the storm if there is such, so people can live peacefully and can have generations. We always say, water is the source of life. And indeed, if there is no water in the area, there will be no people or plant, and all of this living things should thank to the mountain.

== Transportation ==
Huidong South railway station is located in the county. Additionally, there is a bus service from Huidong County to Shenzhen Bao'an International Airport in Shenzhen.

== Climate ==
Climate data for Huidong, elevation 85 m (279 ft), (1991–2020 normals, extremes 1981–present)
| Month | Jan | Feb | Mar | Apr | May | Jun | Jul | Aug | Sep | Oct | Nov | Dec | Year |
|---|---|---|---|---|---|---|---|---|---|---|---|---|---|
| Record high °C (°F) | 29.6 (85.3) | 29.4 (84.9) | 32.2 (90.0) | 34.3 (93.7) | 34.5 (94.1) | 36.6 (97.9) | 37.8 (100.0) | 36.6 (97.9) | 36.1 (97.0) | 35.1 (95.2) | 33.2 (91.8) | 30.0 (86.0) | 37.8 (100.0) |
| Mean daily maximum °C (°F) | 19.5 (67.1) | 20.6 (69.1) | 23.1 (73.6) | 26.6 (79.9) | 29.6 (85.3) | 31.3 (88.3) | 32.6 (90.7) | 32.5 (90.5) | 31.6 (88.9) | 29.2 (84.6) | 25.6 (78.1) | 20.9 (69.6) | 26.9 (80.5) |
| Daily mean °C (°F) | 14.1 (57.4) | 15.6 (60.1) | 18.4 (65.1) | 22.3 (72.1) | 25.5 (77.9) | 27.5 (81.5) | 28.3 (82.9) | 27.9 (82.2) | 26.8 (80.2) | 24.1 (75.4) | 20.1 (68.2) | 15.4 (59.7) | 22.2 (71.9) |
| Mean daily minimum °C (°F) | 10.6 (51.1) | 12.3 (54.1) | 15.2 (59.4) | 19.2 (66.6) | 22.4 (72.3) | 24.6 (76.3) | 25.1 (77.2) | 24.8 (76.6) | 23.6 (74.5) | 20.5 (68.9) | 16.3 (61.3) | 11.7 (53.1) | 18.9 (66.0) |
| Record low °C (°F) | 0.2 (32.4) | 2.4 (36.3) | 4.2 (39.6) | 8.8 (47.8) | 15.7 (60.3) | 19.1 (66.4) | 21.7 (71.1) | 19.3 (66.7) | 17.2 (63.0) | 10.5 (50.9) | 4.6 (40.3) | 0.1 (32.2) | 0.1 (32.2) |
| Average precipitation mm (inches) | 42.2 (1.66) | 44.9 (1.77) | 83.1 (3.27) | 175.5 (6.91) | 235.1 (9.26) | 388.9 (15.31) | 284.3 (11.19) | 328.2 (12.92) | 200.3 (7.89) | 42.6 (1.68) | 31.3 (1.23) | 35.4 (1.39) | 1,891.8 (74.48) |
| Average precipitation days (≥ 0.1 mm) | 5.9 | 8.5 | 11.7 | 12.6 | 15.6 | 19.2 | 17.0 | 17.6 | 12.9 | 5.0 | 4.6 | 5.7 | 136.3 |
| Average relative humidity (%) | 74 | 78 | 80 | 81 | 82 | 83 | 81 | 82 | 79 | 74 | 73 | 71 | 78 |
| Mean monthly sunshine hours | 147.0 | 114.5 | 110.9 | 122.9 | 156.4 | 172.2 | 220.9 | 199.0 | 192.9 | 201.7 | 179.2 | 163.4 | 1,981 |
| Percentage possible sunshine | 44 | 36 | 30 | 32 | 38 | 43 | 54 | 50 | 53 | 56 | 54 | 49 | 45 |
Source: China Meteorological Administrationall-time November high

== See also ==
- Renping Peninsula
