= Bei'er Road station =

Metro station in Shenzhen, Guangdong, China

Bei'er Road 贝尔路
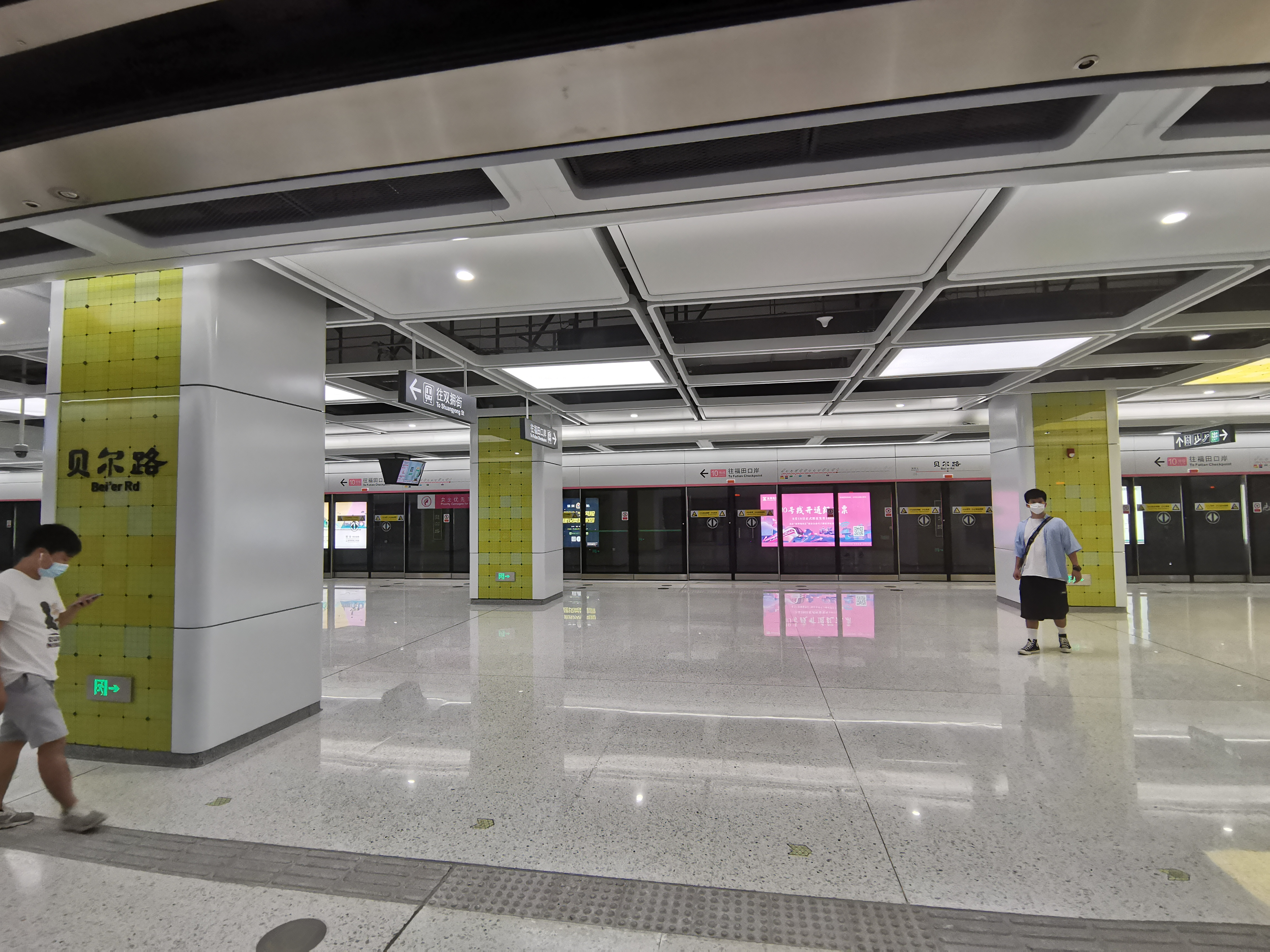

General information
- Location: Longgang District, Shenzhen, Guangdong; China
- Coordinates: 22.644277°N 114.061312°E
- Operated by: SZMC (Shenzhen Metro Group)
- Line: Line 10
- Platforms: 2 (1 island platform)
- Tracks: 2

Construction
- Structure type: Underground
- Accessible: Yes

History
- Opened: 18 August 2020

Services
Preceding station	Shenzhen Metro	Following station
Huawei towards Shuangyong Street	Line 10	Bantian North towards Futian Checkpoint
Location

Bei'er Road station (Chinese: 贝尔路站; pinyin: Bèi'ěrlù Zhàn) is a station on Line 10 of the Shenzhen Metro. It opened on 18 August 2020.

== Station layout ==
G	-	Exit
B1F; Concourse	Lobby	Customer Service, Shops, Vending machines, ATMs
B2F; Platforms	Platform	← Line 10 towards Futian Checkpoint (Bantian North)
B2F; Platforms	Island platform, doors will open on the left
B2F; Platforms	Platform	→ Line 10 towards Shuangyong Street (Huawei) →

== Exits ==
Exit	Destination
Exit A	East Side of Banxuegang Blvd (S), South Side of Bei'er Rd (E)
Exit B	East Side of Banxuegang Blvd (N), North Side of Bei'er Rd (E), Bijiasuo Blvd, Xiaobang Rd
Exit C	West Side of Banxuegang Blvd (N), North Side of Bei'er Rd (W), Julifuren Blvd
Exit D	West Side of Banxuegang Blvd (S), South Side of Bei'er Rd (W), Chongzhi Blvd, Banxing Rd, Ping'an Park, Huangjinshan Park
