= Bantian North station =

Metro station in Shenzhen, China

Coordinates: 22.637612°N 114.058191°E

Bantian North 坂田北
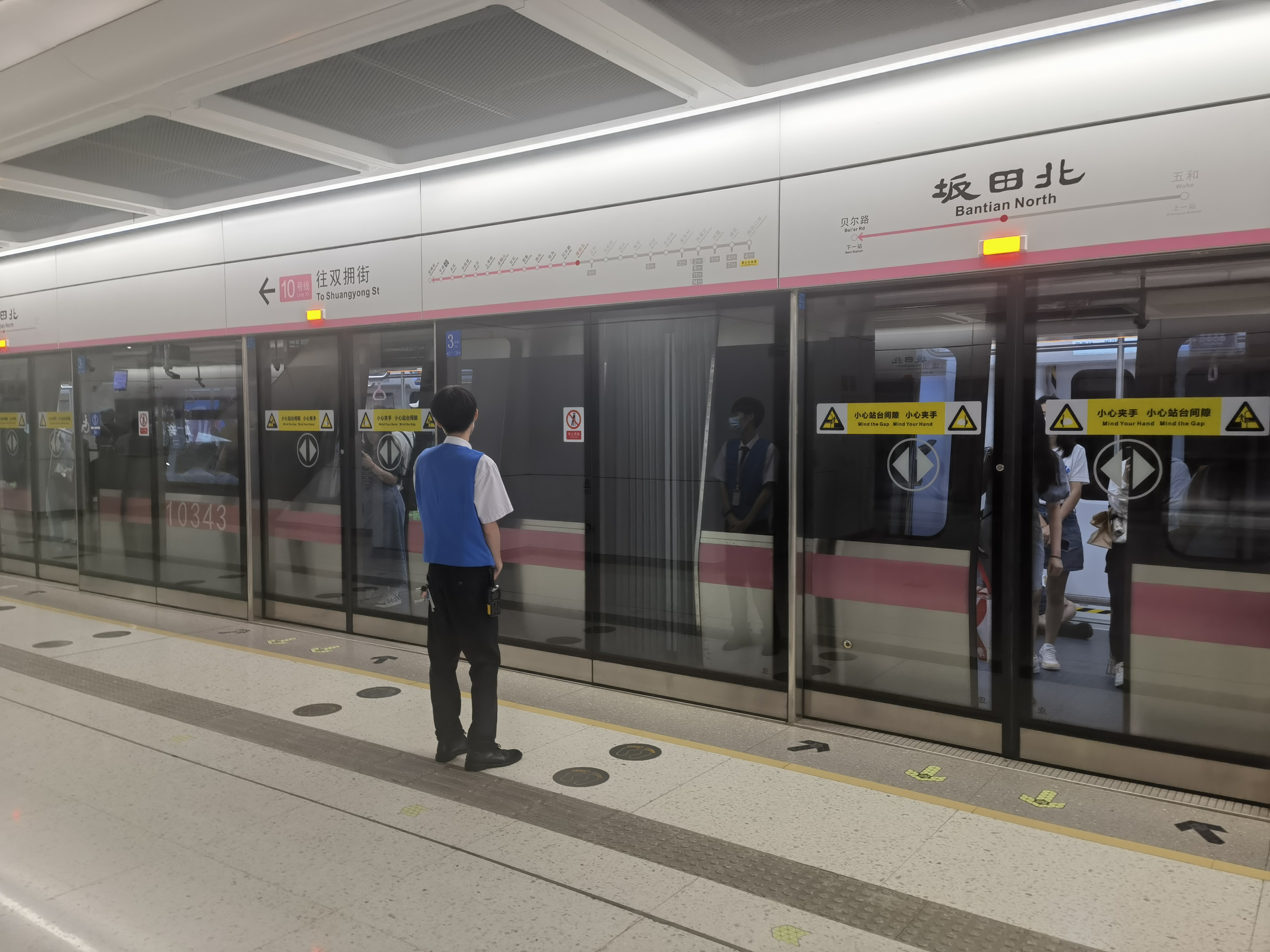

General information
- Location: Longgang District, Shenzhen, Guangdong; China
- Operated by: SZMC (Shenzhen Metro Group)
- Line: Line 10
- Platforms: 2 (1 island platform)
- Tracks: 2

Construction
- Structure type: Underground
- Accessible: Yes

History
- Opened: 18 August 2020

Services
| Preceding station | Shenzhen Metro | Following station |
|---|---|---|
| Bei'er Road towards Shuangyong Street | Line 10 | Wuhe towards Futian Checkpoint |
Location

Bantian North station (Chinese: 坂田北站; pinyin: Bǎntiánběi Zhàn) is a station on Line 10 of the Shenzhen Metro. It opened on 18 August 2020.

== Station layout ==
| G | - | Exit |
| B1F; Concourse | Lobby | Customer Service, Shops, Vending machines, ATMs |
| B2F; Platforms | Platform | ← Line 10 towards Futian Checkpoint (Wuhe) |
| B2F; Platforms | Island platform, doors will open on the left |
| B2F; Platforms | Platform | → Line 10 towards Shuangyong Street (Bei'er Road) → |

== Exits ==
| Exit | Destination |
|---|---|
| Exit A | West Side of Jihua Rd (S) |
| Exit B | East Side of Jihua Rd (N) |
