= Huawei station (Shenzhen Metro) =

Metro station in Shenzhen, Guangdong, China

Huawei 华为
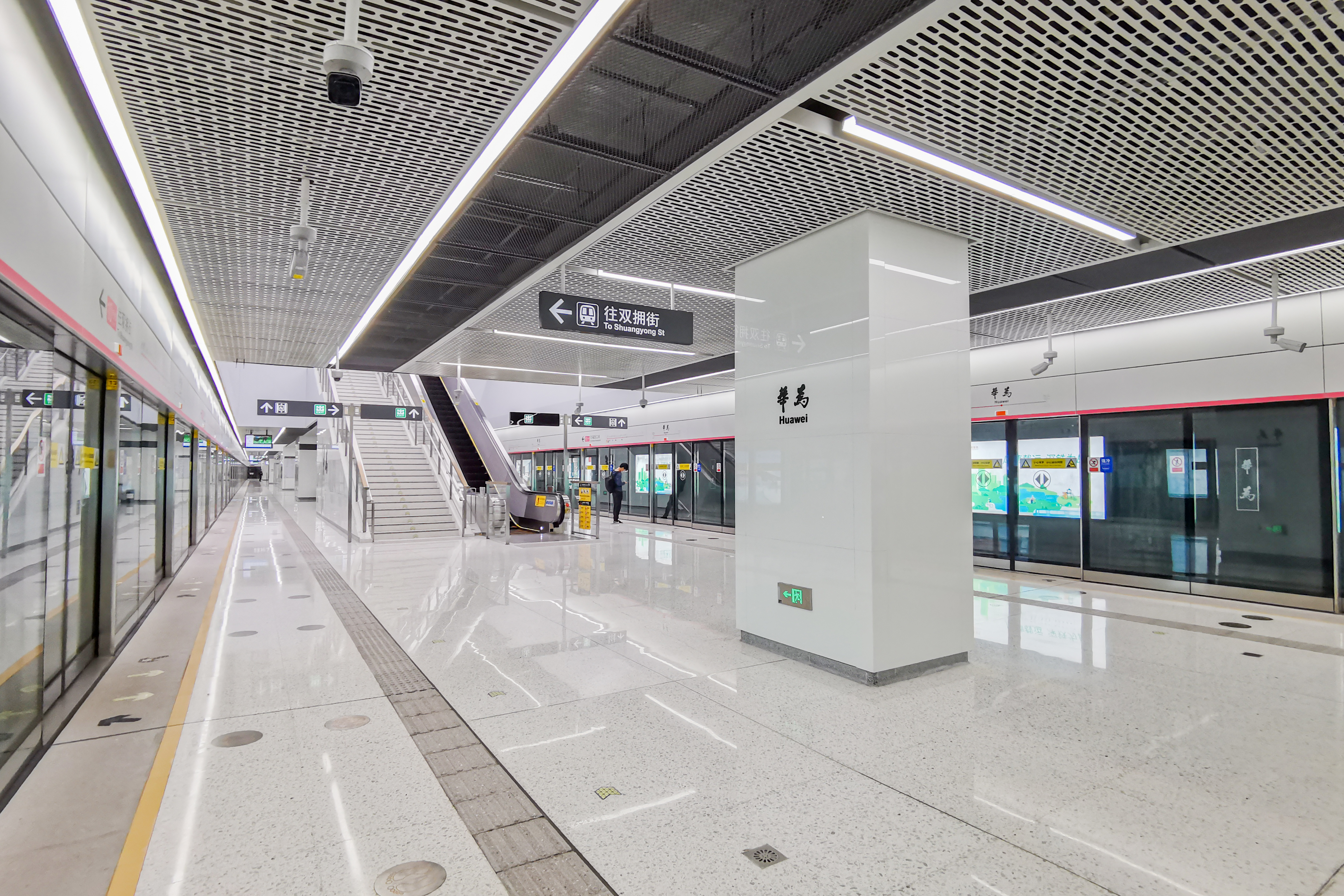
- Platform in November 2020

General information
- Location: Longgang District, Shenzhen, Guangdong; China
- Coordinates: 22.653064°N 114.061985°E
- Operated by: SZMC (Shenzhen Metro Group)
- Line: Line 10
- Platforms: 2 (1 island platform)
- Tracks: 2

Construction
- Structure type: Underground
- Accessible: Yes

History
- Opened: 18 August 2020

Services
Preceding station	Shenzhen Metro	Following station
Gangtou towards Shuangyong Street	Line 10	Bei'er Road towards Futian Checkpoint
Location

Huawei station (Chinese: 华为站; pinyin: Huáwéi Zhàn) is a station on Line 10 of the Shenzhen Metro. It opened on 18 August 2020. Huawei station is located right next to Huawei Shenzhen Base. In 2018 it was forbidden by the Shenzhen Bureau of Planning and Natural Resources to name stations after corporate entities, however since the plans for the line were already approved in 2016, the name 'Huawei' was still allowed. Upon opening of the stations, it proved a popular spot for people to take pictures with their phones in front of the station sign.

== Station layout ==
G	-	Exit
B1F; Concourse	Lobby	Customer Service, Shops, Vending machines, ATMs
B2F; Platforms	Platform	← Line 10 towards Futian Checkpoint (Bei'er Road)
B2F; Platforms	Island platform, doors will open on the left
B2F; Platforms	Platform	→ Line 10 towards Shuangyong Street (Gangtou) →

== Exits ==
Exit	Destination
Exit A	East Side of Banxuegang Blvd (S), East Side of Jiaxian Rd (S)
Exit B	East Side of Banxuegang Blvd (N), East Side of Jiaxian Rd (N), Xiangjiaotang Village
Exit C	West Side of Banxuegang Blvd (N), Matishan Village
Exit D	West Side of Jiaxian Rd (N), East Side of Julifuren Blvd (N), Matishan New Village, Shenzhen Huawei Bantian Business Area (Zone J)
Exit E	West Side of Banxuegang Blvd (S), East Side of Julifuren Blvd (S), West Side of Jiaxian Rd (S), Huawei Baicaoyuan, Shenzhen Huawei Bantian Business Area (Zone K)
Exit F	West Side of Banxuegang Blvd (S), West Side of Longping Rd (N)
