= Xuexiang station =

Metro station in Shenzhen, China

Coordinates: 22°32′58″N 114°7′22″E

Xuexiang 雪象
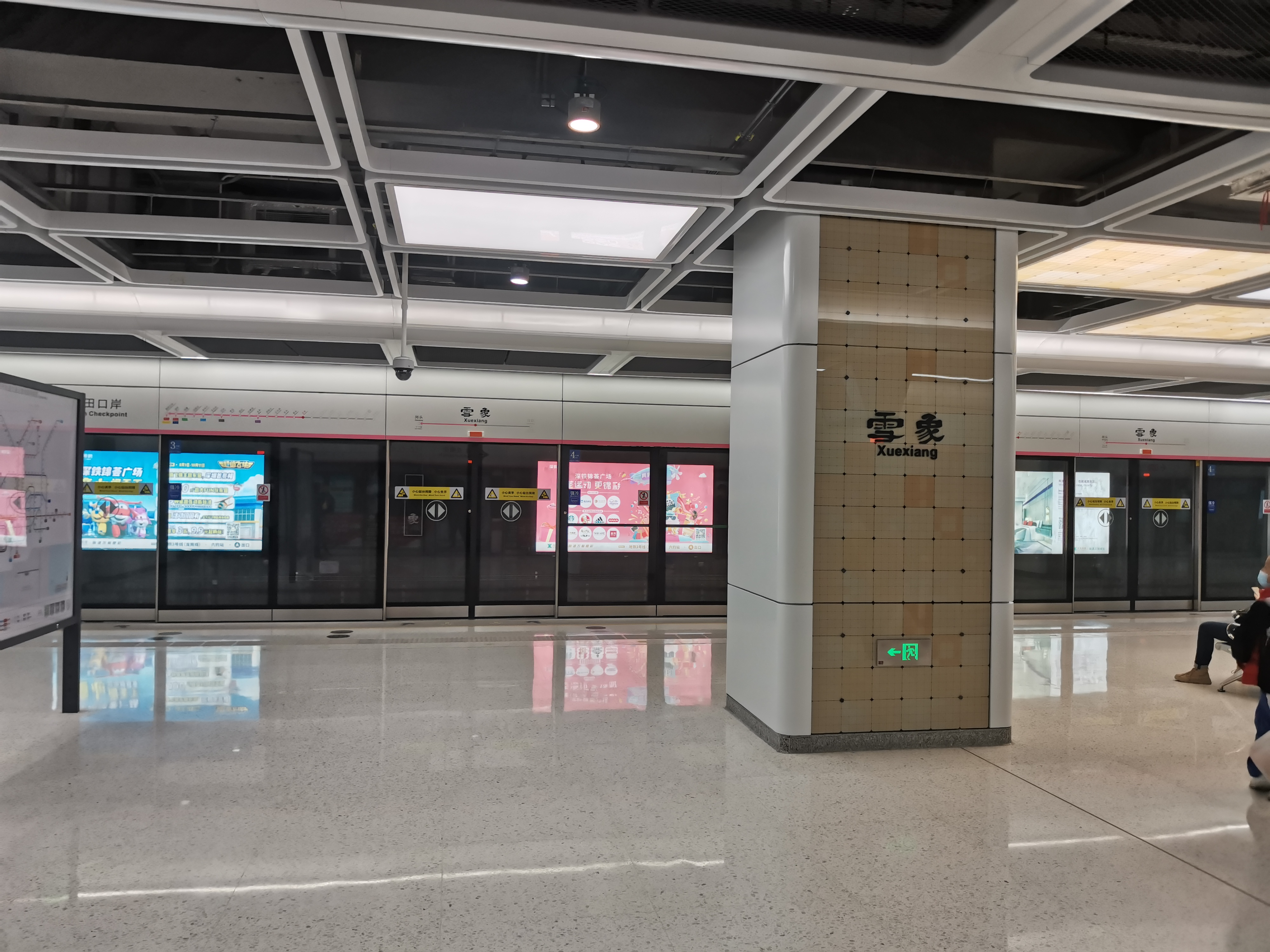

General information
- Location: Longgang District, Shenzhen, Guangdong; China
- Operated by: SZMC (Shenzhen Metro Group)
- Line: Line 10
- Platforms: 2 (1 island platform)
- Tracks: 2

Construction
- Structure type: Underground
- Accessible: Yes

History
- Opened: 18 August 2020

Services
| Preceding station | Shenzhen Metro | Following station |
|---|---|---|
| Gankeng towards Shuangyong Street | Line 10 | Gangtou towards Futian Checkpoint |
Location

Xuexiang station (Chinese: 雪象站; pinyin: Xuěxiàng Zhàn) is a station on Line 10 of the Shenzhen Metro. It opened on 18 August 2020.

== Station layout ==
| G | - | Exit |
| B1F; Concourse | Lobby | Customer Service, Shops, Vending machines, ATMs |
| B2F; Platforms | Platform | ← Line 10 towards Futian Checkpoint (Gangtou) |
| B2F; Platforms | Island platform, doors will open on the left |
| B2F; Platforms | Platform | → Line 10 towards Shuangyong Street (Gankeng) → |

== Exits ==
| Exit | Destination |
|---|---|
| Exit A | South Side of Zhonghao 1st Road (W), Bantian School Affiliated to Normal College of Shenzhen University, South Side of Baoji Road |
| Exit B | West Side of Zhonghao 1st Road (S) |
| Exit C | South Side of Zhonghao 2nd Road |
| Exit D | North Side of Zhonghao 1st Road (E), Chengxiang Garden Phase II |
| Exit E | North Side of Zhonghao 1st Road (W), Chengxiang Garden Phase I, North Side of Baoji Road |
