= Nankeng station =

Metro station in Shenzhen, China

Coordinates: 22.613321°N 114.055438°E

Nankeng 南坑
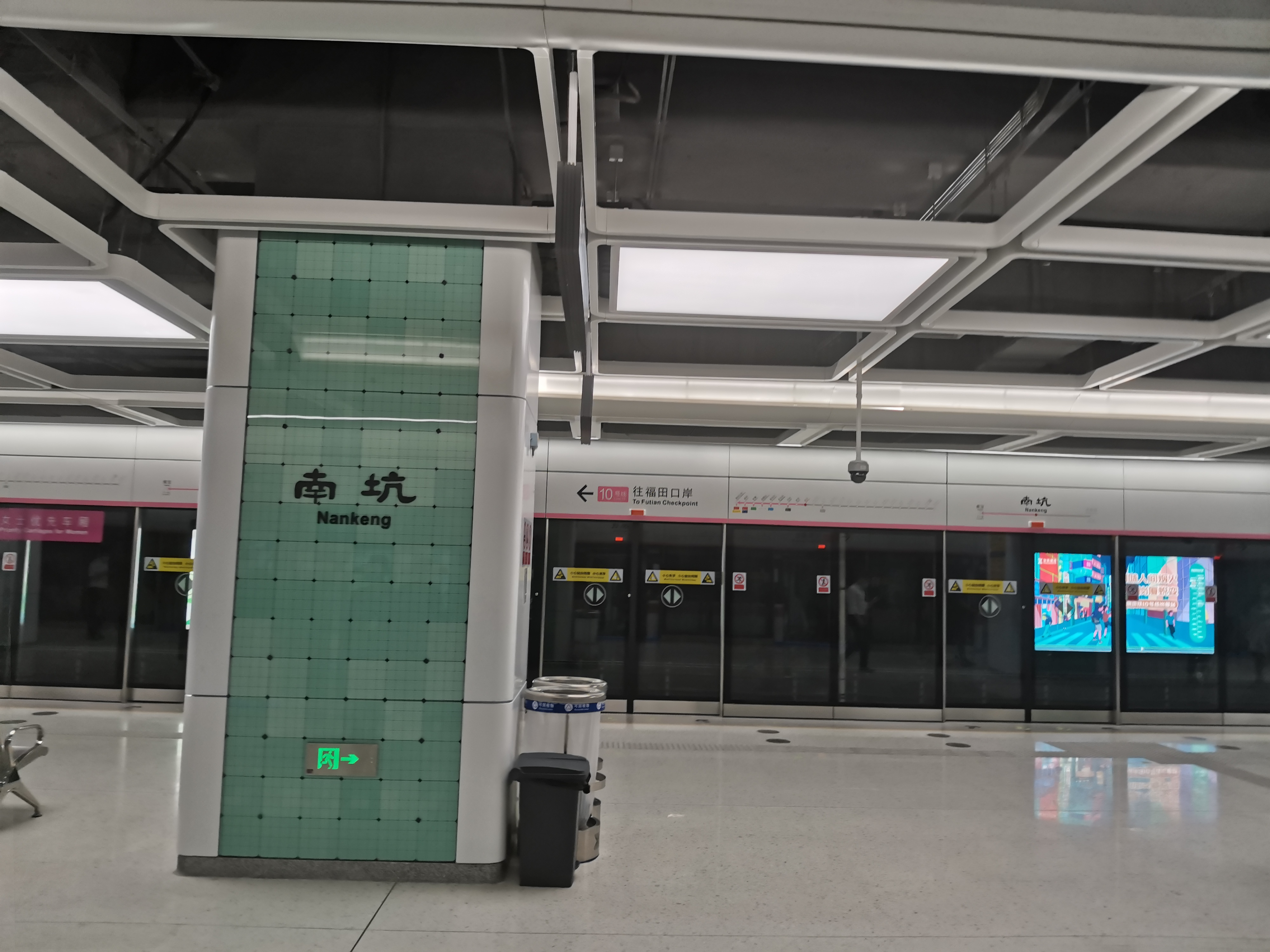

General information
- Location: Longgang District, Shenzhen, Guangdong; China
- Operated by: SZMC (Shenzhen Metro Group)
- Line: Line 10
- Platforms: 2 (1 island platform)
- Tracks: 2

Construction
- Structure type: Underground
- Accessible: Yes

History
- Opened: 18 August 2020

Services
Preceding station	Shenzhen Metro	Following station
Guangyayuan towards Shuangyong Street	Line 10	Yabao towards Futian Checkpoint
Location

Nankeng station (Chinese: 南坑站; pinyin: Nánkēng Zhàn) is a station on Line 10 of the Shenzhen Metro. It opened on 18 August 2020.

== Station layout ==
G	-	Exit
B1F; Concourse	Lobby	Customer Service, Shops, Vending machines, ATMs
B2F; Platforms	Platform	← Line 10 towards Futian Checkpoint (Yabao)
B2F; Platforms	Island platform, doors will open on the left
B2F; Platforms	Platform	→ Line 10 towards Shuangyong Street (Guangyayuan) →

== Exits ==
Exit	Destination
Exit A	East Side of Wuhe Blvd (S), Hongyinyuan, Tianjing Villa, Xingguang Zhiyue Garden, Xingjingyuan
Exit B	East Side of Wuhe Blvd (N), Nankeng North Road, Jiahe Garden, Nankeng Market, Nankeng Village
Exit C	West Side of Wuhe Blvd (N), Long'an Garden
