= Hehua station =

Metro station in Shenzhen, Guangdong, China

Hehua 禾花
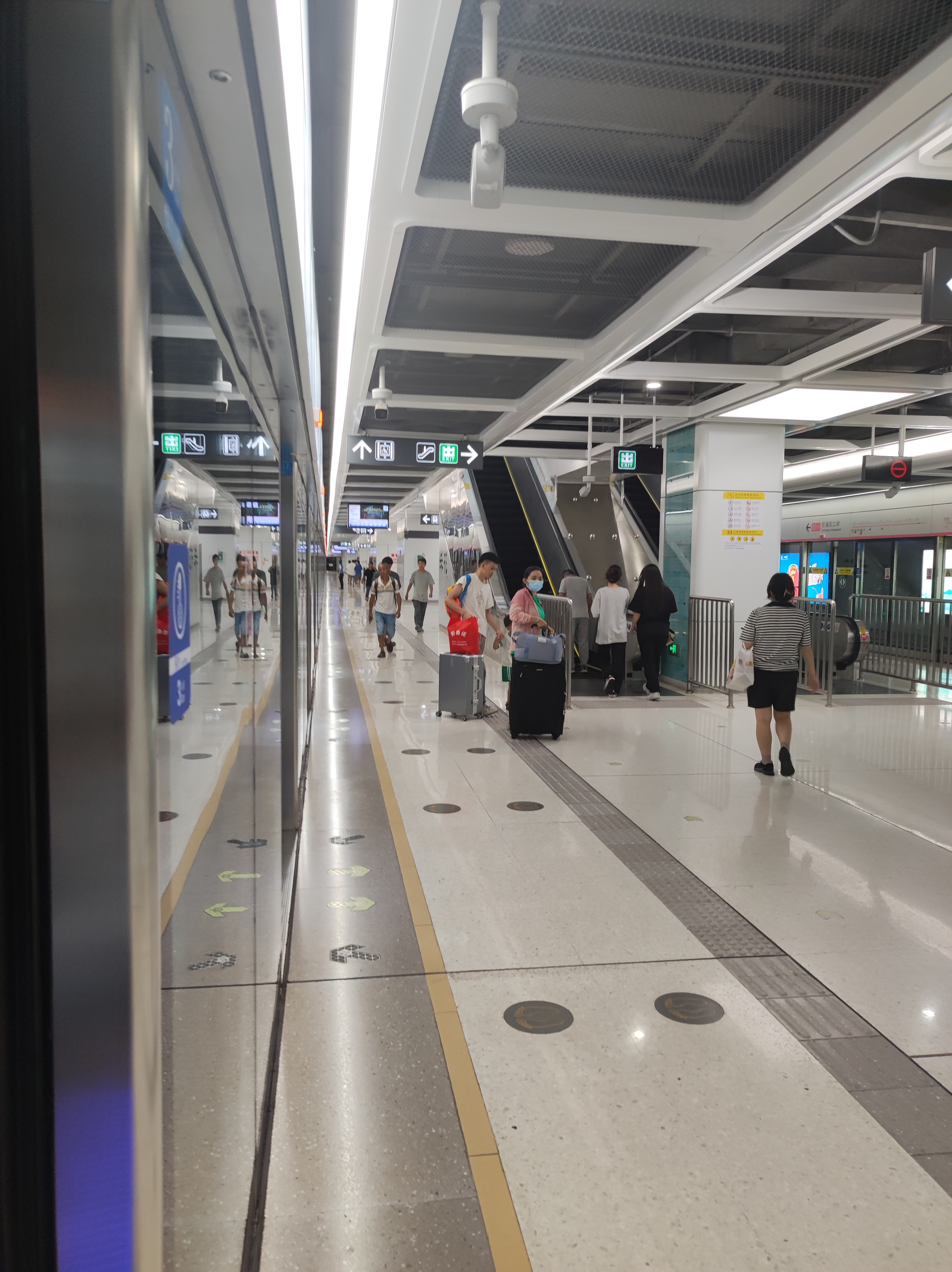
- Platform

General information
- Location: Longgang District, Shenzhen, Guangdong; China
- Coordinates: 22.688700°N 114.115935°E
- Operated by: SZMC (Shenzhen Metro Group)
- Line: Line 10
- Platforms: 2 (1 island platform)
- Tracks: 2

Construction
- Structure type: Underground
- Accessible: Yes

History
- Opened: 18 August 2020

Services
Preceding station	Shenzhen Metro	Following station
Pinghu towards Shuangyong Street	Line 10	Huanancheng towards Futian Checkpoint
Location

Hehua station (Chinese: 禾花站; pinyin: Héhuā Zhàn) is a station on Line 10 of the Shenzhen Metro. It opened on August 18, 2020.

== Station layout ==
G	-	Exit
B1F; Concourse	Lobby	Customer Service, Shops, Vending machines, ATMs
B2F; Platforms	Platform	← Line 10 towards Futian Checkpoint (Huanancheng)
B2F; Platforms	Island platform, doors will open on the left
B2F; Platforms	Platform	→ Line 10 towards Shuangyong Street (Pinghu) →

== Exits ==
Exit	Destination
Exit A	East Side of Pingji Boulevard (S), South Side of Jiaye Road
Exit B	East Side of Pingji Boulevard (N), North Side of Jiaye Road
Exit C	West Side of Pingji Boulevard (S), South Side of Jiaye Road
