= Yabao station =

Metro station in Shenzhen, China

Coordinates: 22.606463°N 114.055105°E

Yabao 雅宝
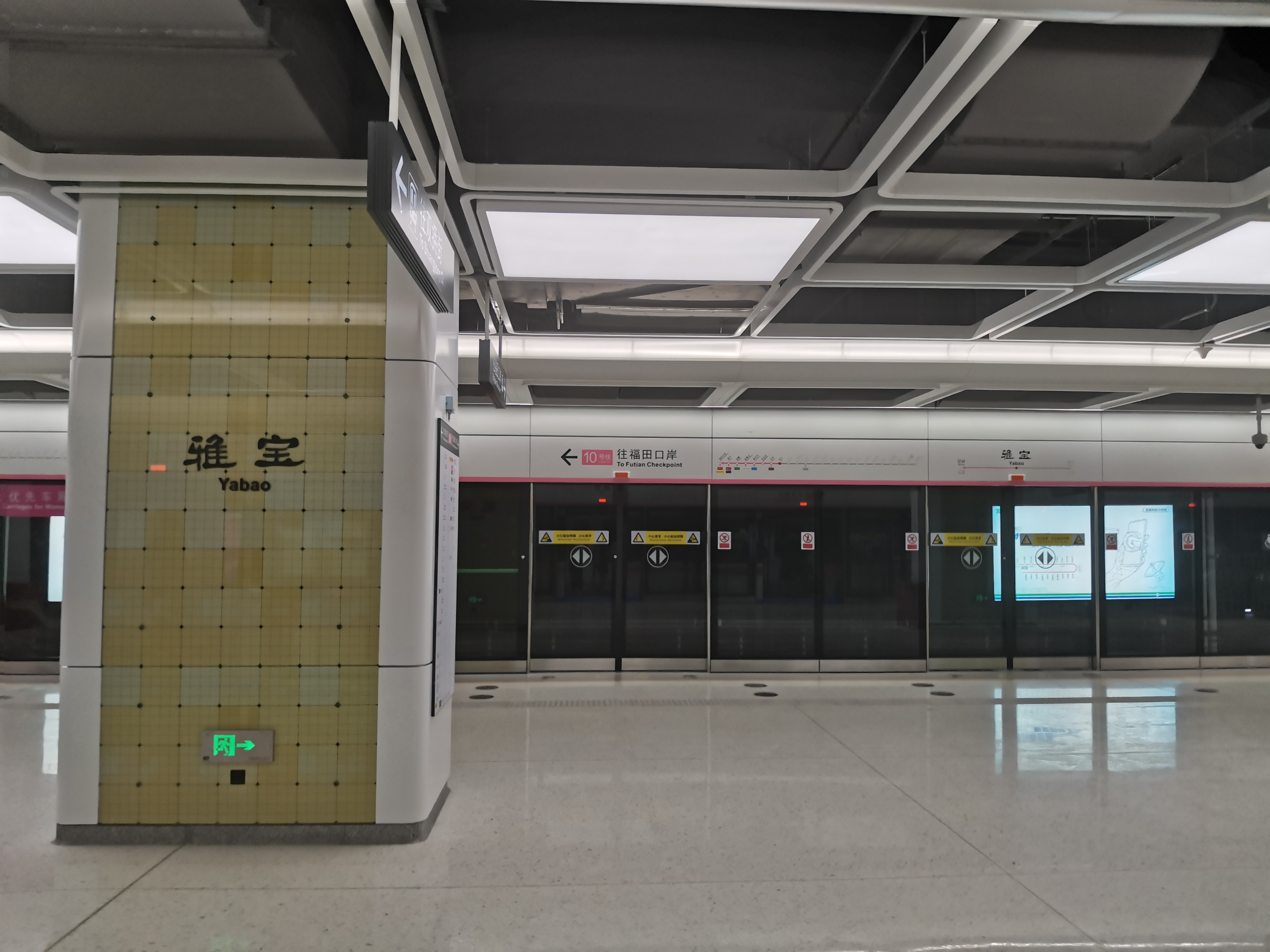

General information
- Location: Longgang District, Shenzhen, Guangdong; China
- Operated by: SZMC (Shenzhen Metro Group)
- Line: Line 10
- Platforms: 2 (1 island platform)
- Tracks: 2

Construction
- Structure type: Underground
- Accessible: Yes

History
- Opened: 18 August 2020

Services
Preceding station	Shenzhen Metro	Following station
Nankeng towards Shuangyong Street	Line 10	Maling towards Futian Checkpoint
Location

Yabao station (Chinese: 雅宝站; pinyin: Yǎbǎo Zhàn) is a station on Line 10 of the Shenzhen Metro. It opened on 18 August 2020.

== Station layout ==
G	-	Exit
B1F; Concourse	Lobby	Customer Service, Shops, Vending machines, ATMs
B2F; Platforms	Platform	← Line 10 towards Futian Checkpoint (Maling)
B2F; Platforms	Island platform, doors will open on the left
B2F; Platforms	Platform	→ Line 10 towards Shuangyong Street (Nankeng) →

== Exits ==
Exit		Destination
Exit A1		South Side of Wuhe Blvd (E)
Exit B		South Side of Yanan Rd (E)
Exit C	C1	South Side of Yanan Rd (W)
Exit C	C2	South Side of Yanan Rd (W)
Exit D		Reserved
Exit E	E1	North Side of Wuhe Blvd (E)
Exit E	E2	North Side of Wuhe Blvd (E)
