= Gankeng station =

Metro station in Shenzhen, Guangdong, China

Coordinates: 22°32′58″N 114°7′22″E

Gankeng 甘坑
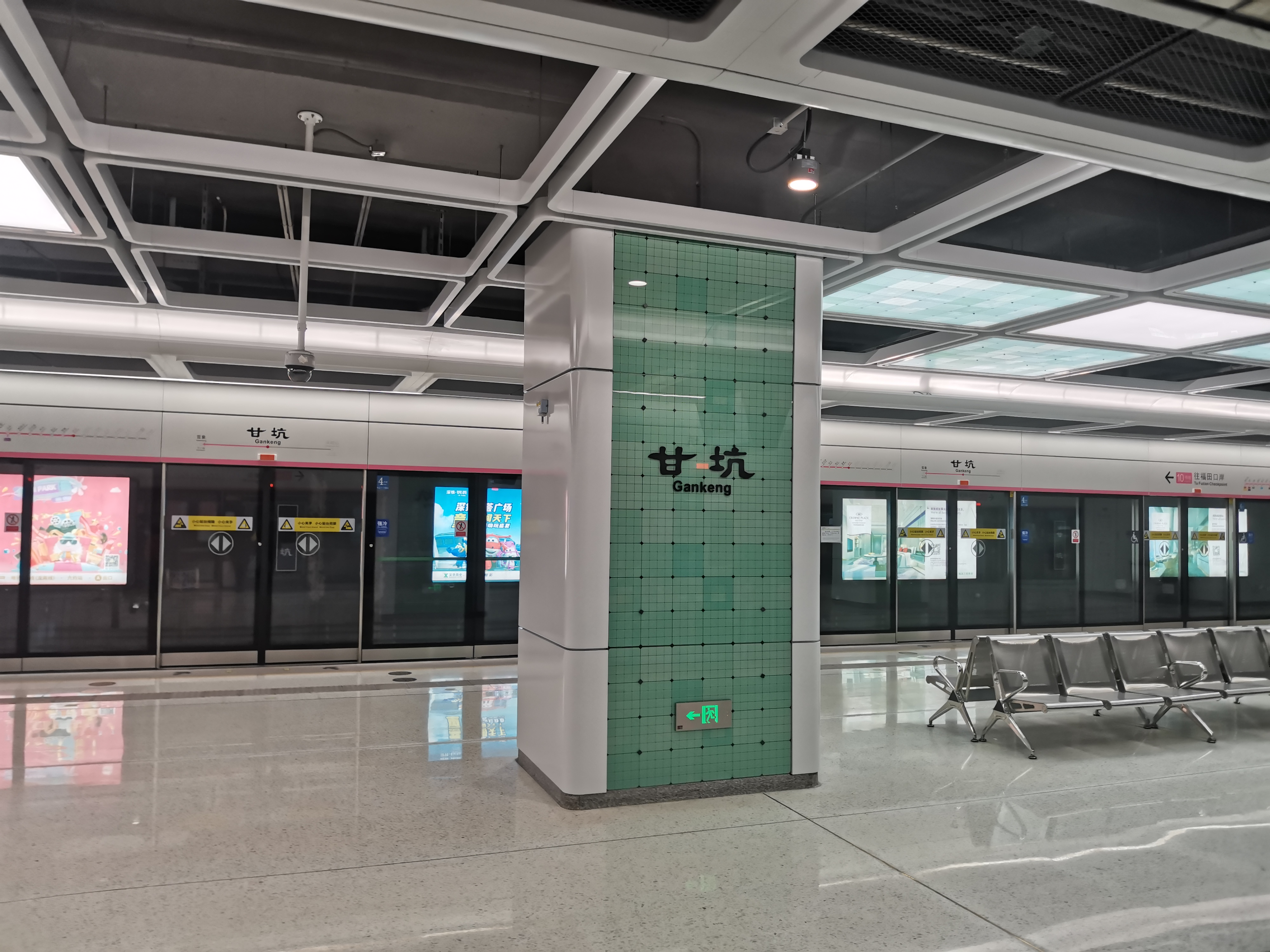

General information
- Location: Longgang District, Shenzhen, Guangdong; China
- Operated by: SZMC (Shenzhen Metro Group)
- Line: Line 10
- Platforms: 2 (1 island platform)
- Tracks: 2

Construction
- Structure type: Underground
- Accessible: Yes

History
- Opened: 18 August 2020

Services
Preceding station	Shenzhen Metro	Following station
Liangmao Hill towards Shuangyong Street	Line 10	Xuexiang towards Futian Checkpoint
Location

Gankeng station (Chinese: 甘坑站; pinyin: Gānkēng Zhàn) is a station on Line 10 of the Shenzhen Metro. It opened on August 18, 2020.

== Station layout ==
G	-	Exit
B1F; Concourse	Lobby	Customer Service, Shops, Vending machines, ATMs
B2F; Platforms	Platform	← Line 10 towards Futian Checkpoint (Xuexiang)
B2F; Platforms	Island platform, doors will open on the left
B2F; Platforms	Platform	→ Line 10 towards Shuangyong Street (Liangmao Hill) →

== Exits ==
Exit	Destination
Exit A	Xiufeng Industrial City
Exit B	Jiaheyuan
Exit C	Xiufeng Industrial City
