= Gangtou station =

Gangtou station may refer to the following stations:

- Gangtou station (Shenzhen Metro), a station on Line 10 of the Shenzhen Metro, China
- Gangtou station (Qingdao Metro), a station on Line 6 (Qingdao Metro), China
