= Wuhe station =

Metro station in Shenzhen, China

Coordinates: 22°37′36″N 114°3′39″E

Wuhe 五和
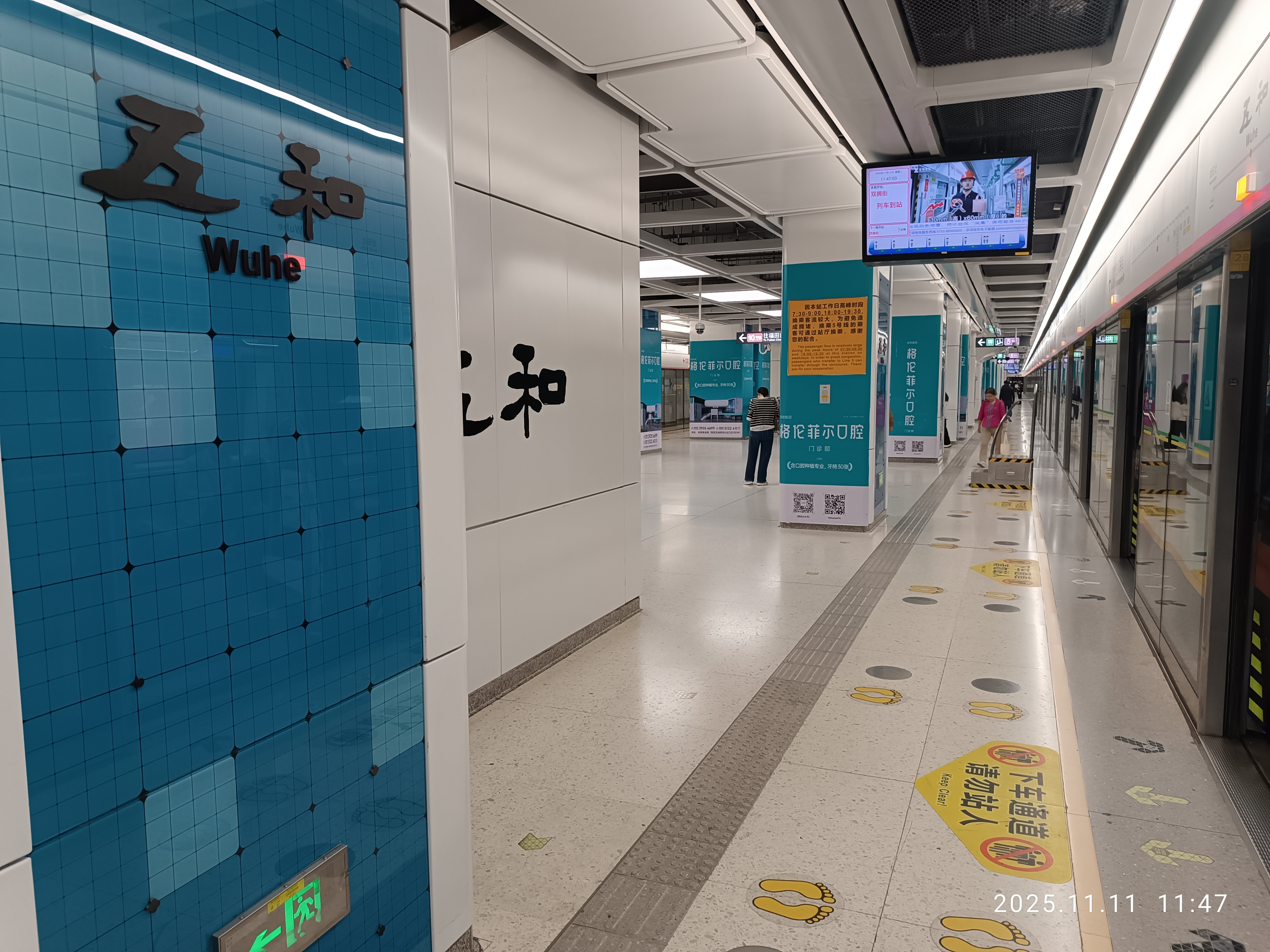
- Line 10 Platforms

General information
- Location: Longgang District, Shenzhen, Guangdong; China
- Operated by: SZMC (Shenzhen Metro Group)
- Lines: Line 5; Line 10
- Platforms: 4 (2 island platforms)
- Tracks: 4

Construction
- Structure type: Underground
- Accessible: Yes

History
- Opened: 22 June 2011 (Line 5); 18 August 2020 (Line 10)

Services
Preceding station	Shenzhen Metro	Following station
Bantian towards Grand Theater	Line 5	Minzhi towards Chiwan
Bantian North towards Shuangyong Street	Line 10	Guangyayuan towards Futian Checkpoint
Location

Wuhe station (Chinese: 五和站; pinyin: Wǔhé Zhàn; Jyutping: ng^{5} wo^{4} zaam^{6}) is an interchange station for Line 5 and Line 10 of the Shenzhen Metro. This station is located under the intersection of Wuhe Boulevard and Bulong Road. Line 5 platforms opened on 22 June 2011 and Line 10 platforms opened on 18 August 2020.

== Station layout ==
G	-	Exit
B1F; Concourse	Lobby	Customer Service, Shops, Vending machines, ATMs
B2F; Platforms	Platform 1	← 5 towards Chiwan (Minzhi)
B2F; Platforms	Island platform, doors will open on the left
B2F; Platforms	Platform 2	→ 5 towards Grand Theater (Bantian) →
B3F; Platforms	Platform	← 10 towards Futian Checkpoint (Guangyayuan)
B3F; Platforms	Island platform, doors will open on the left
B3F; Platforms	Platform	→ 10 towards Shuangyong Street (Bantian North) →

== Exits ==
Exit	Image	Destination
A		West Side of Wuhe Blvd (S), South Side of Bulong Rd (W), Wonderland
B		East Side of Wuhe Blvd (S), South Side of Bulong Rd (E), 12 Oaks Manor, Hekan Village, Bantian Private-run Market
C		East Side of Wuhe Blvd (N), North Side of Bulong Rd (E), Max City, Changkeng Community
D		West Side of Wuhe Blvd, North Side of Bulong Rd, Bantian Police Station
D 1		West Side of Wuhe Blvd (N), North Side of Bulong Rd (W)
H		East Side of Wuhe Blvd (S), Hekan Village (Hekancun)

== Gallery ==
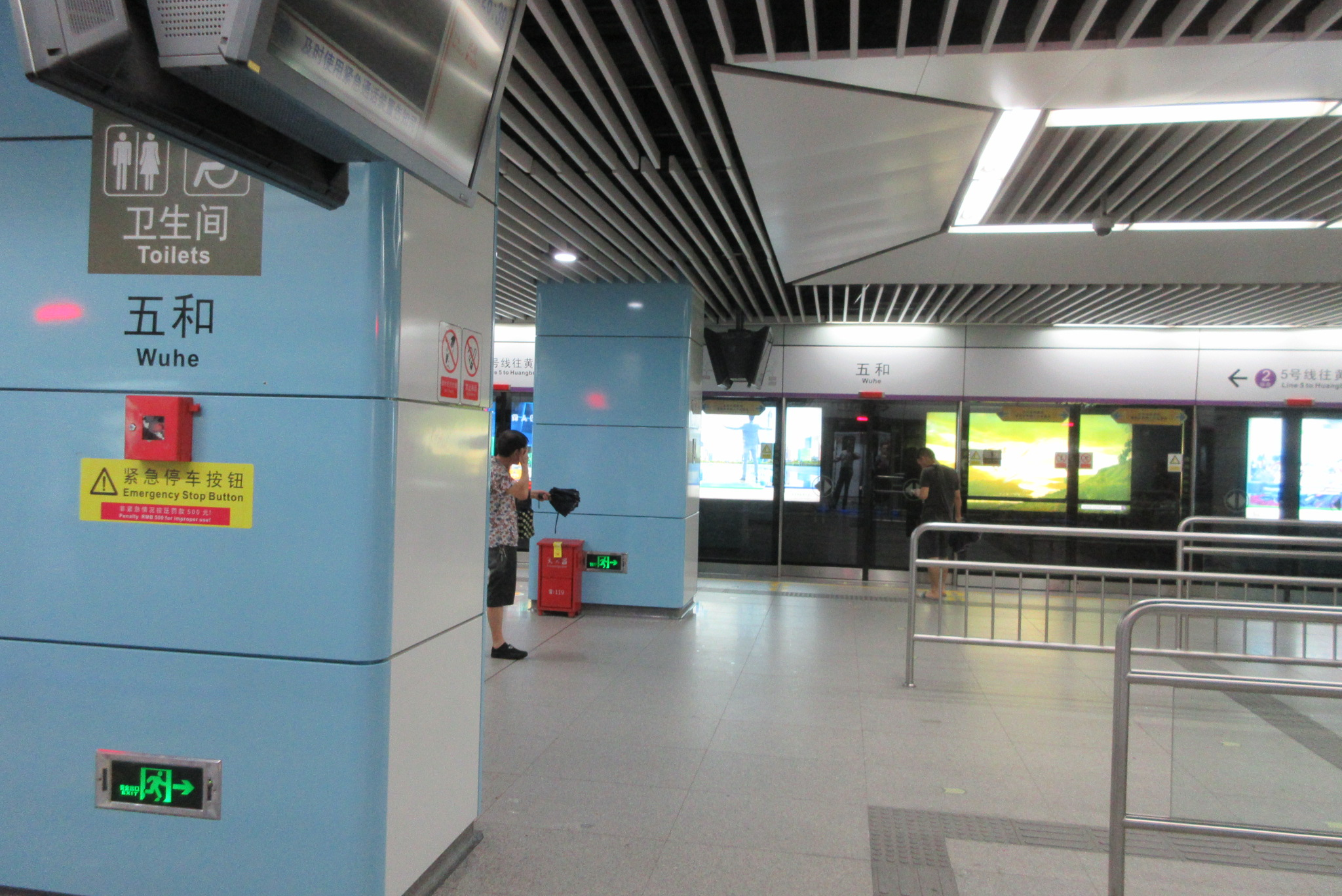
Line 5 Platform (2017)

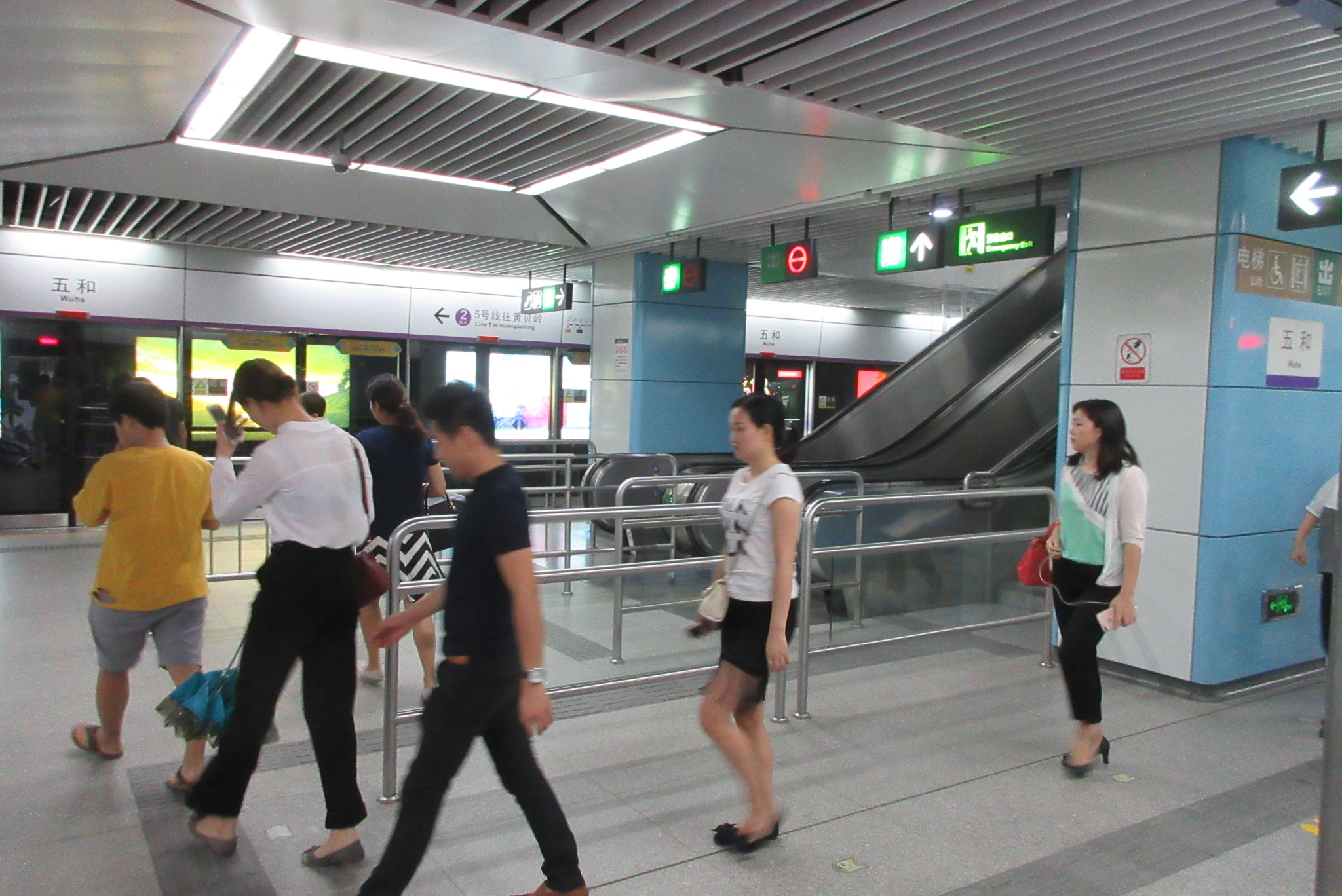
Line 5 Platform with Escalators (2017)

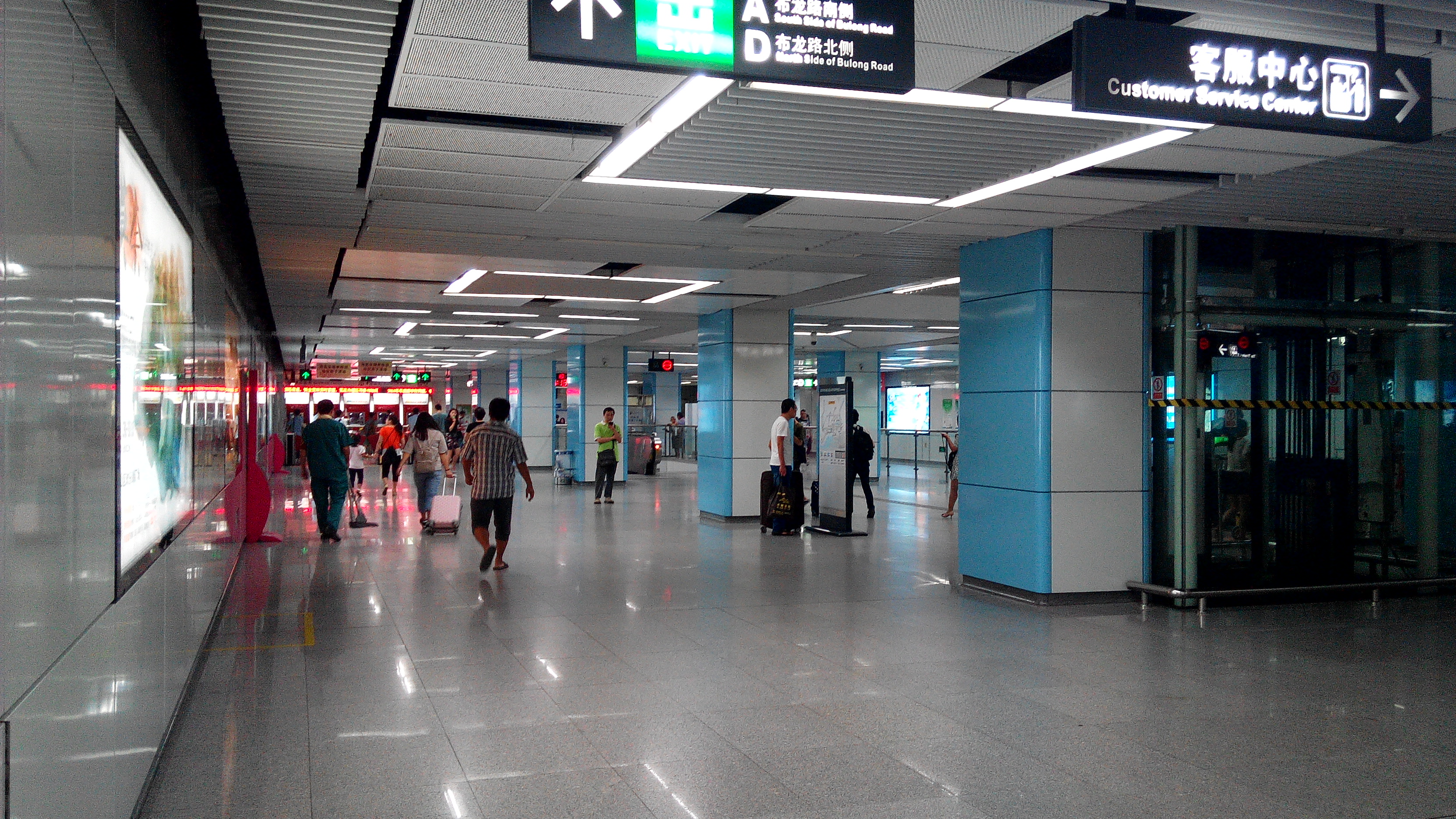
Line 5 Concourse (2016)

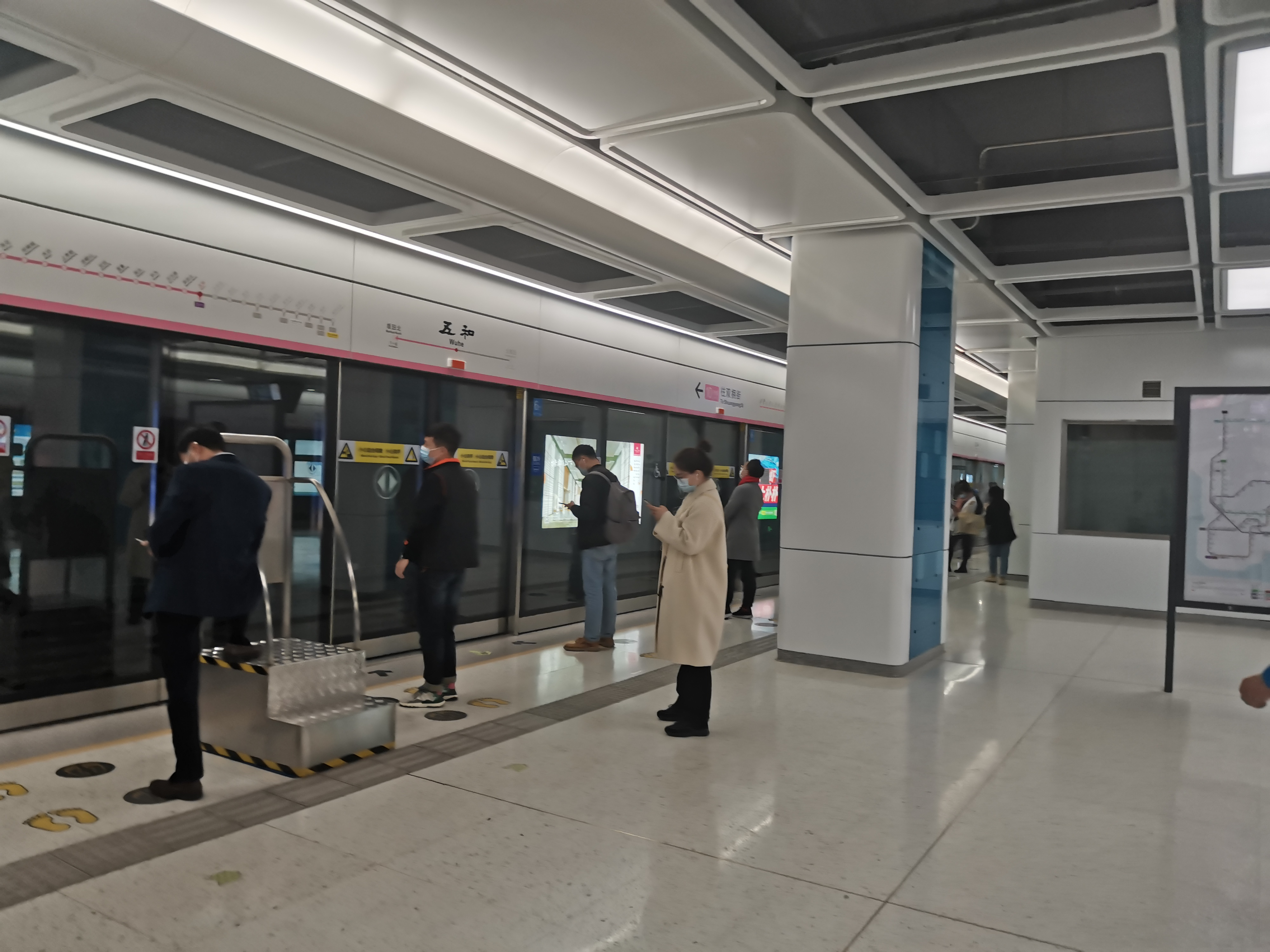
Line 10 Platform

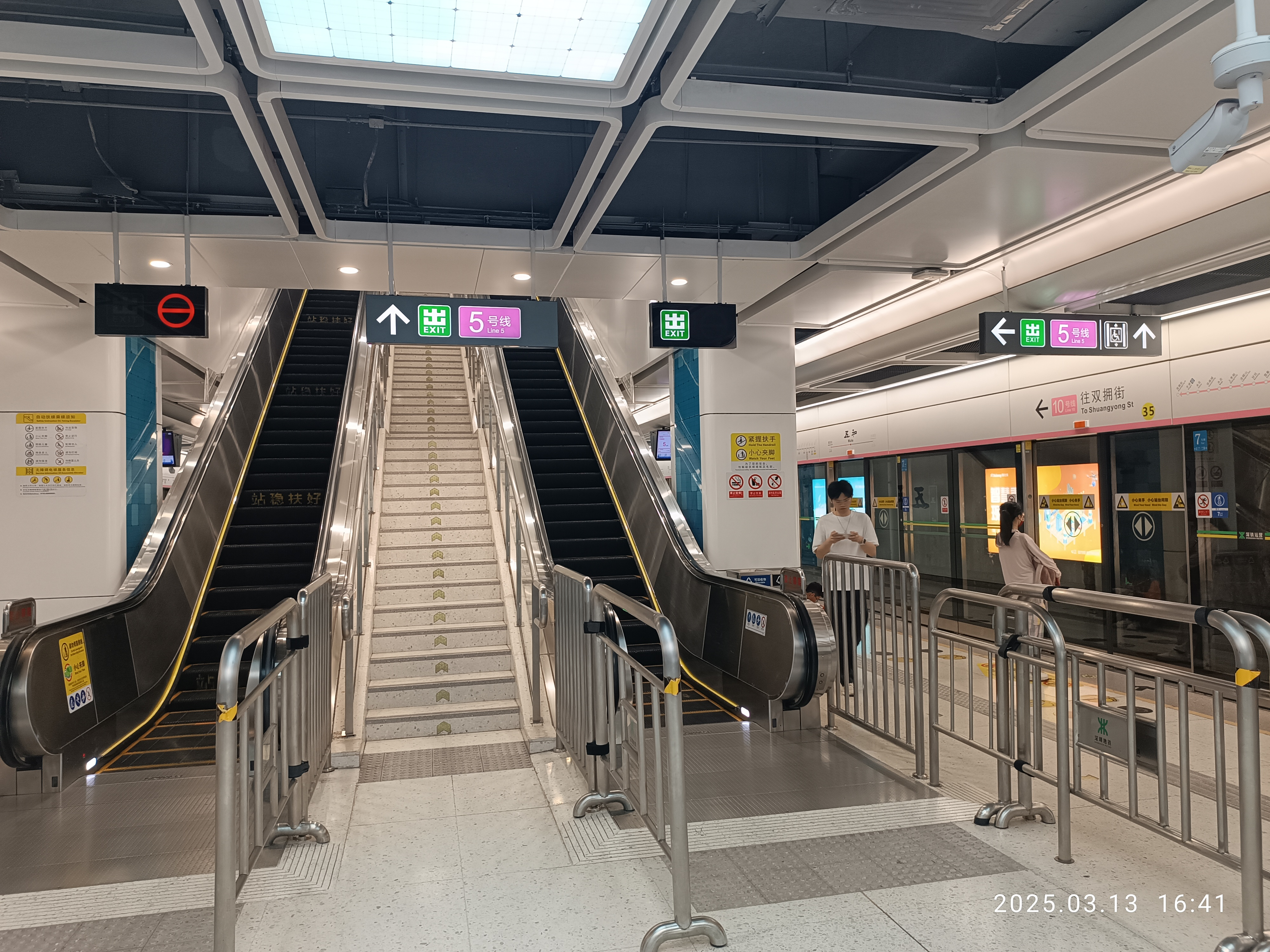
Line 10 Platforms with Escalators

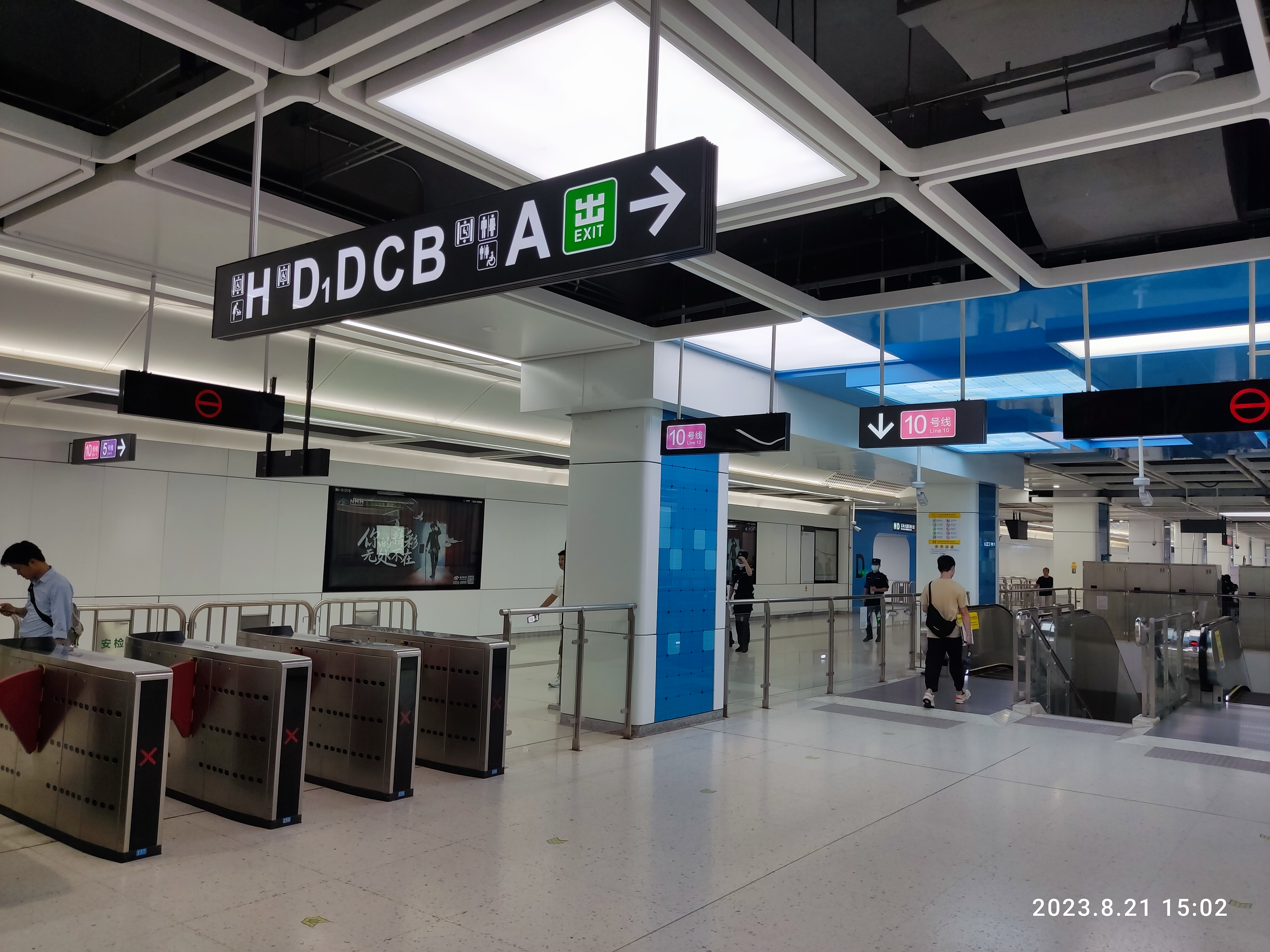
Line 10 Concourse

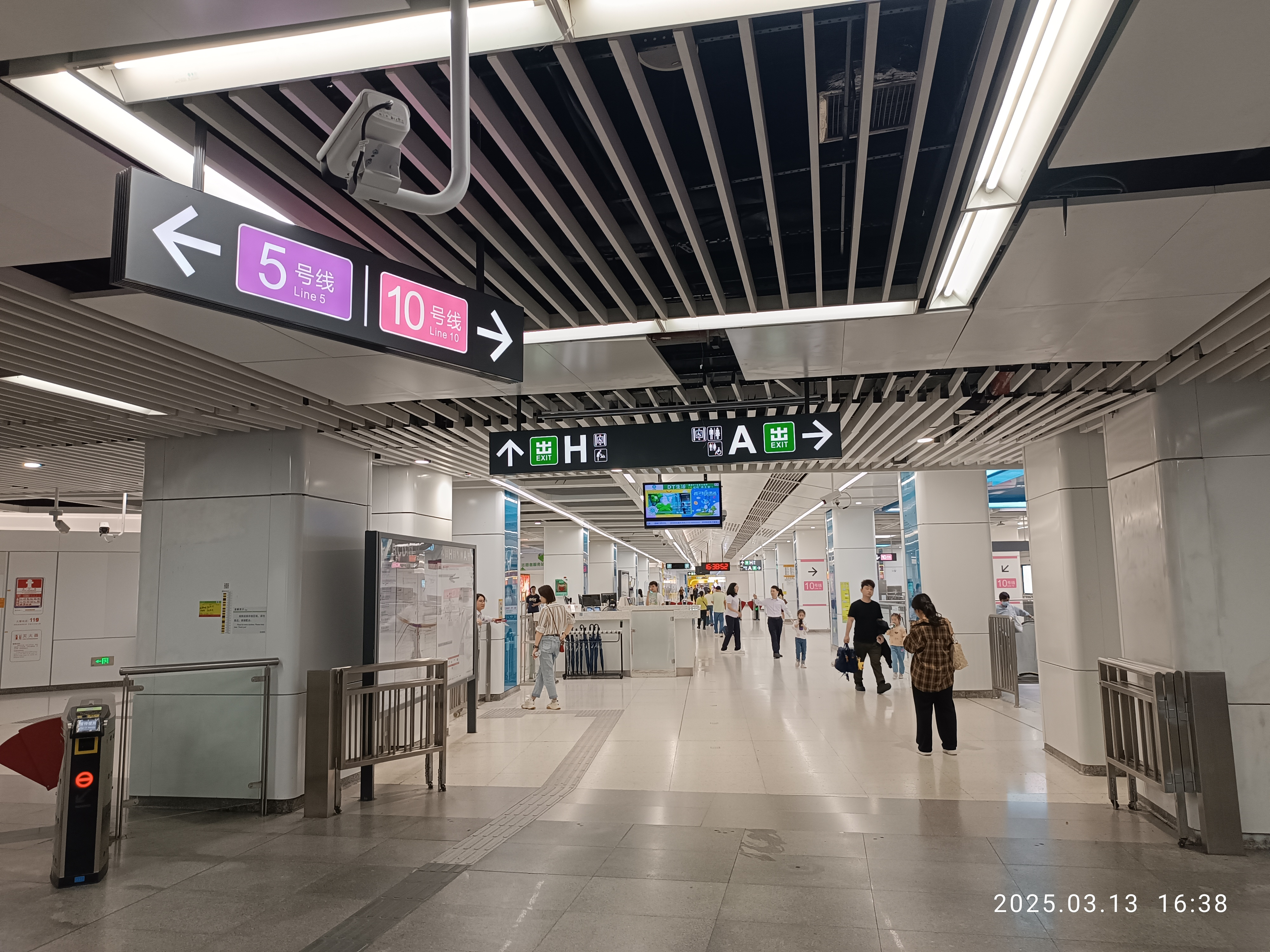
Connection Concourse
