= Gangtou station (Shenzhen Metro) =

Station of the Shenzhen Metro

Coordinates: 22°32′58″N 114°7′22″E

Gangtou 岗头
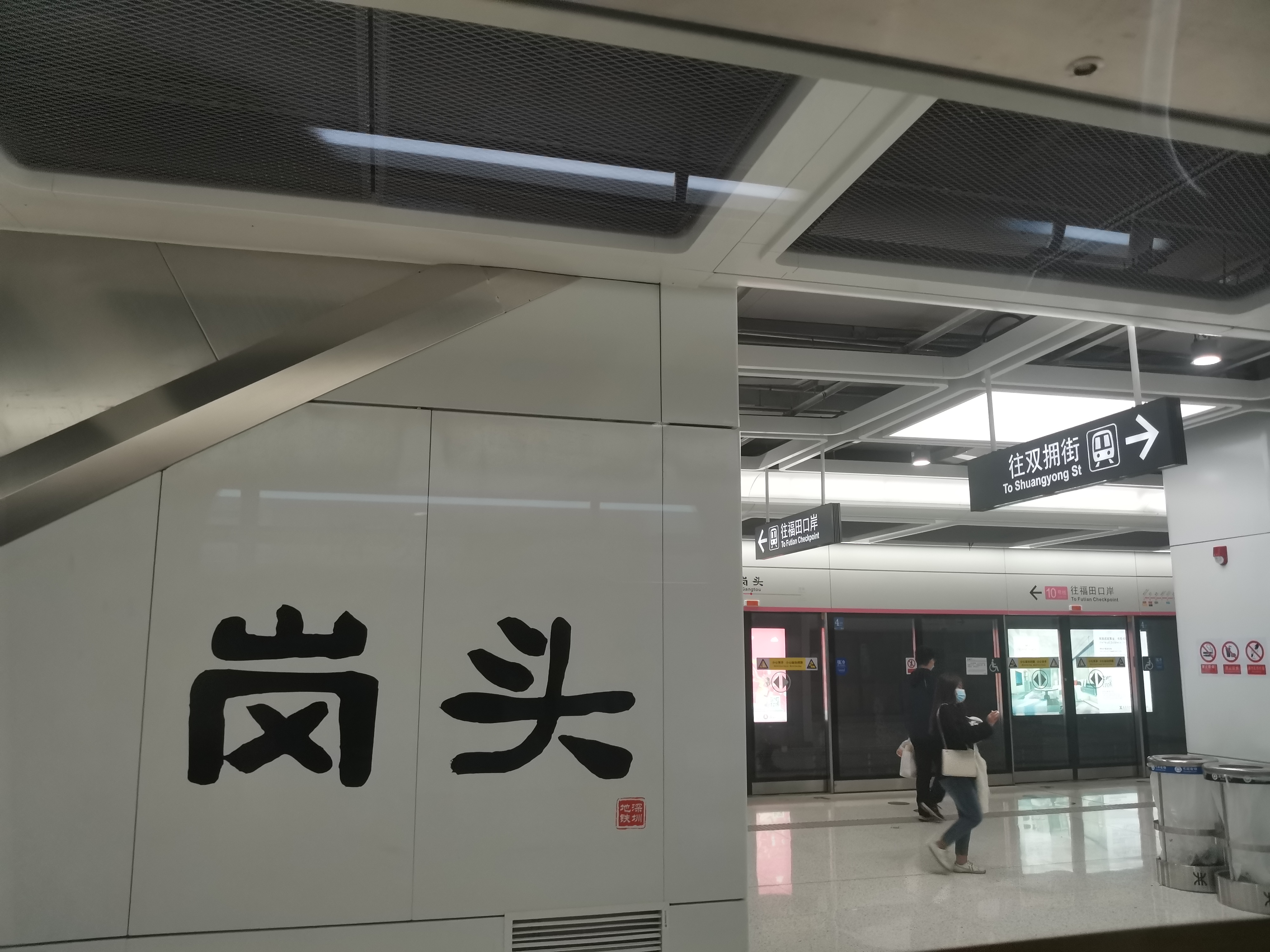

General information
- Location: Longgang District, Shenzhen, Guangdong; China
- Operated by: SZMC (Shenzhen Metro Group)
- Line: Line 10
- Platforms: 2 (1 island platform)
- Tracks: 2

Construction
- Structure type: Underground
- Accessible: Yes

History
- Opened: 18 August 2020

Services
Preceding station	Shenzhen Metro	Following station
Xuexiang towards Shuangyong Street	Line 10	Huawei towards Futian Checkpoint
Location

Gangtou station (Chinese: 岗头站; pinyin: Gǎngtóu Zhàn) is a station on Line 10 of the Shenzhen Metro. It opened on 18 August 2020.

== Station layout ==
G	-	Exit
B1F; Concourse	Lobby	Customer Service, Shops, Vending machines, ATMs
B2F; Platforms	Platform	← Line 10 towards Futian Checkpoint (Huawei)
B2F; Platforms	Island platform, doors will open on the left
B2F; Platforms	Platform	→ Line 10 towards Shuangyong Street (Xuexiang) →

== Exits ==
Exit		Destination
Exit A		East Side of Banxuegang Blvd (S)
Exit B		South Side of Huancheng North Rd (E), Bantian School Affiliated to Normal College of Shenzhen University
Exit C	C1	West Side of Banxuegang Blvd (N), Buji Public Transport Police Station
Exit C	C2	South Side of Huancheng North Rd (W)
Exit D		West Side of Banxuegang Blvd (S), Shenzhen Public Security Bureau Traffic Police Detachment Bantian Squadron, Baogang Police Station
Exit E		West Side of Banxuegang Blvd (S)
