= Longgang, Shenzhen =

Longgang 龙岗区
- District
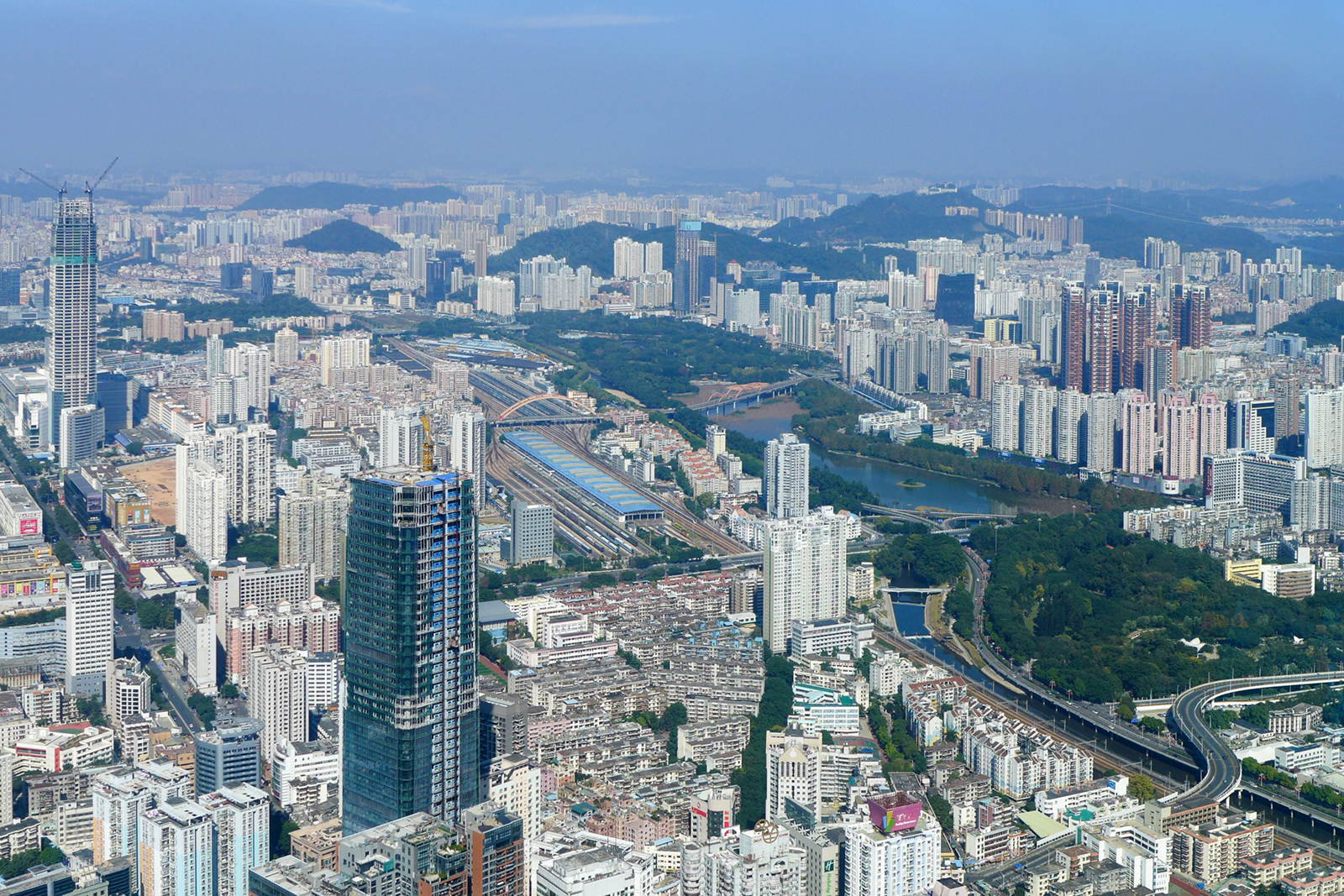
- Longgang District in 2017

- Location highlighted in orange (direct administration) and brown (Dapeng New District) within Shenzhen
- Interactive map of Longgang
- Location in Guangdong
- Coordinates: 22°43′15″N 114°14′49″E
- Country: People's Republic of China
- Province: Guangdong
- Sub-provincial city: Shenzhen

Area
  - Total: 682.87 km^{2} (263.66 sq mi)

Population (2020)
  - Total: 3,979,037
  - Density: 5,826.9/km^{2} (15,092/sq mi)
- Time zone: UTC+8 (China Standard)
- Website: www.lg.gov.cn

Longgang District (simplified Chinese: 龙岗区; traditional Chinese: 龍崗區; pinyin: Lónggǎng Qū; Jyutping: lung^{4}gong^{1} keoi^{1}) is one of the nine districts of Shenzhen, Guangdong. It is located in northeastern Shenzhen. With an area of 682.87 square kilometres (263.66 sq mi), Longgang District is one of the largest districts by area in Guangdong province. The population of the district is 3,979,037 (2020).

== Subdistricts ==
Name		Chinese (S)	Hanyu Pinyin	Canton Romanization	Population (2010)	Area (km^{2})
Longcheng Subdistrict		龙城街道	Lóngchéng Jiēdào	lung4 xing4 gai1 dou6	260,696	77.68
Longgang Subdistrict		龙岗街道	Lónggǎng Jiēdào	lung4 gong1 gai1 dou6	215,273	64.84
Henggang Subdistrict		横岗街道	Hénggǎng Jiēdào	hang1 ji2 gai1 dou6	94,801	40.40
Buji Subdistrict		布吉街道	Bùjí Jiēdào	bou3 ged1 gai1 dou6	359,770	30.58
Bantian Subdistrict		坂田街道	Bǎntián Jiēdào	ban2 tin4 gai1 dou6	221,767	28.51
Nanwan Subdistrict		南湾街道	Nánwān Jiēdào	nam4 wan1 gai1 dou6	197,431	24.68
Pinghu Subdistrict		平湖街道	Pínghú Jiēdào	ping4 wu4 gai1 dou6	228,217	41.80
Pingdi Subdistrict		坪地街道	Píngdì Jiēdào	ping4 déi6 gai1 dou6	94,765	53.14
Baolong Subdistrict		宝龙街道	Bǎolóng Jiēdào			
Jihua Subdistrict		吉华街道	Jíhuá Jiēdào			
Yuanshan Subdistrict		园山街道	Yuánshān Jiēdào			
Dapeng; New District	Dapeng Subdistrict	大鹏街道	Dàpéng Jiēdào	dai6 pang4 gai1 dou6	46,867	82.81
Dapeng; New District	Kuichong Subdistrict	葵涌街道	Kuíchōng Jiēdào	kuei4 cung1 gai1 dou6	61,105	103.90
Dapeng; New District	Nan'ao Subdistrict	南澳街道	Nán'ào Jiēdào	nam4 ou3 gai1 dou6	18,588	115.06

== History ==
Longgang was established as a district on January 1, 1993. Archaeologists discovered antiques which dated back 7,000 years ago in Xiantouling (咸头岭) of Longgang District.

== Economy ==
- Huawei is headquartered in Longgang District.
- China South International Industrial Materials City (Shenzhen) Co., Ltd.

== Education ==
Colleges and universities:

- Chinese University of Hong Kong, Shenzhen
- Shenzhen MSU-BIT University
- Shenzhen Institute of Information Technology

K-12 schools operated by the Shenzhen Municipal government include:

- Shenzhen No. 3 Senior High School (深圳市第三高级中学) Senior High School Division - Central District
- Shenzhen High School of Science (深圳科学高中) - Bantian Subdistrict
- Shenzhen Institute of Technology (深圳技师学院) - Wulian Community, Longcheng Subdistrict
- Shenzhen Sports School (深圳体育运动学校)
- Shenzhen Yuanping Special Education School (深圳元平特殊教育学校) - Buji Subdistrict

District schools:

- Longcheng High School

== Tourist attractions ==
- Longgang museum of Hakka culture

Beaches

Most of the beaches are in Dapeng New District.

- Ju Diao Sha 桔钓沙
- Dong Chong 东冲
- Xi Chong 西冲

== Rivers ==
- Egongling River

== Transportation ==
=== Shenzhen Metro ===
Longgang is currently served by five metro lines operated by Shenzhen Metro:

- Line 3 - Buji 5 14, Mumianwan, Dafen, Danzhutou, Liuyue, Tangkeng, Henggang, Yonghu, He'ao, Universiade 14 16, Ailian, Jixiang, Longcheng Square, Nanlian, Shuanglong 16
- Line 5 - Wuhe 10, Bantian, Yangmei, Shangshuijing, Xiashuijing, Changlong, Buji 3 14, Baigelong
- Line 10 - Yabao, Nankeng, Guangyayuan, Wuhe 5, Bantian North, Bei'er Road, Huawei, Gangtou, Xuexiang, Gankeng, Liangmao Hill, Shanglilang, Mugu, Huanancheng, Hehua, Pinghu, Shuangyong Street
- Line 14 - Buji 3 5, Shiyaling, Liuyue North, Silian, Aobei, Universiade 3 16, Zhangbei, Nanyue, Baolong
- Line 16 - Universiade 3 14, Universiade Center, Longcheng Park, Huanggekeng, Yuyuan, Huilongpu, Shangjing, Shengping, Longyuan, Shuanglong 3, Xintangwei, Longdong, Baolong Tongle
