= Minzhi station =

Metro station in Shenzhen, China

Coordinates: 22°37′6″N 114°2′29″E

Minzhi 民治
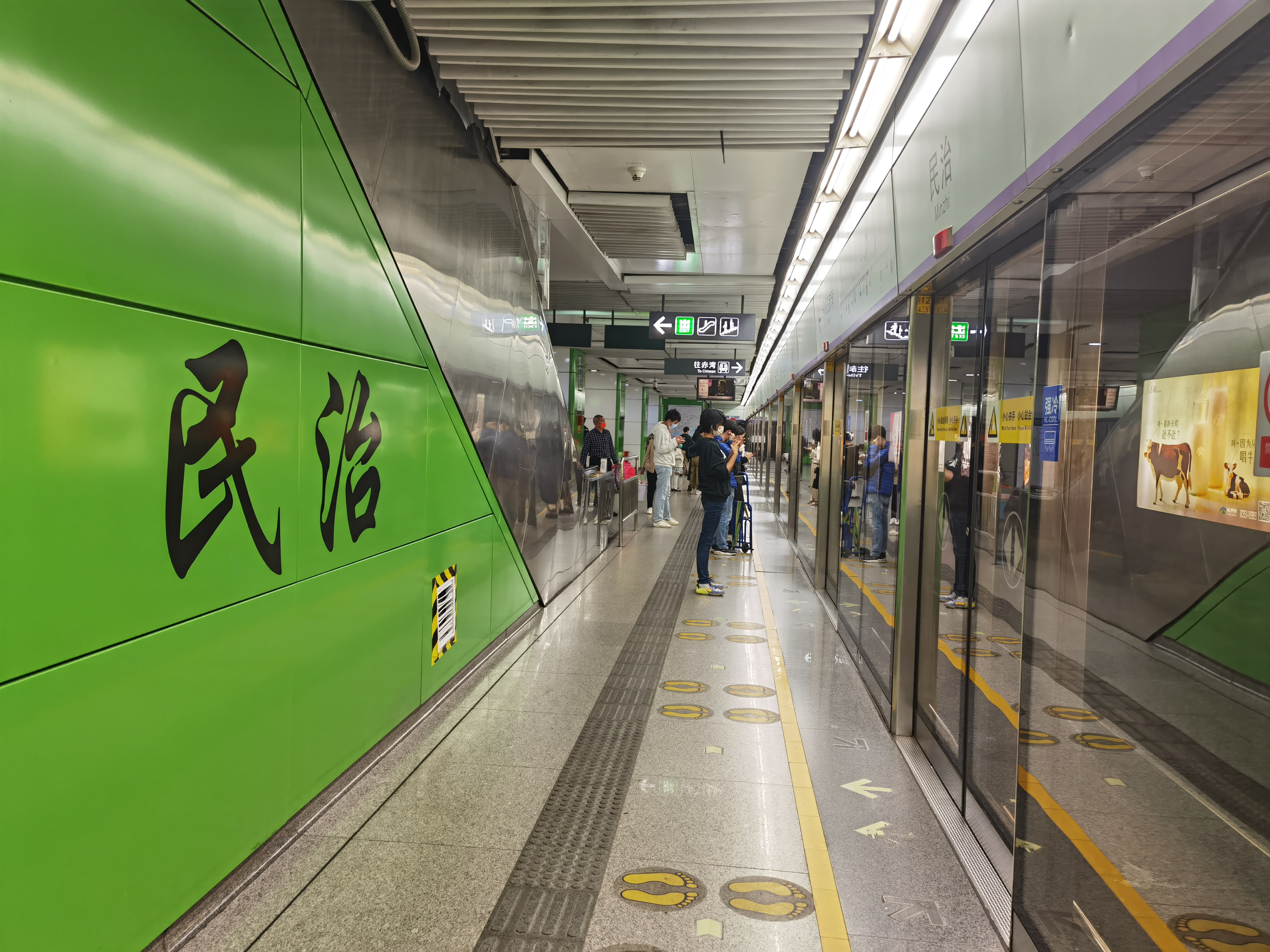

General information
- Location: Longhua District, Shenzhen, Guangdong; China
- Operator: SZMC (Shenzhen Metro Group)
- Line: Line 5

History
- Opened: 22 June 2011

Services
Preceding station	Shenzhen Metro	Following station
Wuhe towards Grand Theater	Line 5	Shenzhen North towards Chiwan
Location

Minzhi station (Chinese: 民治站; pinyin: Mínzhì Zhàn; Jyutping: man^{4} zi^{6} zaam^{6}) is a station on Line 5 of the Shenzhen Metro. It opened on 22 June 2011.

== Station layout ==
G	-	Exit
B1F; Concourse	Lobby	Customer Service, Shops, Vending machines, ATMs
B2F; Platforms	Platform 1	← 5 towards Chiwan (Shenzhen North)
B2F; Platforms	Island platform, doors will open on the left
B2F; Platforms	Platform 2	→ 5 towards Grand Theater (Wuhe) →

== Exits ==
Exit	Destination
Exit A	Minzhi Boulevard (W), Minde Road (S), Zhangkeng Residential Area 1, Minkang Road, Minzhi Local Taxation Office, Local Taxation Bureau of Ban'an District of Shenzhen
Exit B	Minzhi Boulevard (E), Minde Road (N), Minkang Road, Minxin Community Workstation, Minzhi Rainbow Department Store, Bishui Longting, Haoyue Garden
Exit C	Reserved Exit
Exit D	Minzhi Avenue (W), Minde Road (N), Zhangkeng Residential Area 2, Dongbian Business Building, Minzhi Primary School, Shayuanpu Village, Chaoyang Xincun, Wanzhong Town

== Gallery ==
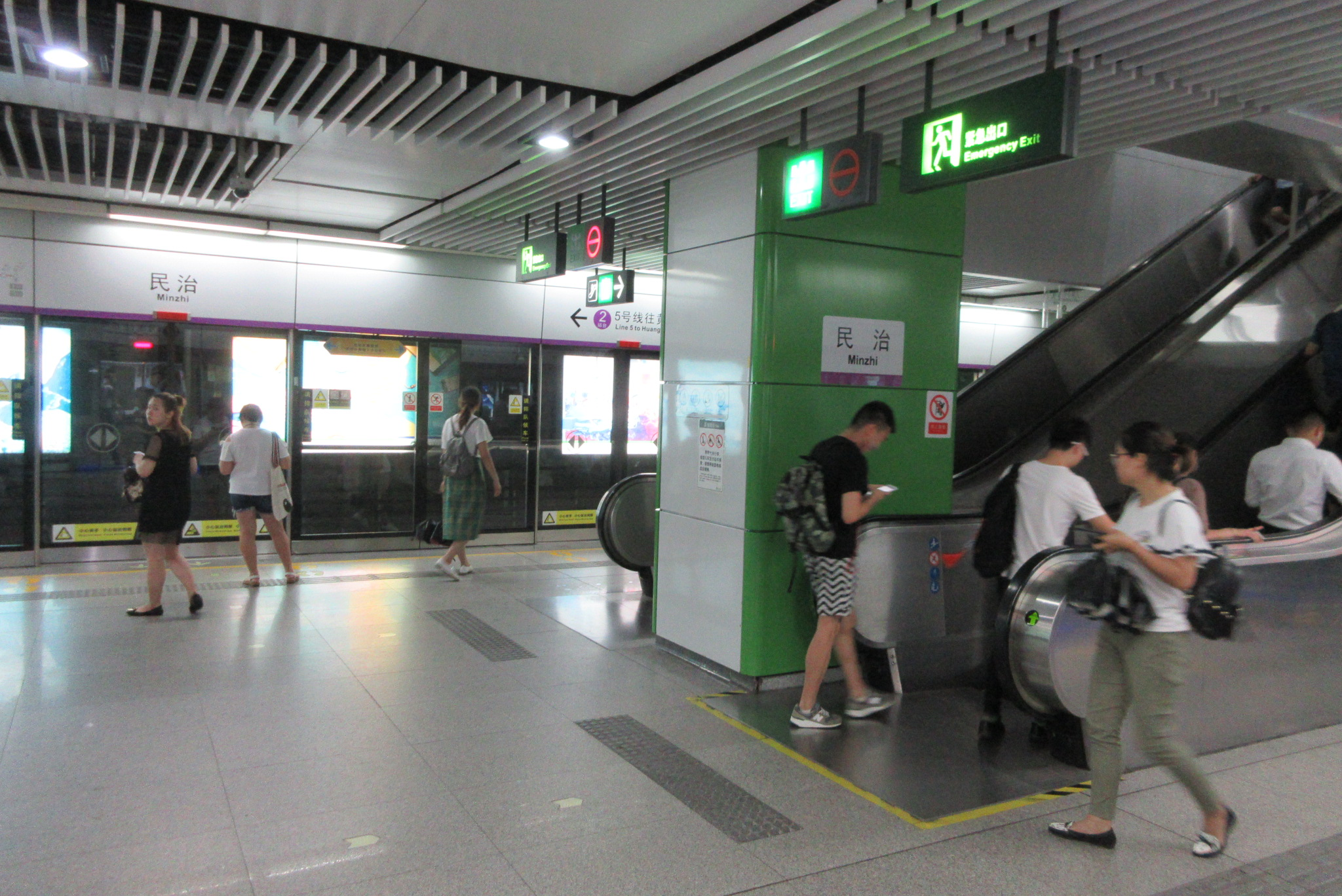
Platform (2017)

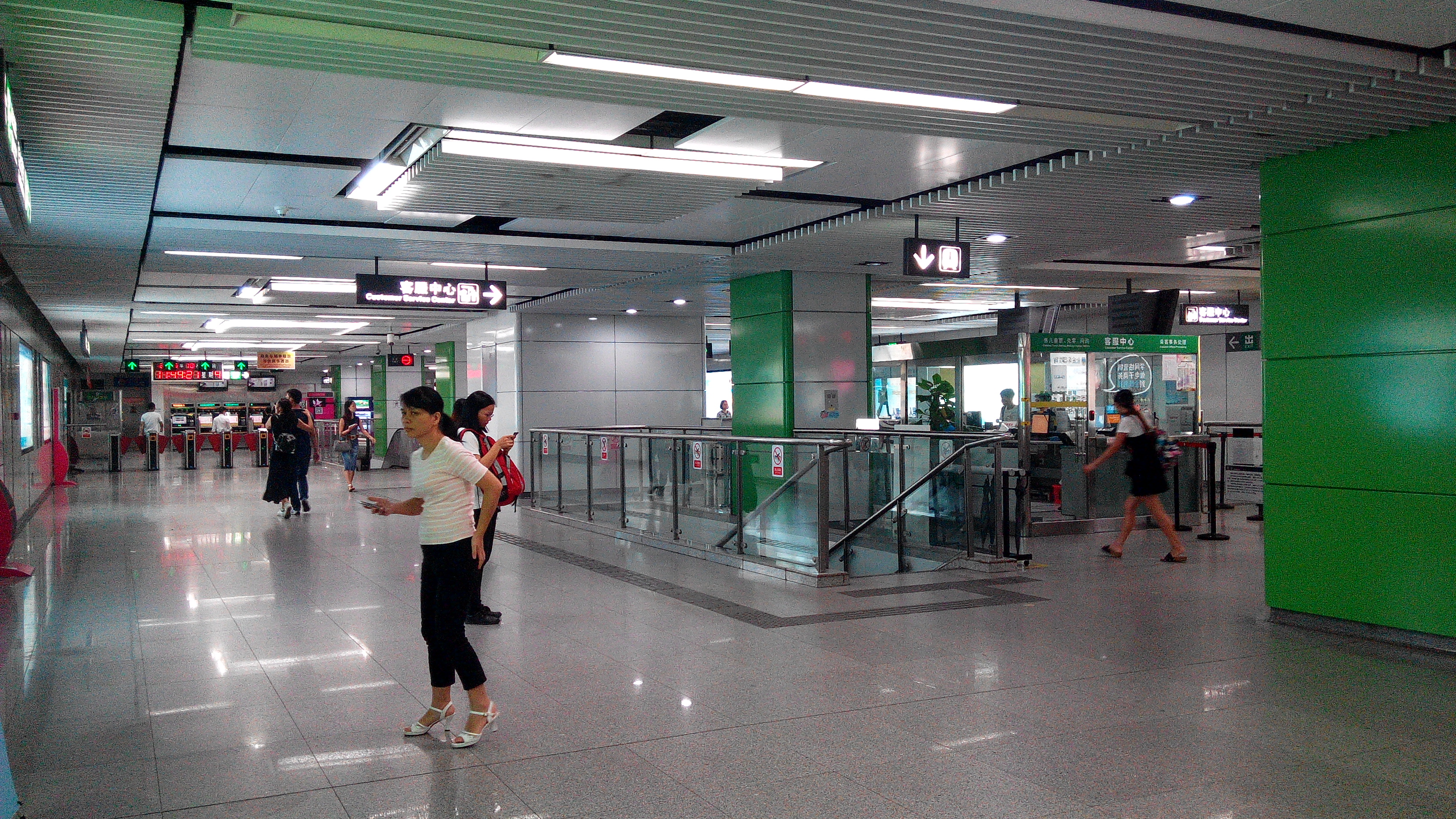
Concourse (2016)
