= Pinghu station =

Metro station in Shenzhen, China

Pinghu 平湖
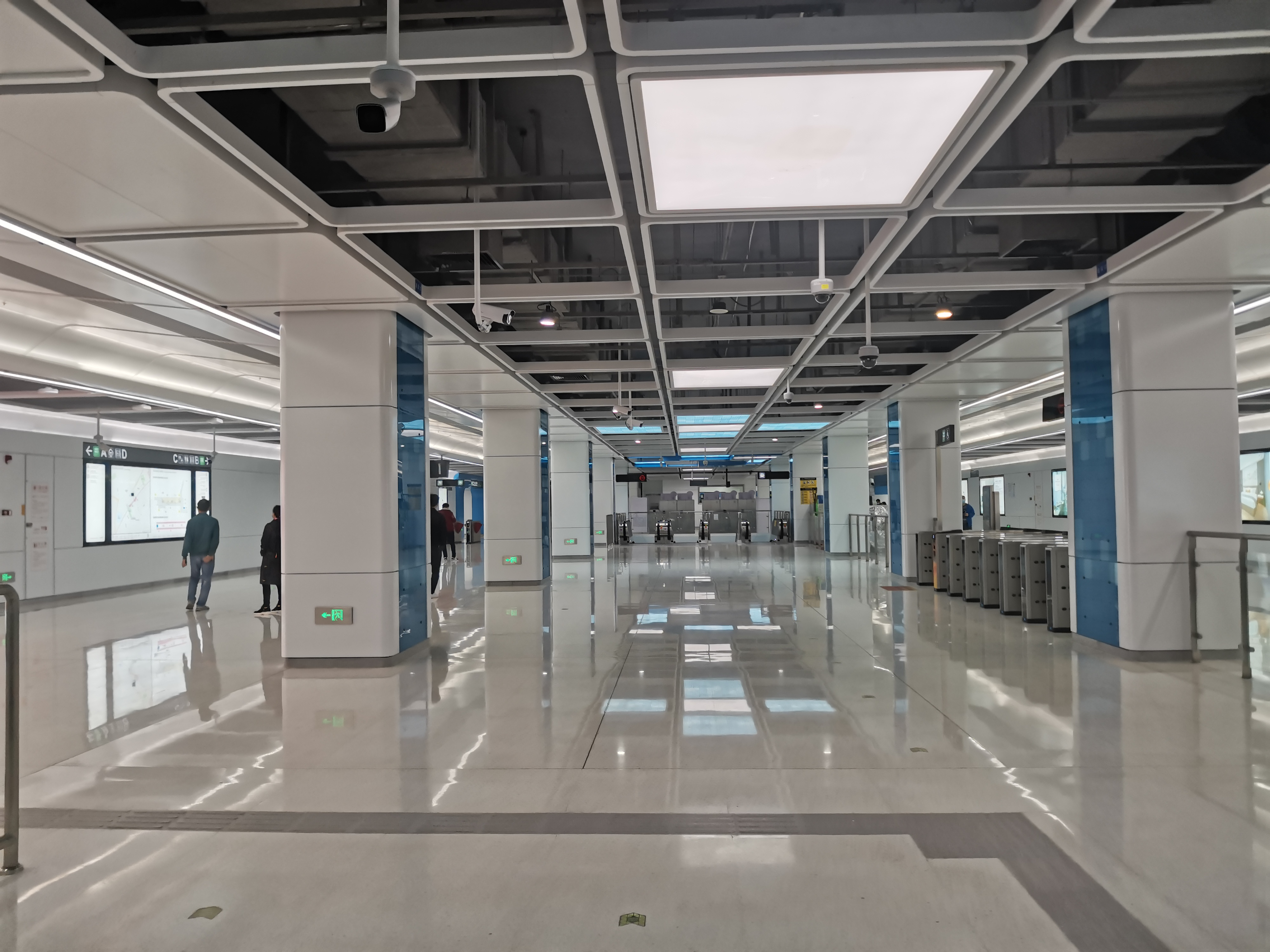
- Concourse

General information
- Location: Longgang District, Shenzhen, Guangdong; China
- Coordinates: 22.696449°N 114.120863°E
- Operated by: SZMC (Shenzhen Metro Group)
- Line: Line 10
- Platforms: 2 (1 island platform)
- Tracks: 2

Construction
- Structure type: Underground
- Accessible: Yes

History
- Opened: 18 August 2020

Services
Preceding station	Shenzhen Metro	Following station
Shuangyong Street Terminus	Line 10	Hehua towards Futian Checkpoint
Location

Pinghu station (Chinese: 平湖站; pinyin: Pínghú Zhàn) is a station on Line 10 of the Shenzhen Metro. It opened on August 18, 2020.

== Station layout ==
G	-	Exit
B1F; Concourse	Lobby	Customer Service, Shops, Vending machines, ATMs
B2F; Platforms	Platform	← Line 10 towards Futian Checkpoint (Hehua)
B2F; Platforms	Island platform, doors will open on the left
B2F; Platforms	Platform	→ Line 10 towards Shuangyong Street (Terminus) →

== Exits ==
Exit	Destination
Exit A	Pinghu Railway Station, East Side of Shangda Street
Exit B	West Side of Changping Street, North Side of Ping'an Blvd
Exit C	West Side of Pinghu Street
Exit D	Pinghu Railway Station, East Side of Shangda Street

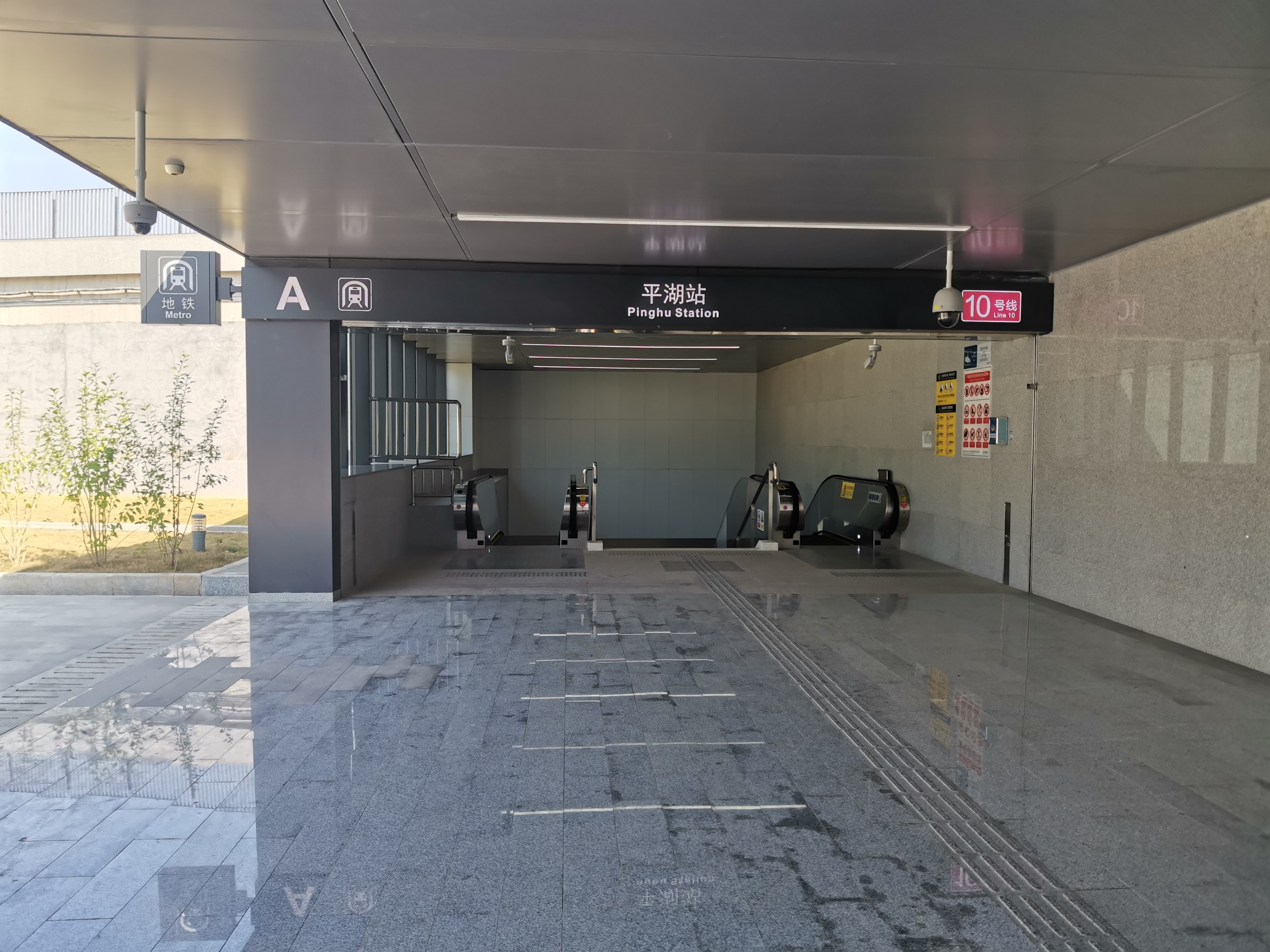
Exit A

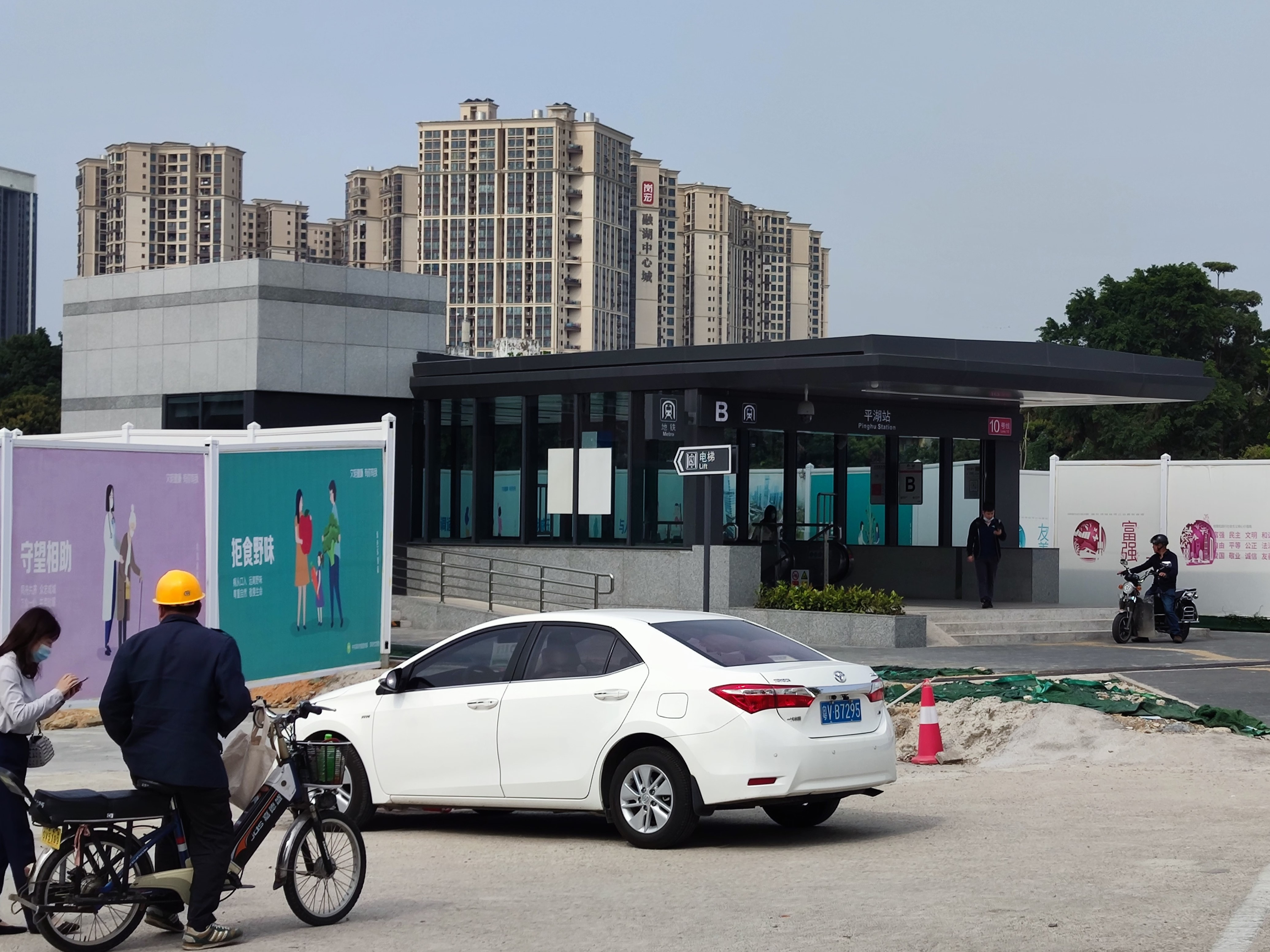
Exit B

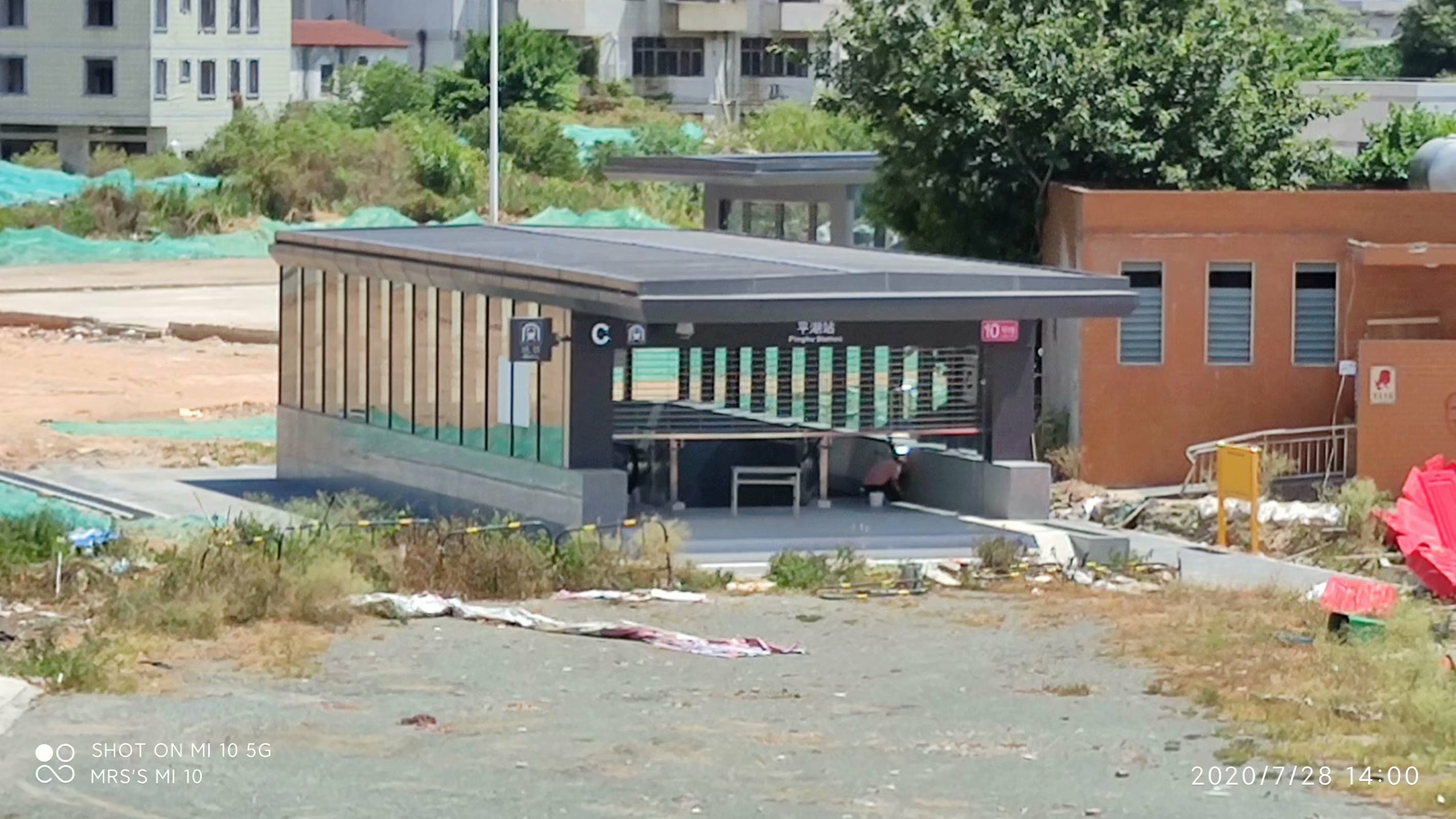
Exit C

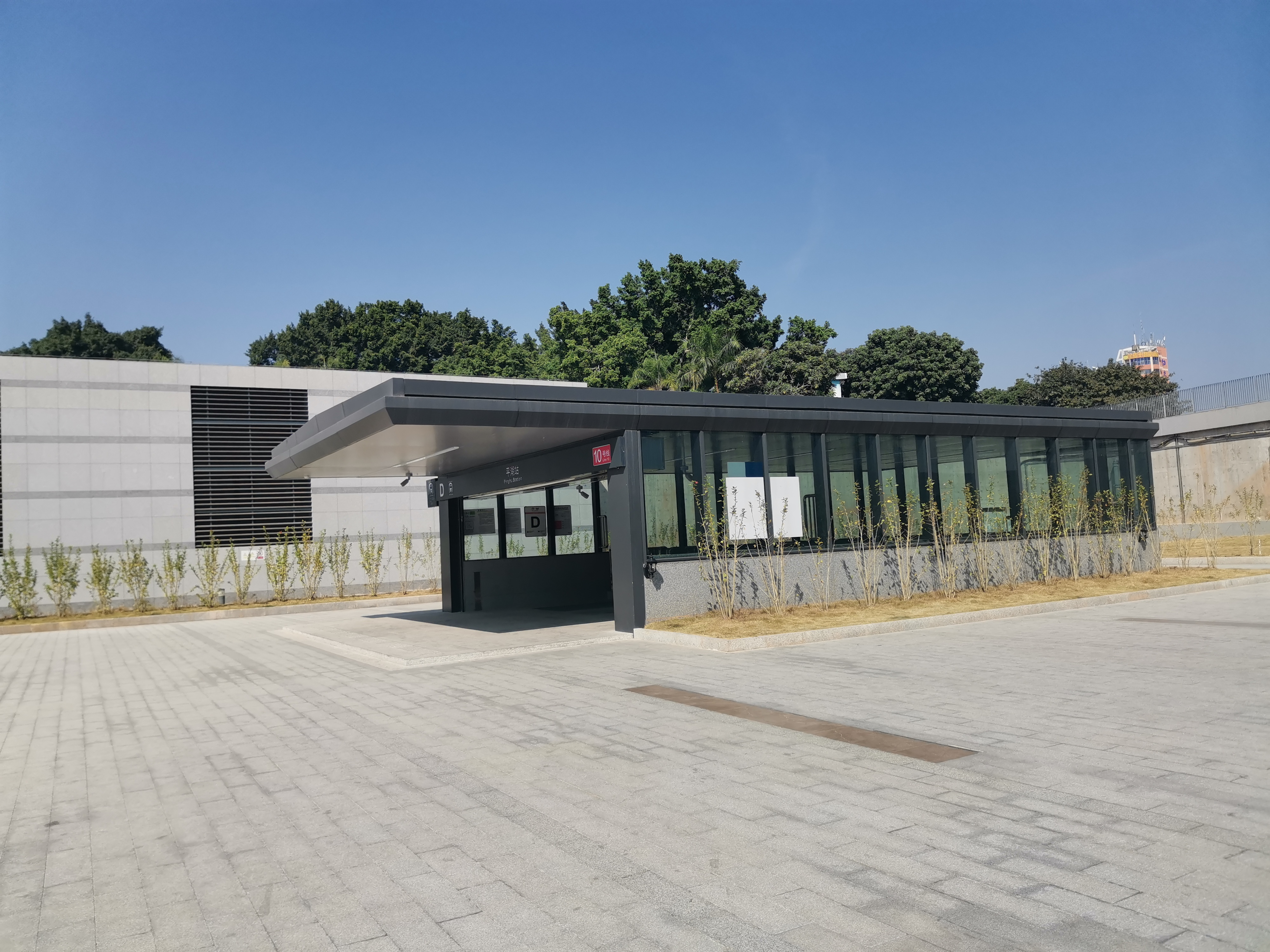
Exit D
