= Line 10 (Shenzhen Metro) =

Metro line in Shenzhen, China

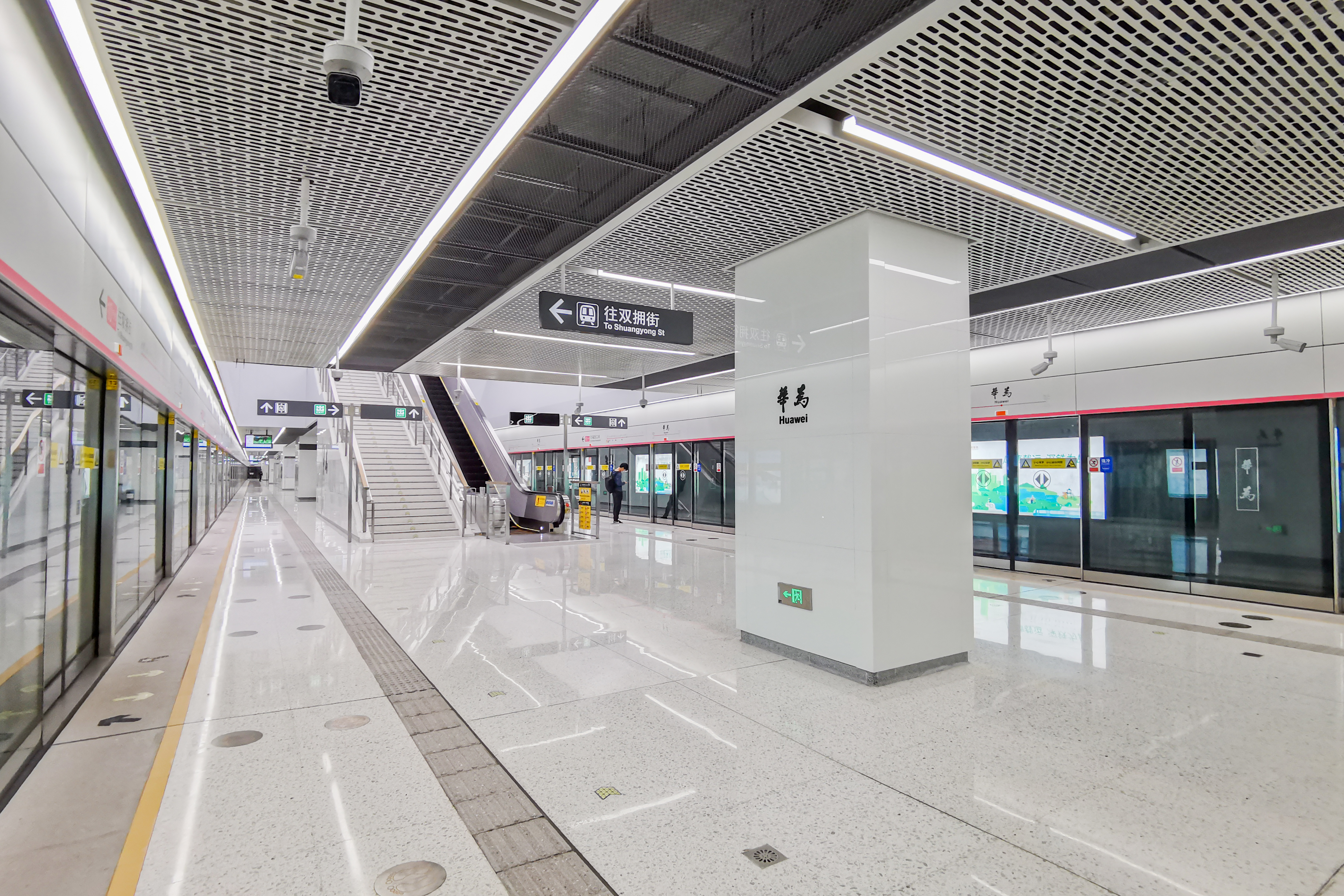
- Huawei station

Overview
- Status: In operation
- Locale: Shenzhen, China
- Termini: Futian Checkpoint; Shuangyong Street
- Stations: 24
- Color on map: Pink (#F8779E)

Service
- Type: Rapid transit
- System: Shenzhen Metro
- Operator: SZMC (Shenzhen Metro Group)
- Depot(s): Liangmao Hill Depot; Yitian stabling yard
- Rolling stock: CRRC Changchun (1001-1035) (Type A, 8 cars)

History
- Opened: 18 August 2020; 5 years ago

Technical
- Line length: 29.3 km (18.2 mi)
- Number of tracks: Double-track
- Character: Underground
- Track gauge: 1,435 mm (4 ft 8 1/2 in) standard gauge
- Electrification: 1,500 V DC (overhead lines)
- Operating speed: 80 km/h (50 mph)
- Signalling: CBTC

Line 10 (simplified Chinese: 十号线; traditional Chinese: 十號線; Jyutping: sap^{6} hou^{6} sin^{3}; pinyin: Shíhào Xiàn), also known as the Pinghu line or Bantian line (坂田线; 坂田線; baan^{2} tin^{4} sin^{3}; Bǎntián Xiàn) of the Shenzhen Metro began construction at the end of 2015. The line opened on 18 August 2020. Line 10 has a length of 29.3 km (18.2 mi) and a total of 24 stations. It connects the Futian Checkpoint to Shuangyong Street. In the southern terminus of the line, a 555-meter-long and 50.5-meter-wide double deck underground depot capable of storing 16 trains will be constructed.

== History ==
Line 10 was originally a low priority line to be constructed in the long-term future called Line 16. In 2011, the Shenzhen Municipal Government approved the Longgang District Government to start the preliminary work on Line 10. On 2013, the Shenzhen Municipal Government renumbered Line 16 into Line 10 and included it in the Phase III expansion. The original Shenzhen Metro Line 10 was renumbered to Line 12 planned to be built in Phase IV. This was done to fast track the construction of the line to ease the pressure on Line 4 and accommodate further growth of the Longgang area. According to the original plan, the northern section of Line 10 runs through Fenggang town of the neighboring Dongguan City. Due to legal and government coordination problems, Line 10 will temporarily terminate in Pinghu, with capability to extend further north into Dongguan in the future. Further into construction, the line was redesigned to handle 8 car trains instead of the original specification of 6 cars to increase the line's ability to handle the growing transport demand in Shenzhen.

== Opening timeline ==
Segment	Commencement	Length	Station(s)	Name
Futian Checkpoint — Shuangyong Street	18 August 2020	29.3 km (18.21 mi)	23	Phase 1
Gangxia North	28 October 2022	Infill station	1	Phase 1

== Service routes ==
- Futian Checkpoint — Shuangyong Street (Before 11:00 PM)
- Futian Checkpoint — Xuexiang (Working days peak hours only)
- Futian Checkpoint → Gankeng (One way, from 11:00 PM to 11:30 PM)

== Stations ==
Service routes		Station name		Connections	Nearby bus stops	Distance km	Location
Service routes		English	Chinese	Connections	Nearby bus stops	Distance km	Location
Line 10 Northern Extension (Under planning)
		Huanggekeng	黄阁坑	16			Longgang
		Dynamic Town	大远城邦				Fenggang, Dongguan
		Guanjingtou	官井头				Fenggang, Dongguan
		Youganpu	油甘埔				Fenggang, Dongguan
		Longping Road	龙平路				Fenggang, Dongguan
Line 10 (In operation)
●		Shuangyong Street	双拥街		M181 M290 M318 M412 M498 M573-clockwise（M573内环） M573-anticlockwise（M573外环）Dongguan Peak-time-express 2（东莞高峰快2） Dongguan 915（莞915）		Longgang
●		Pinghu	平湖	PHQ	882 977 979 E10 M172 M181 M198 M228 M264 M265 M269 M270 M283 M302 M311 M318 M370 M407 M498 M573-anticlockwise（M573外环）		Longgang
●		Hehua	禾花		B878 M154 M198 M300 M359 M412		Longgang
●		Huanancheng	华南城		M181 M269 M300 M311 M412 M573-anticlockwise（M573外环）		Longgang
●		Mugu	木古		322 882 977 979 E10 M181 M269 M300 M311 M412 M573-anticlockwise（M573外环）		Longgang
●		Shanglilang	上李朗	17	322 882 977 M269 M311 M508		Longgang
●		Liangmao Hill	凉帽山		977 980 M224 M227 M269 M273 M324 M346 M363 M491 M547 M565		Longgang
●	↑	Gankeng	甘坑		980 M268 M273 M346 M403 M414		Longgang
●	↑	Xuexiang	雪象		334 339 M543 Peak-time 34（高峰34）		Longgang
●	↑	Gangtou	岗头		334 624 E8 E27 M198 M267 M272 M298 M309 M346 M383 M461A M491 M538 M543 M545 M572 Peak-express 81（高快81） Peak-time 34（高峰34） Peak-time 221（高峰221）		Longgang
●	↑	Huawei	华为		339 M198 Peak-time 34（高峰34） Peak-time 221（高峰221）		Longgang
●	↑	Bei'er Road	贝尔路	25	321 328 334 339 E8 M137 M198 M281 M282A M383 M547 M567 M568 M578 Peak-time 33（高峰33） Peak-time 34（高峰34） Peak-time 221（高峰221）		Longgang
●	↑	Bantian North	坂田北		312 328 334 339 982 M137 M180 M233 M244 M269 M281 M282A M298 M310 M379 M383 M408 M421 M453 M505 M578 Peak-time 33（高峰33） Peak-time 34（高峰34） Peak-time 91（高峰91）		Longgang
●	↑	Wuhe	五和	5	328 612 982 B686 E22 M137 M263 M271 M282A M282B M342 M346 M383 M385 M398 M415 M448 M461A M461B M491 M521 M533 M566 M567 Peak-express 41（高快41） Peak-time 91（高峰91）		Longgang
●	↑	Guangyayuan	光雅园		328 612 621 982 E22 M137 M263 M271 M281 M282A M300 M342 M346 M363 M383 M385 M448 M491 M521 M566 M572 Peak-time 21（高峰21） Peak-time 22（高峰22） Peak-time 33（高峰33） Peak-time 91（高峰91） Peak-time 123（高峰123）		Longgang
●	↑	Nankeng	南坑		328 612 621 982 M263 M271 M281 M282A M300 M346 M347 M383 M385 M491 M566 Peak-time 22（高峰22） Peak-time 33（高峰33） Peak-time 91（高峰91） Peak-time 123（高峰123）		Longgang
●	↑	Yabao	雅宝		328 612 621 M263 M281 M282A M282B M300 M347 M383 M385 M448 M566 Peak-time 33（高峰33） Peak-time 91（高峰91）		Longgang
●	↑	Maling	孖岭	9	B821		Futian
●	↑	Donggualing	冬瓜岭		34 67 75 320 339 M207 M262 M347 M383 M453 M459 M500 Peak-time 3（高峰3） Peak-time 23（高峰23） Peak-time 33（高峰33） Peak-time 91（高峰91） Peak-time 123（高峰123）		Futian
●	↑	Lianhuacun	莲花村	3	10 14 34 46 64 65 67 75 104 108 111 123 215 237 313 322 333 339 357 371 379 383 398 E28 K105 M204 M221 M223 M262 M347 M372 M374 M383 M389 M454 M459 M488 M500 M521 Peak-express 18（高快18） Peak-time 15（高峰15） Peak-time 21（高峰21） Peak-time 106（高峰106） Peak-time 123（高峰123）		Futian
●	↑	Gangxia North	岗厦北	2 8 11 14	101 113 204 223 303 320 326 M102 M103 M106 M133 M190 M447 M448 Peak-express 47（高快47）Peak-express 60（高快60）Peak-time 3（高峰3）Peak-time 49（高峰49）Peak-time 119（高峰119）Peak-time 221（高峰221）		Futian
●	↑	Gangxia	岗厦	1	3 14 38 62 63 303 339 377 E10 M102 M103 M138 M194 M198 M224 M329 M476 Peak-time 20（高峰20）Peak-time 23（高峰23）Peak-time 27（高峰27）Peak-time 29（高峰29）Peak-time 91（高峰91）		Futian
●	↑	Fumin	福民	4 7	26 34 52 60 62 63 73 303 339 377 M102 M103 M133 M138 M169 M347 M476		Futian
●	↑	Futian Checkpoint	福田口岸	4 (Note: Out-of-station interchange.); East Rail line (Note: System transfer via Lok Ma Chau [through border check])	26 362 B685 B905 B957 M499		Futian
