= Shuangyong Street station =

Metro station in Shenzhen, Guangdong, China

Shuangyong Street 双拥街
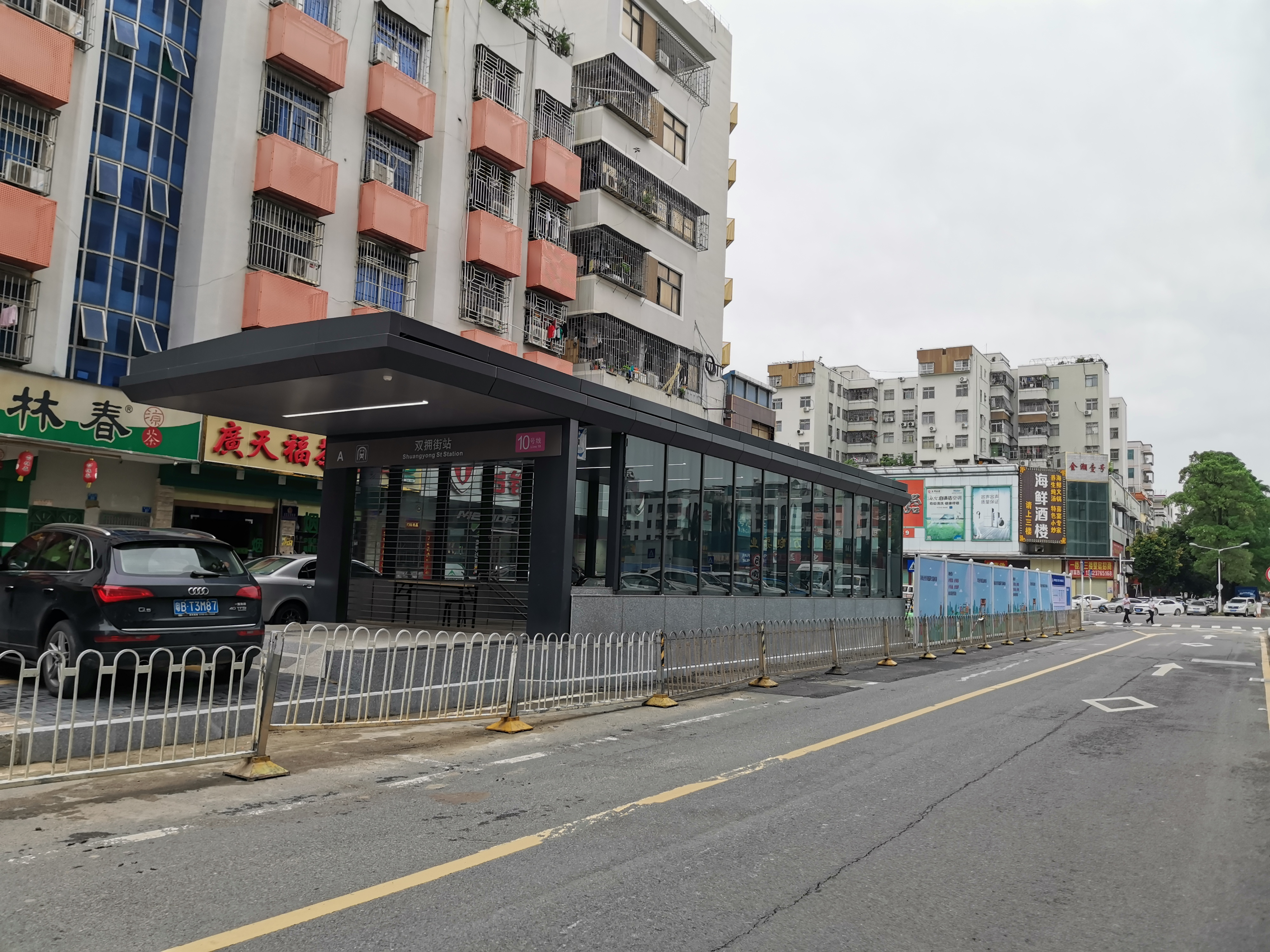

General information
- Location: Longgang District, Shenzhen, Guangdong; China
- Coordinates: 22.701781°N 114.128620°E
- Operated by: SZMC (Shenzhen Metro Group)
- Line: Line 10

History
- Opened: 18 August 2020

Services
| Preceding station | Shenzhen Metro | Following station |
|---|---|---|
| Terminus | Line 10 | Pinghu towards Futian Checkpoint |
Location

Shuangyong Street station (Chinese: 双拥街站; pinyin: Shuāngyōngjiē Zhàn) is the northern terminus station of Line 10 of the Shenzhen Metro. It opened on August 18, 2020.

== Station layout ==
| G | - | Exit |
| B1F; Concourse | Lobby | Customer Service, Shops, Vending machines, ATMs |
| B2F; Platforms | Platform | ← Line 10 towards Futian Checkpoint (Pinghu) |
| B2F; Platforms | Island platform, doors will open on the left |
| B2F; Platforms | Platform | → Line 10 termination platform → |

== Exits ==
| Exit | | Destination |
|---|---|---|
| Exit A | | South Side of Shuangyong Street |
| Exit B | B1 | North Side of Shuangyong Street, China Post (Pinghu Branch) |
| Exit B | B2 | North Side of Shuangyong Street, China Post (Pinghu Branch) |
| Exit C | | North Side of Shuangyong Street, Shenzhen Longgang District Fifth People's Hospital |
