= Line 17 =

Line 17 may refer to:

== China ==
- Line 17 (Beijing Subway)
- Line 17 (Guangzhou Metro) (planned)
- Line 17 (Chengdu Metro)
- Line 17 (Shanghai Metro)
- Line 17 (Shenzhen Metro) (planned)
- Line 17 (Zhengzhou Metro) (under construction)

== Other countries ==
- Line 17 (São Paulo Metro), a monorail line in São Paulo, Brazil.
- Line 17, part of the Green Line (Stockholm Metro), in Sweden
- Line 17 (Zürich), or Bremgarten–Dietikon railway line, in Switzerland
- Paris Metro Line 17, in France (under construction)
- Sinsen Line, Line 17 of the Oslo Tramway, in Norway

== See also ==
- List of public transport routes numbered 17
