= Line 17 (Shenzhen Metro) =

Planned metro line in Shenzhen, China

- 17

Overview
- Status: Under construction
- Locale: Shenzhen, Guangdong
- Termini: Qiaoshe; Shanglilang (Phase 1)
- Stations: 18 (Phase 1)

Service
- Type: Rapid transit
- System: Shenzhen Metro
- Services: 1
- Operator: SZMC (Shenzhen Metro Group)

History
- Planned opening: 2028; 2 years' time

Technical
- Line length: 18.8 km (Phase 1)
- Character: Underground

Line 17 (simplified Chinese: 十七号线; traditional Chinese: 十七號線; pinyin: Shíqī Hàoxiàn; Jyutping: Sap6 Cat1 Hou6 Sin3) of the Shenzhen Metro is a Phase V expansion metro line under construction in the eastern Shenzhen districts of Luohu and Longgang. Construction on Phase 1 started on 10 October 2023, and the line is expected to open in 2028, which will run from Luohu West in Luohu District to Shanglilang in Longgang District, with 18 stations and 18.8 kilometers of track.

== Stations (Phase 1) ==
Station name		Connections	Location
English	Chinese	Connections	Location
Qiaoshe	侨社	1 (via Luohu)	Luohu
Jiabin	嘉宾		Luohu
Laojie	老街	1 3; 5 (via Dongmen)	Luohu
Datanglong	大塘龙		Luohu
Sungang	笋岗	7	Luohu
Sungang North	笋岗北		Luohu
Luohu North	罗湖北	14; Luohu North (U/C)	Luohu
Dexing	德兴		Luohu
Luogang	罗岗		Longgang
Baigelong	百鸽笼	5	Longgang
Qiushuishan	求水山		Longgang
Nanling	南岭		Longgang
Nanling North	南岭北		Longgang
Danzhutou	丹竹头	3	Longgang
Shiyaling	石芽岭	14	Longgang
Xialilang	下李朗		Longgang
Shenlang	深朗		Longgang
Shanglilang	上李朗	10	Longgang
