= Route 17 =

Route 17 may refer to:

- One of several highways - see List of highways numbered 17
- One of several public transport routes - see List of public transport routes numbered 17
