= Mugu station =

Metro station in Shenzhen, China

Coordinates: 22°32′58″N 114°7′22″E

Mugu 木古
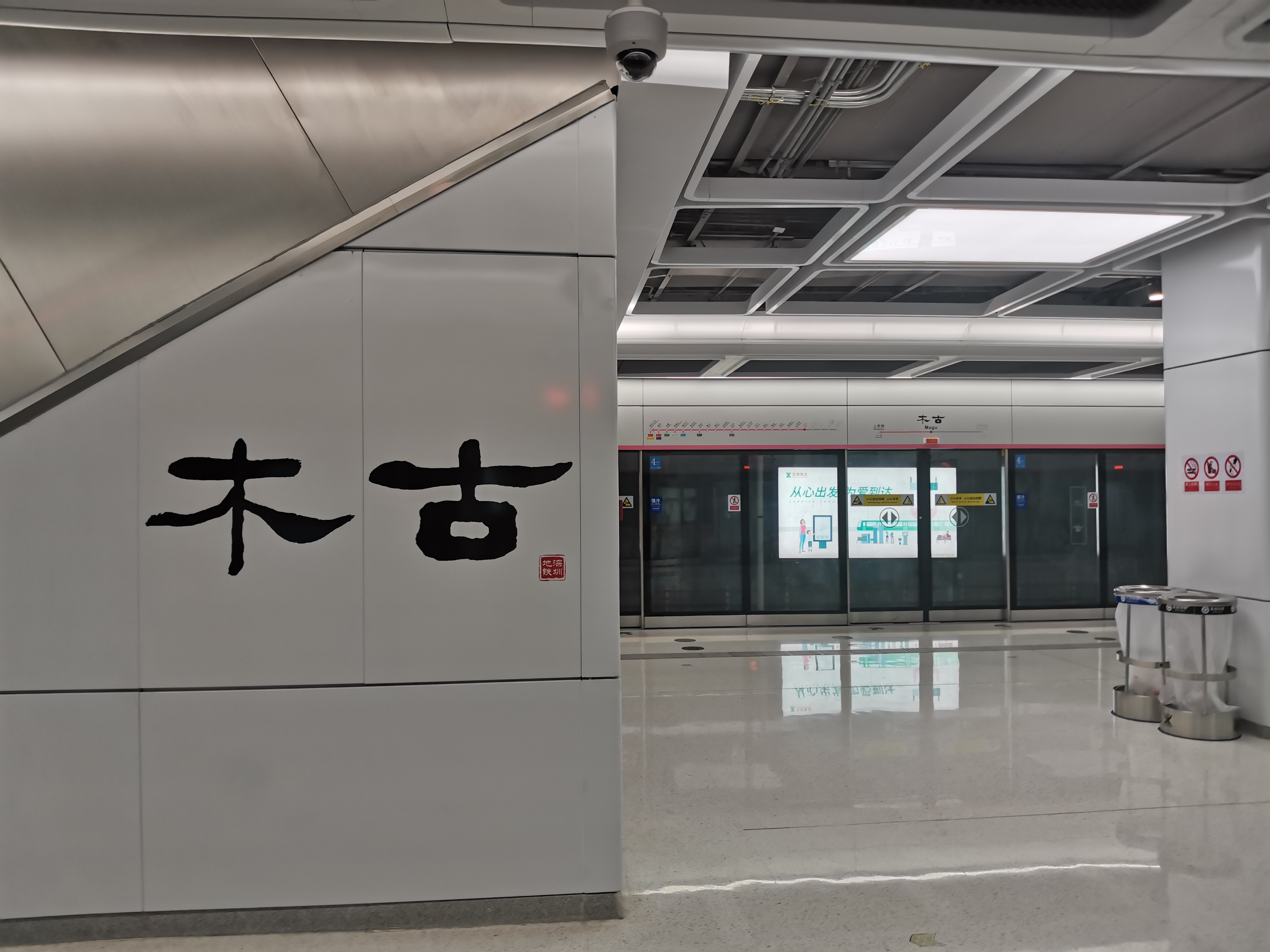

General information
- Location: Longgang District, Shenzhen, Guangdong; China
- Operated by: SZMC (Shenzhen Metro Group)
- Line: Line 10
- Platforms: 2 (1 island platform)
- Tracks: 2

Construction
- Structure type: Underground
- Accessible: Yes

History
- Opened: 18 August 2020

Services
| Preceding station | Shenzhen Metro | Following station |
|---|---|---|
| Huanancheng towards Shuangyong Street | Line 10 | Shanglilang towards Futian Checkpoint |
Location

Mugu station (Chinese: 木古站; pinyin: Mùgǔ Zhàn) is a station on Line 10 of the Shenzhen Metro. It opened on August 18, 2020.

== Station layout ==
| G | - | Exit |
| B1F; Concourse | Lobby | Customer Service, Shops, Vending machines, ATMs |
| B2F; Platforms | Platform | ← Line 10 towards Futian Checkpoint (Shanglilang) |
| B2F; Platforms | Island platform, doors will open on the left |
| B2F; Platforms | Platform | → Line 10 towards Shuangyong Street (Huanancheng) → |

== Exits ==
| Exit | Destination |
|---|---|
| Exit A | South Side of Pingji Boulevard (E), Guangyuan Building, New Mugu Village, Huabanli, Xinyue Square, Xinmu Primary School |
| Exit B | North Side of Pingji Boulevard (E), Hualijia Electronics Market |
| Exit C | North Side of Pingji Boulevard (W), Shenzhen Da'er Xun Science Park, Pinghu Street Fire Squadron, Shangmugu Village |
| Exit D | South Side of Pingji Boulevard (W), Pingji Shangyuan, Shangmugu Village |
