= Buxin station =

Metro station in Shenzhen, China

Coordinates: 22°34′51″N 114°8′17″E

Buxin 布心
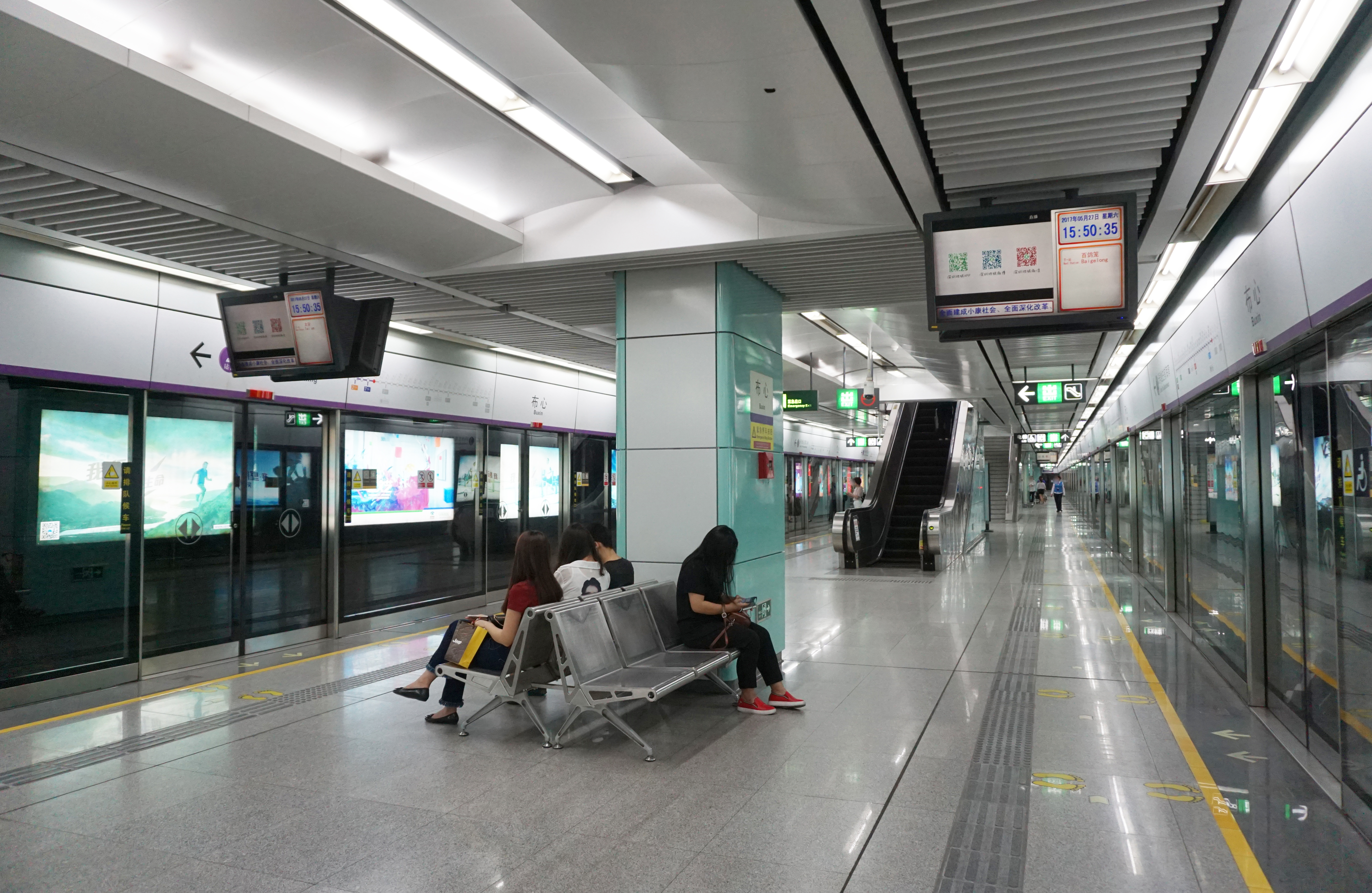

General information
- Location: Dongxiao Road, Donghu Subdistrict, Luohu District, Shenzhen, Guangdong; China
- Operated by: SZMC (Shenzhen Metro Group)
- Line: Line 5

History
- Opened: 22 June 2011

Services
Preceding station	Shenzhen Metro	Following station
Tai'an towards Grand Theater	Line 5	Baigelong towards Chiwan
Location

Buxin station (Chinese: 布心站; pinyin: Bùxīn Zhàn; Jyutping: bou^{3} sam^{1} zaam^{6}) is a station on Line 5 of the Shenzhen Metro. It opened on 22 June 2011. It is located under the intersection of Dongxiao Road and Donghu Road.

The only line that goes to Buxin station is Line 5.

== Station layout ==
G	-	Exit
B1F; Concourse	Lobby	Customer Service, Shops, Vending machines, ATMs
B2F; Platforms	Platform	← 5 towards Chiwan (Baigelong)
B2F; Platforms	Island platform, doors will open on the left
B2F; Platforms	Platform	→ 5 towards Grand Theater (Tai'an) →

== Exits ==
Exit	Destination
Exit A	Donghu Road (N), Jinri Garden, Yangguang Mingjü, Buxin Villa, Taihe Garden, Yizhi Chunxiaoyuan, Jindaotian Road Crossing, Lixiang Xincheng, Dongxiao Department of Cuiyuan Middle School
Exit B	Dongxiao Road (W), Renxin Road, Yixin Road, Dongxiao Primary School, Buxin Market, Luohu District Maternity & Child Healthcare Hospital, Buxincun, Taibaijü (West Gate), Zungfu Tellus Mercedes-Benz 4S Center, Haiying Building, Donghu Police Station, Taojinshan Garden
Exit C	Reserved Exit
Exit D	Donghu Road (S), Buxin Middle School, Huaxiu Garden, Taibaijü (North Gate), Linteng Garden, Caishijie Homestead, Shanhujü, Jingyi Villa, Donghu Sub-district Office, Xinyi Garden
