= Huangmugang station =

Metro station in Shenzhen, China

Huangmugang 黄木岗
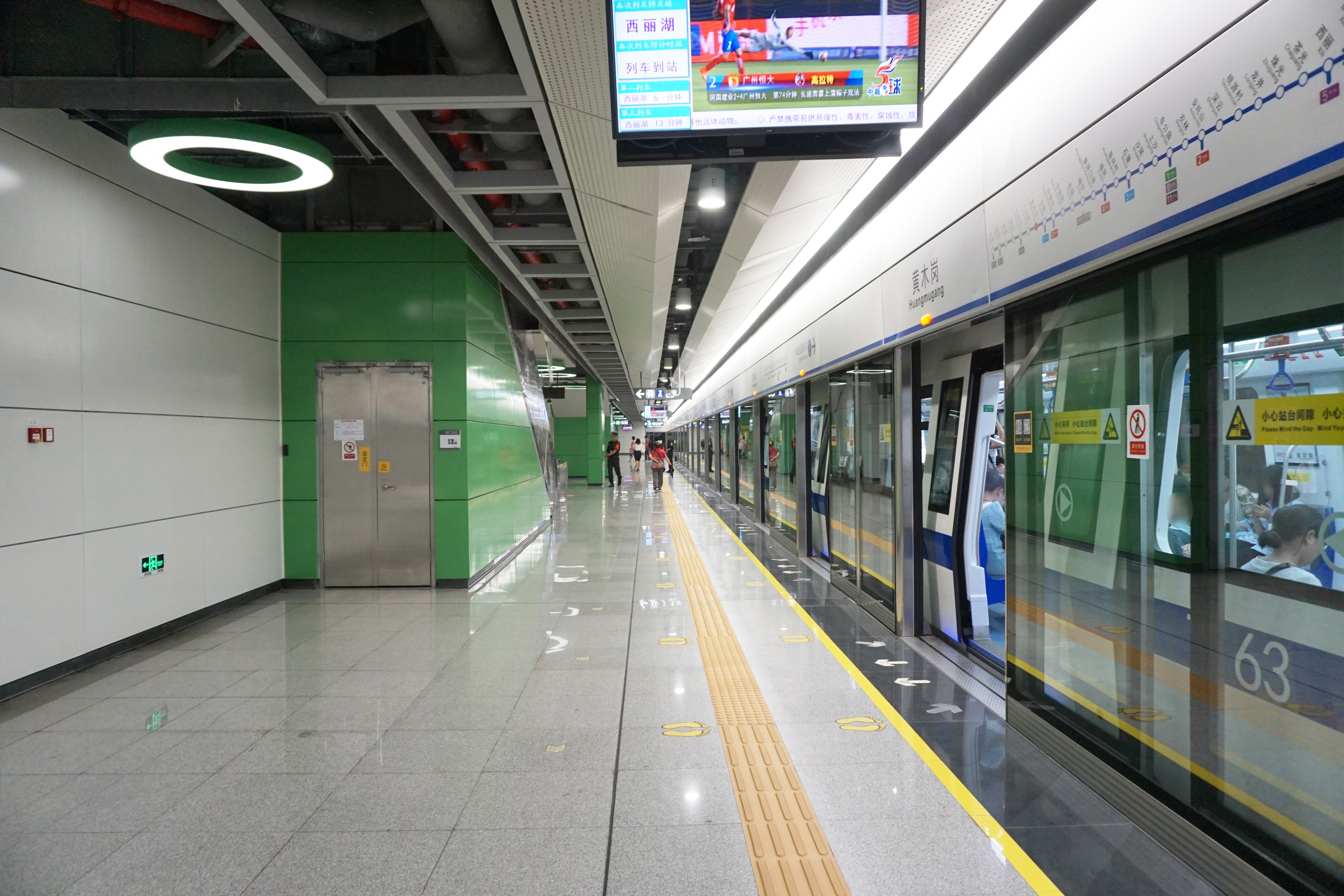
- Line 7 platform before the opening of Line 14

General information
- Location: Futian District, Shenzhen, Guangdong; China
- Coordinates: 22°33′40″N 114°5′35″E
- Operated by: SZMC (Shenzhen Metro Group)
- Lines: Line 7; Line 14
- Platforms: 4 (2 island platforms)
- Tracks: 4

Construction
- Structure type: Underground
- Accessible: Yes

History
- Opened: Line 7: 28 October 2016 (9 years ago); Line 14: 28 October 2022 (3 years ago)

Services
Preceding station	Shenzhen Metro	Following station
Huaxin towards SZU Lihu Campus	Line 7	Bagualing towards Tai'an
Gangxia North Terminus	Line 14	Luohu North towards Shatian
Location

Huangmugang station is an interchange station for Line 7 and Line 14 of the Shenzhen Metro. Line 7 platforms opened on 28 October 2016 and Line 14 platforms opened on 28 October 2022.

It will be a massive transfer station of Line 7, Line 14 and Line 24 in the future. Line 24 platforms was reserved during the construction of Huangmugang Comprehensive Transportation Hub Project, built as part of Line 14.

== Station layout ==
G	-	Exits
B1F; Concourse	Lobby	Ticket Machines, Customer Service, Shops, Vending Machines, Sunken square, Public space of Huangmugang Hub
B2F; Platforms	Platform	14 towards Shatian (Luohu North)
B2F; Platforms	Island platform, doors will open on the left for 7 / right for 14
B2F; Platforms	Platform	7 towards Tai'an (Bagualing)
B3F; Platforms	Platform	14 towards Gangxia North (Terminus)
B3F; Platforms	Island platform, doors will open on the left for 14 / right for 7
B3F; Platforms	Platform	7 towards SZU Lihu Campus (Huaxin)

=== Entrances/exits ===
The station has 21 points of entry/exit, of which 20 are currently open. Prior to the opening of Line 14, the entrances/exits were lettered from A to D. The original exits were re-assigned to Exits 3, 10, 12A and 2 respectively.

Note: Exit 17 is not open.

Exit number	Gallery	Destination
1L		Municipal Design Building, Yuanling Tax Office
2L		South side of Huafu Road, North side of Huaqiang North Road, Haixin Garden
3L		Shenzhen Experimental School (Middle School), Great Wall Building
4L		Shenzhen Experimental School (Middle School), Great Wall Building
5L		
6L As		
6L Bs		
7L		
8L As		
8L Bs		
9L As Bs		Shenzhen Stadium, Shenzhen Gymnasium, Shenzhen Swimming and Diving Center
10L		Sports Building, Shenzhen Swimming and Diving Center, Shenzhen Securities Regulatory Bureau
11L		Sports Building, Shenzhen Swimming and Diving Center, Shenzhen Securities Regulatory Bureau
12L As		Shenzhen Second People's Hospital, Shenzhen Urban Management Bureau, Greening Management Office, Shenzhen Physical Brigade Training Center, Shenzhen Blood Center, Shenzhen Emergency Center
12L Bs		Shenzhen Second People's Hospital, Shenzhen Urban Management Bureau, Greening Management Office, Shenzhen Physical Brigade Training Center, Shenzhen Blood Center, Shenzhen Emergency Center
13L		Shenzhen Second People's Hospital, Shenzhen Blood Center, Shenzhen Emergency Center
14L		Shenzhen Second People's Hospital, Meigang Road
15L		
16L		
17L	Not open	
Note: Tactile Paving | Elevator Access

== Gallery ==
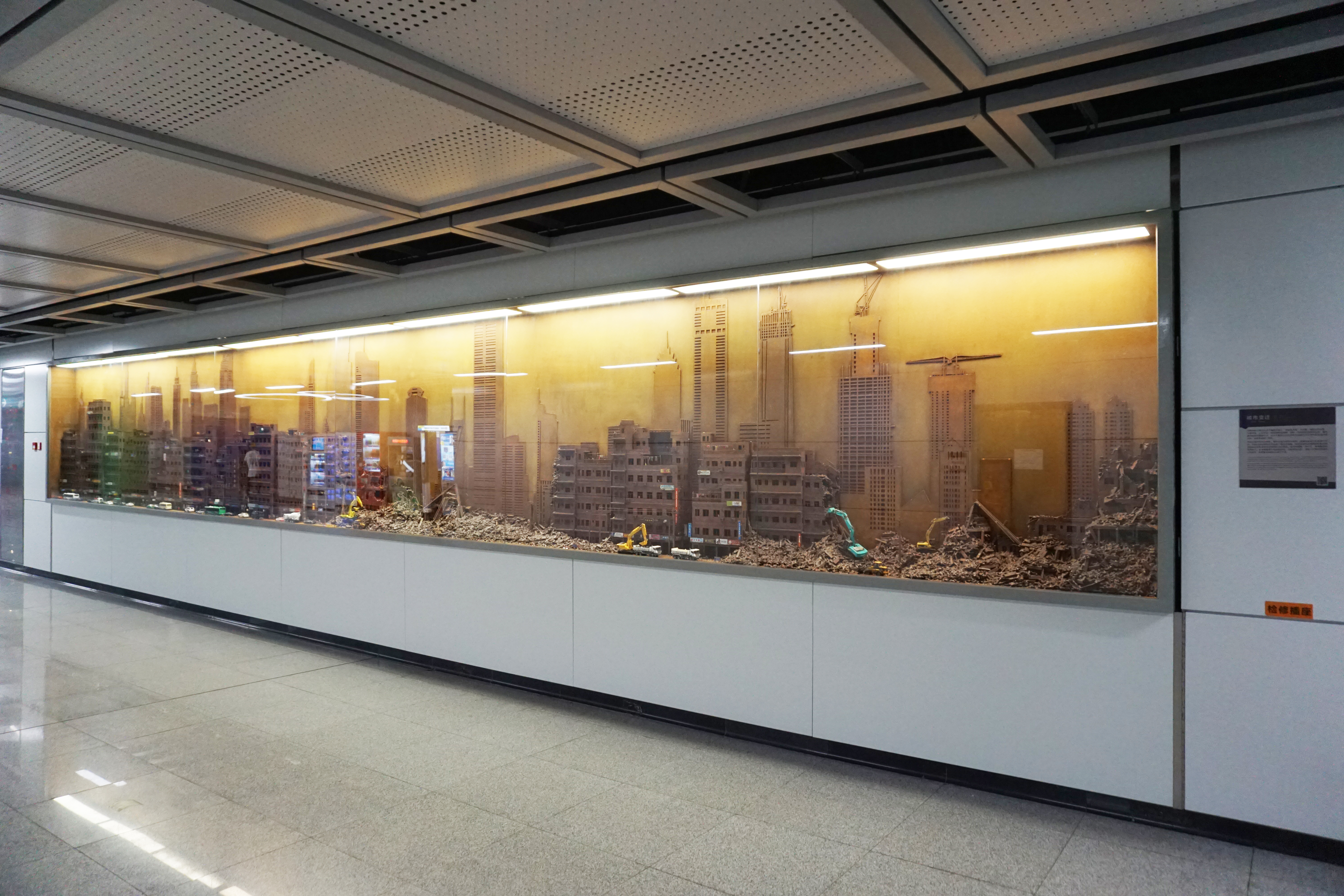
Art Wall - Urban Change (removed)

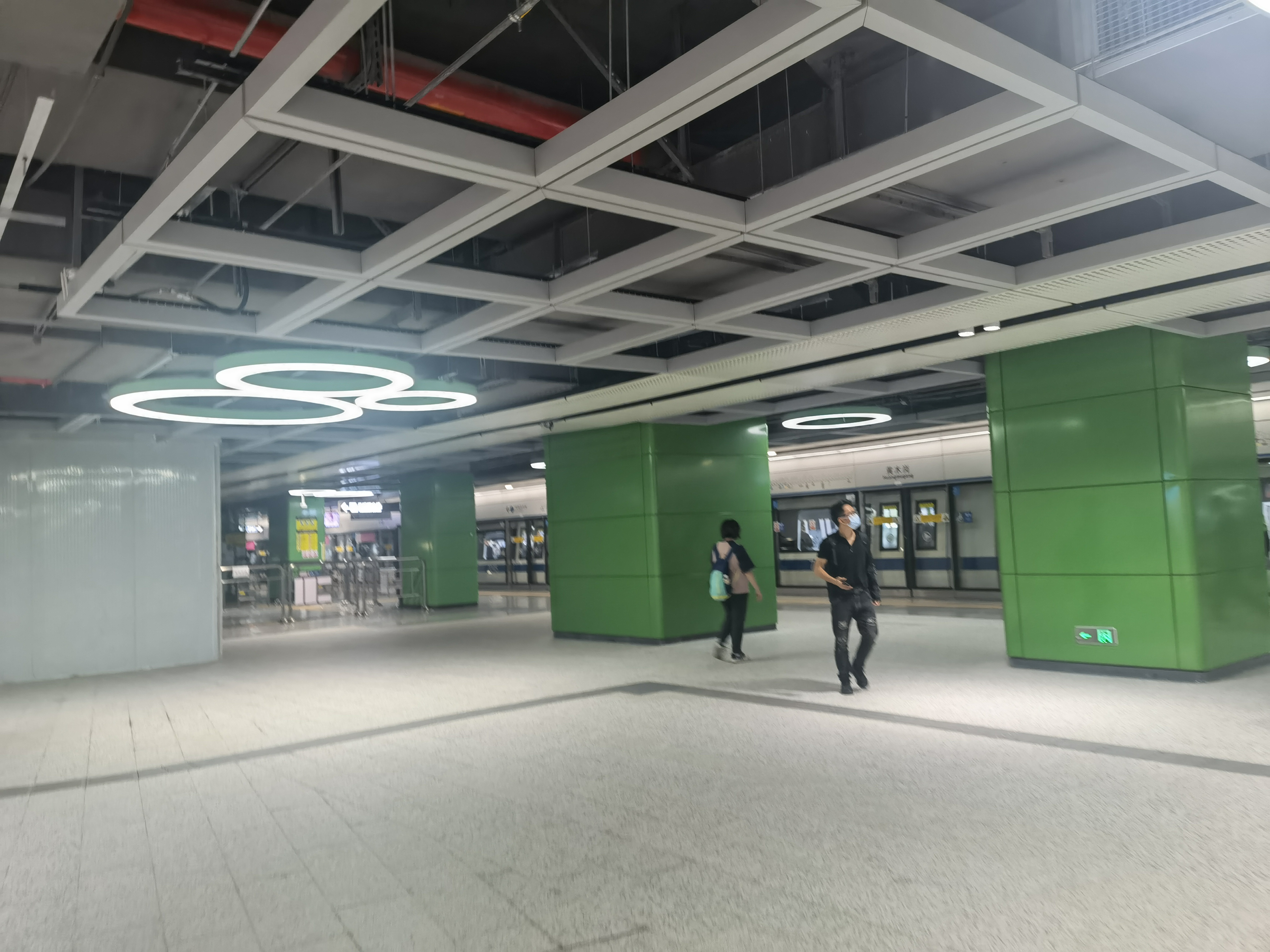
Line 7 platform towards Tai'an

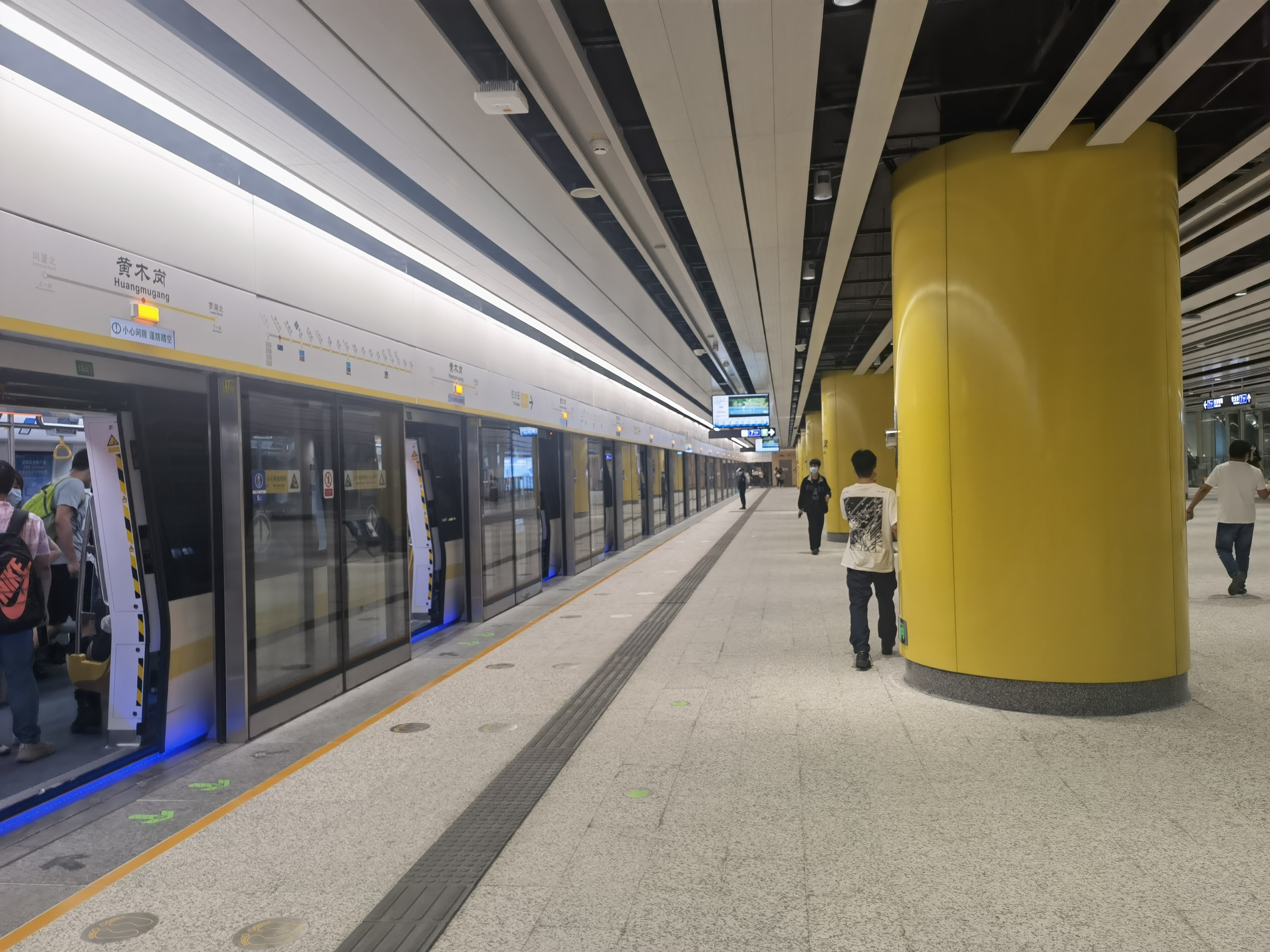
Line 14 platform towards Shatian

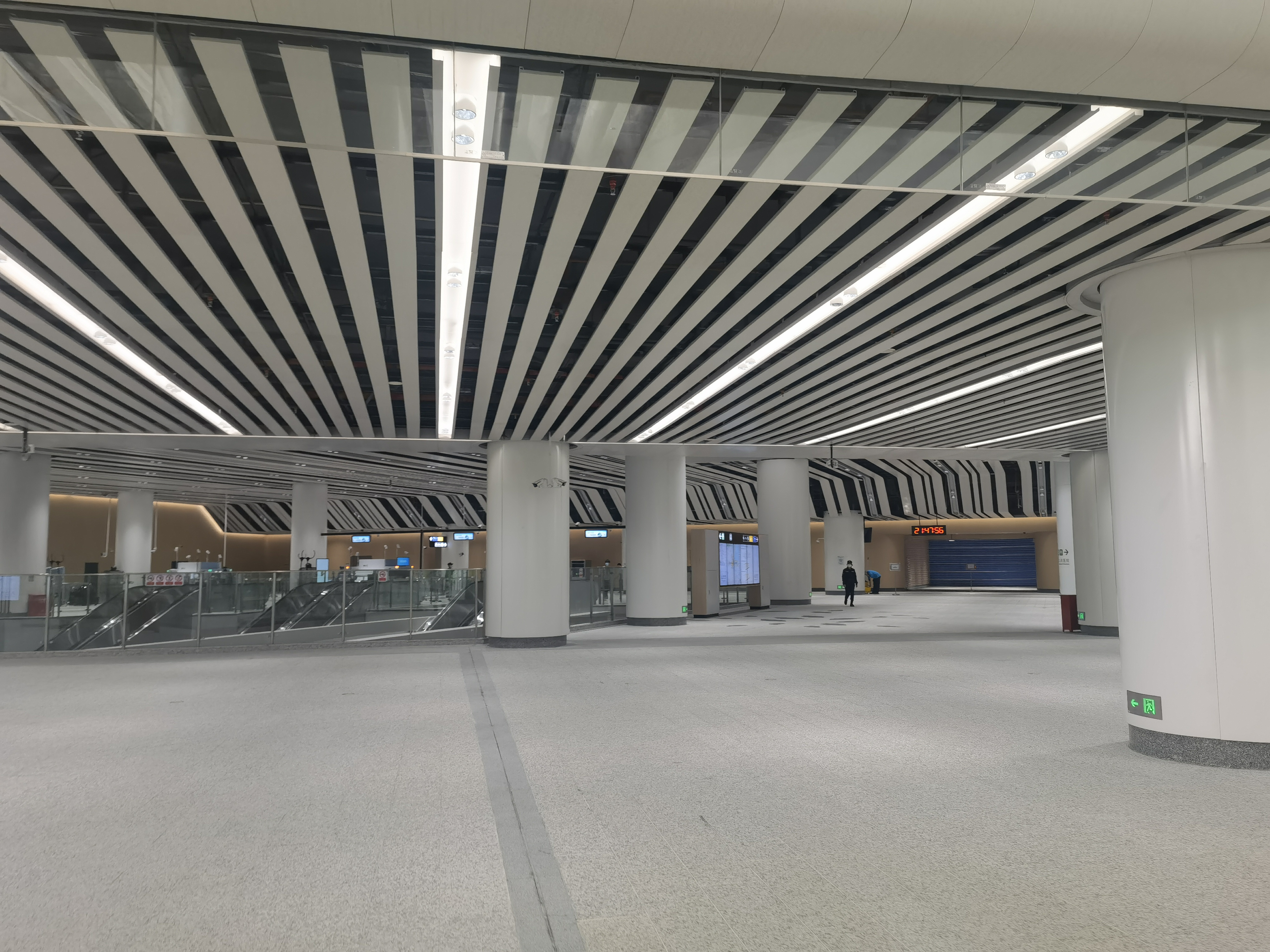
New concourse as part of the Huangmugang Comprehensive Transportation Hub Project

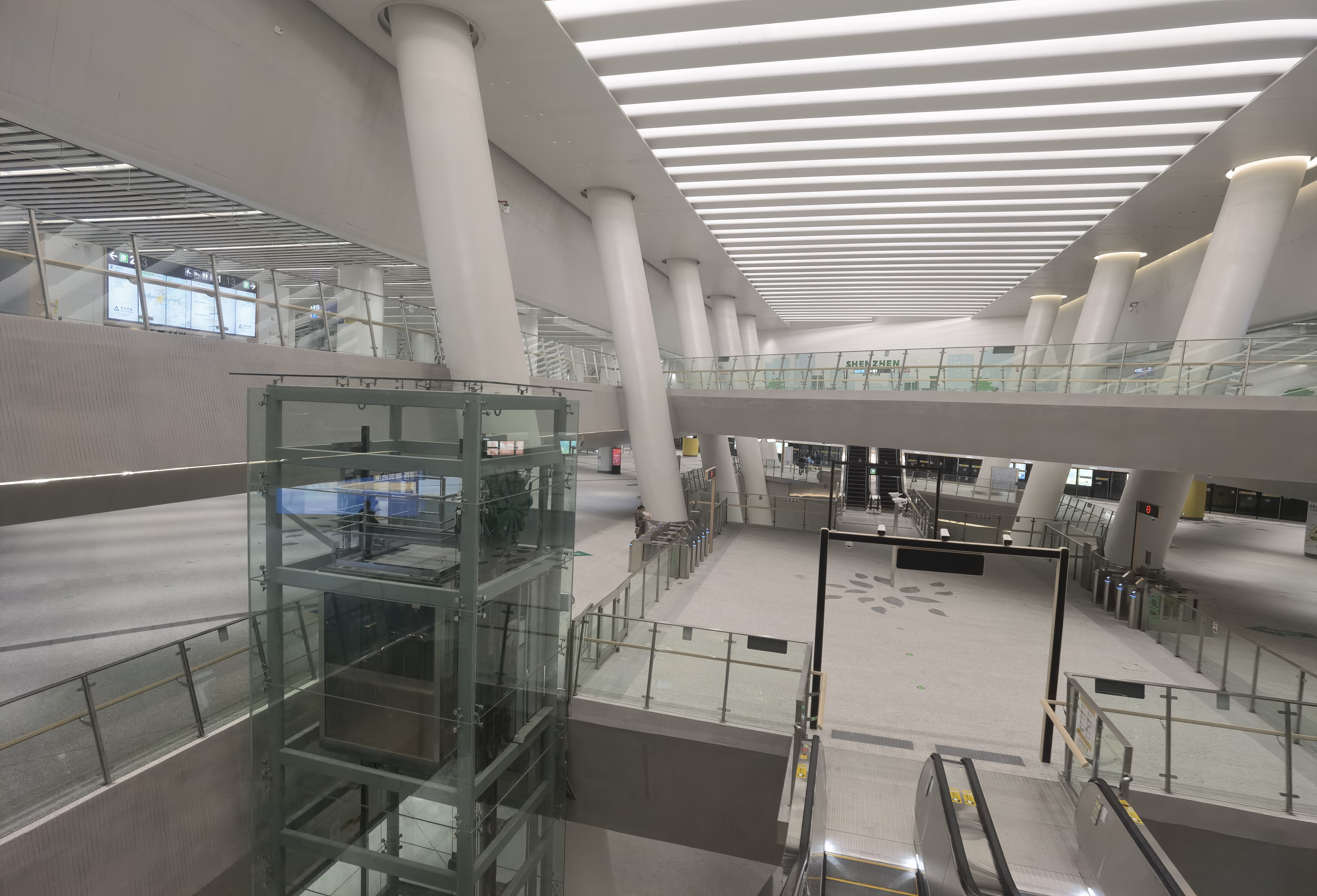
New concourse

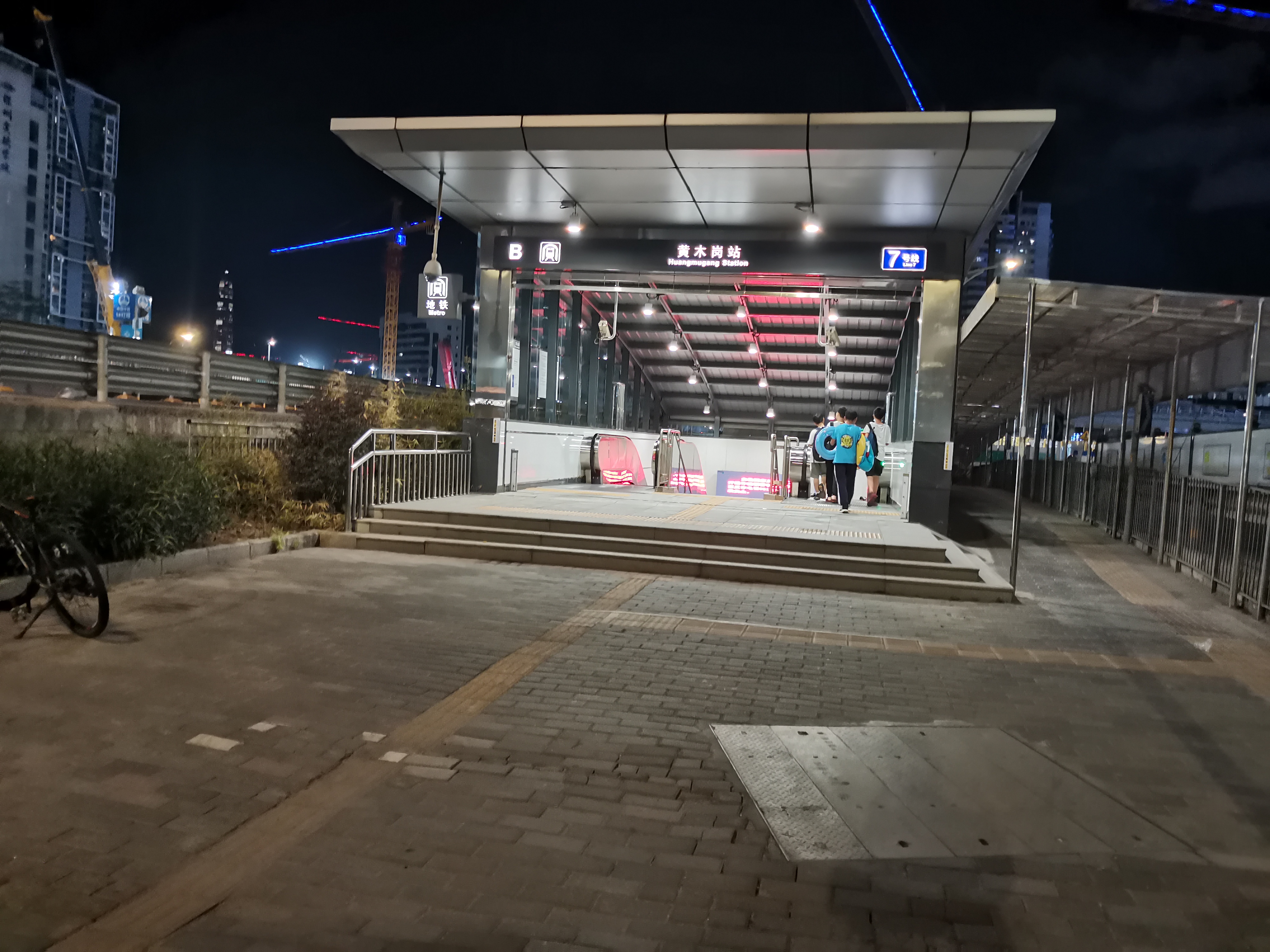
Former Exit B (now Exit 10)

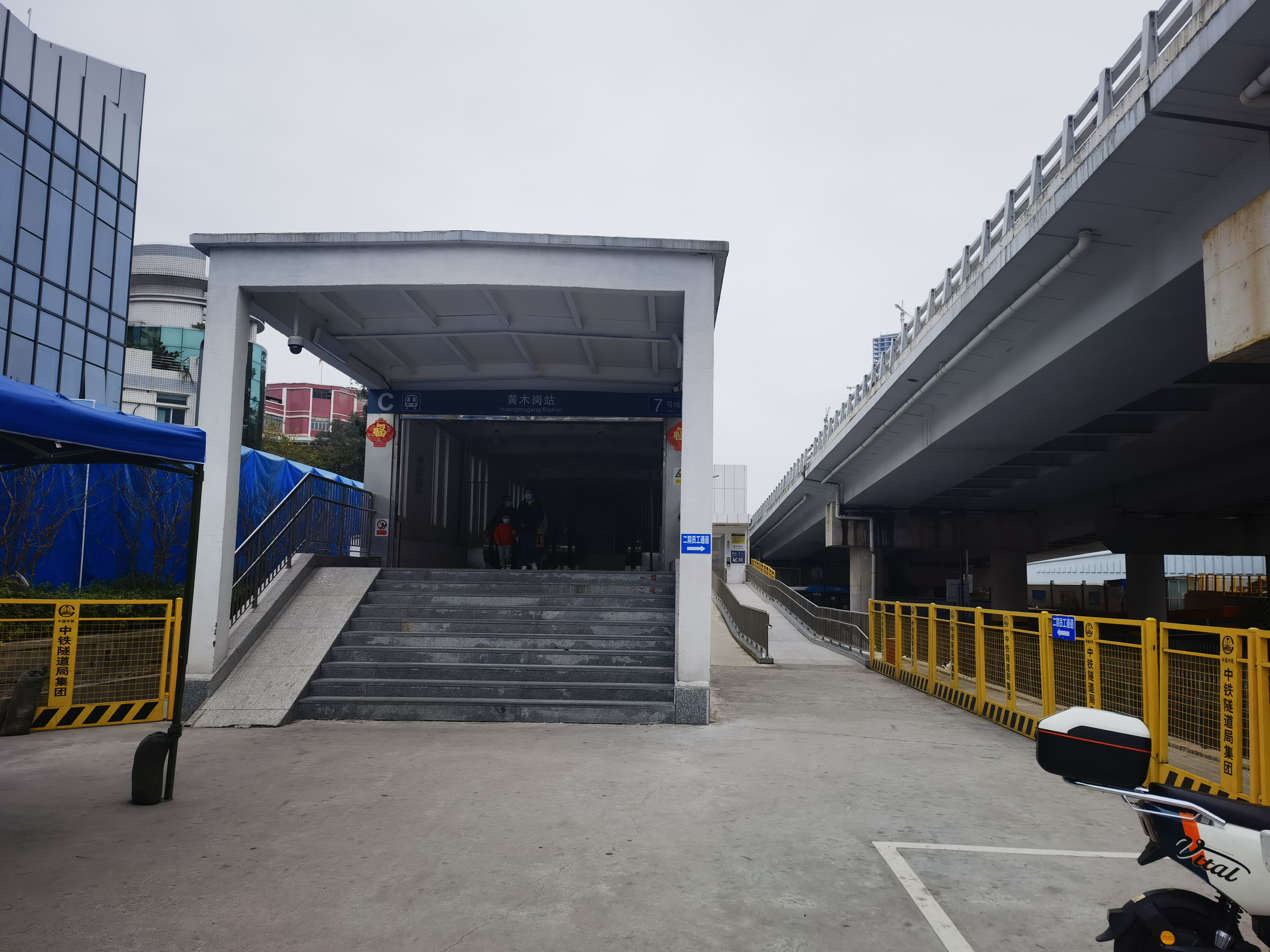
Former Exit C (now Exit 12a)

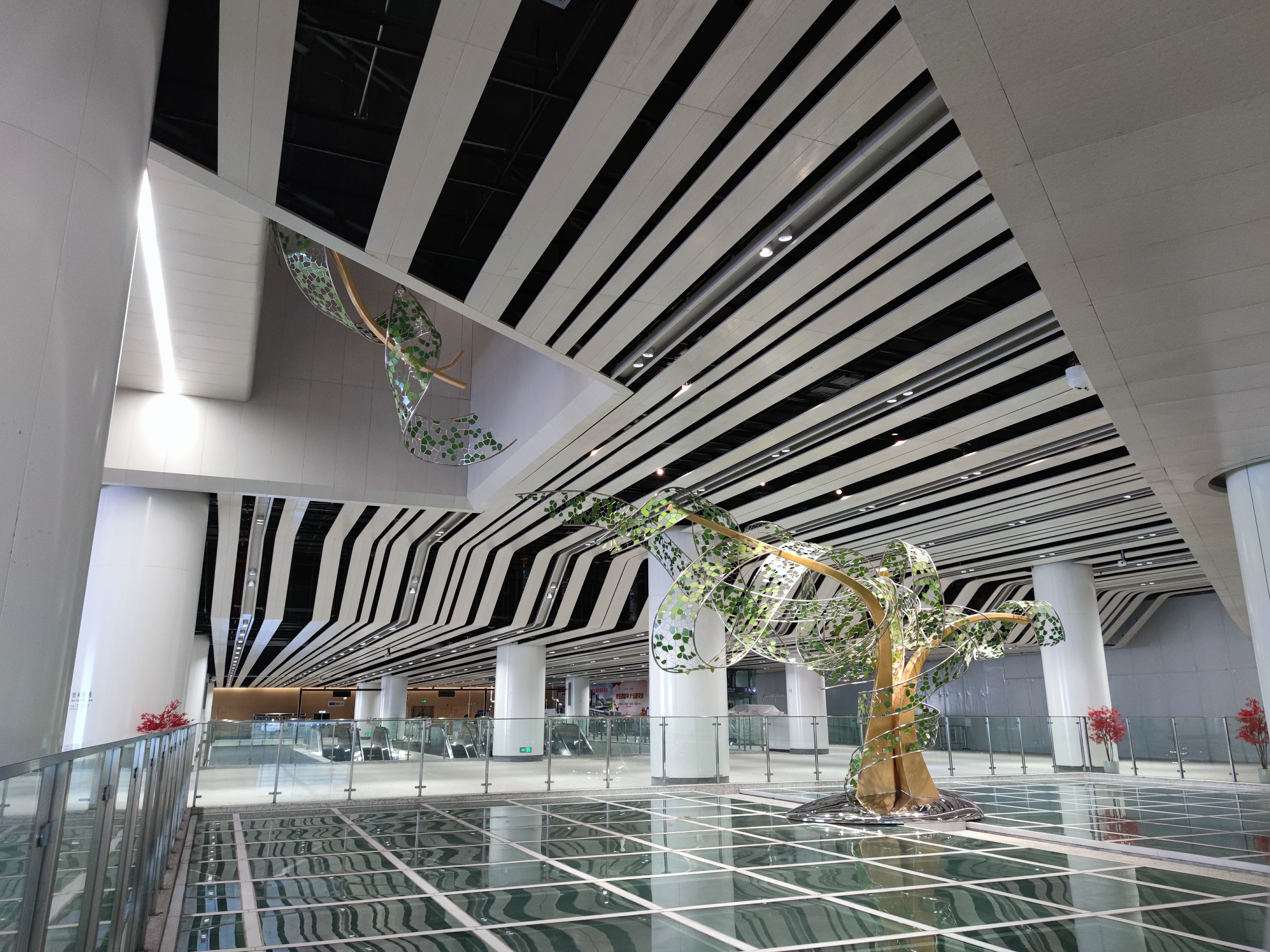
Huangmugang Comprehensive Transportation Hub integrated art installation - Everything Grows
