= Buji station =

Metro station in Shenzhen, Guangdong, China

Buji 布吉
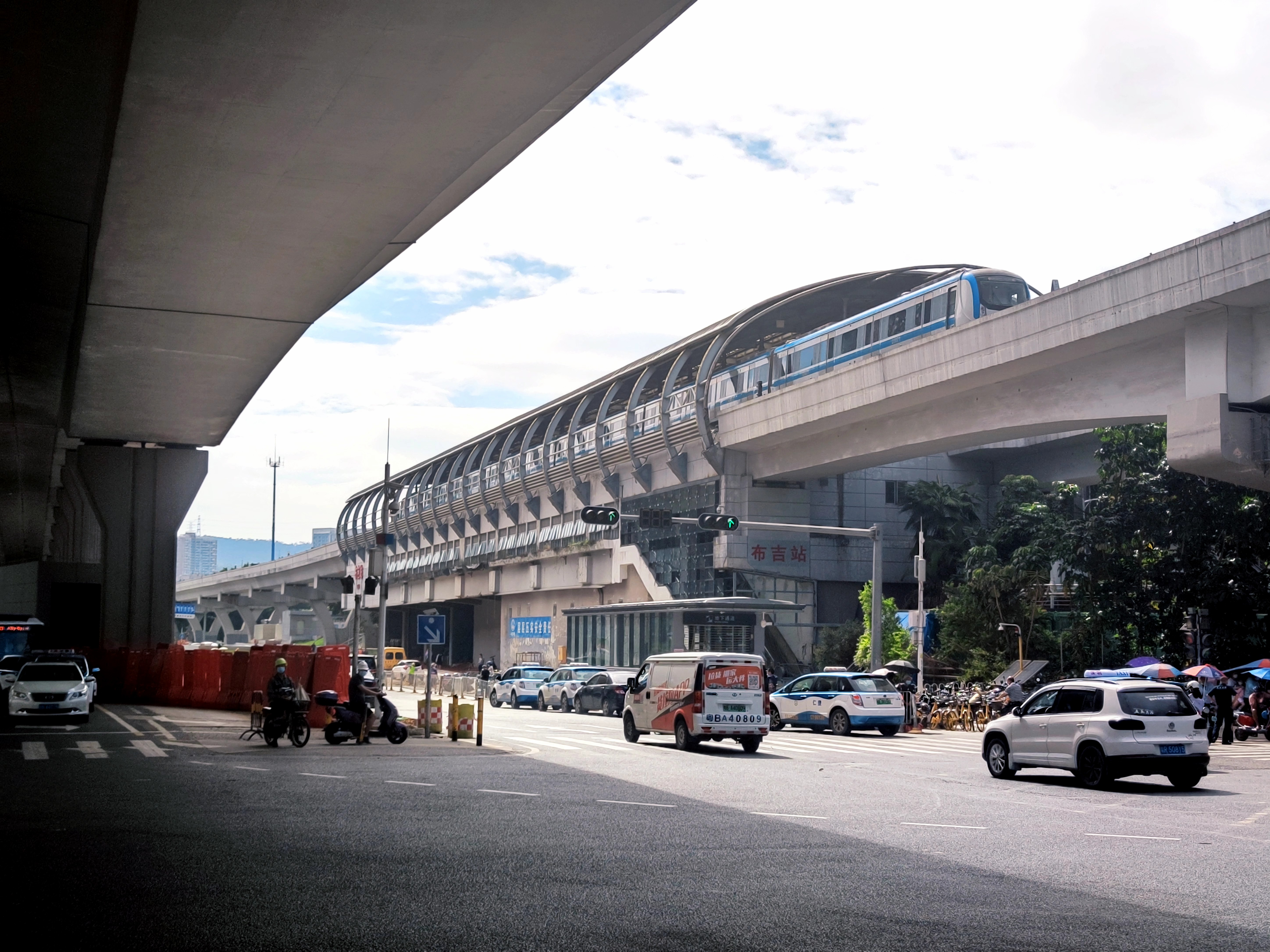
- Line 3 exterior view

General information
- Location: Buji Subdistrict, Longgang District, Shenzhen, Guangdong; China
- Coordinates: 22°36′5″N 114°7′18″E
- Operator: SZMC (Shenzhen Metro Group)
- Lines: Line 3; Line 5; Line 14
- Platforms: 6 (3 island platforms)
- Tracks: 6
- Connections: Shenzhen East

Construction
- Structure type: Elevated (Line 3); Underground (Line 5 & 14)
- Accessible: Yes

History
- Opened: Line 3: 28 December 2010 (15 years ago); Line 5: 22 June 2011 (15 years ago); Line 14: 28 October 2022 (3 years ago)

Passengers
- 58,699 daily (2015) (Ranked 7th of 118)

Services
Preceding station	Shenzhen Metro	Following station
Mumianwan towards Pingdi Liulian	Line 3	Caopu towards Futian Bonded Area
Baigelong towards Grand Theater	Line 5	Changlong towards Chiwan
Luohu North towards Gangxia North	Line 14	Shiyaling towards Shatian
Location

Buji station (Chinese: 布吉站; pinyin: Bùjí Zhàn; Jyutping: bou3 gat1 zaam6; Cantonese Yale: Bou Gāt Jaahm) is an interchange station on Line 3, Line 5 and Line 14 of the Shenzhen Metro. The Line 3 platforms opened on 28 December 2010, the Line 5 platforms opened on 22 June 2011 and the Line 14 platforms opened on 28 October 2022. Together with the co-located Shenzhen East railway station and two bus stations, it forms the Buji Transport Hub.

== Station layout ==
3F; Platforms	Platform	3 towards Futian Bonded Area (Caopu)
3F; Platforms	Island platform, doors will open on the left
3F; Platforms	Platform	3 towards Pingdi Liulian (Mumianwan)
2F; Concourse	Lobby of Line 3	Customer service, shops, vending machines, ATMs; Transfer passage between Line 3, Line 5 and Line 14
G	-	Exit
B1F; Concourse	Lobby of Line 5 and Line 14	Customer service, shops, vending machines, ATMs; Transfer passage between Line 3, Line 5 and Line 14
B2F; Platforms	Platform	5 towards Chiwan (Changlong)
B2F; Platforms	Island platform, doors will open on the left
B2F; Platforms	Platform	5 towards Grand Theater (Baigelong)
B3F; Platforms	Platform	14 towards Gangxia North (Luohu North)
B3F; Platforms	Island platform, doors will open on the left
B3F; Platforms	Platform	14 towards Shatian (Shiyaling)

== Entrances/exits ==
Buji station has a total of nine exits.

- Line 3 has three exits, with exits A1 and B directly connecting to the third-floor platform of Shenzhen East railway station.
- Line 5 has two exits. Its section is located in the underground hall of the East Square of Shenzhen East railway station. There are passageways connecting to the West Square of Shenzhen East railway station and various locations in Buji Transport Hub.
- Line 14 has four exits, with exits C and E1 equipped with elevators.

Exit	Pictures	Destination
A		West side of Longgang Blvd (C), south side of Tiedong Road (E)
A 1		West side of Longgang Blvd (N), north side of Tiedong Road, Shenzhen East Station lobby
B		West side of Longgang Blvd (S), Shenzhen East Station lobby
C		North side of Longgang Blvd (W), Shenzhen East Station, Shenzhen East Station East Square
D		South side of Longgang Blvd (W), east side of Baige Rd, Baihexingcheng Phase 1, Mantingfang Garden, Jingnan Huating
E 1		East side of Longgang Blvd (N), Longwei Gardens, Xinjiyuan Industrial Zone
E 2		East side of Longgang Blvd (N), Longwei Gardens, Xinjiyuan Industrial Zone
SE 2		West side of Longgang Blvd (C), south side of Tiedong Road (E)
SE 3		South side of Tiedong Road (W), Shenzhen East Station Bus Terminal

== Gallery ==
=== ■ Line 3 ===
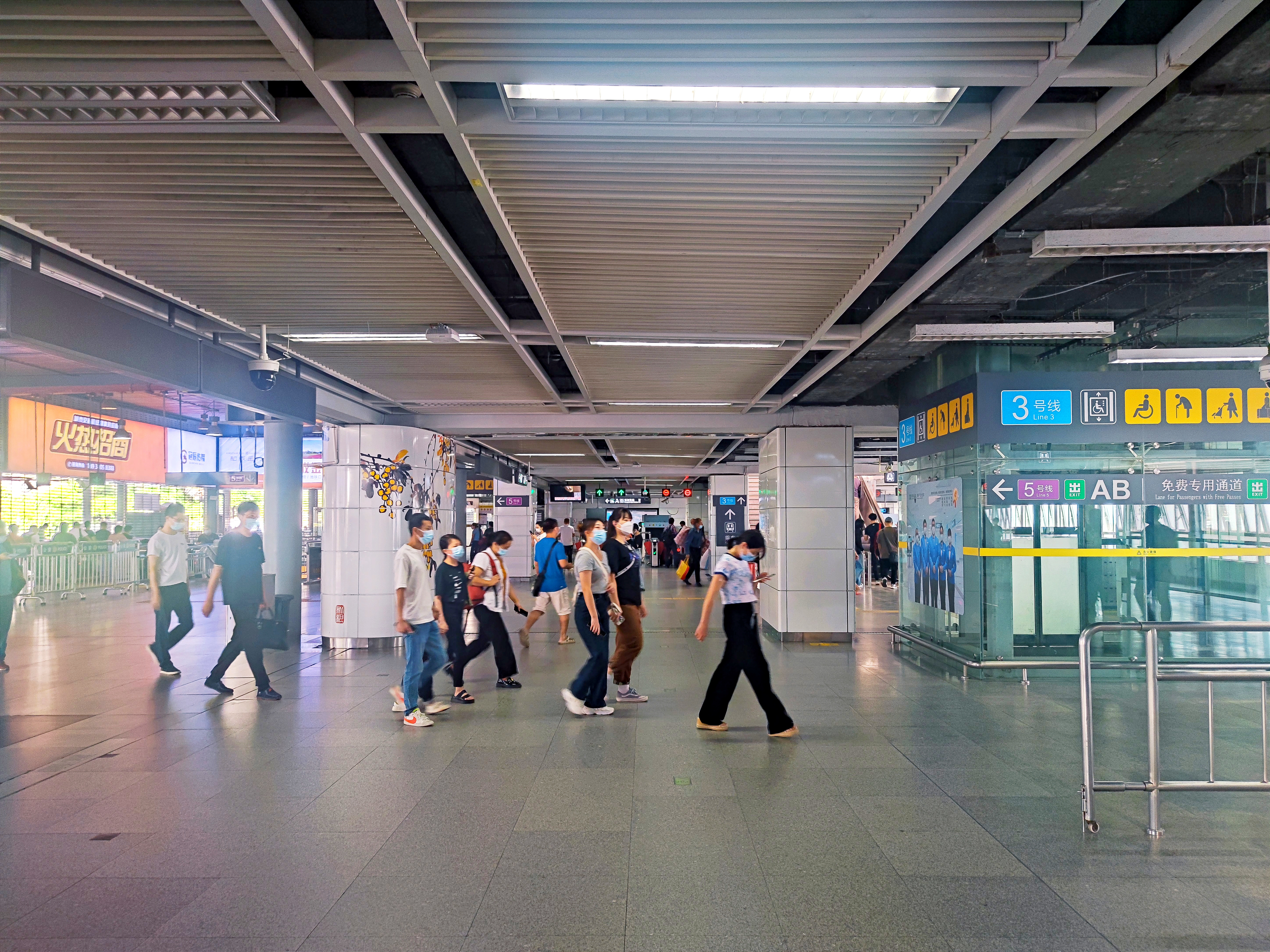
Line 3 original concourse

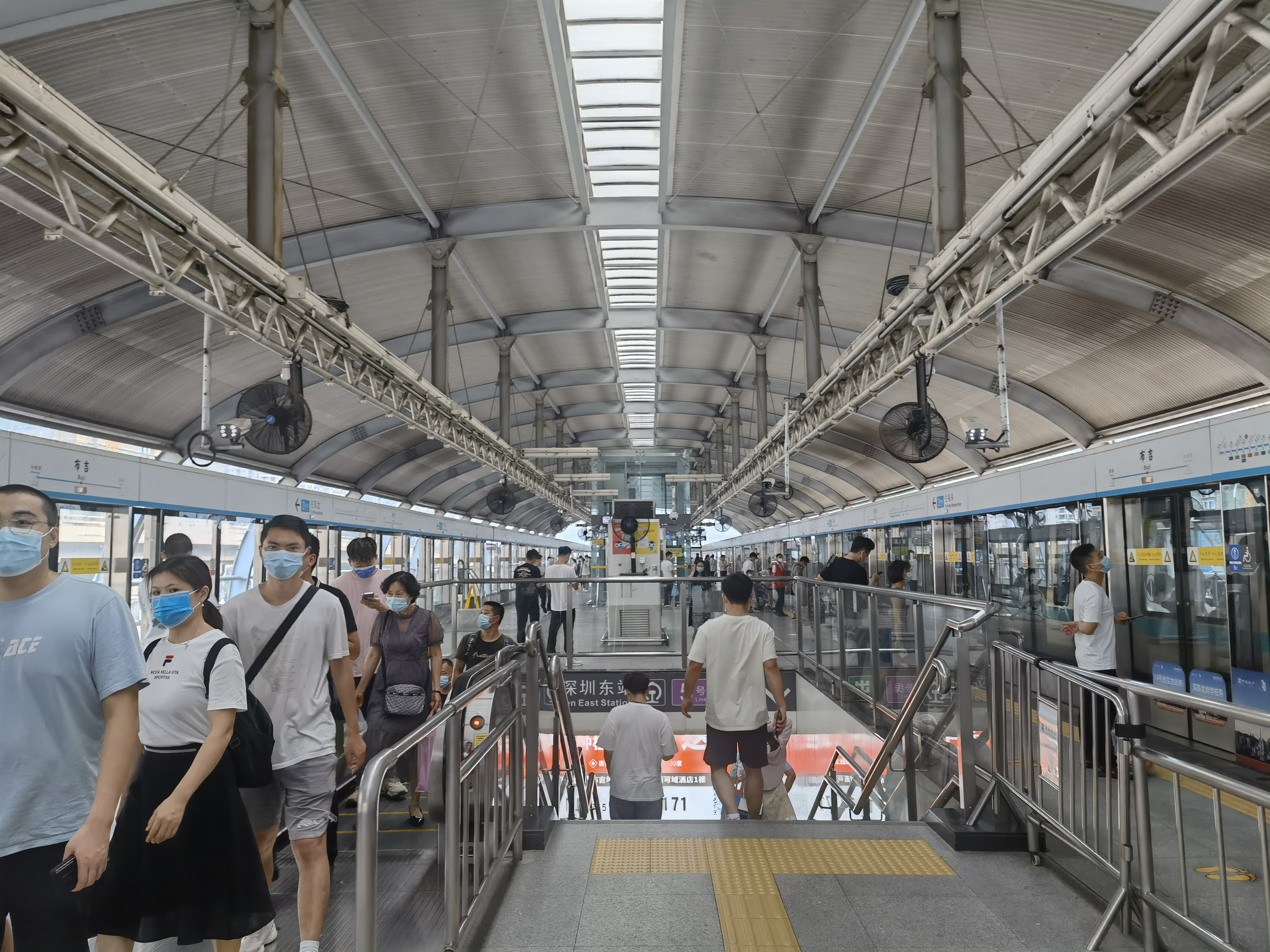
Line 3 platform

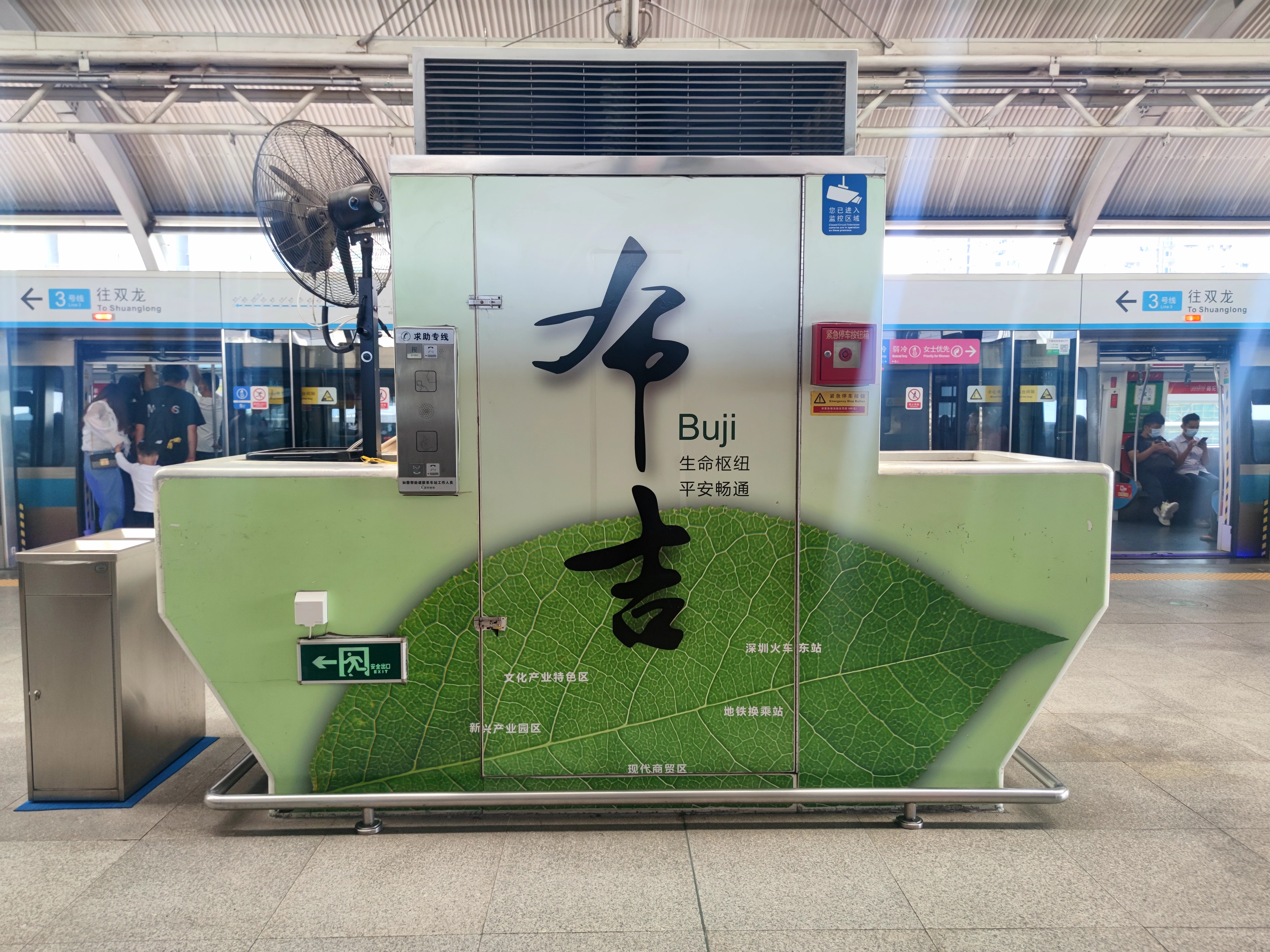
Line 3 platform calligraphy

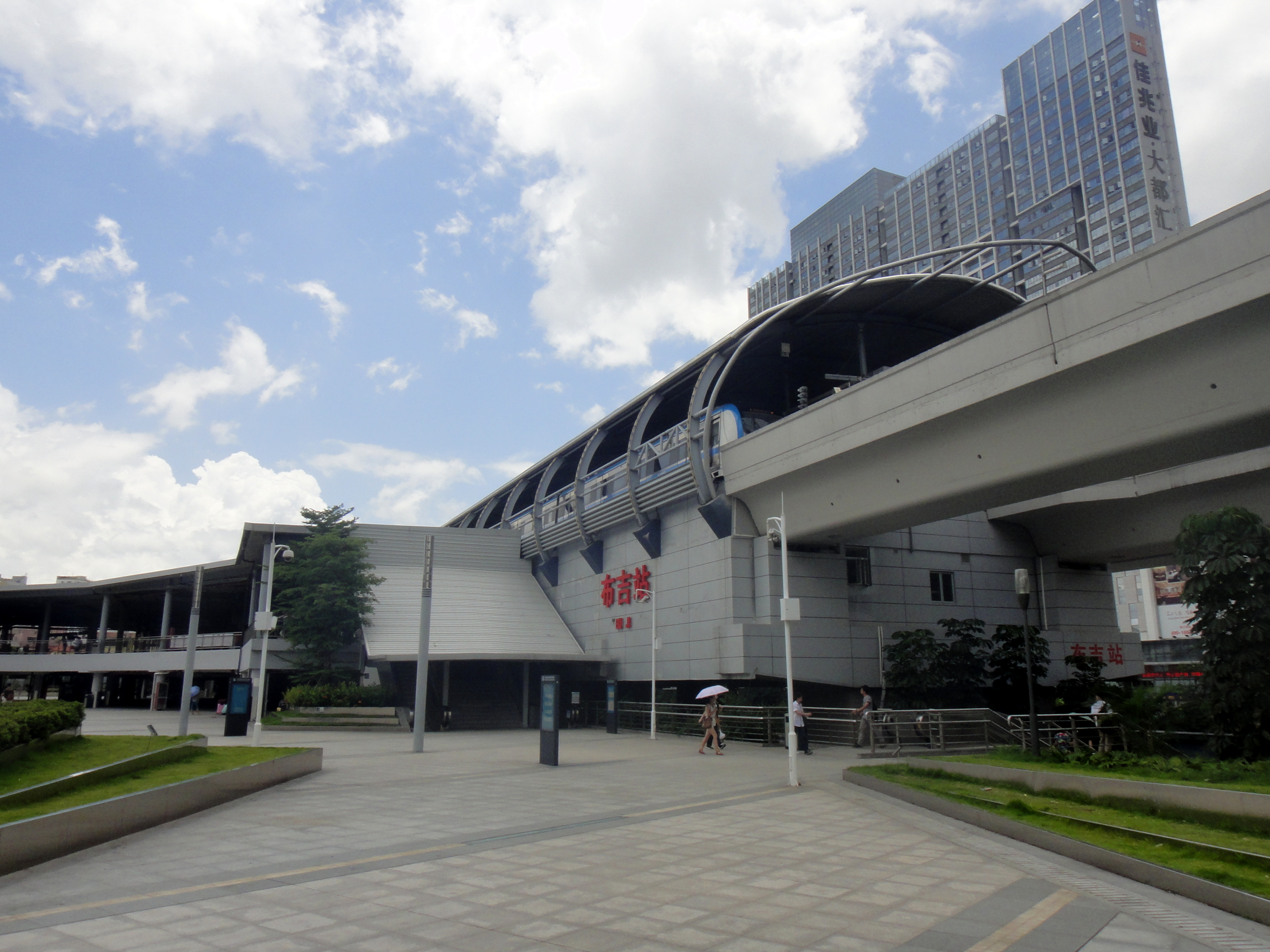
Line 3 exterior view prior to renovation

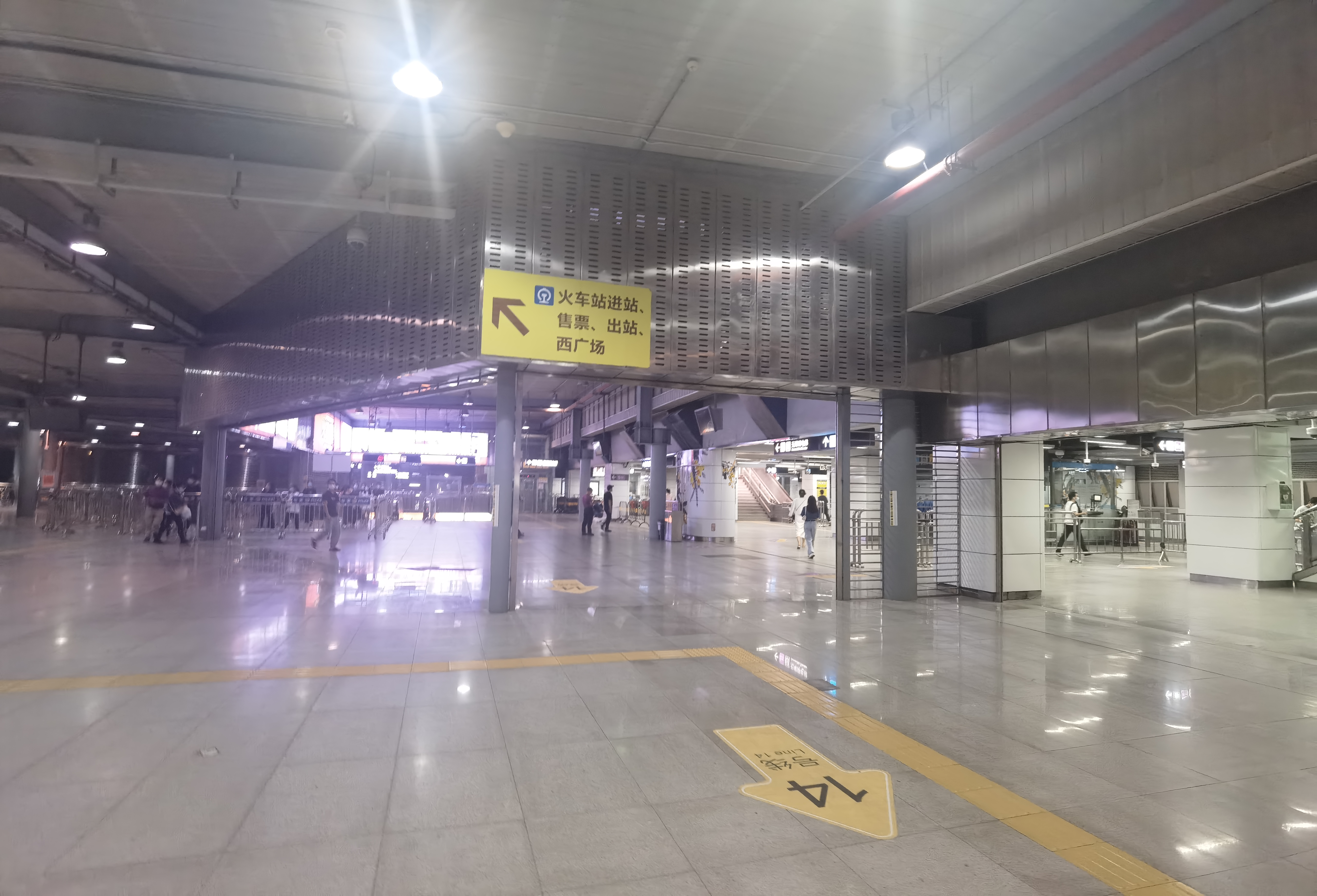
Line 3 concourse after renovation

=== ■ Line 5 ===
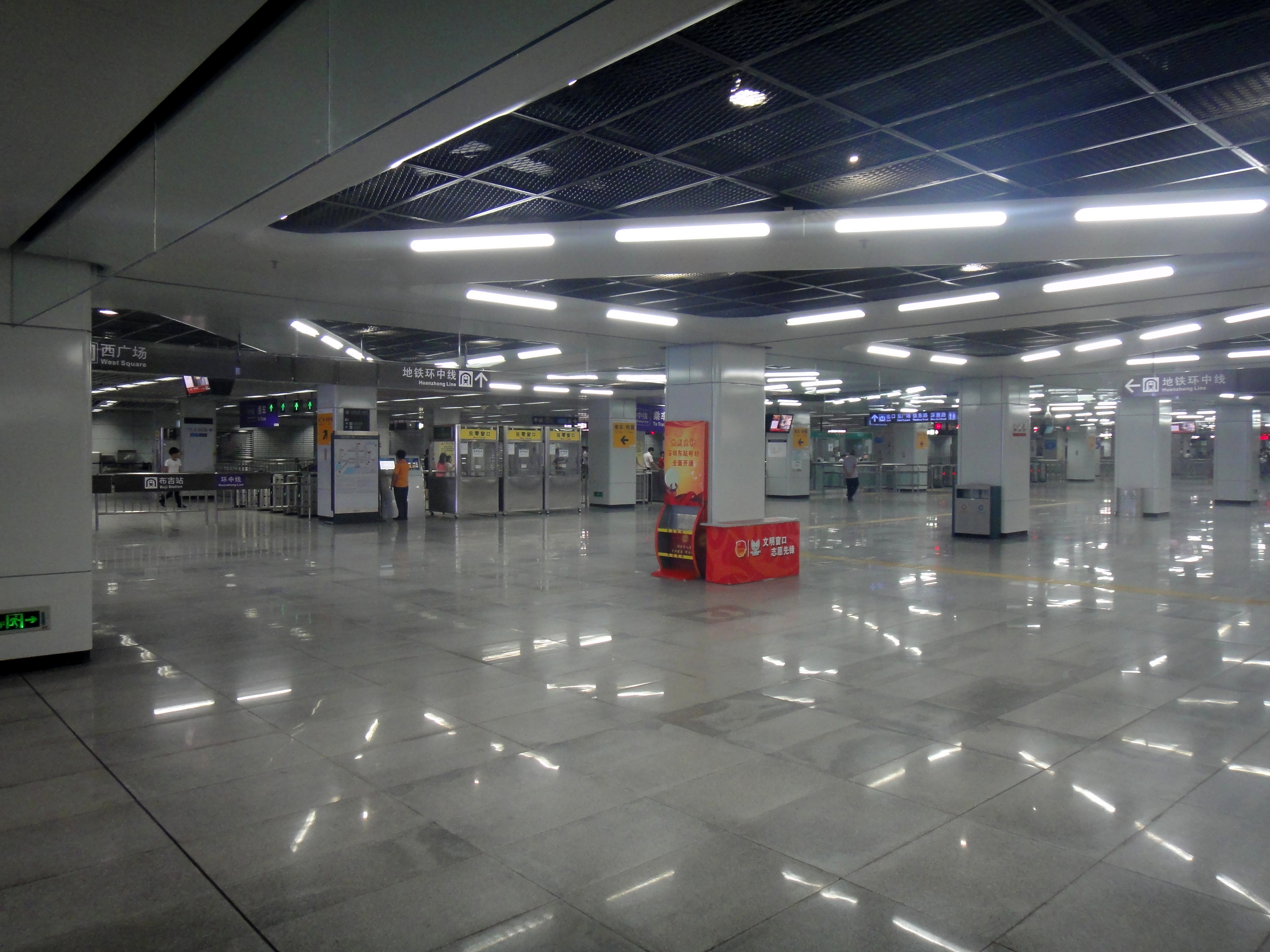
Line 5 original concourse

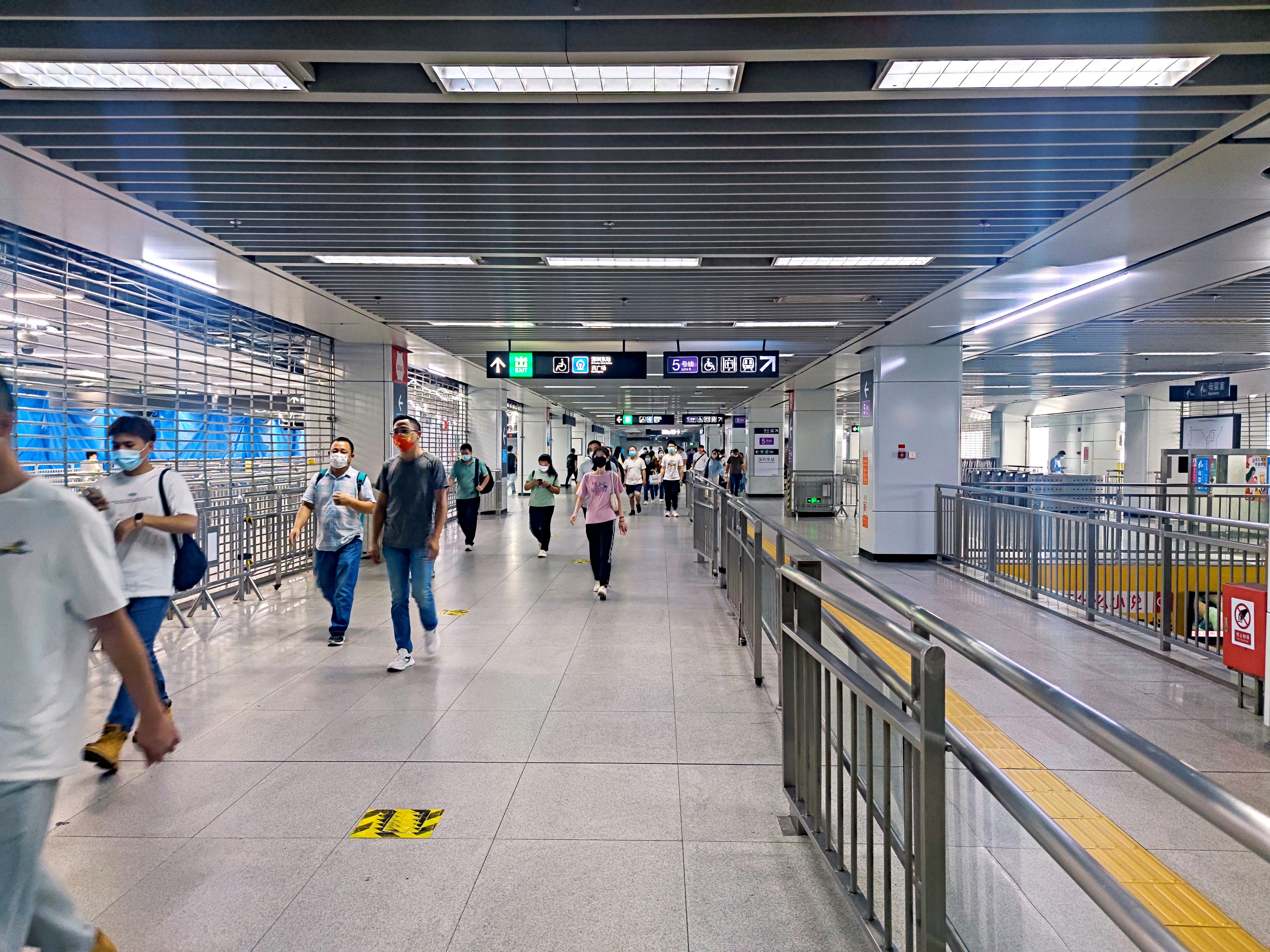
Line 5 concourse

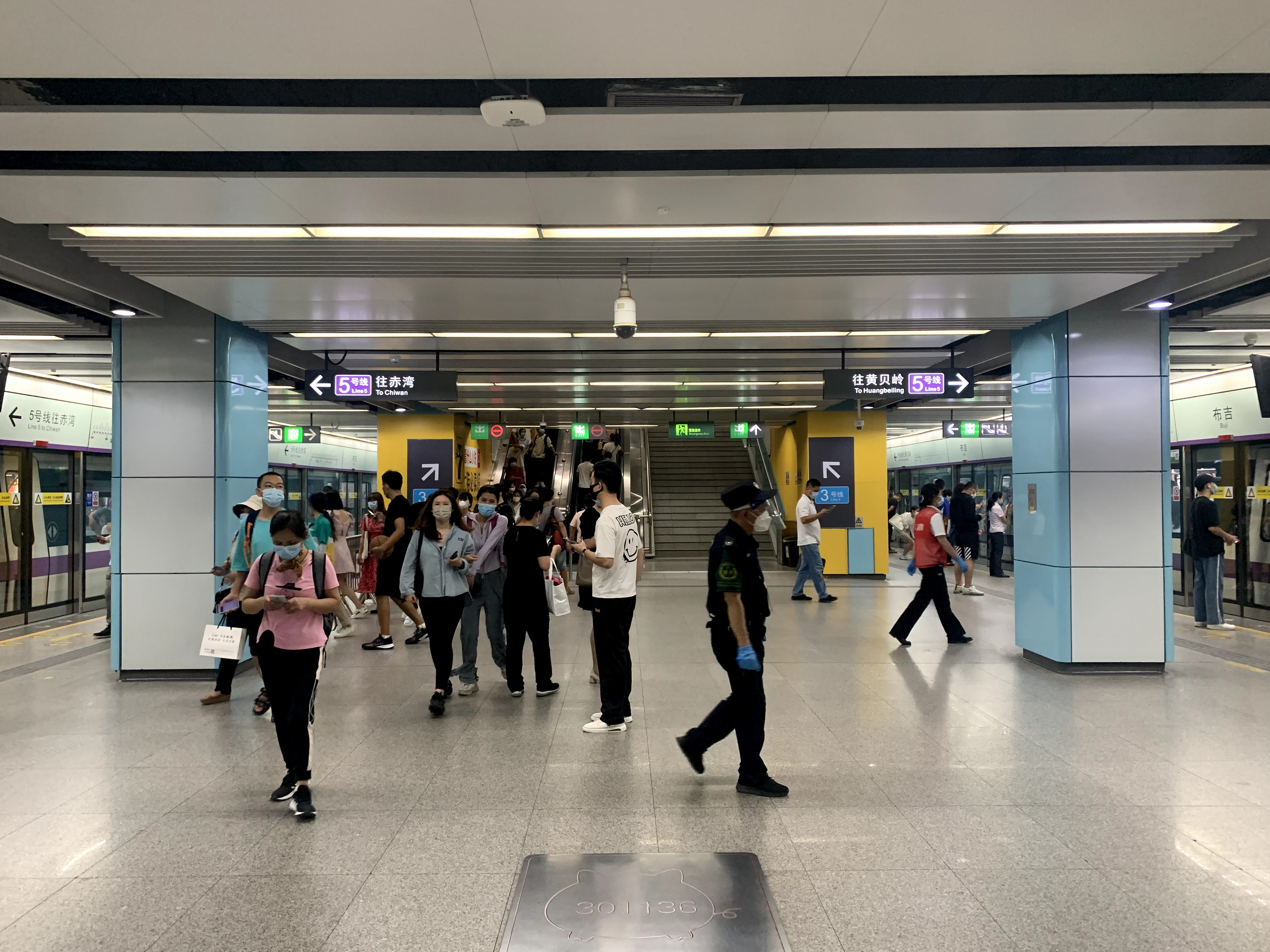
Line 5 platform

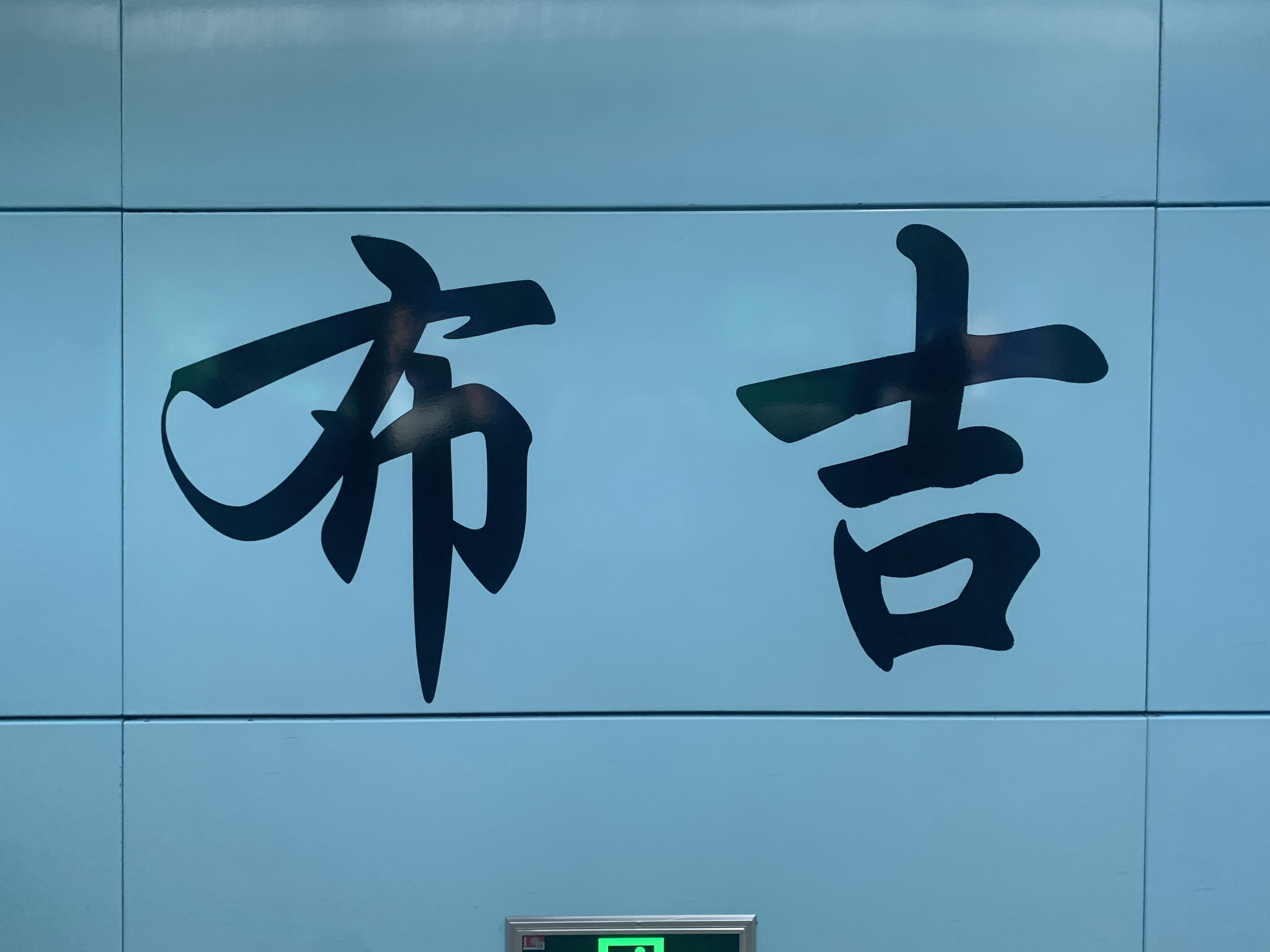
Line 5 platform calligraphy

=== ■ Line 14 ===
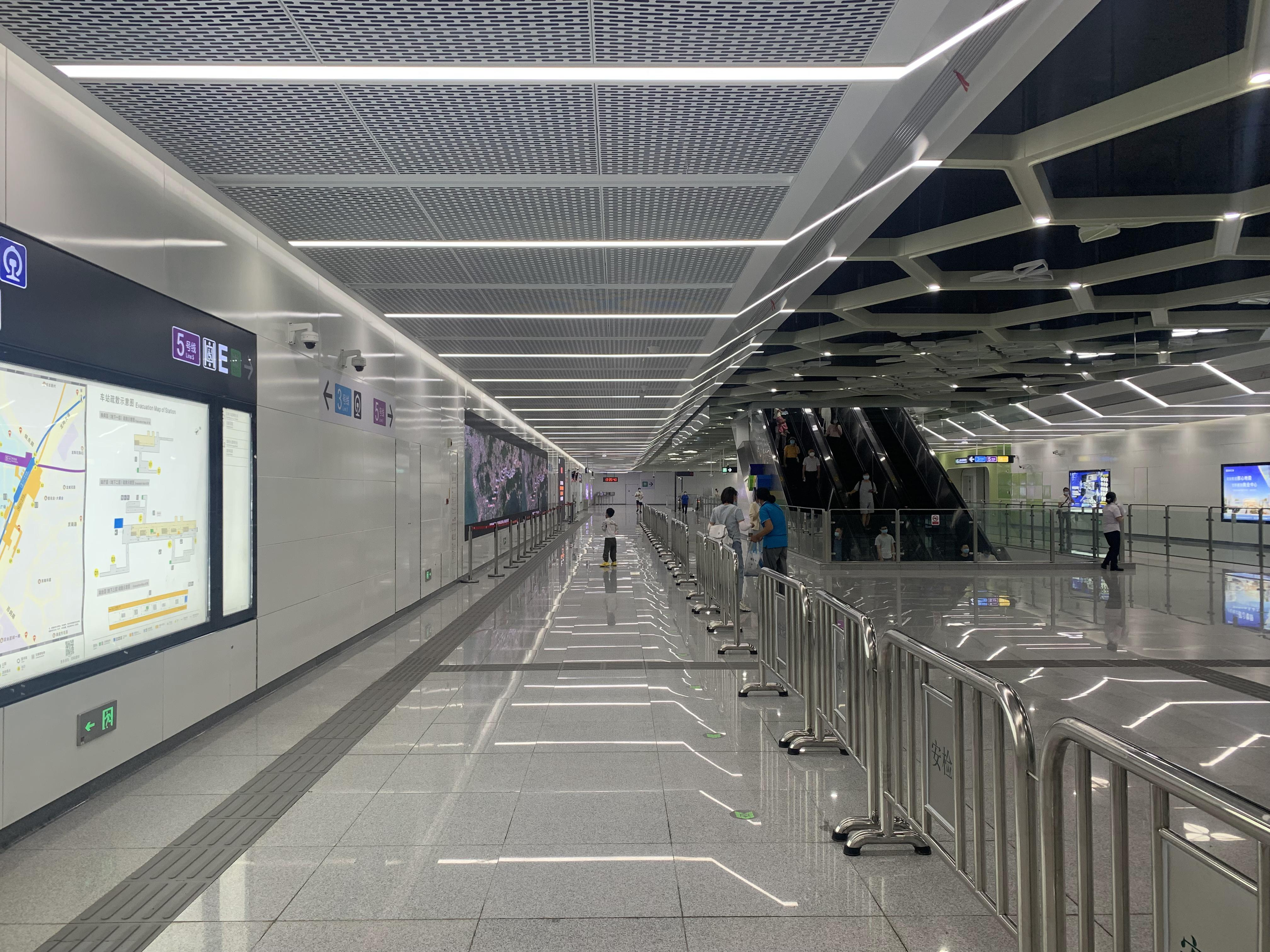
Line 14 concourse

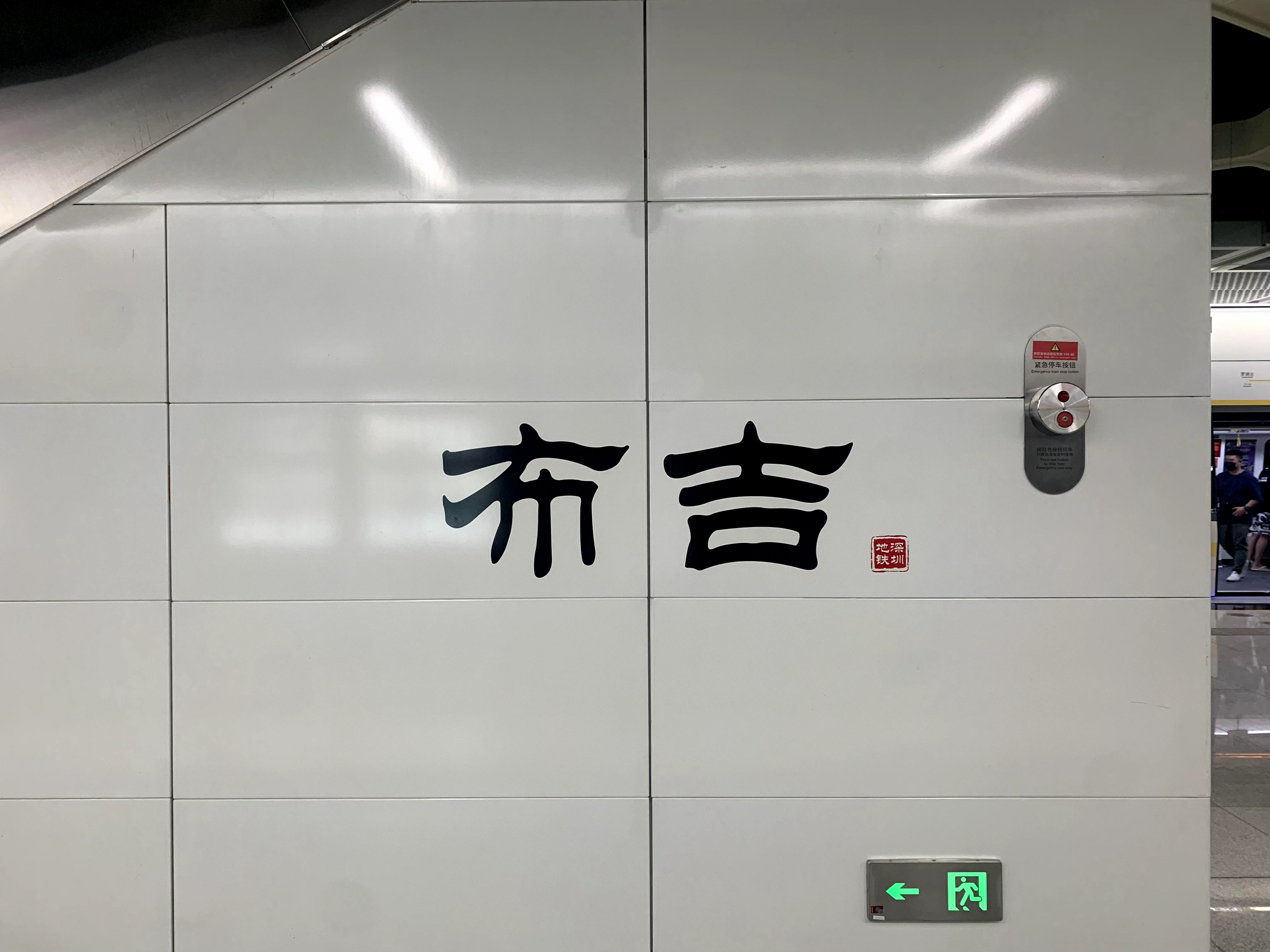
Line 14 platform calligraphy

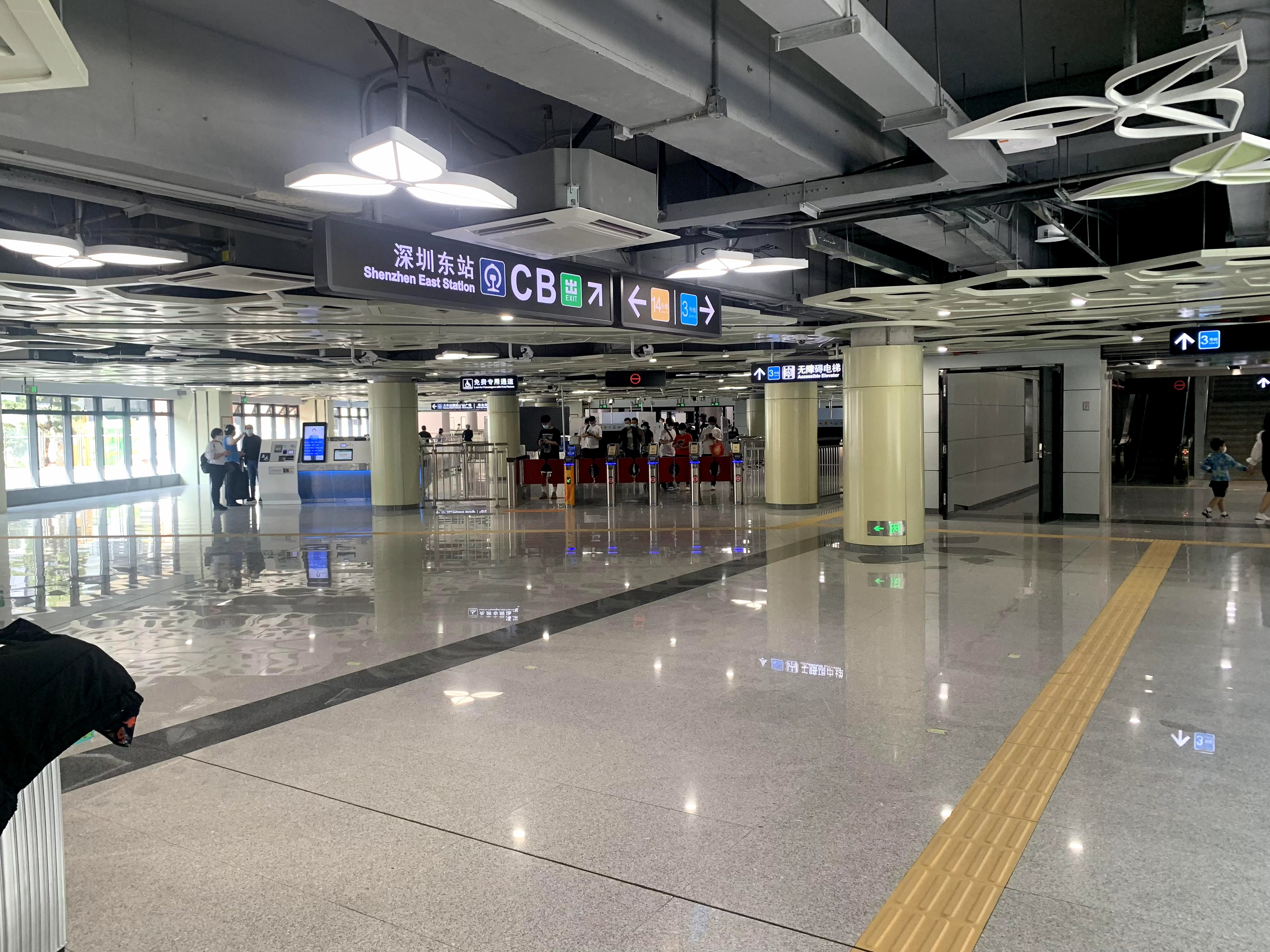
Former Exit B converted to surface Line 14 minor concourse
