= Liangmao Hill station =

Metro station in Shenzhen, China

Coordinates: 22°32′58″N 114°7′22″E

Liangmao Hill 凉帽山
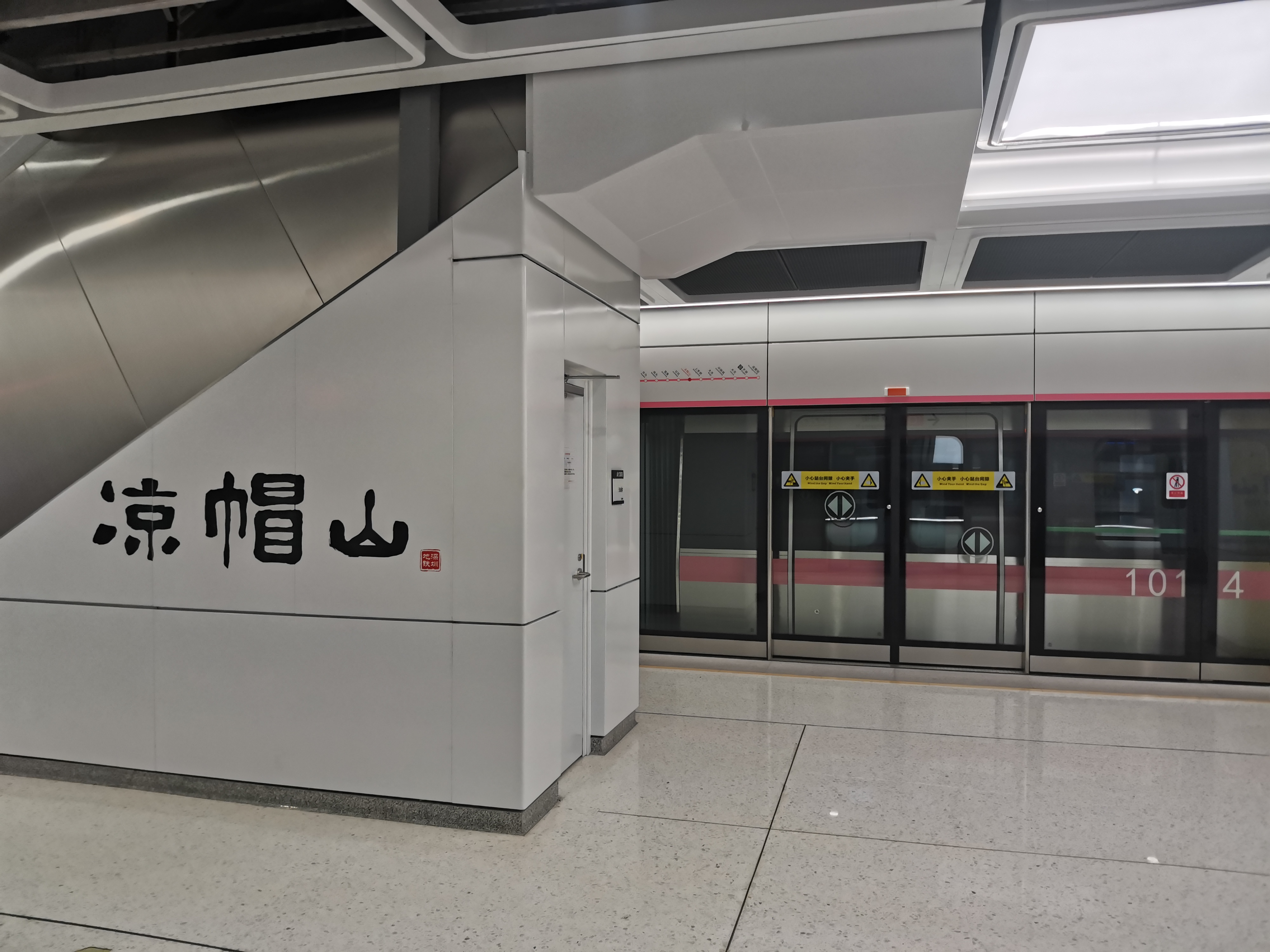

General information
- Location: Longgang District, Shenzhen, Guangdong; China
- Operated by: SZMC (Shenzhen Metro Group)
- Line: Line 10
- Platforms: 4 (2 island platforms)
- Tracks: 3

Construction
- Structure type: Underground
- Accessible: Yes

History
- Opened: 18 August 2020

Services
Preceding station	Shenzhen Metro	Following station
Shanglilang towards Shuangyong Street	Line 10	Gankeng towards Futian Checkpoint
Location

Liangmao Hill station (Chinese: 凉帽山站; pinyin: Liángmàoshān Zhàn) is a station on Line 10 of the Shenzhen Metro. It opened on August 18, 2020.

== Station layout ==
G	-	Exit
B1F; Concourse	Lobby	Customer Service, Shops, Vending machines, ATMs
B2F; Platforms	Platform	← Line 10 towards Futian Checkpoint (Gankeng)
B2F; Platforms	Island platform, doors will open on the left
B2F; Platforms	Platform ↑ Platform ↓	No regular service
B2F; Platforms	Island platform, doors will open on the left
B2F; Platforms	Platform	→ Line 10 towards Shuangyong Street (Shanglilang) →

== Exits ==
Exit		Destination
Exit A		
Exit B		BHD International Hotel
Exit D	D1	Zhonghaixin Innovation Industrial City
Exit D	D2	Zhonghaixin Innovation Industrial City
