= Luohu North station =

Metro station in Shenzhen, China

Luohu North 罗湖北
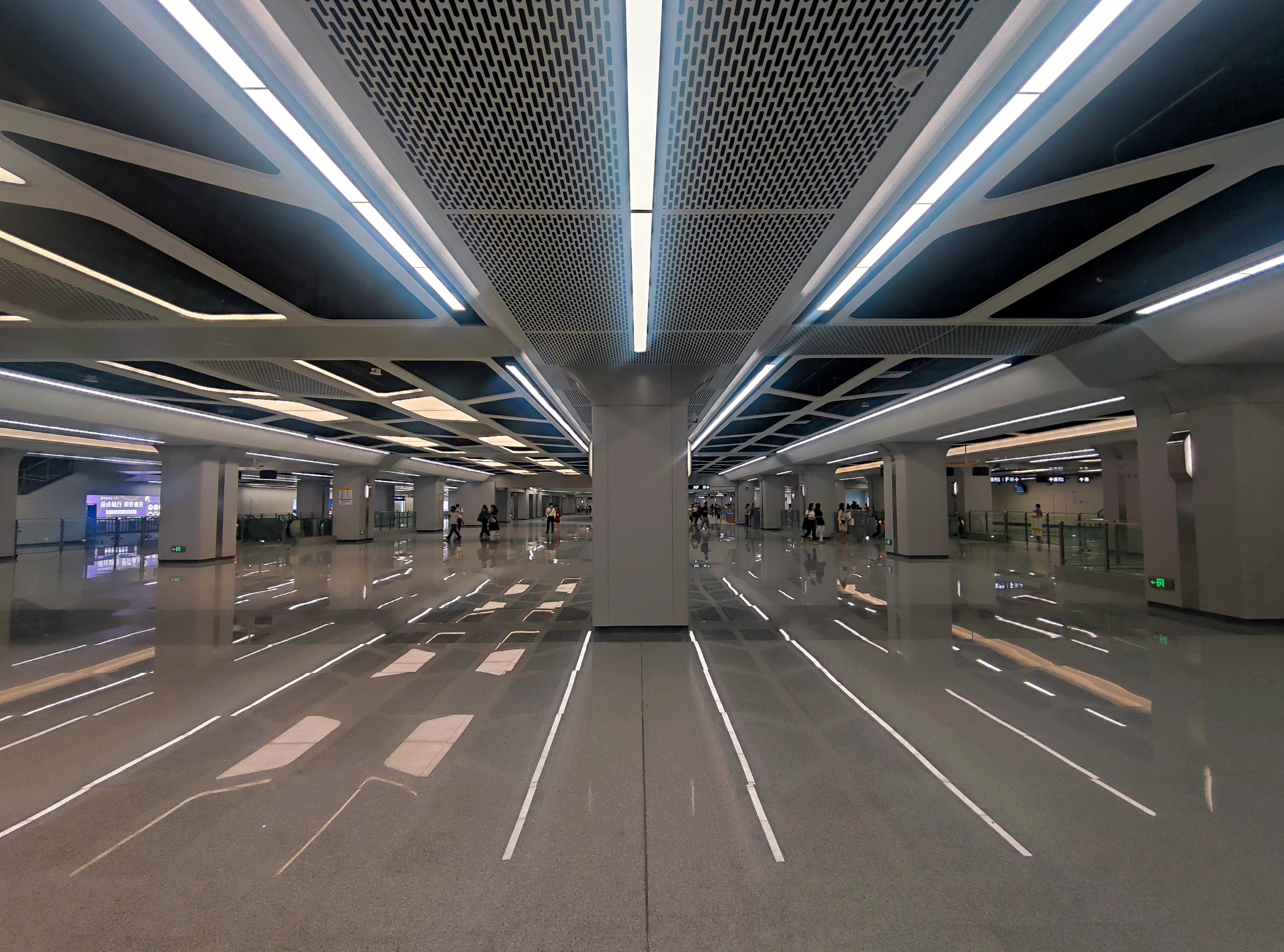
- Concourse

General information
- Location: Luohu, Shenzhen, Guangdong; China
- Coordinates: 22.5833°N 114.1079°E
- Operated by: SZMC (Shenzhen Metro Group)
- Line: Line 14
- Platforms: 4 (2 island platforms)
- Tracks: 3

Construction
- Structure type: Underground
- Accessible: Yes

History
- Opened: 28 October 2022

Services
Preceding station	Shenzhen Metro	Following station
Huangmugang towards Gangxia North	Line 14	Buji towards Shatian
Location

Luohu North station (Chinese: 罗湖北站; pinyin: Luóhú Běi Zhàn; Jyutping: lo4 wu4 bak1 zaam6) is a station of Shenzhen Metro Line 14. It opened on 28 October 2022. It is part of the Luohu North transport hub integrated with the under construction Luohu North railway station which is part of the Shenzhen–Shanwei high-speed railway.

== Station layout ==
G	-	Exit
B1F; Concourse	Lobby	Customer Service, Shops, Vending machines, ATMs
B2F; Platforms	Platform	17 reserved platform
B2F; Platforms	Island platform, doors will open on the left for 17 / right for 14
B2F; Platforms	Platform	14 towards Gangxia North (Huangmugang)
B2F; Platforms	Side track	For trains of Line 14
B2F; Platforms	Platform	14 towards Shatian (Buji)
B2F; Platforms	Island platform, doors will open on the left for 17 / right for 14
B2F; Platforms	Platform	17 reserved platform

== Exits ==
Exit	Destination
Exit A	North side of Qingshuihe 1st Rd (E)
Exit B	East side of Qingshuihe 5th Rd (S), Huangsheng Garden
Exit C	East side of Qingshuihe 5th Rd (N), South side of Qingshuihe 2nd Rd (W)
Exit D	East side of Qingshuihe 5th Rd (N), East side of Huancang Rd, Qingshuihe Village
Exit E	Reserved
Exit F	South side of Qingshuihe 2nd Rd (W)
Exit G	West side of Qingshuihe 5th Rd (N)
Exit H	North side of Qingshuihe 1st Rd (W), West side of Qingshuihe 5th Rd (S), Luohu Affiliated School of Education
Exit J	Reserved

== Gallery ==
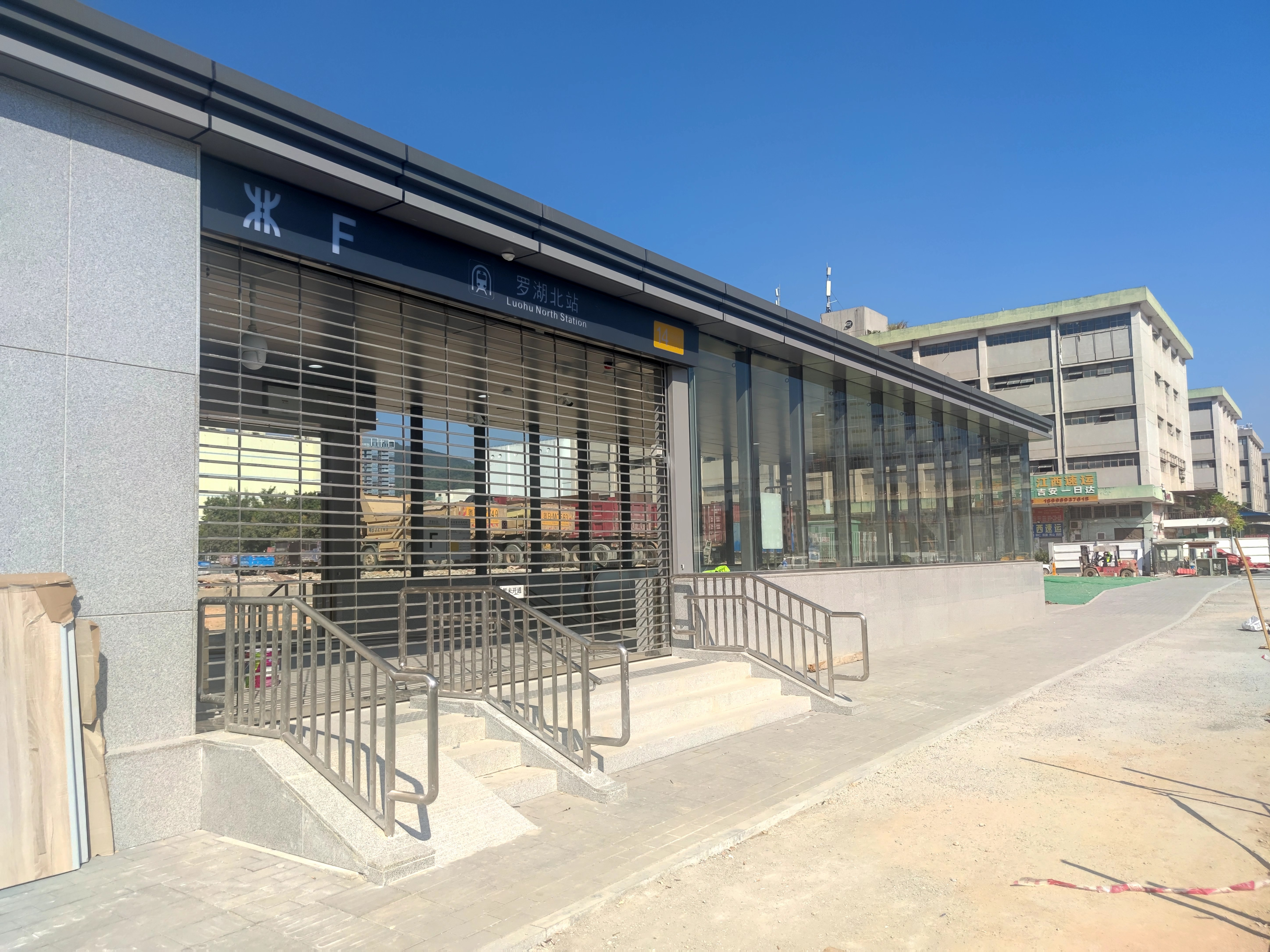
Exit F (before Line 14 was opened)

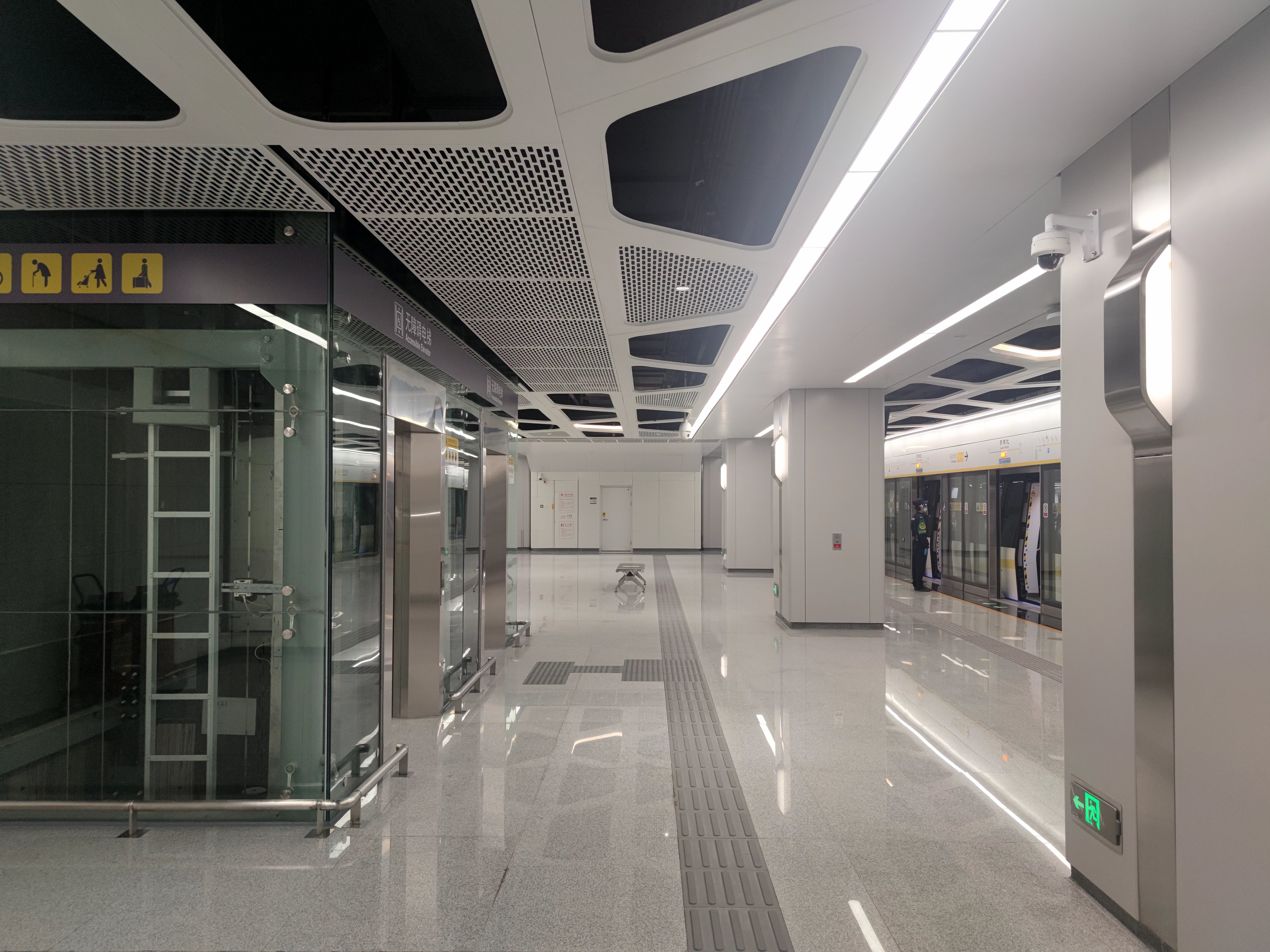
Platform

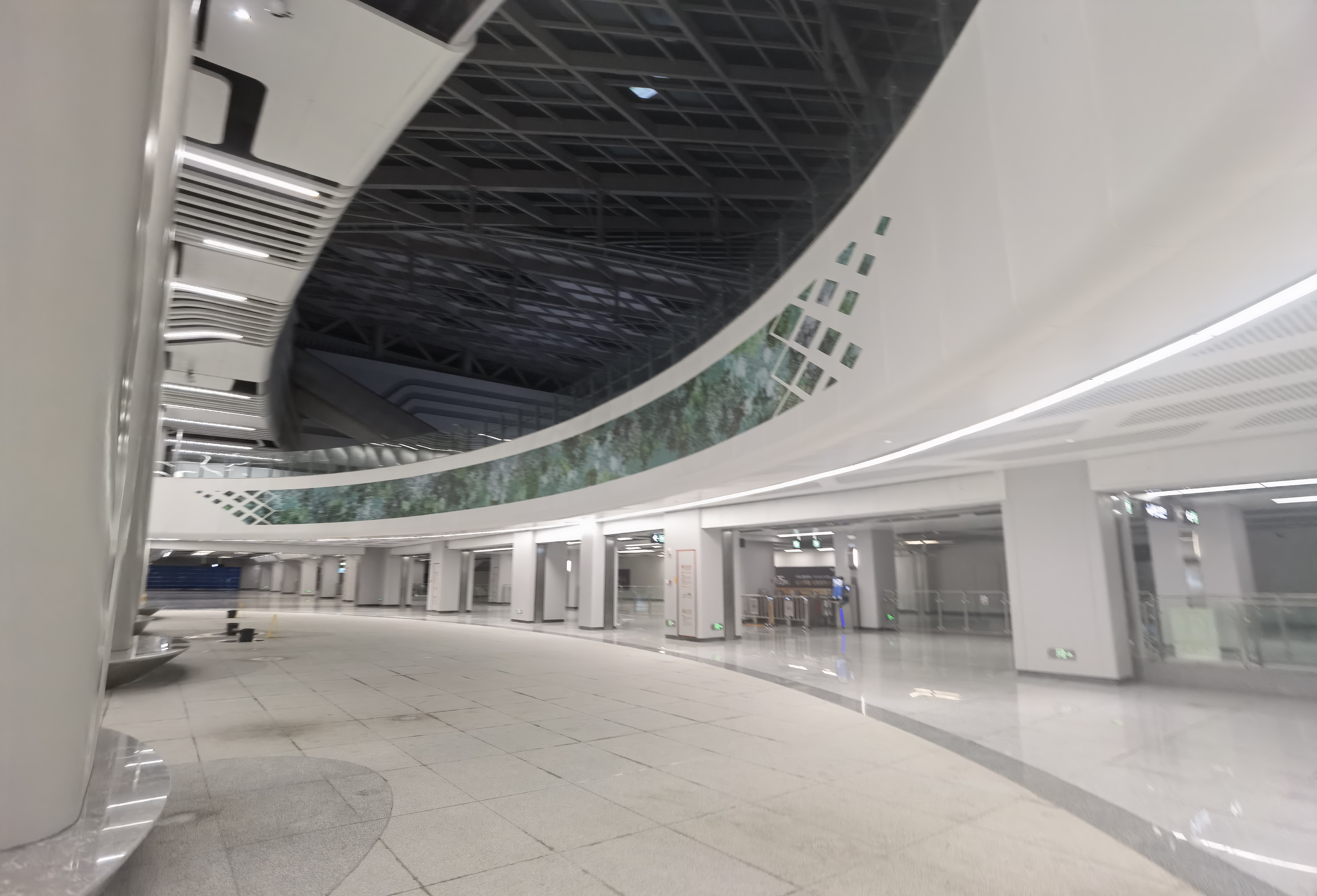
Artwall
