= Shanglilang station =

Metro station in Shenzhen, Guangdong, China

Coordinates: 22°32′58″N 114°7′22″E

Shanglilang 上李朗
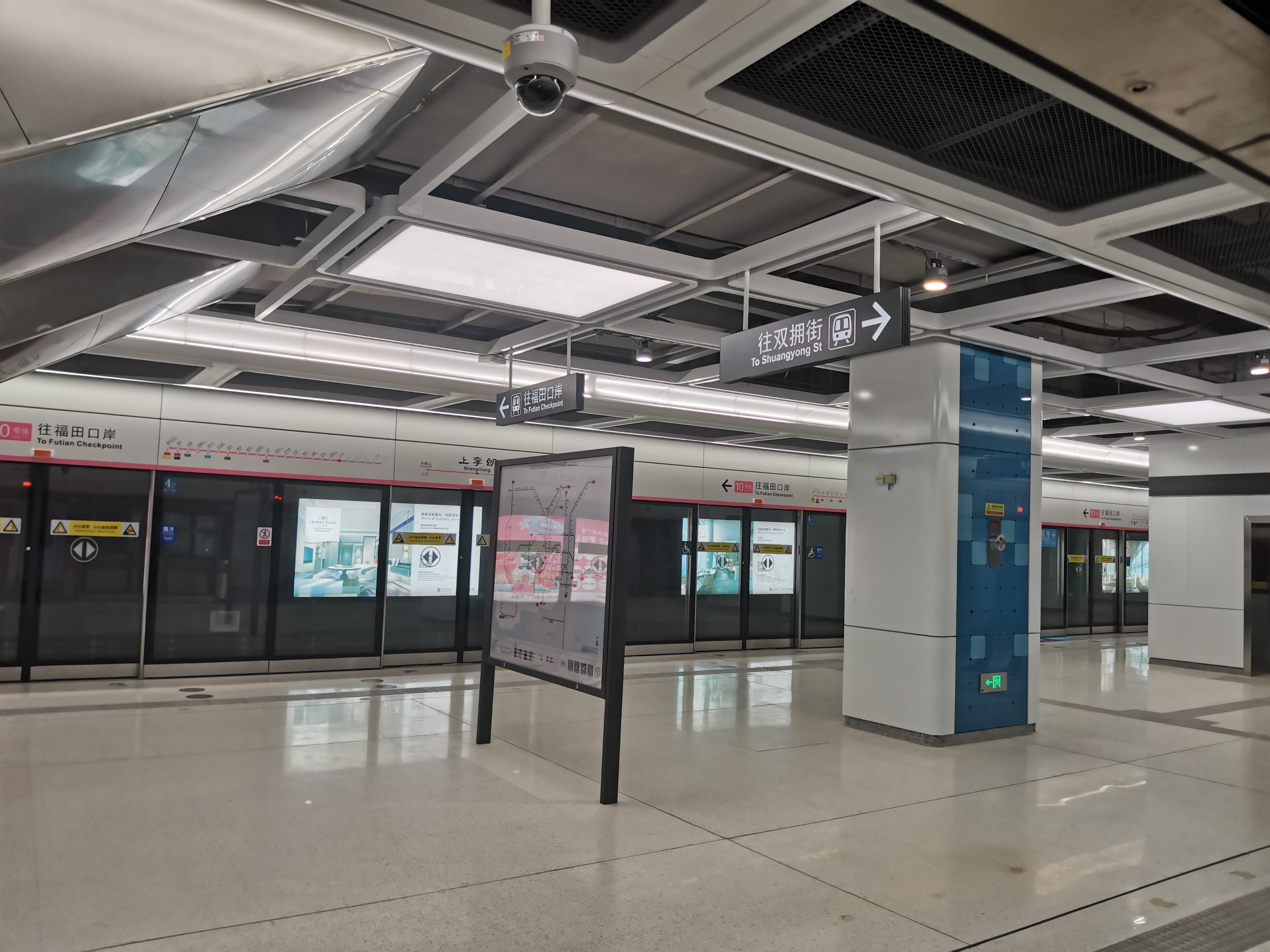

General information
- Location: Longgang District, Shenzhen, Guangdong; China
- Operated by: SZMC (Shenzhen Metro Group)
- Line: Line 10
- Platforms: 2 (1 island platform)
- Tracks: 2

Construction
- Structure type: Underground
- Accessible: Yes

History
- Opened: 18 August 2020

Services
Preceding station	Shenzhen Metro	Following station
Mugu towards Shuangyong Street	Line 10	Liangmao Hill towards Futian Checkpoint
Location

Shanglilang station (Chinese: 上李朗站; pinyin: Shànglǐlǎng Zhàn) is a station on Line 10 of the Shenzhen Metro. It opened on August 18, 2020.

== Station layout ==
G	-	Exit
B1F; Concourse	Lobby	Customer Service, Shops, Vending machines, ATMs
B2F; Platforms	Platform	← Line 10 towards Futian Checkpoint (Liangmao Hill)
B2F; Platforms	Island platform, doors will open on the left
B2F; Platforms	Platform	→ Line 10 towards Shuangyong Street (Mugu) →

== Exits ==
Exit	Destination
Exit A	Kangli City, Jinjijia Industrial Park, World Food City, Vienna Hotel
Exit B	Shanglilang Technology Park, Shanglilang Industrial Park
Exit C	Laoyucun Building, Xialilang Community
