= List of public transport routes numbered 17 =

In public transport, Route 17 may refer to:

- Route 17 (MTA Maryland), a bus route in Baltimore, Maryland and its suburbs
- Route 17 (MBTA), a bus route in Boston
- London Buses route 17

== See also ==
- Line 17 (disambiguation)
