= Baigelong station =

Metro station in Shenzhen, Guangdong, China

Coordinates: 22°35′43″N 114°7′49″E

Baigelong 百鸽笼
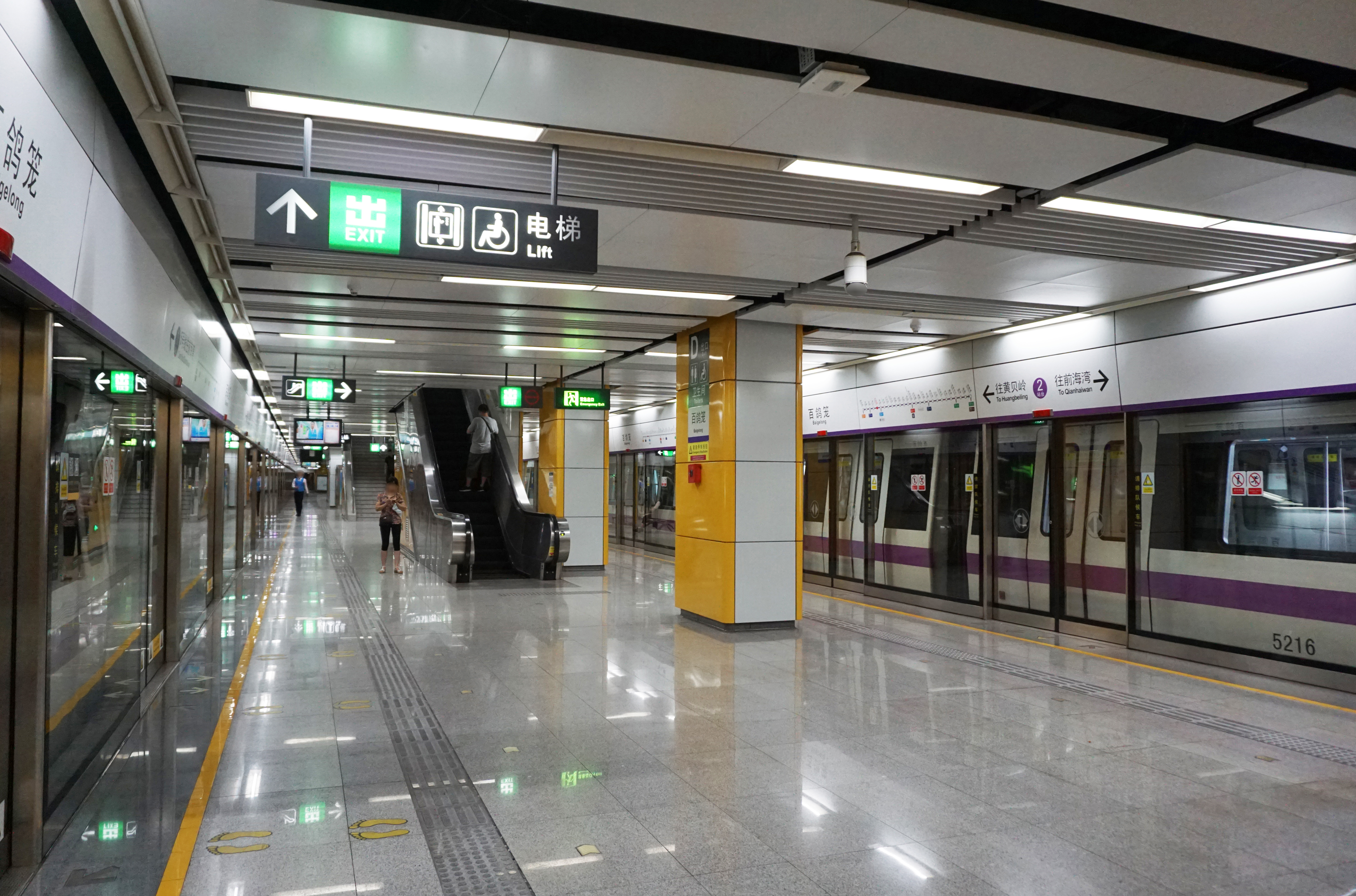
- Platforms (2017)

Chinese name
- Simplified Chinese: 百鸽笼
- Traditional Chinese: 百鴿籠
- Literal meaning: A Hundred Pigeon Cages
Transcriptions

General information
- Location: Buji Subdistrict, Longgang District, Shenzhen, Guangdong; China
- Operated by: SZMC (Shenzhen Metro Group)
- Line: Line 5

History
- Opened: 22 June 2011

Services
Preceding station	Shenzhen Metro	Following station
Buxin towards Grand Theater	Line 5	Buji towards Chiwan
Location

Baigelong station (Chinese: 百鸽笼站; pinyin: Bǎigēlóng Zhàn; Jyutping: baak^{3} gap^{3} lung^{4} zaam^{6}) is a metro station on Line 5 of the Shenzhen Metro. It opened on 22 June 2011.

== Station layout ==
G	Street level	Exit
B1F; Concourse	Lobby	Customer Service, Shops, Vending machines, ATMs
B2F; Platforms	Platform	← 5 towards Chiwan (Buji)
B2F; Platforms	Island platform, doors will open on the left, right
B2F; Platforms	Platform	← 5 towards Chiwan (Buji) → 5 towards Grand Theater (Buxin) →
B2F; Platforms	Platform	→ 5 towards Grand Theater (Buxin) →
B2F; Platforms	Side platform, doors will open on the right

== Exits ==
Exit	Destination
Exit A	Xiangge Road (W), Vanke Home, Huikang Road, Luogang Hospital
Exit B	Ronghua Road (S), Luogang Neighborhood Committee, Bus Station of Luogang Neighborhood Committee, Luogang Hospital, Xinyi Legend Mansion, Xinyi Lishan Park
Exit C	Chuangfu South Road (S), Bus, Shentebian Hi-tech Park, Kaisa Mocha Town, Keyuan School
Exit D	Xiangge Road (E), Huikang Road, Mumianwan Primary School
