= Gwangan station =

Station of the Busan Metro

209 광안 (박원욱병원) Gwangan (Park Won-wook Hospital)
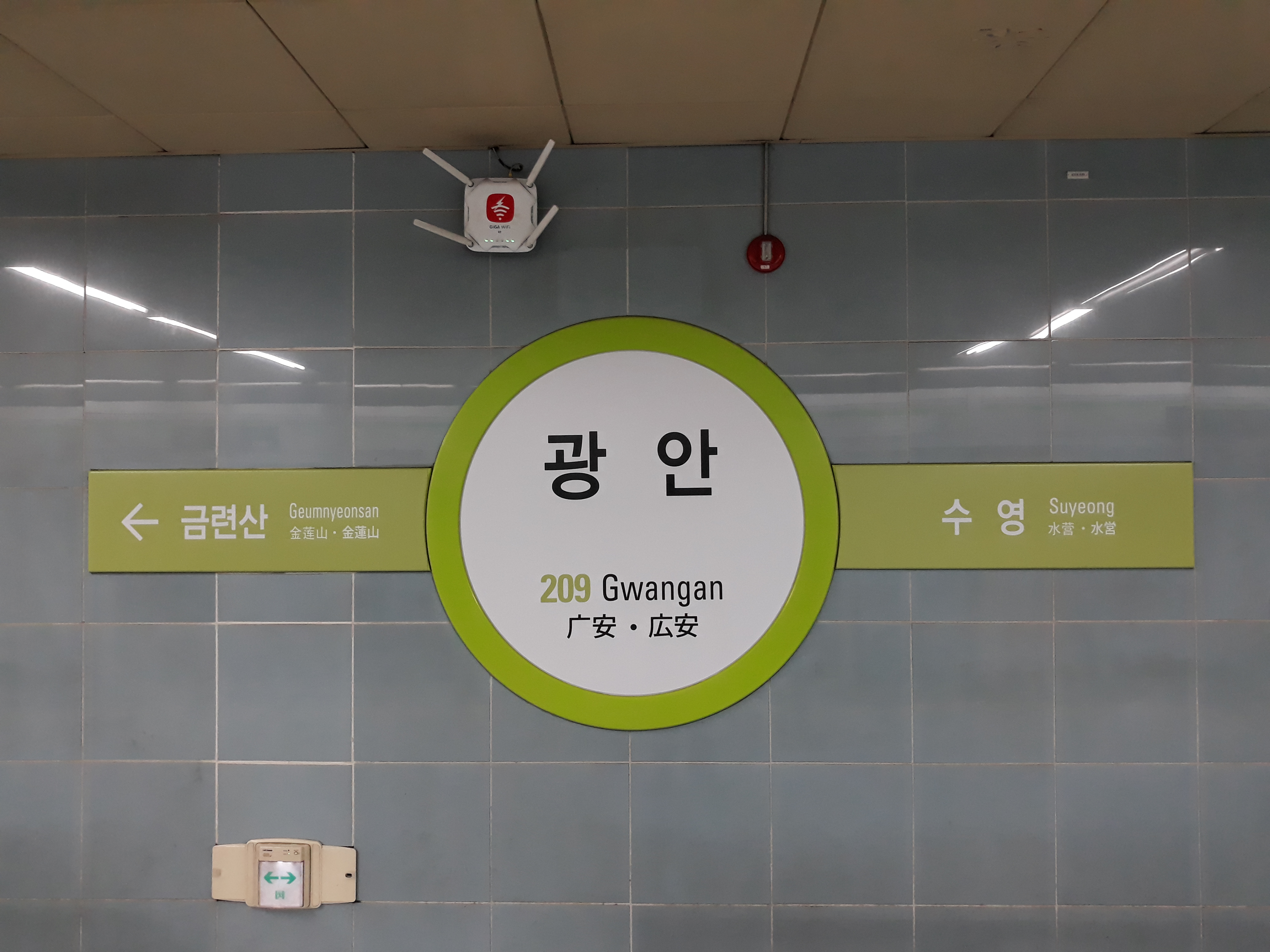

Korean name
- Hangul: 광안역
- Hanja: 廣安驛
- Revised Romanization: Gwangan-yeok
- McCune–Reischauer: Kwangan-yŏk

General information
- Location: Gwangan-dong, Suyeong District, Busan; South Korea
- Coordinates: 35°09′29″N 129°06′47″E
- Operator: Busan Transportation Corporation
- Line: Busan Metro Line 2
- Platforms: 2
- Tracks: 2

Construction
- Structure type: Underground

Other information
- Station code: 209

History
- Opened: January 16, 2002; 24 years ago
Location

Gwangan Station (Korean: 광안역) is a station on the Busan Metro Line 2 in Gwangan-dong, Suyeong District, Busan, South Korea.

Preceding station	Busan Metro	Following station
Suyeong towards Jangsan	Line 2	Geumnyeonsan towards Yangsan
