= Geumnyeonsan station =

Station of the Busan Metro

210 금련산 Geumnyeonsan
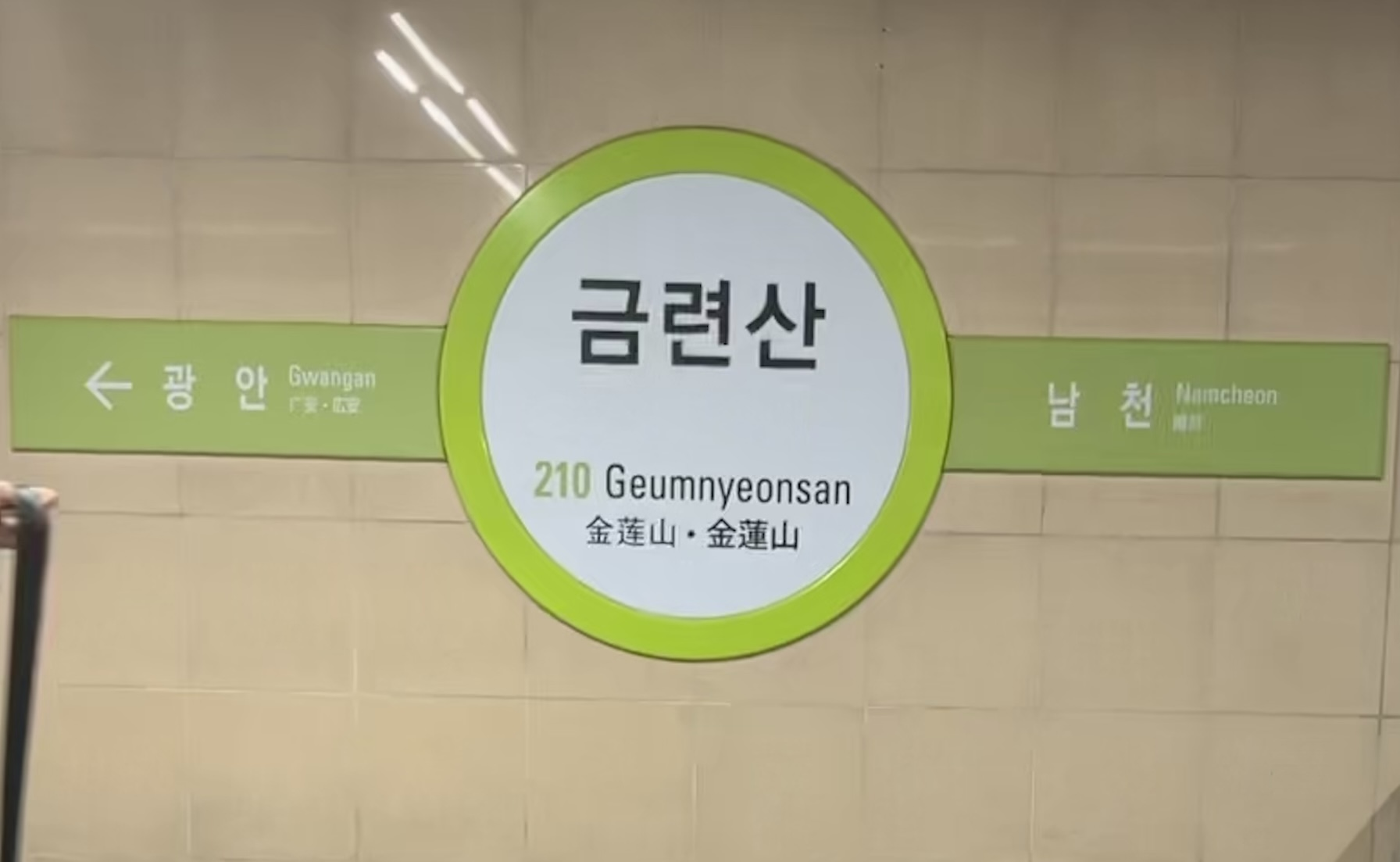

Korean name
- Hangul: 금련산역
- Hanja: 金蓮山驛
- Revised Romanization: Geumnyeonsan-yeok
- McCune–Reischauer: Kŭmnyŏnsan-yŏk

General information
- Location: Namcheon-dong, Suyeong District, Busan; South Korea
- Coordinates: 35.1499°N 129.1110°E
- Operator: Busan Transportation Corporation
- Line: Busan Metro Line 2
- Platforms: 2
- Tracks: 2

Construction
- Structure type: Underground

Other information
- Station code: 210

History
- Opened: August 8, 2001; 25 years ago
Location

Geumnyeonsan Station (Korean: 금련산역) is a station on the Busan Metro Line 2 in Namcheon-dong, Suyeong District, Busan, South Korea.

Preceding station	Busan Metro	Following station
Gwangan towards Jangsan	Line 2	Namcheon towards Yangsan
