= Seomyeon station =

Station of the Busan Metro in Busan, South Korea

119 219 서면 (청맥병원) Seomyeon (Cheongmaek Hospital)
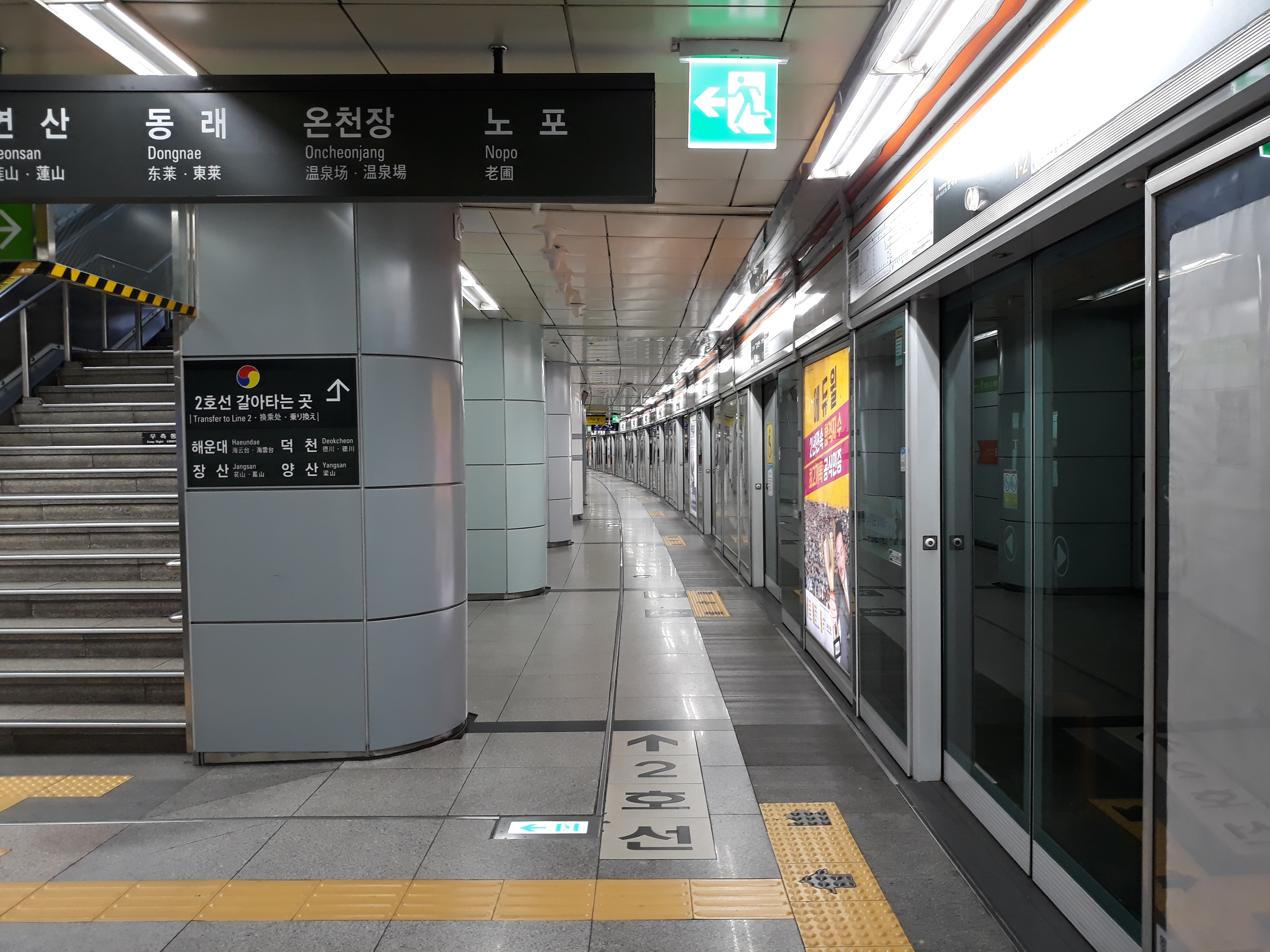

Korean name
- Hangul: 서면역
- Hanja: 西面驛
- Revised Romanization: Seomyeonnyeok
- McCune–Reischauer: Sŏmyŏnnyŏk

General information
- Location: Bujeon-dong, Busanjin District, Busan; South Korea
- Coordinates: 35°09′28″N 129°03′33″E
- Operator: Busan Transportation Corporation
- Lines: Line 1 Line 2
- Platforms: Line 1: 2; Line 2: 1
- Tracks: Line 1: 2; Line 2: 2

Construction
- Structure type: Underground
- Accessible: yes

Other information
- Station code: Line 1: 119; Line 2: 219

History
- Opened: Line 1: July 19, 1985; 41 years ago; Line 2: June 30, 1999; 27 years ago

Services
Preceding station	Busan Metro	Following station
Beomnaegol towards Dadaepo Beach	Line 1	Bujeon towards Nopo
Jeonpo towards Jangsan	Line 2	Buam towards Yangsan
Location

Seomyeon Station is a station on the Busan Metro Line 1 and Line 2 located in Bujeon-dong, Busanjin District, Busan.

The station is connected underground to the main Busan branch of Lotte Department Store, Judies Taehwa, Daehyun Primall, and the Seomyeon Underground Shopping Center.

Between 2010 and 2014, Seomyeon station recorded 28 platform-train gap related accidents—the second highest number of such incidents in South Korea behind Dongdaemun History & Culture Park Station in Seoul, and the highest in Busan.

== Station Layout ==
=== Line 1 ===
Bujeon ↑
S/B | | N/B
↓ Beomnaegol

Southbound	← ● Line 1 toward Dadaepo Beach
Northbound	→ ● Line 1 toward Nopo

=== Line 2 ===
Buam ↑
S/B | | N/B
↓ Jeonpo

Southbound	← ● Line 2 toward Jangsan
Northbound	→ ● Line 2 toward Yangsan

== See also ==
- Seomyeon, Busan

== Gallery ==
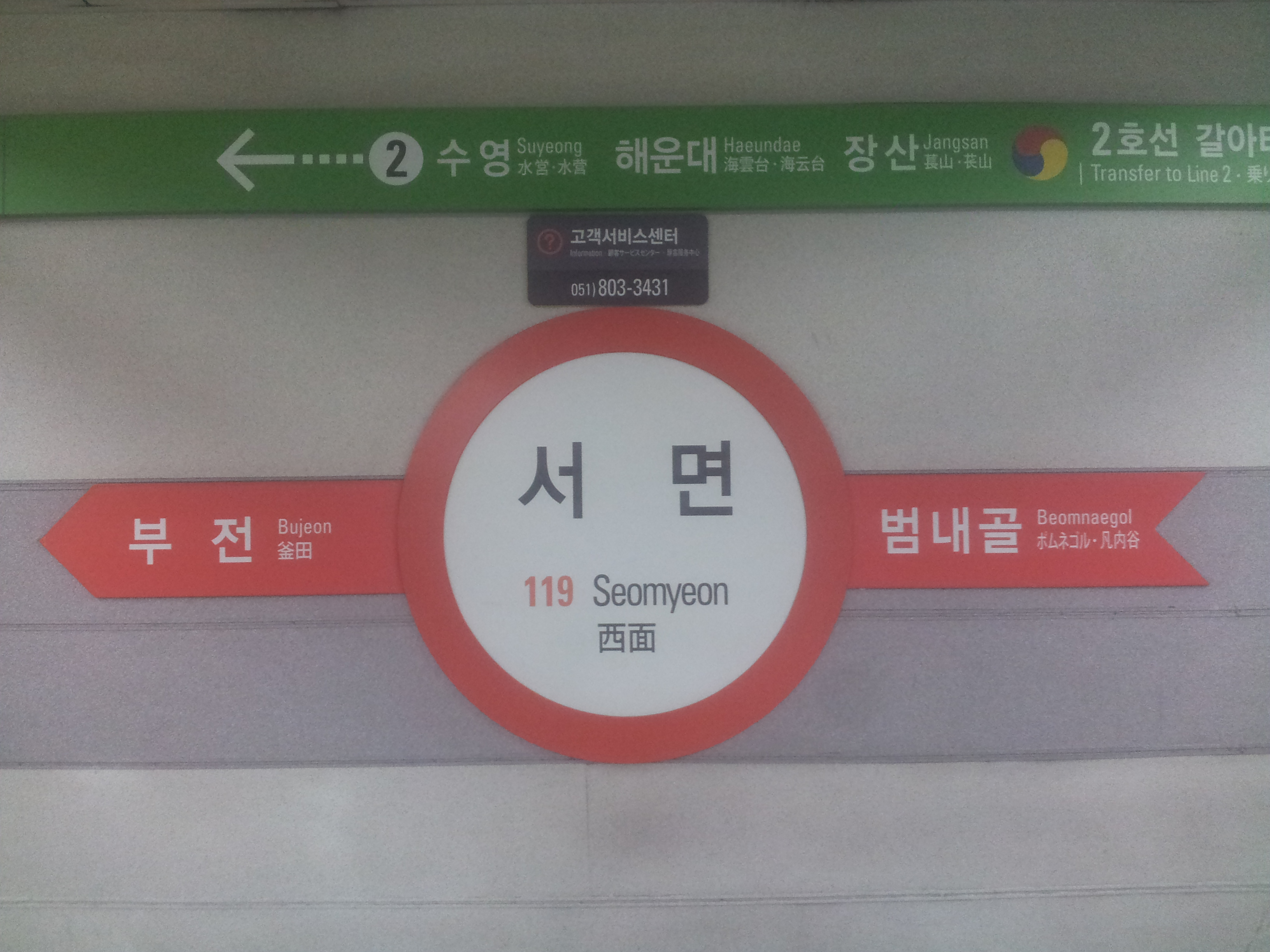
Station Sign (Line 1)

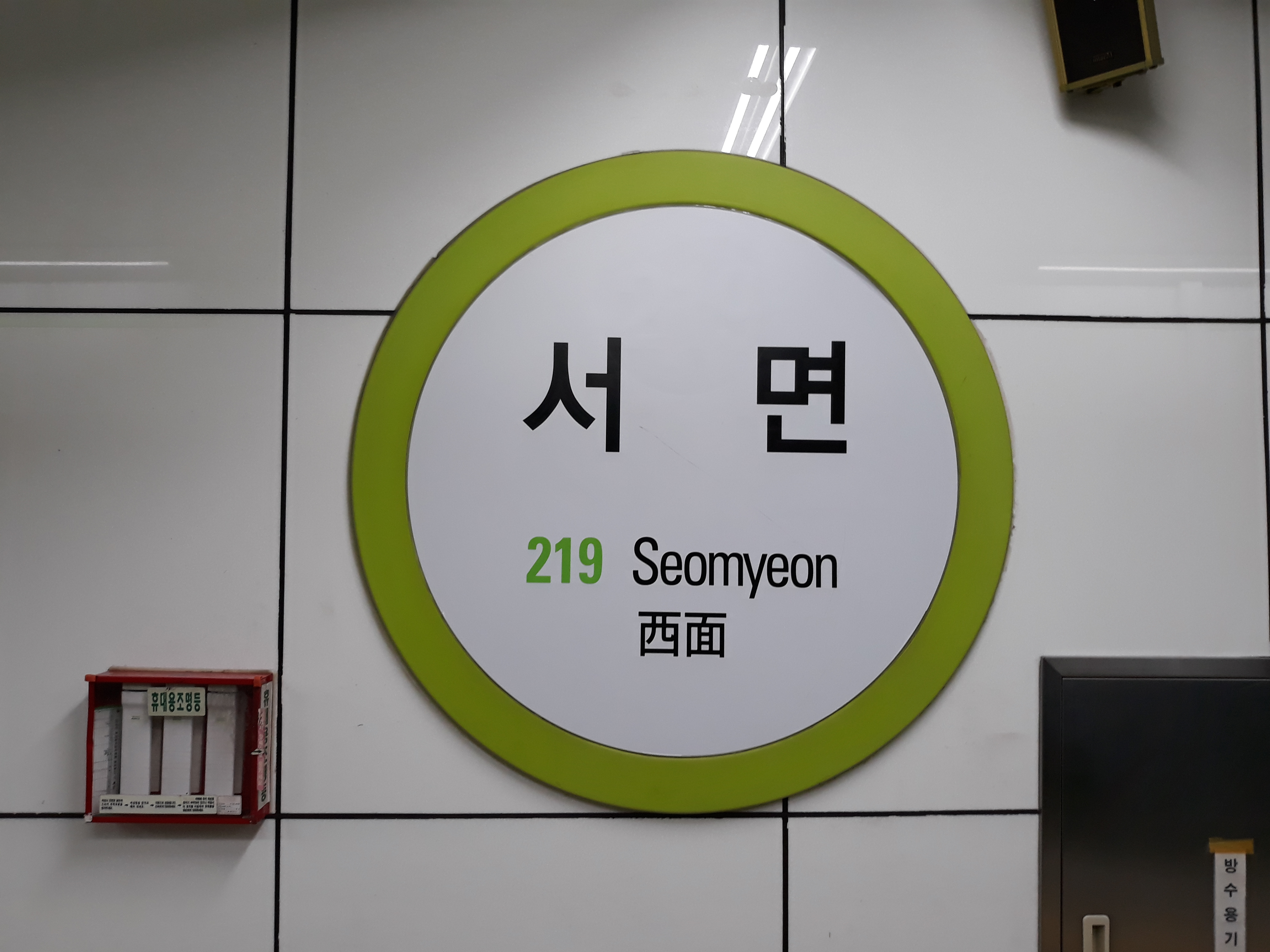
Station Sign (Line 2)
