= Jeonpo station =

Station of the Busan Metro

218 전포 Jeonpo
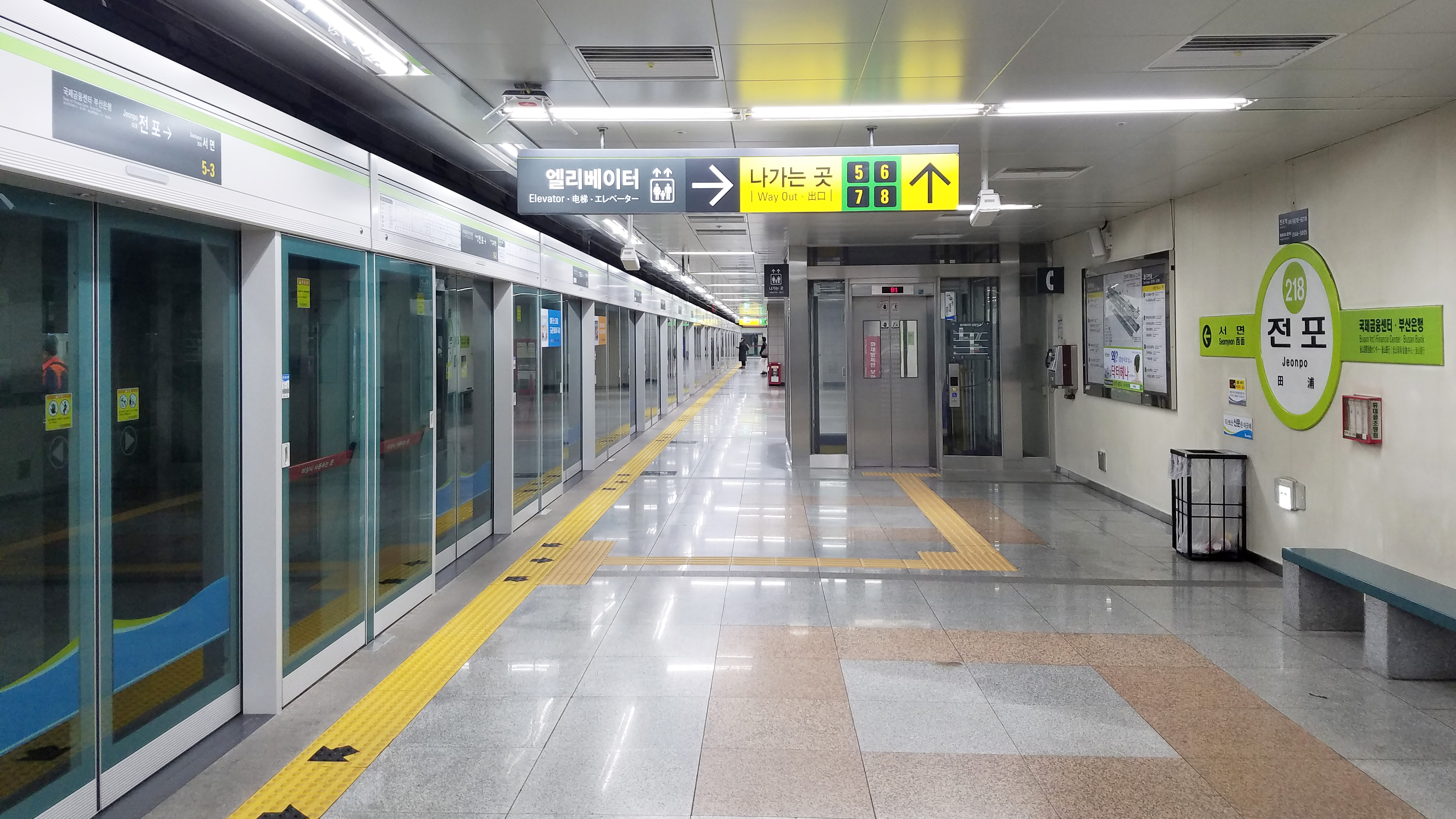

Korean name
- Hangul: 전포역
- Hanja: 田浦驛
- Revised Romanization: Jeonpo yeok
- McCune–Reischauer: Chŏnp'n yŏk

General information
- Location: Jeonpo-dong, Busanjin District, Busan; South Korea
- Coordinates: 35.1528°N 129.0654°E
- Operator: Busan Transportation Corporation
- Line: Busan Metro Line 2
- Platforms: 2
- Tracks: 2

Construction
- Structure type: Underground

Other information
- Station code: 218

History
- Opened: August 8, 2001; 25 years ago
Location

Jeonpo Station (Korean: 전포역) is a station on the Busan Metro Line 2 in Jeonpo-dong, Busanjin District, Busan, South Korea.

Preceding station	Busan Metro	Following station
Busan International Finance Center–Busan Bank towards Jangsan	Line 2	Seomyeon towards Yangsan
