= Busan International Finance Center–Busan Bank station =

Station of the Busan Metro

217 국제금융센터·부산은행 (연세미래IFC의원 부설검진센터) Busan Int'l Finance Center·Busan Bank (Yonsei Mirae IFC Clinic Affiliated Health Screening Center)
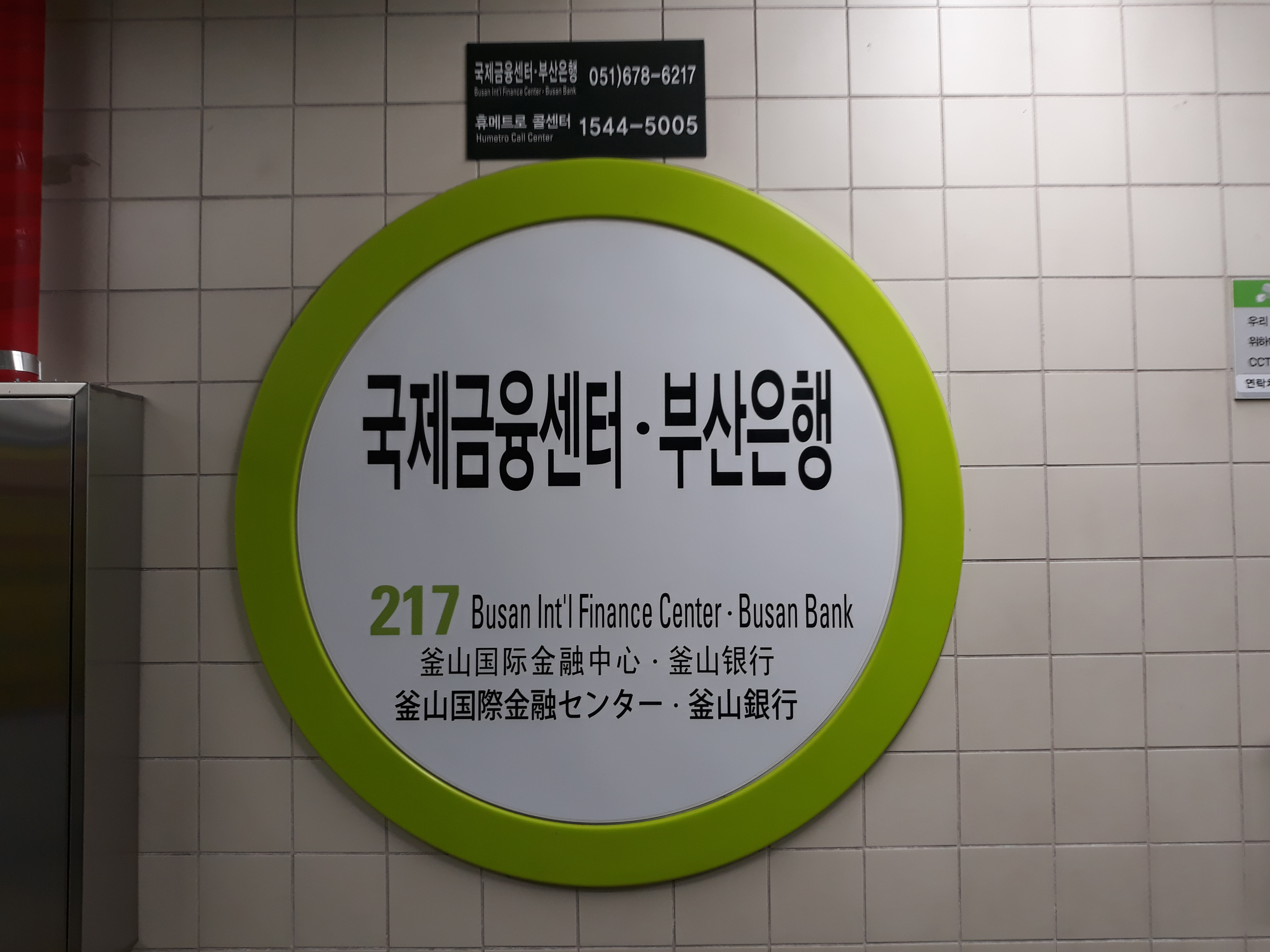

Korean name
- Hangul: 국제금융센터·부산은행역
- Hanja: 國際金融센터·釜山銀行驛
- Revised Romanization: Gukjegeumnyung Senteo · Busan Eunhaeng-yeok
- McCune–Reischauer: Kukchekŭmnyung Sent'ŏ · Pusan Ŭnhaeng-yŏk

General information
- Location: Munhyeon-dong, Nam District, Busan; South Korea
- Coordinates: 35.1457°N 129.0667°E
- Operator: Busan Transportation Corporation
- Line: Busan Metro Line 2
- Platforms: 1
- Tracks: 2

Construction
- Structure type: Underground

Other information
- Station code: 217

History
- Opened: August 8, 2001; 25 years ago
- Former names: Munjeon
Location

Busan International Finance Center·Busan Bank Station (Korean: 국제금융센터·부산은행역; Hanja: 國際金融센터·釜山銀行驛) is a station on the Busan Metro Line 2 in Munhyeon-dong, Nam District, Busan, South Korea. As its name suggests, Busan International Finance Center is located right next to the station. Prior to November 4, 2014, the station was named "Munjeon Station."

Preceding station	Busan Metro	Following station
Munhyeon towards Jangsan	Line 2	Jeonpo towards Yangsan
