= Pusan National University Yangsan Campus station =

Station of the Busan Metro

241 부산대양산캠퍼스 (증산마을) Pusan Nat'l Univ. Yangsan Campus (Jangsan Village)
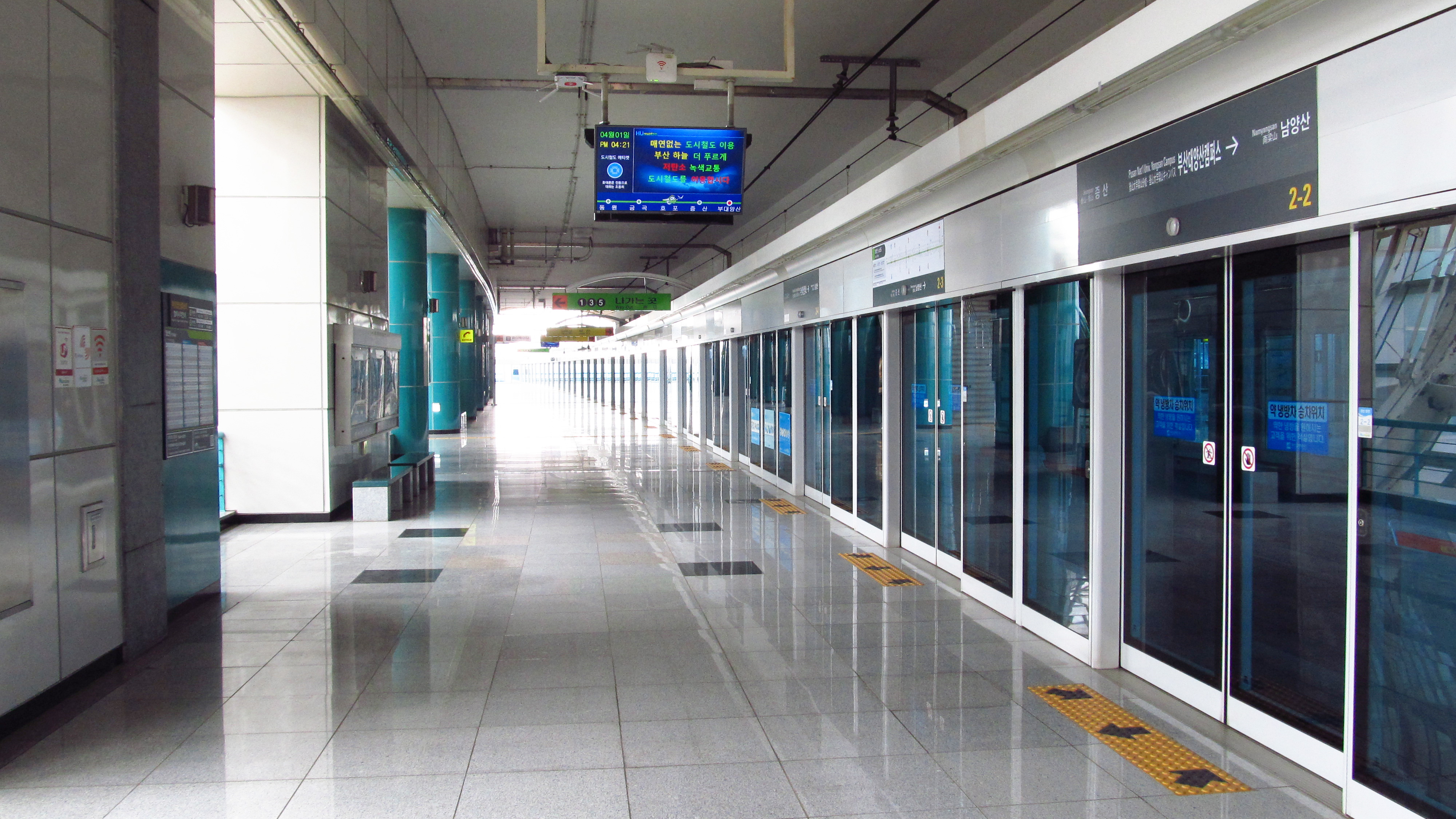

Korean name
- Hangul: 부산대양산캠퍼스역
- Hanja: 釜山大梁山캠퍼스驛
- Revised Romanization: Busandae Yangsan Kaempeosu yeok
- McCune–Reischauer: Pusandae Yangsan K'aemp'ŏsŭ yŏk

General information
- Location: Mulgeum-eup, Yangsan, South Gyeongsang; South Korea
- Operator: Busan Transportation Corporation
- Line: Busan Metro Line 2
- Platforms: 2
- Tracks: 2

Construction
- Structure type: Elevated

Other information
- Station code: 241

History
- Opened: October 1, 2009; 17 years ago
Location

Pusan National University Yangsan Campus Station (Korean: 부산대양산캠퍼스역; Hanja: 釜山大梁山캠퍼스驛) is a station on the Busan Metro Line 2 in Mulgeum-eup, Yangsan, South Gyeongsang, South Korea.

== History ==
Its name was originally Yangsan Pusan National University Hospital, but it was changed as of January 10, 2009. Trains previously didn't stop at the station from January 10, 2008, until it was opened on October 1, 2009.

== Nearby places ==
A shuttle bus connects the station to Yangsan Pusan National University Hospital.

- Yangsan Busan National University Hospital
- Busan National University Dental Hospital
- Busan Institute of Scientific Investigation

Preceding station	Busan Metro	Following station
Jeungsan towards Jangsan	Line 2	Namyangsan towards Yangsan
