= 田浦駅 =

田浦駅 or 田浦驛 may refer to:

- Jeonpo station
- Taura Station
