= Lee Ji-moon =

Korean soldier and whistleblower

Lee Ji-moon (李智文, born 1968) is a Korean soldier, whistleblower, civic activist and political scientist.

== Career ==
Lee Ji-moon (李智文) was born in yangsan, gyeongnam, in 1968. After attending Nangang High School, he graduated from the Department of Political Science and Diplomacy at Korea University in 1991 while serving as a Lieutenant in the 9th Division White Horse Troops during the ROTC 29th. The official requested the soldiers to shoot the candidate and accused the election of fraudulent Elections in that the public vote had been committed through a press conference (March 22, 1992). after being arrested and enduring three years of court quarrels, the dismissal was canceled, and Lee was able to move to lieutenant. However, after being hired by the Samsung Group, he decided to take a leave of absence during his military service and return to work after the war. This was rejected, and after the recommendation of reinstatement by the Democratization Committee, he was denied reinstatement and refused to return to the Samsung Group.

in the wake of Lee's revelation, absentee ballots in the military were improved to out-of-office voting, which began in the same year as Presidential Elections. Helping to Blocks Illegal Election,

Since then, Lee had been in a political affair for a While and has been elected as the Youngest Member of the Seoul Metropolitan Government. in a Democratic Party. Since the end of the city council, he has worked as an anti-corruption civil society activist at gatherings with the public interest reporter, the Whistle Foundation, the Heungsadan Transparent Social Movement Headquarters, and the Press Center for Human Rights, His only lottery democracy in Korea to elect members of parliament and local councils through lottery instead of elections. As of 2018. he is the general manager of the Korea Integrity Movement Headquarters, a permanent representative of the Internal Reporting Practice Movement, a research professor at Yonsei University, and a member of the government's Integrity Society and Public Relations Council. For his anti-corruption merit, he won the National Package, presidential commendation, and the citizen's award. Related to the Democratic Movement, he was recognized by the Honorary Recovery and Compensation Review Committee as a Democratic movement-related person. Through a series of anti-corruption campaigns after the whistle-blowing, Yonhap News and the trend newspapers introduced it as a symbol of anti-corruption.
