= Jeungsan station =

Jeungsan station (Korean: 증산역) is a railroad station in South Korea.

- Jeungsan station (Seoul)
- Jeungsan station (Busan Metro)
