= Seo-myeon, Busan =

Commerce center in Busanjin-gu, Busan, South Korea

Seo-myeon 서면
- Neighbourhood
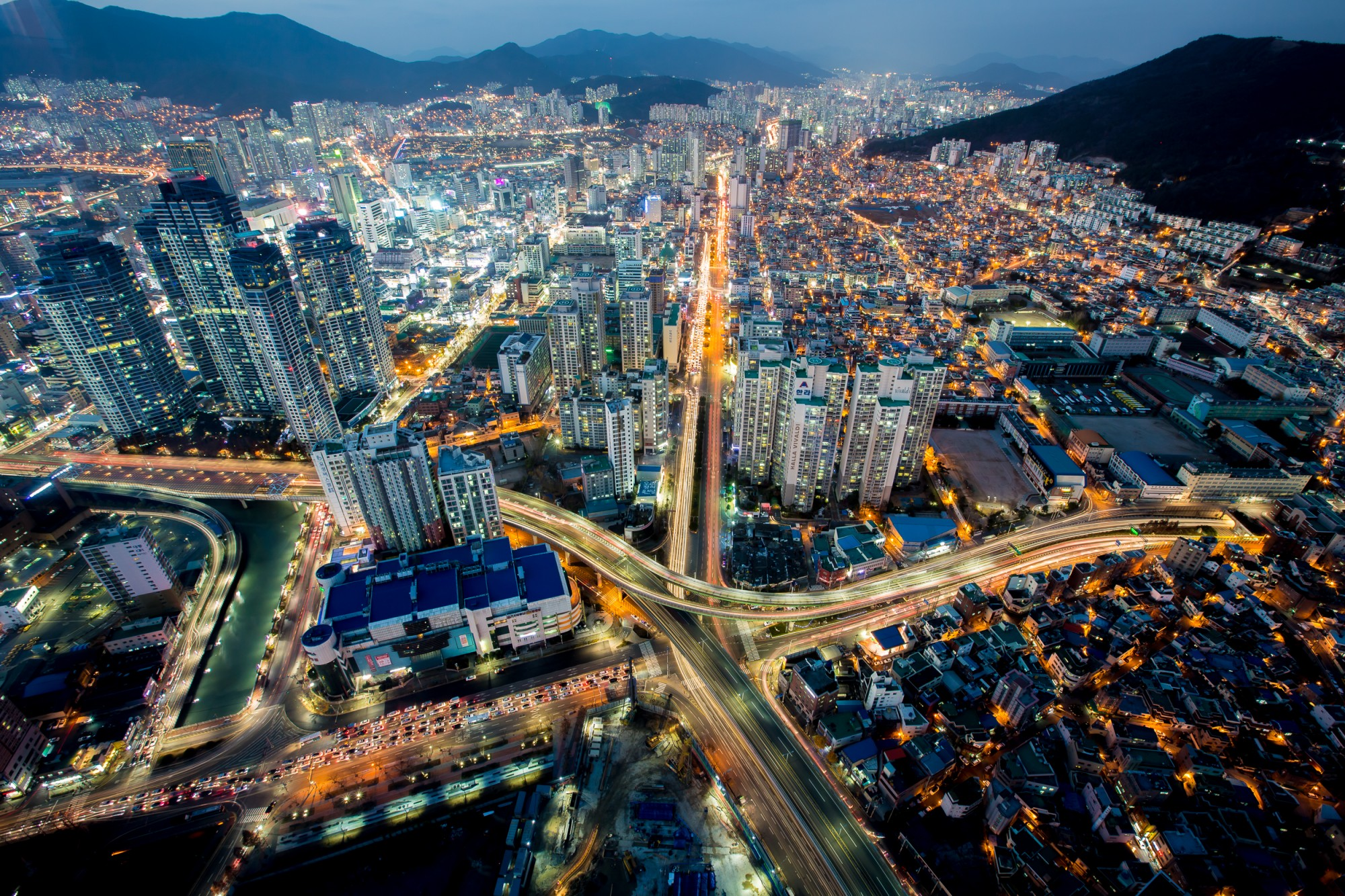
- The nightscape of Seo-myeon (2015)
- Interactive map of Seo-myeon
- Coordinates: 35.157°N 129.059°E
- Country: South Korea
- City: Busan
- District: Busanjin District

Seo-myeon (Korean: 서면; Hanja: 西面; lit. 'west side') is a major commercial center and transportation hub in Bujeon-dong, Busanjin District, Busan, South Korea.

The area grew from a small village in the Joseon period to a major industrial hub in the mid-20th century. It hosted numerous factories and businesses, including predecessors to the modern companies Samsung and LG. By the late 20th century, many of the factories moved away, and the area became the preeminent shopping and culture area of the city.

== Name ==
The official administrative name for this area is not "Seo-myeon"; it is actually "Bujeon-dong". "Seo-myeon" was the name of an old settlement in the area that has remained in use.

== Transportation ==
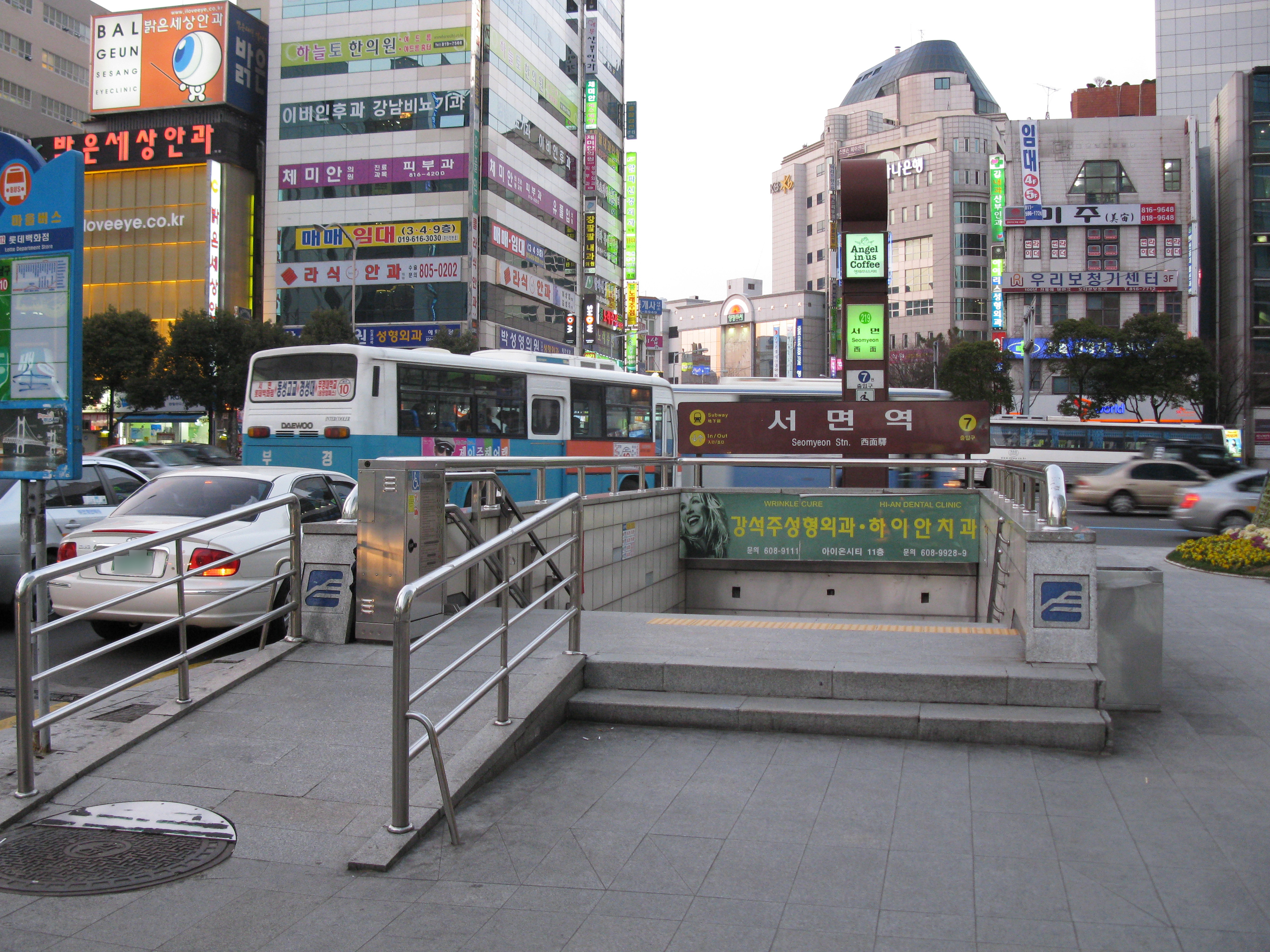
Seo-myeon Station exit 7

Seo-myeon is a transportation hub for public transportation in Busan. Seo-myeon Station is near the Seo-myeon road junction and is one of the busiest subway stations in Korea; it is the transfer station between Busan Subway Line 1 and Line 2. Bujeon Station near Bujeon Market is a train station on the Donghae Nambu Line and Bujeon Line.

A bus transfer center also lies in front of the Busan main store of the Lotte Department Store.

== History ==
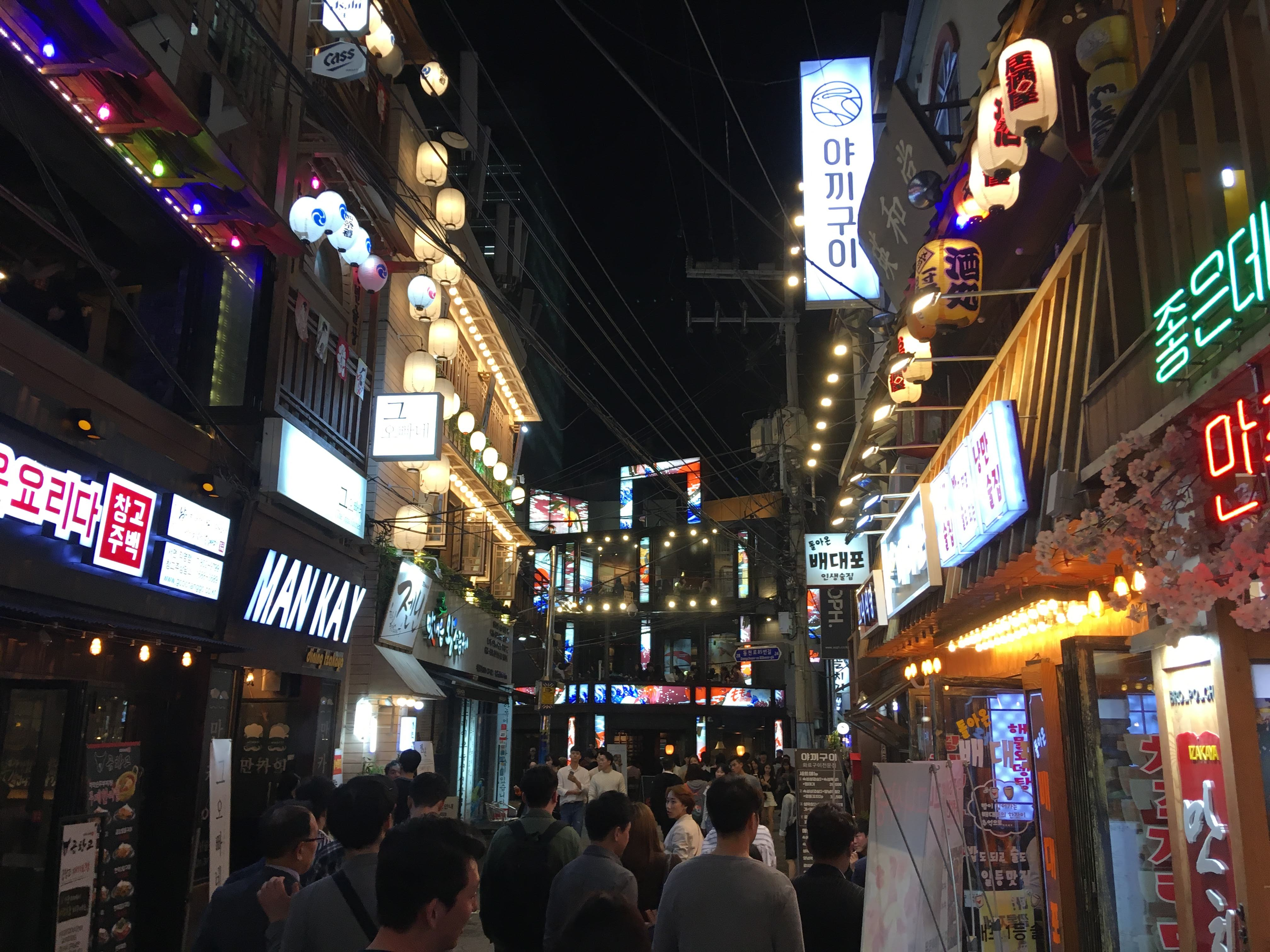
Restaurant street in Seo-myeon (2018)

The area was once a village to the west of the fortress Dongnaeeupseong. During the 1910–1945 Japanese colonial period, a tram was built from Yeongdo through the Dongnae Hot Springs area, which passed through Seo-myeon. After the 1945 liberation of Korea, factories were built around the area. In the 1950s, a number of factories were built in the area, including Cheil Jedang (a predecessor to the modern Samsung) and Lakhee Chemical (a predecessor to the modern LG).

The area's iconic 5-way intersection was built in 1957. Busan Tower was built in 1963. Trams passed under the tower until the tram closed in 1968. Industry in the area continued to flourish; this was due to the area's access to rail and proximity to the port of Busan. The area became especially busy in the 1970s, as workers commuted in large numbers to the area. It also became popular as an area for culture, and had theaters and shopping streets. It attracted both local workers and college students.

Beginning in the 1980s, factories were gradually moved to the outskirts of the city. The opening of shopping malls in the area during this decade cemented the area's status as a commercial hub. Banks and finance companies opened in the area, and government offices were located nearby. Hagwons increased in density in the 1990s.

== Symbology ==
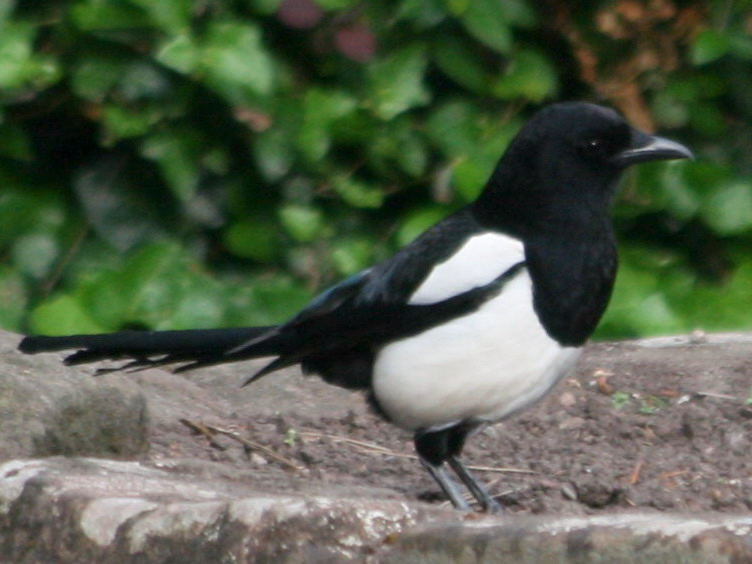
The magpie

The district flag of Busanjin-gu symbolizes the 5-way intersection of Seo-myeon. It represents the center of Busan as a hub of globalization, finance, commerce, distribution, and information. The district tree is the gingko, which can be seen throughout the area and is said to symbolize stability due to the resistant nature that protects it against disease and insects. The district flower is the chrysanthemum, another plant known to endure harsh conditions. The district bird is the magpie, known for building nests in the branches of very high trees.
