= Busan Metro Line 2 =

Subway line in Gyeongsangnam-do and Busan, South Korea

Line 2
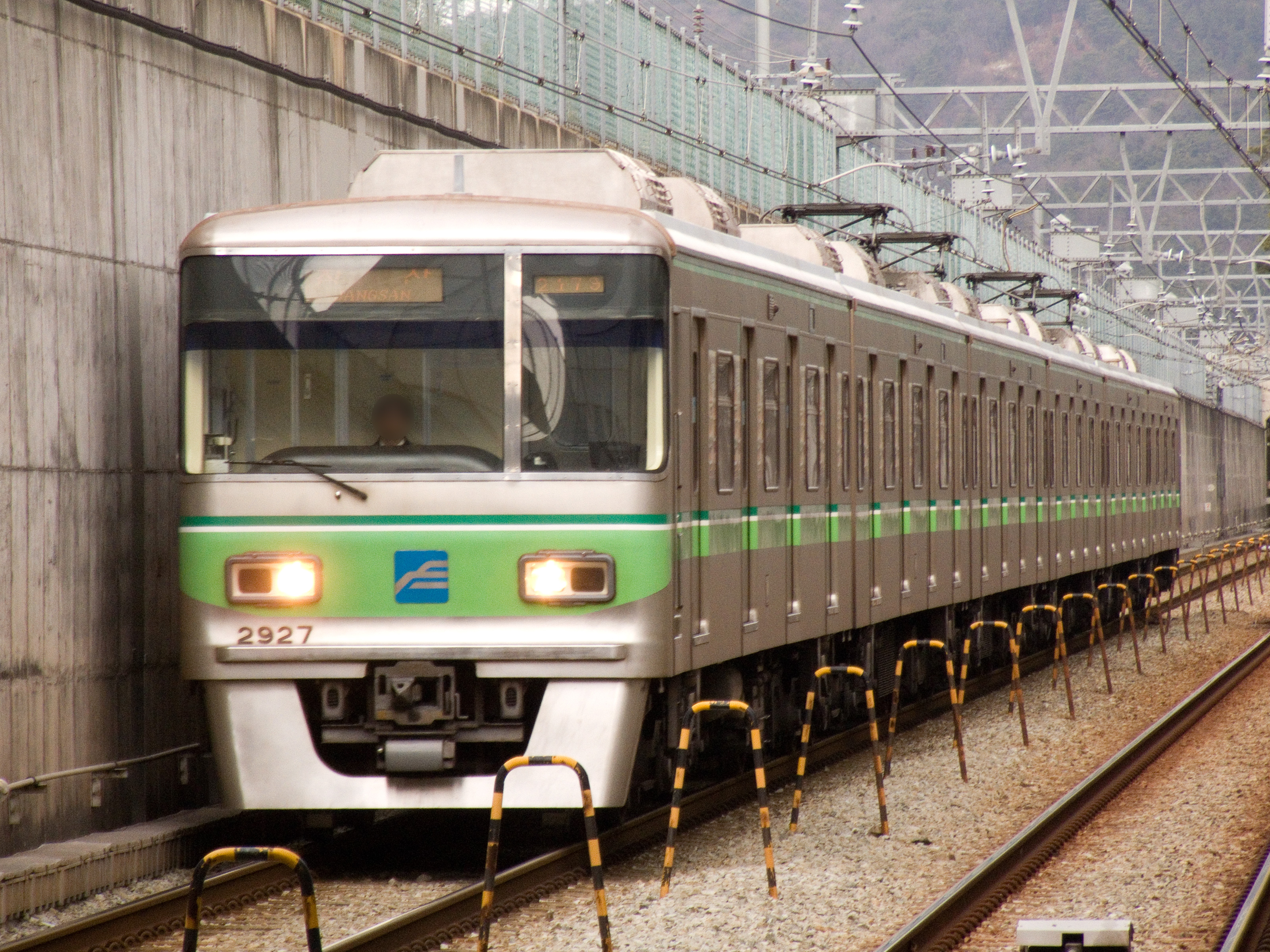

Overview
- Native name: 2호선(2號線); I Hoseon
- Status: Operational
- Termini: Jangsan or Jeonpo; Yangsan, Hopo or Gwangan Or Yangsan Sports Complex
- Stations: 59

Service
- Type: Rapid transit
- System: Busan Metro
- Services: 1
- Operator: Busan Transportation Corporation
- Rolling stock: Hanjin Heavy Industries BTC Class 2000

History
- Opened: 30 June 1999; 27 years ago
- Last extension: 2008

Technical
- Line length: 61.9 km (38.5 mi)
- Num of tracks: 2
- Track gauge: 1,435 mm (4 ft 8 1/2 in) standard gauge
- Electrification: Overhead tram line 1,500 V DC (Yangsan - Millak) & (Centum City - Jangsan) sections Overhead rigid body wire (T-Bar) 1,500 V DC (Millak - Centum City) section
- Operating speed: 80 km/h (50 mph)

Busan Metro Line 2 (2호선) is a line of the Busan Metro that crosses Busan, South Korea, from east to west, running along the shores of Haeundae and Gwanganli, and then north toward Yangsan. It is represented by a green colour. It has the highest ratio of subterranean stations to elevated stations, with only its last six (originally last two before Jeungsan, the Pusan National University Yangsan Campus station, Namyangsan, and Yangsan station were built and opened) being elevated and the first 37 being subterranean. The line is 45.6 km (28.3 mi) long with 44 stations, and its trains have six cars each.

Line 2's station signs have lime-green frames, using the same design as Line 1's station signs for the inner walls. On the outer walls, the signs have two arms sprouting from their sides, but have the same round face with the Hangul name of the station printed in big font and the English and Hanja names printed beneath in descending order in small font with the station number beside the English name. The arms have the names of the neighboring stations (in the aforementioned three fonts) and their ends are flat. Because the trains drive on the right side, the left arm of each sign has the next station appropriate to the train on the same side and the right arm has the previous station. Additionally, an arrow can be seen on the left arm pointing in the direction of the next station. Line 2 is the first line through the line to have station signs that have arms on the outer walls, although Line 1 will receive station signs with arms in certain stations such as Seomyeon.

A ride through the entire line takes about 1 hour 24 minutes. Busan Metro Line 2 will be expanded from Jangsan Station to East Busan Tourism Complex in Gijang County which will be opened in 2021. (Currently Planned)

== History ==
Plans to create the line began in 1987 and were finalized by 1991. During the construction of the third section of the line in 2001, the original plan to extend the route three stations beyond Yangsan Station was scrapped at the request of the citizens of Yangsan, with a new light rail line currently undergoing approval as an alternative.

An older plan hoped to stretch the line four stations beyond Jangsan Station, but was scrapped due to cost concerns. The extension idea has gained new interest, but with proposals for a new light rail line connecting Jangsan Station to the city of Ulsan.

=== 1990s ===
- November 28, 1991: Constructed the first section from Seomyeon Station (219) to Hopo Station (239).
- October 27, 1994: Constructed the second section from Jangsan Station (201) to Seomyeon Station (219).
- June 30, 1999: Commenced first section service from Seomyeon Station (219) to Hopo Station (239).

=== 2000s ===
- August 8, 2001: Commenced second section service from Geumnyeonsan Station (210) to Seomyeon Station (219).
- December 2001: Constructed the third section from Hopo Station (239) to Yangsan Station (243).
- January 16, 2002: Commenced second section service from Geumnyeonsan Station (210) to Gwangan Station (209).
- August 29, 2002: Commenced second section service from Jangsan Station (201) to Gwangan Station (209).
- January 10, 2008: Opened Namyangsan Station (242) and Yangsan Station (243).
- October 1, 2009: Opened Pusan National University Yangsan Campus Station (241).

=== 2010s ===
- November 4, 2014: Munjeon Station (217) renamed to Busan International Finance Center–Busan Bank Station.
- September 24, 2015: Opened Jeungsan Station (240).

== List of stations ==
Station Number	Station name English	Station name Hangul	Station name Hanja	Transfer	Distance in km	Total distance	Location	
201	Jangsan	장산 (해운대 백병원)	萇山		---	0.0	Busan	Haeundae
202	Jung-dong	중동	中洞		0.9	0.9	Busan	Haeundae
203	Haeundae	해운대	海雲臺		0.9	1.8	Busan	Haeundae
204	Dongbaek	동백	冬栢		1.2	3.0	Busan	Haeundae
205	BEXCO	벡스코	벡스코	Donghae Line	1.1	4.1	Busan	Haeundae
206	Centum City	센텀시티 (벡스코·신세계)	센텀시티		0.8	4.9	Busan	Haeundae
207	Millak	민락	民樂		1.0	5.9	Busan	Suyeong
208	Suyeong	수영	水營	Busan Metro Line 3	0.9	6.8	Busan	Suyeong
209	Gwangan	광안	廣安		0.9	7.7	Busan	Suyeong
210	Geumnyeonsan	금련산 (좋은강안병원)	金蓮山		0.9	8.6	Busan	Suyeong
211	Namcheon	남천 (KBS∙수영구청)	南川		0.9	9.5	Busan	Suyeong
212	Kyungsung Univ. · Pukyong Nat'l Univ.	경성대·부경대 (동명대학교)	慶星大·釜慶大		0.8	10.3	Busan	Nam
213	Daeyeon	대연 (고려병원)	大淵		0.9	11.2	Busan	Nam
214	Motgol	못골 (남구청)	池谷		0.7	11.9	Busan	Nam
215	Jigegol	지게골	支架谷		0.9	12.8	Busan	Nam
216	Munhyeon	문현	門峴		0.8	13.6	Busan	Nam
217	Busan International Finance Center·Busan Bank	국제금융센터·부산은행	國際金融센터·釜山銀行		0.8	14.4	Busan	Nam
218	Jeonpo	전포	田浦		0.8	15.2	Busan	Busanjin
219	Seomyeon	서면	西面	Busan Metro Line 1	1.1	16.3	Busan	Busanjin
220	Buam	부암 (온 종합병원)	釜岩		0.8	17.1	Busan	Busanjin
221	Gaya	가야	伽倻		0.7	17.8	Busan	Busanjin
222	Dongeui Univ.	동의대	東義大		0.9	18.7	Busan	Busanjin
223	Gaegeum	개금	開琴		1.1	19.8	Busan	Busanjin
224	Naengjeong	냉정	冷亭		0.8	20.6	Busan	Sasang
225	Jurye	주례	周礼		0.9	21.5	Busan	Sasang
226	Gamjeon	감전 (사상구청)	甘田		1.2	22.7	Busan	Sasang
227	Sasang	사상 (서부터미널)	沙上	Busan–Gimhae Light Rail Transit	1.1	23.8	Busan	Sasang
228	Deokpo	덕포	德浦		1.2	25.0	Busan	Sasang
229	Modeok	모덕	毛德		1.0	25.8	Busan	Sasang
230	Mora	모라	毛羅		1.0	26.8	Busan	Sasang
231	Gunam	구남	亀南		1.1	27.9	Busan	Buk
232	Gumyeong	구명	亀明		0.7	28.6	Busan	Buk
233	Deokcheon	덕천 (부산과기대)	德川	Busan Metro Line 3	1.2	29.8	Busan	Buk
234	Sujeong	수정 (방송통신대)	水亭		1.5	31.3	Busan	Buk
235	Hwamyeong	화명	華明		1.5	32.8	Busan	Buk
236	Yulli	율리	栗里		1.2	34.0	Busan	Buk
237	Dongwon	동원	東院		1.5	35.5	Busan	Buk
238	Geumgok	금곡	金谷		1.0	36.5	Busan	Buk
239	Hopo	호포	湖浦		1.5	38.0	South Gyeongsang	Yangsan
240	Jeungsan	증산	甑山		3.5	41.5	South Gyeongsang	Yangsan
241	Pusan Nat'l Univ. Yangsan Campus	부산대양산캠퍼스	釜山大梁山캠퍼스		1.0	42.5	South Gyeongsang	Yangsan
242	Namyangsan	남양산 (범어)	南梁山		1.1	43.6	South Gyeongsang	Yangsan
243	Yangsan	양산 (시청·양산대학)	梁山		1.6	45.2	South Gyeongsang	Yangsan
