= Jeungsan station (Busan Metro) =

Station of the Busan Metro

240 증산 Jeungsan
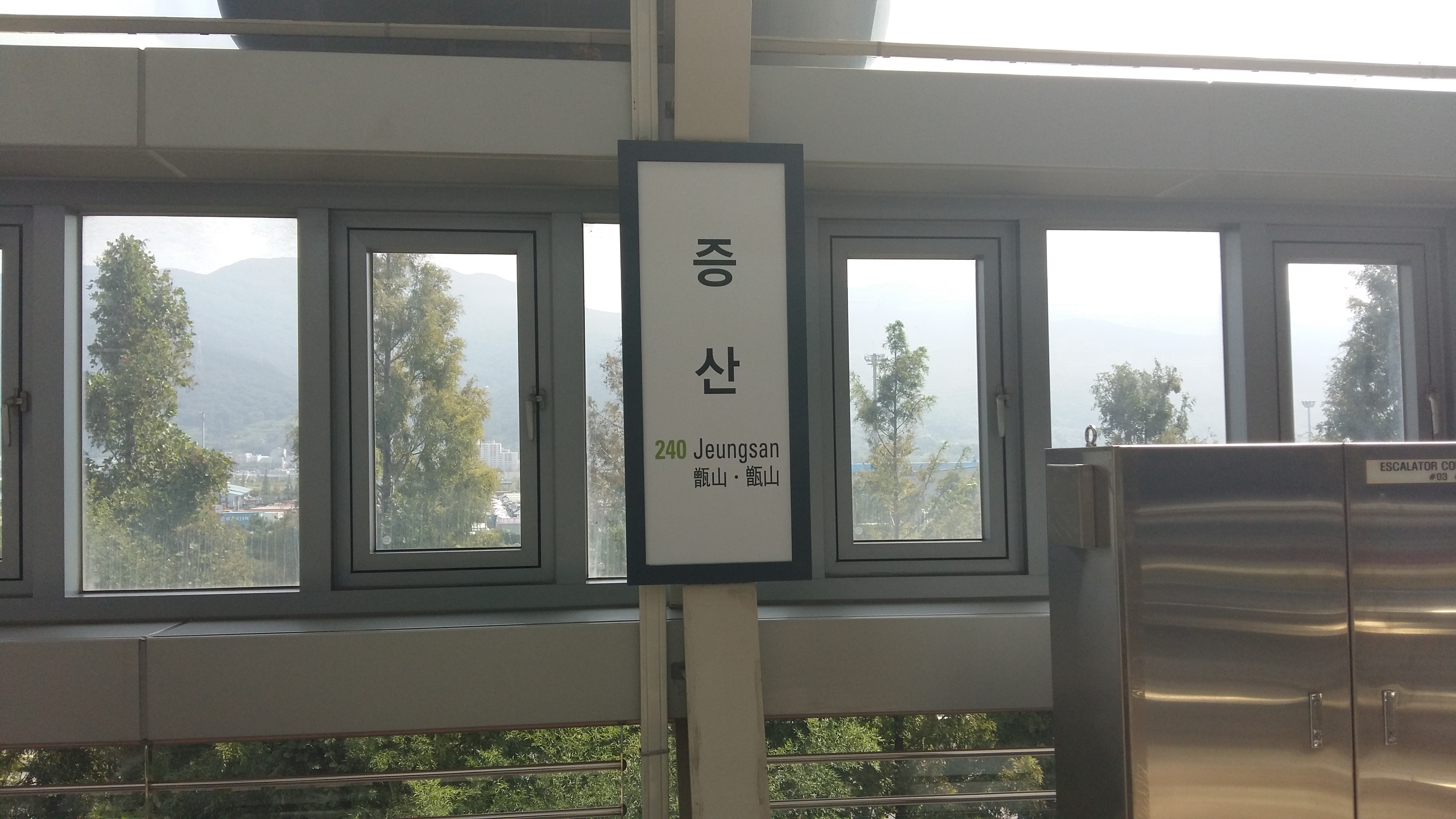

Korean name
- Hangul: 증산역
- Hanja: 甑山驛
- Revised Romanization: Jeungsan yeok
- McCune–Reischauer: Chŭngsan yŏk

General information
- Location: Mulgeum-eup, Yangsan, South Gyeongsang; South Korea
- Coordinates: 35°18′34″N 129°0′35″E
- Operator: Busan Transportation Corporation
- Line: Busan Metro Line 2
- Platforms: 2
- Tracks: 2

Construction
- Structure type: Elavated

Other information
- Station code: 240

History
- Opened: September 24, 2015; 11 years ago
Location

Jeungsan Station (Korean: 증산역) is a station on the Busan Metro Line 2 in Mulgeum-eup, Yangsan, South Gyeongsang, South Korea.

== Station periphery ==
- Jeungsan-ri
- Yangsan Daebang Nobland Third Session
- Yangsan Daebang Nobland Secondary Session
- Gachon-ri
- Lapiesta Yangsan

== History ==
Jan. 10, 2008: Operating as an uninterrupted transit station with the opening of Busan Metro Line 2

September 24, 2015: Start of business

Preceding station	Busan Metro	Following station
Hopo towards Jangsan	Line 2	Pusan National University Yangsan Campus towards Yangsan
