= Namyangsan station =

Station of the Busan Metro

242 남양산 (범어) Namyangsan (Beomeo)
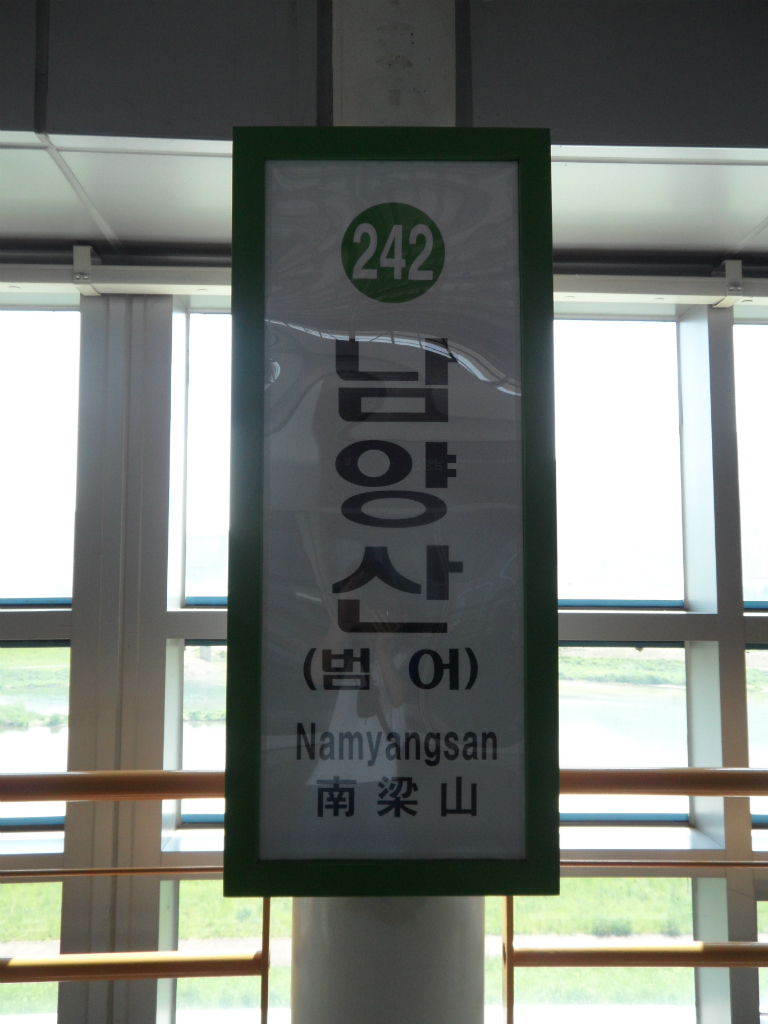

Korean name
- Hangul: 남양산역
- Hanja: 南梁山驛
- Revised Romanization: Namyangsan yeok
- McCune–Reischauer: Namyangsan yŏk

General information
- Location: Mulgeum-eup, Yangsan, South Gyeongsang; South Korea
- Coordinates: 35.3254°N 129.0194°E
- Operator: Busan Transportation Corporation
- Line: Busan Metro Line 2
- Platforms: 2
- Tracks: 2

Construction
- Structure type: Elevated

Other information
- Station code: 242

History
- Opened: January 10, 2008; 18 years ago
Location

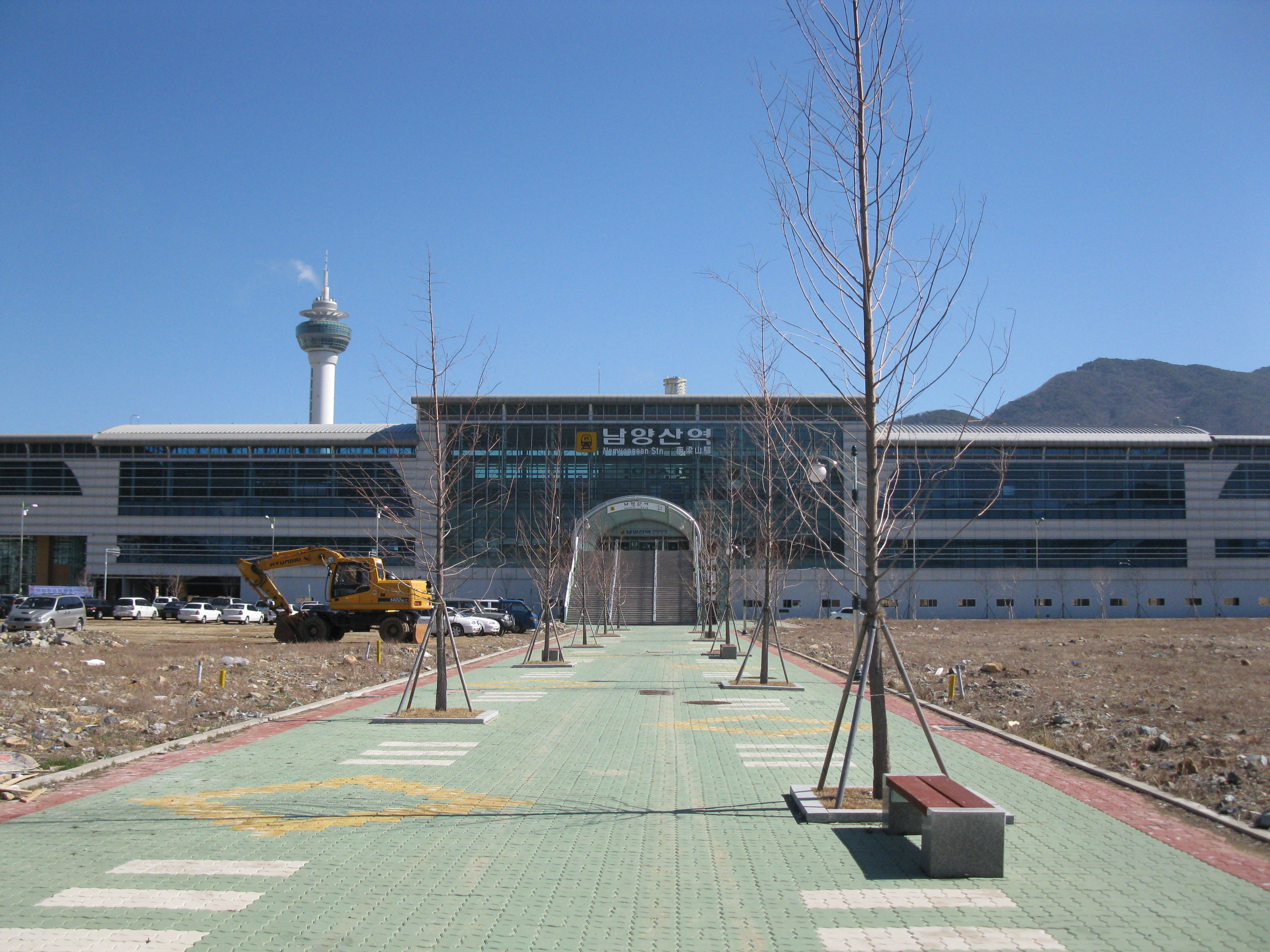
outside

Namyangsan Station (Korean: 남양산역; Hanja: 南梁山驛) is a station on the Busan Metro Line 2 in Mulgeum-eup, Yangsan, South Gyeongsang, South Korea. The station's name literally means "South Yangsan."

Preceding station	Busan Metro	Following station
Pusan National University Yangsan Campus towards Jangsan	Line 2	Yangsan Terminus
