= Song Sang-hyeon Square =

Plaza in Busan, South Korea

- Public square
- {{{other_names}}}
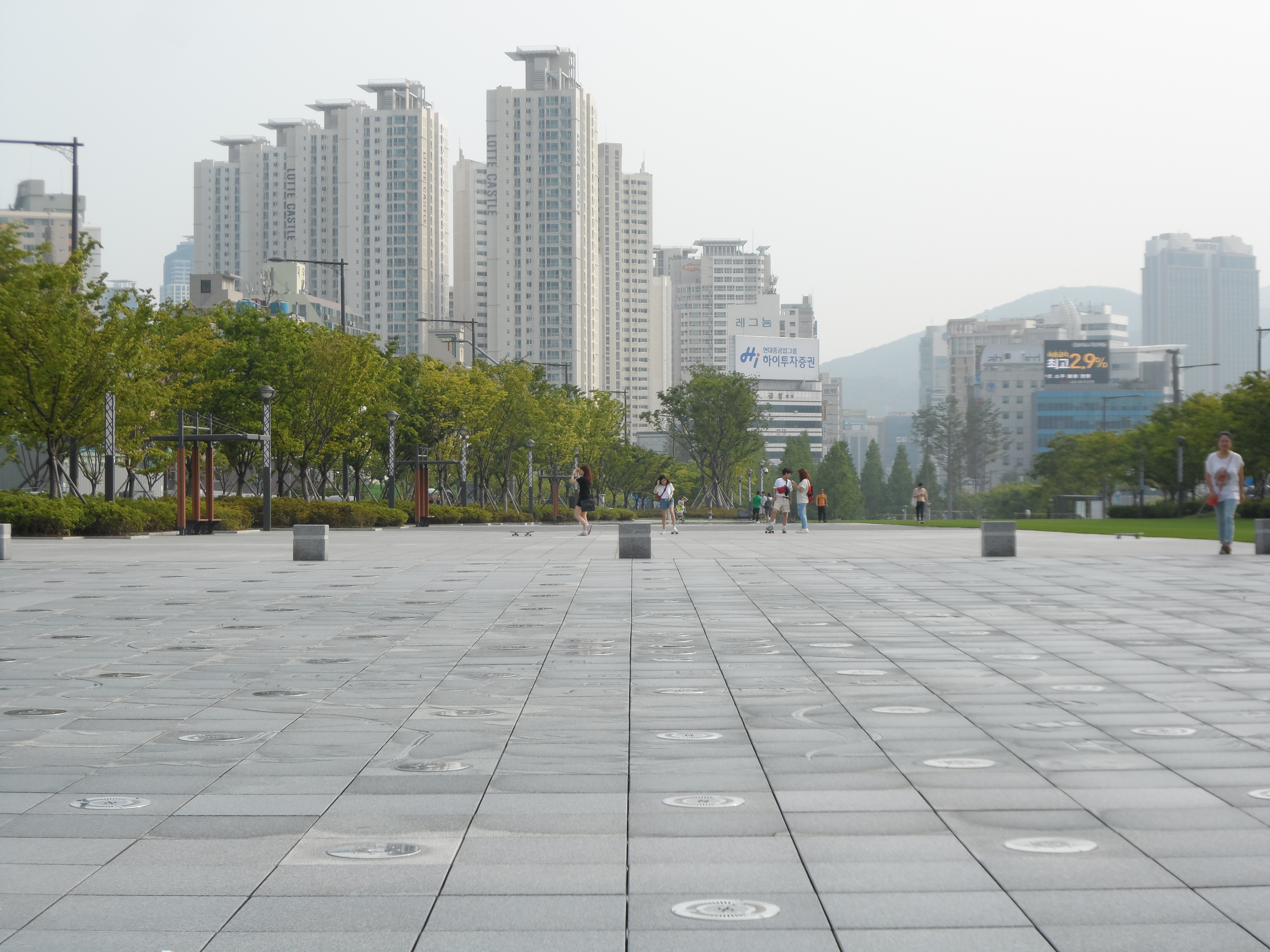
- Features: fountain, statues
- Opened: 2014
- Owner: Busan Metropolitan Government
- Location: Busanjin-gu; Busan, Republic of Korea
- Interactive map of Song Sang-hyeon Square
- Coordinates: 35°10′09″N 129°04′04″E

Song Sang-hyeon Square (Korean: 송상현 광장, also known as Song Sang-hyeon Plaza) is a public open space on Jungang-daero Avenue in Jeonpo-dong, Busanjin District, Busan, South Korea. It is South Korea's largest square. Building began in 2012; in October 2013, the construction site was expanded; in June 2014 construction was completed, and the area was officially opened on June 12 2014. In April 2012, a competition was announced on the choice of name for the area. In November 2012, the square was named after Song Sang-hyeon, the national war hero during the Japanese invasions of Korea against the Japanese.
