= Fortress site of Gyeongsang Jwasuyeong =

Archaeological site in Busan, South Korea

- Suyeong District, Busan, South Korea
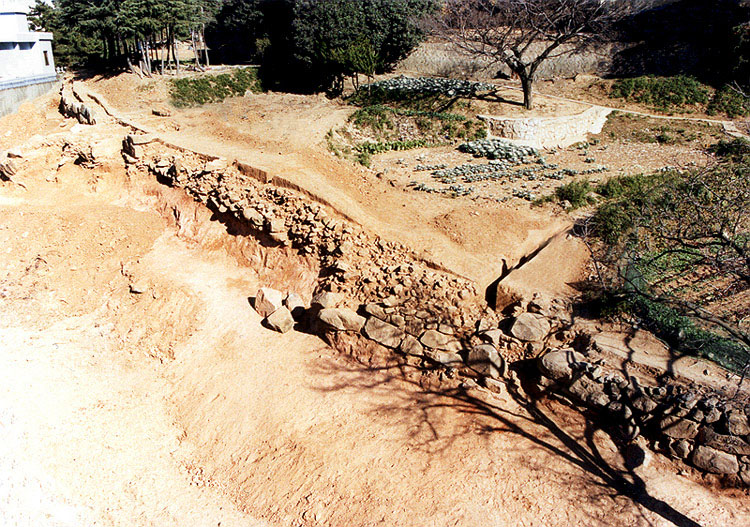

Site information
- Type: Korean castle
- Condition: Serves as historic site

Site history
- Built: Unidentified, rebuilt 1652
- Built by: Government of Joseon
- In use: 1652-1895
- Materials: stone, wood, plaster walls

- Fortress site of Gyeongsang Jwasuyeong
- Hangul: 경상좌수영성지
- Hanja: 慶尙左水營城址
- Revised Romanization: Jwasuyeongseongji
- McCune–Reischauer: Chwasuyŏngsŏngji

The Fortress site of Gyeongsang Jwasuyeong (Korean: 경상좌수영성지) is located in Suyeong-dong, Suyeong District, Busan, South Korea.

The Fortress site of Jwasuyeong is the site of the main fortress of the Gyeongsangjwado naval forces during the Joseon. At one time, seven naval ports with a total of 65 battle ships and 40 auxiliary vessels were under its command and charged with the defense of the east coast area.

The command post was first located at Busanpo, then relocated to Gaeunpo at Ulsan, and immediately before the Imjin War, was moved to this place. It was moved to Gammanipo during the reign of King Injo, and moved back here in 1652, the third year of the reign of King Hyojong. Thereafter, it remained at this site until the naval forces were disbanded as part of the broader reformation of the military system in 1895.

The time of the original construction of the wall-fortress here is not known, but the wall-fortress to which the existing remains belong seems to have been built after the relocation of the headquarters to this place in 1652. At that time, the wall-fortress was 2,784 meters in circumference and 4 meters in height. It had three wells, four gates, four drainage outlets, and several small bulwarks along the wall.

Most of the facilities have been ruined due to inadequate care during the Japanese colonial period (1910–45), and only parts of the wall, the arched south gate, and drain outlets remain.
