= Yangsan =

City in South Gyeongsang, South Korea

- Municipal City
- Panoramic view of Yangsan

- Flag Emblem of Yangsan

- Location in South Korea
- Coordinates: 35°20′N 129°02′E
- Country: South Korea
- Region: Yeongnam
- Administrative divisions: 1 eup, 4 myeon, 7 dong

Government
  - Mayor: Na Dong-yeon (People Power)

Area
  - Total: 484.52 km^{2} (187.07 sq mi)

Population (September 2024)
  - Total: 358,074
  - Density: 582.79/km^{2} (1,509.4/sq mi)
  - Dialect: Gyeongsang
- Website: www.yangsan.go.kr/en/main.do

Korean name
- Hangul: 양산시
- Hanja: 梁山市
- RR: Yangsan-si
- MR: Yangsan-si

Yangsan (Korean: 양산; Korean pronunciation: [jaŋ.san]) is a city in Gyeongsangnam-do Province, South Korea.

It borders Ulsan to the northeast, Gijang-gun and Geumjeong District in Busan to the southeast, Gimhae to the southwest, and Miryang to the northwest. City Hall is located in Nambu-dong, Yangsan.

== Administrative divisions ==
Currently, Yangsan is made up of 1 Eup (administrative division), 4 Myeon (administrative division) and 8 Dong.

Name	Hangul	Hanja	Subdivisions
Mulgeum-eup	물금읍	勿禁邑	4 ri
Dong-myeon	동면	東面	8 ri
Sangbuk-myeon	상북면	上北面	9 ri
Wondong-myeon	원동면	院東面	8 ri
Habuk-myeon	하북면	下北面	8 ri
Gangseo-dong	강서동	江西洞	3 dong
Deokgye-dong	덕계동	德溪洞	2 dong
Samseong-dong	삼성동	三城洞	4 dong
Seochang-dong	서창동	西倉洞	3 dong
Soju-dong	소주동	燒酒洞	3 dong
Jungang-dong	중앙동	中央洞	5 dong
Pyeongsan-dong	평산동	平山洞	1 dong

== Flag ==
According to the city's website, the flag of Yangsan depicts a "forward-looking city" which, like the magnolia, the city flower, "aims for a vibrant and hope-filled future in the 21st century".

The negative space in the center depicts the letter "Y" and represents the intersection of the Gyeongbu Expressway and Namhae Expressway within the city, while the blue depicts the letter "S" while representing the Yangsancheon Stream and the Nakdong River. The green symbolizes the "strong spirit of the Yangsan people", while the yellow represents hope or the future inspired by the sun.

== Attractions ==
- Tongdosa Temple (통도사)
- Naewon Temple (내원사)
- Yangsan Tower (양산타워)
- Yangsan Stadium (양산체육관)
- Eden Valley Ski Resort (에덴밸리 리조트)
- Hongryong Falls
- Yangsan Wondong Plum Blossom Festival
- Imgyeong dae (임경대)
- PyeongSan bookstroe (평산책방)

== Climate ==
Yangsan has a humid subtropical climate (Köppen: Cwa) with very warm summers and cold winters.

Climate data for Yangsan (2009–2020 normals, extremes 2009–present)
Month	Jan	Feb	Mar	Apr	May	Jun	Jul	Aug	Sep	Oct	Nov	Dec	Year
Record high °C (°F)	19.3 (66.7)	21.4 (70.5)	24.3 (75.7)	28.9 (84.0)	34.9 (94.8)	36.5 (97.7)	41.4 (106.5)	42.5 (108.5)	35.3 (95.5)	31.1 (88.0)	25.3 (77.5)	19.3 (66.7)	42.5 (108.5)
Mean daily maximum °C (°F)	7.7 (45.9)	9.9 (49.8)	14.7 (58.5)	19.5 (67.1)	25.1 (77.2)	27.8 (82.0)	30.4 (86.7)	32.1 (89.8)	27.5 (81.5)	22.8 (73.0)	16.6 (61.9)	9.4 (48.9)	20.3 (68.5)
Daily mean °C (°F)	2.3 (36.1)	4.6 (40.3)	8.9 (48.0)	13.7 (56.7)	19.1 (66.4)	22.7 (72.9)	26.1 (79.0)	27.4 (81.3)	22.6 (72.7)	17.0 (62.6)	10.7 (51.3)	4.0 (39.2)	14.9 (58.8)
Mean daily minimum °C (°F)	−2.4 (27.7)	−0.4 (31.3)	3.6 (38.5)	8.3 (46.9)	13.8 (56.8)	18.5 (65.3)	22.9 (73.2)	24.0 (75.2)	18.7 (65.7)	12.3 (54.1)	5.5 (41.9)	−0.8 (30.6)	10.3 (50.5)
Record low °C (°F)	−11.7 (10.9)	−10.9 (12.4)	−4.6 (23.7)	0.6 (33.1)	5.8 (42.4)	11.9 (53.4)	16.6 (61.9)	16.5 (61.7)	10.1 (50.2)	2.3 (36.1)	−2.3 (27.9)	−8.5 (16.7)	−11.7 (10.9)
Average precipitation mm (inches)	27.0 (1.06)	54.6 (2.15)	83.1 (3.27)	126.8 (4.99)	110.2 (4.34)	147.7 (5.81)	313.3 (12.33)	214.6 (8.45)	207.8 (8.18)	112.4 (4.43)	52.2 (2.06)	33.6 (1.32)	1,483.3 (58.40)
Average precipitation days (≥ 0.1 mm)	4.8	6.2	8.4	9.9	8.3	9.4	14.4	12.8	10.1	5.8	6.2	4.8	101.1
Average relative humidity (%)	48.7	52.9	56.7	59.0	62.2	68.9	77.0	74.0	72.5	66.9	61.9	52.8	62.8
Mean monthly sunshine hours	203.9	178.9	209.7	206.4	228.8	174.3	160.7	181.3	158.2	198.9	181.7	193.6	2,276.4
Source: Korea Meteorological Administration

== Transportation ==
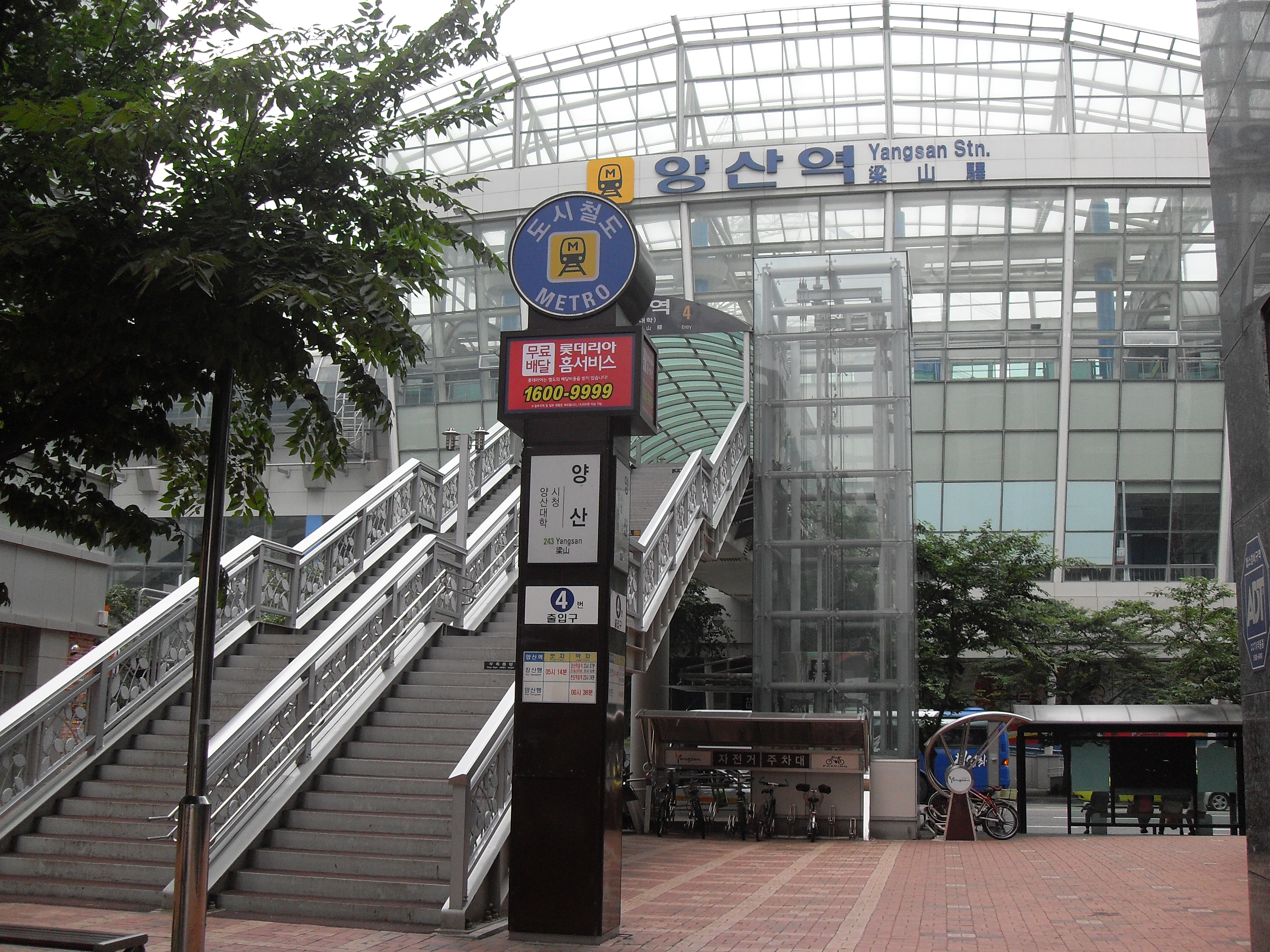
Yangsan station (Busan Subway Line 2)

=== Rail ===
Yangsan has two stations on the Gyeongbu Line: Mulgeum station (물금역) and Wondong station (원동역). The nearest KTX stations are Ulsan station in Ulsan and Gupo station in Busan.

=== Subway ===
Busan Subway Line 2 serves the city, with five stations currently operating: Yangsan Station, Namyangsan Station, Busan National University Yangsan Campus station, Jeungsan station and Hopo station. An additional station that will connect with the Yangsan Metro is currently under construction.

Yangsan Metro is under construction and is scheduled to open in 2024.

=== Bus ===
The city of Yangsan is served by a local bus system. In addition to serving the city itself, there are long-distance local buses to Busan, as well as inter-city lines connecting to Ulsan, Changwon, Gyeongju, and several other cities.

=== Highways ===
The Gyeongbu Expressway (#1) and the Jungang Expressway Branch Line (#551) run through the city of Yangsan.

In addition, National Route 35 bisects the city center.

== Government and politics ==
=== Politics ===
The city's mayor is Na Dong-yeon, a member of the People Power Party who was first elected in 2010. He was subsequently re-elected in 2014, 2022, and 2026, becoming the city's first four-term mayor.

=== Sister cities ===
- Jindo County, South Jeolla Province (Sept. 17, 1998)
- Yurihonjō, Akita, Japan (Oct. 10, 1998)
- Kulim, Kedah, Malaysia (Nov. 8, 2010)
- Sintra, Lisbon, Portugal (June 23, 2023)

== Notable people ==
- Winter, member of Aespa
- Kang Hye-won, member of Iz*One
- Yves, member of Loona
- Bae, member of Nmixx
- Ha Minwoo, member of ZE:A
- Exy, member of WJSN
- Yeon, member of Hearts2Hearts

== See also ==
- List of cities in South Korea
