= Busanjin District =

District of Busan, South Korea

Coordinates: 35°9′47″N 129°3′10″E

Busanjin
- Autonomous District
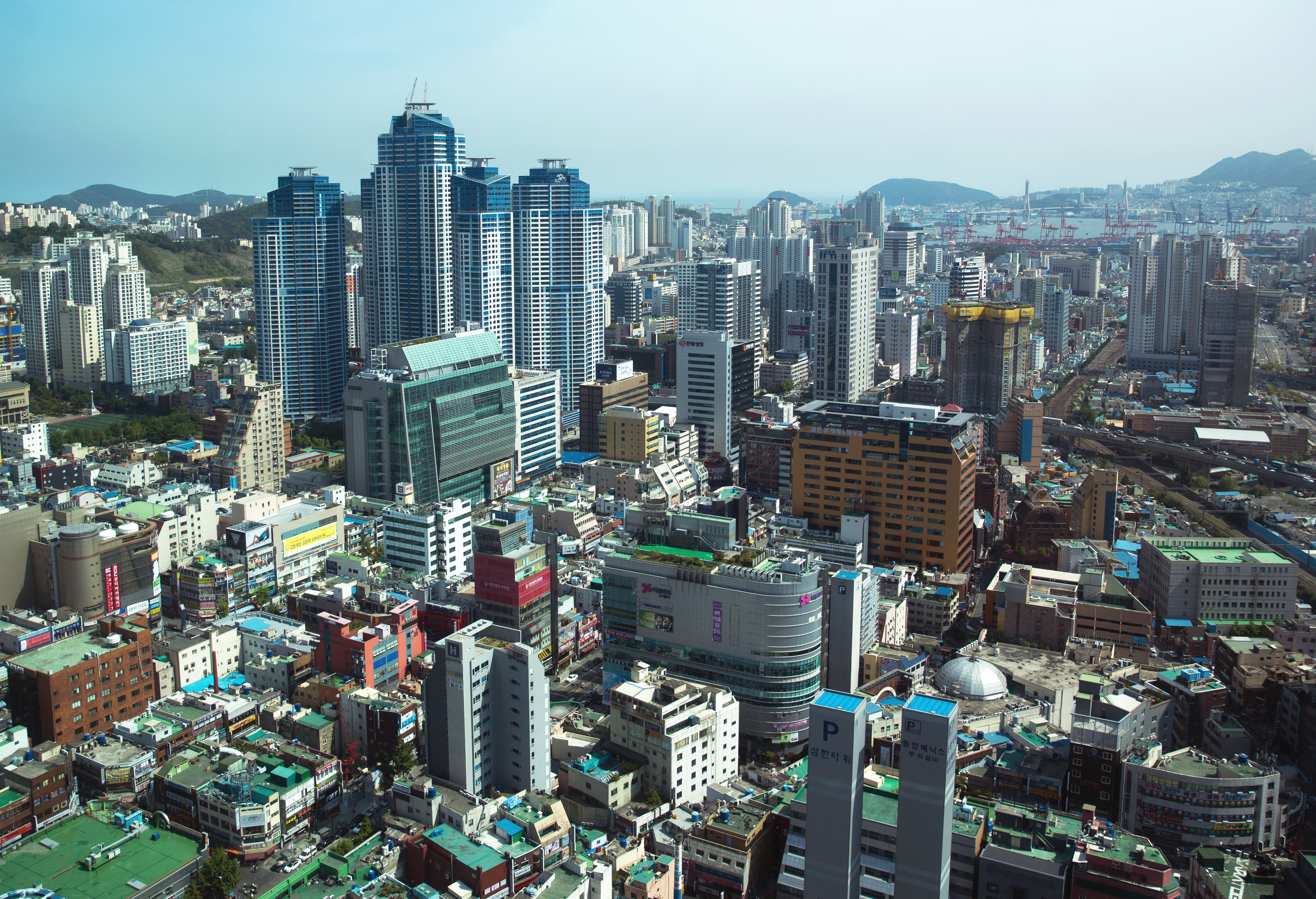

- Flag

- Country: South Korea
- Region: Yeongnam
- Provincial level: Busan
- Administrative divisions: 20 administrative dong

Government
  - Mayor: Kim Young-wook (김영욱)

Area
  - Total: 29.67 km^{2} (11.46 sq mi)

Population (September 2024)
  - Total: 361,437
  - Density: 13,880/km^{2} (35,900/sq mi)
  - Dialect: Gyeongsang
- Website: Busanjin District Office

Korean name
- Hangul: 부산진구
- Hanja: 釜山鎭區
- RR: Busanjin-gu
- MR: Pusanjin-gu

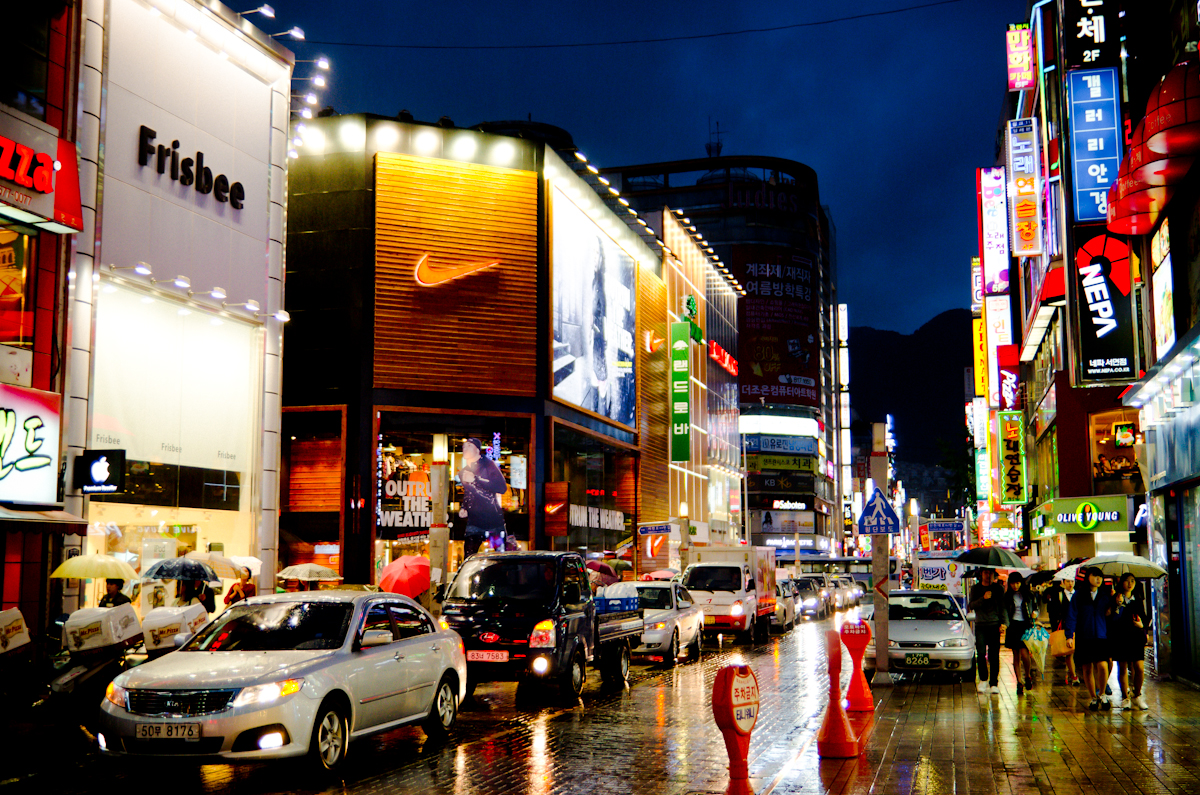
Seomyeon

Dong-eui University

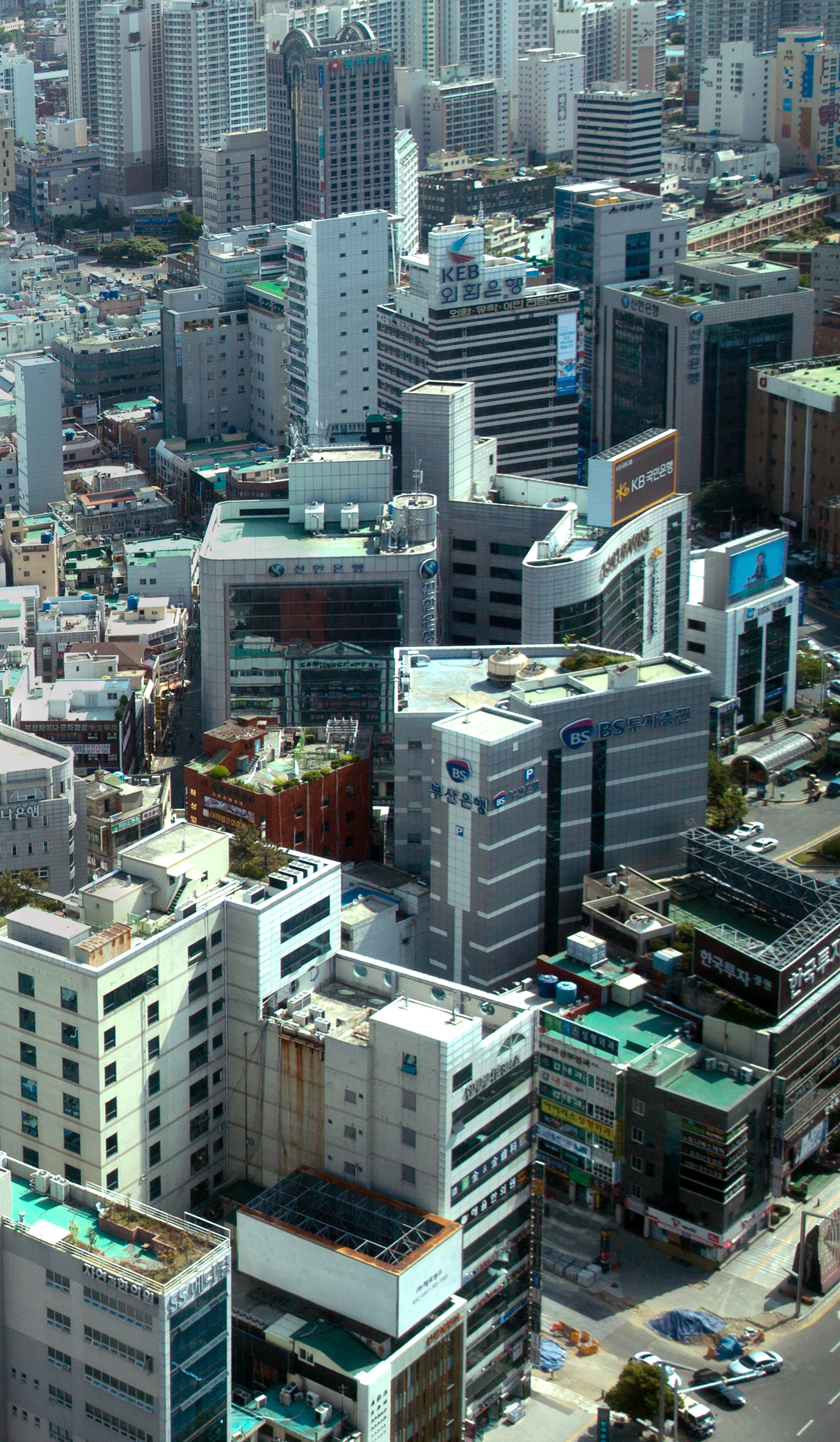
Buildings of Seomyeon

Busanjin District (Korean: 부산진구) is a gu in central Busan, South Korea. It has an area of 29.7 km^{2}, and a population of about 410,000. The name is sometimes abbreviated locally as "Jin-gu". Busanjin District is home to a major shopping, entertainment, and business area called Seomyeon.

== Administrative divisions ==
Administrative divisions

Busanjin District is divided into 11 legal dong, which altogether comprise 20 administrative dong, as follows:

- Bujeon-dong (釜田洞; 2 administrative dong)
- Beomjeon-dong (凡田洞; part of the administrative Bujeon 1(il)-dong)
- Yeonji-dong (蓮池洞)
- Choeup-dong (草邑洞)
- Yangjeong-dong (楊亭洞; 2 administrative dong)
- Jeonpo-dong (田浦洞; 2 administrative dong)
- Buam-dong (釜岩洞; 2 administrative dong)
- Danggam-dong (堂甘洞; 3 administrative dong)
- Gaya-dong (伽倻洞; 2 administrative dong)
- Gaegeum-dong (開琴洞; 3 administrative dong)
- Beomcheon-dong (凡川洞; 2 administrative dong)

== Politics ==
The northern part of Busanjin is represented by Busanjin District First national assembly constituency and the southern part of Busanjin is represented by Busanjin District Second national assembly constituency

== Economy ==
Air Busan has its headquarters in Busanjin District.
Daewoo Bus Corporation has the Busan Plant located.
Busan Citizens Park (formerly Camp Hialeah) is a former Imperial Japanese Army base and United States Army camp located in the district.

== Education ==
Gyeongwon High School

== Landmarks ==
- Song Sang-hyeon Square
- Busan Citizens Park

== See also ==
- Busanjin Station
- Camp Hialeah
- Geography of South Korea

== Cityscape ==
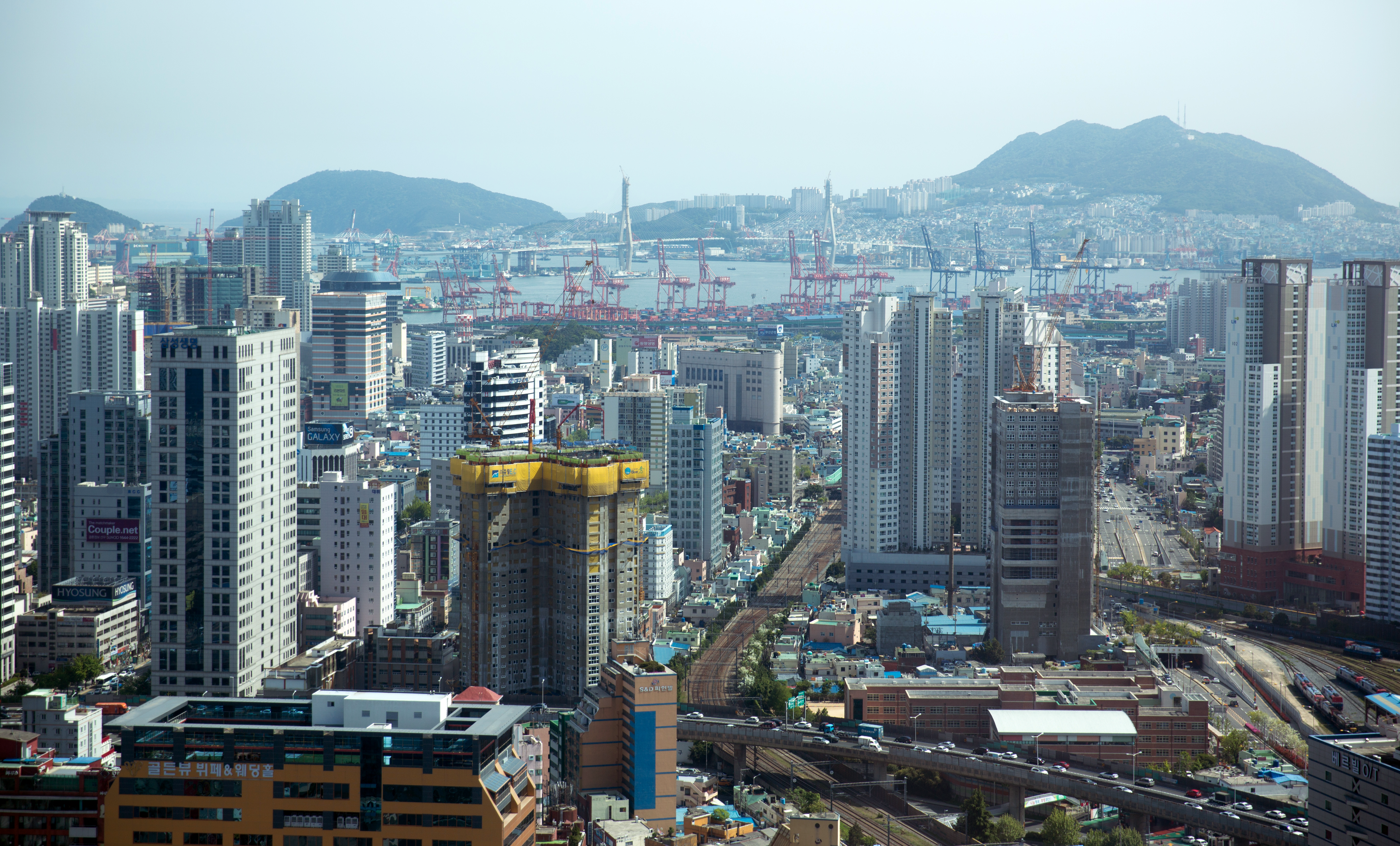

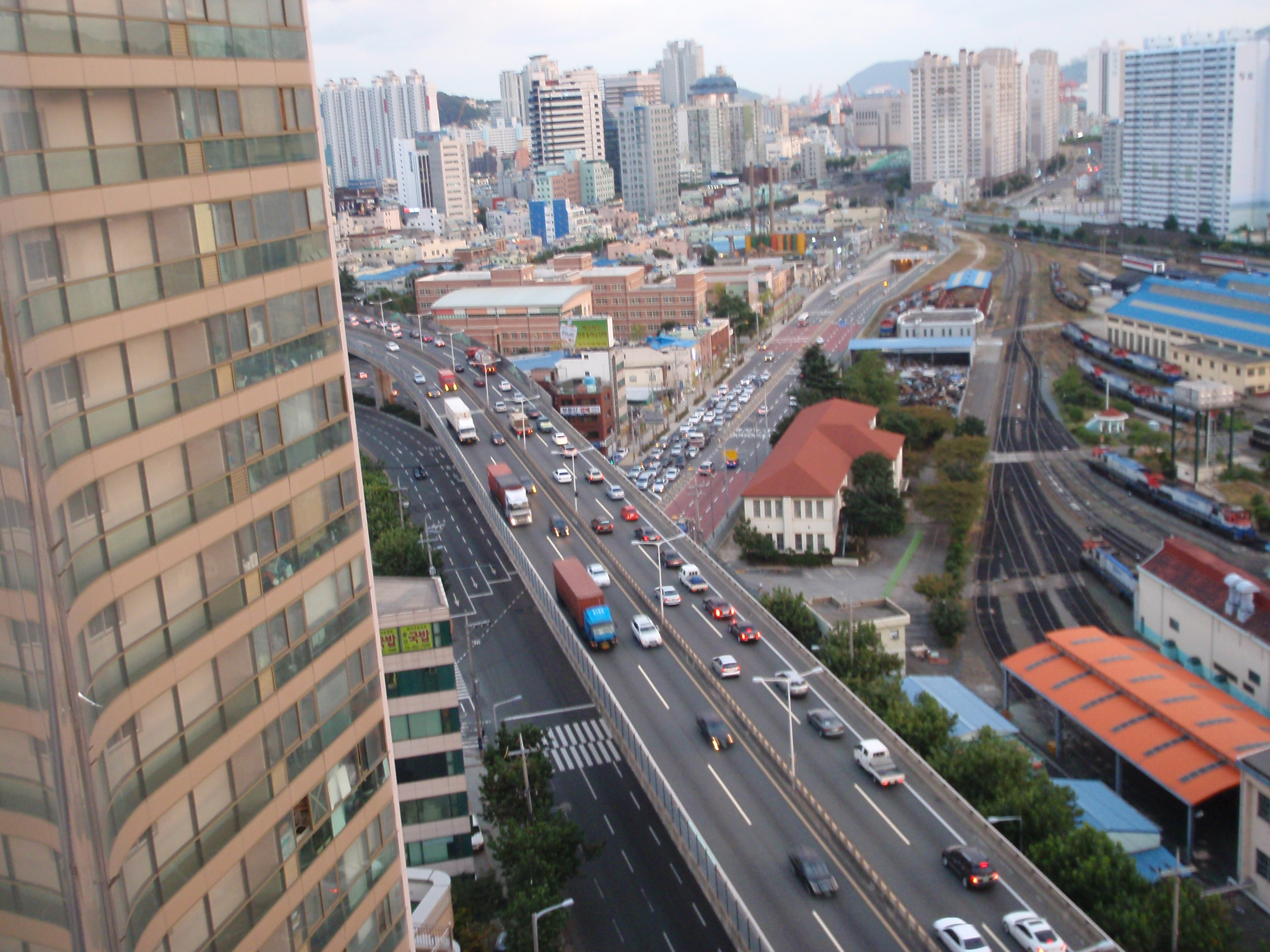

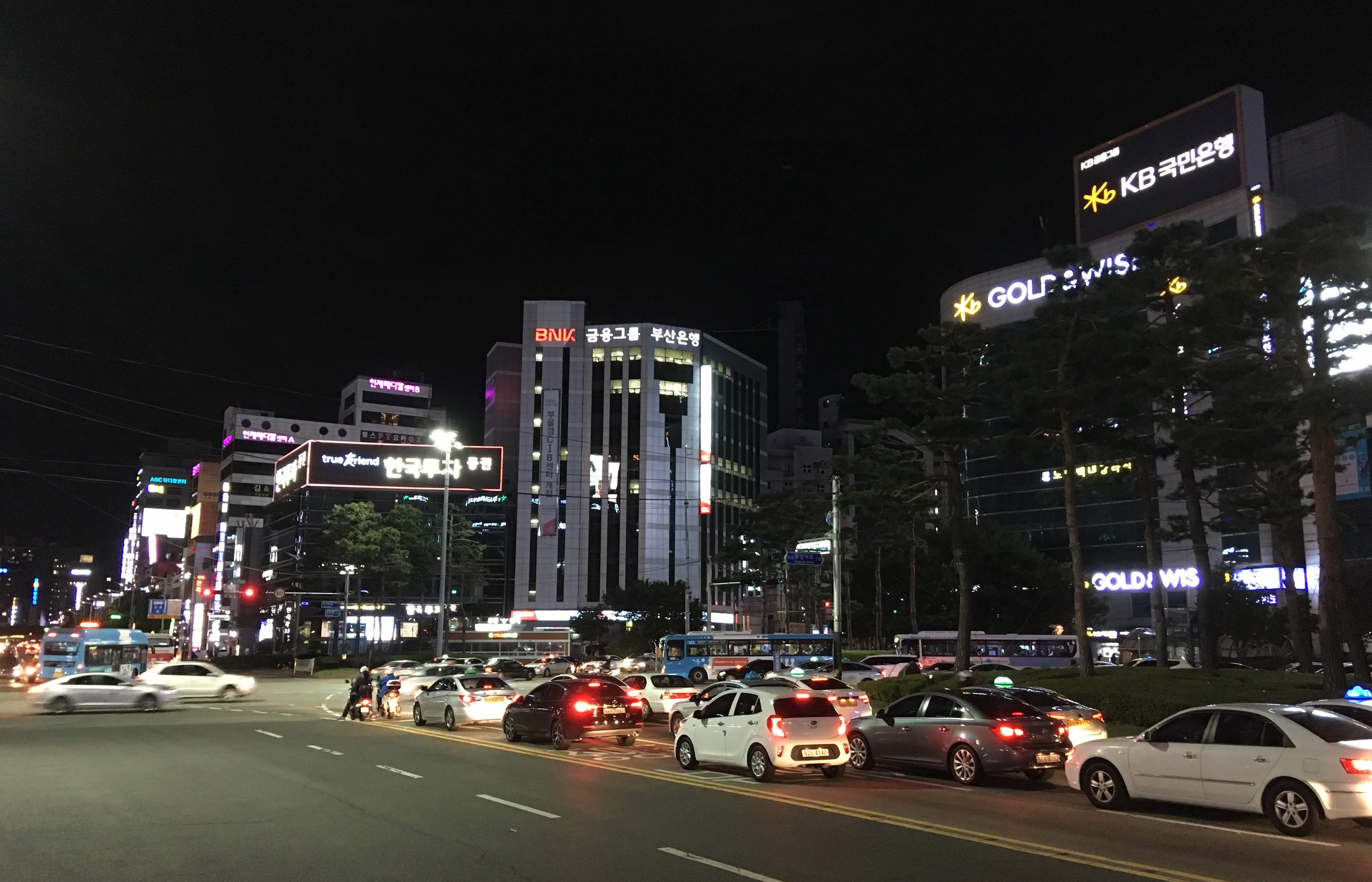

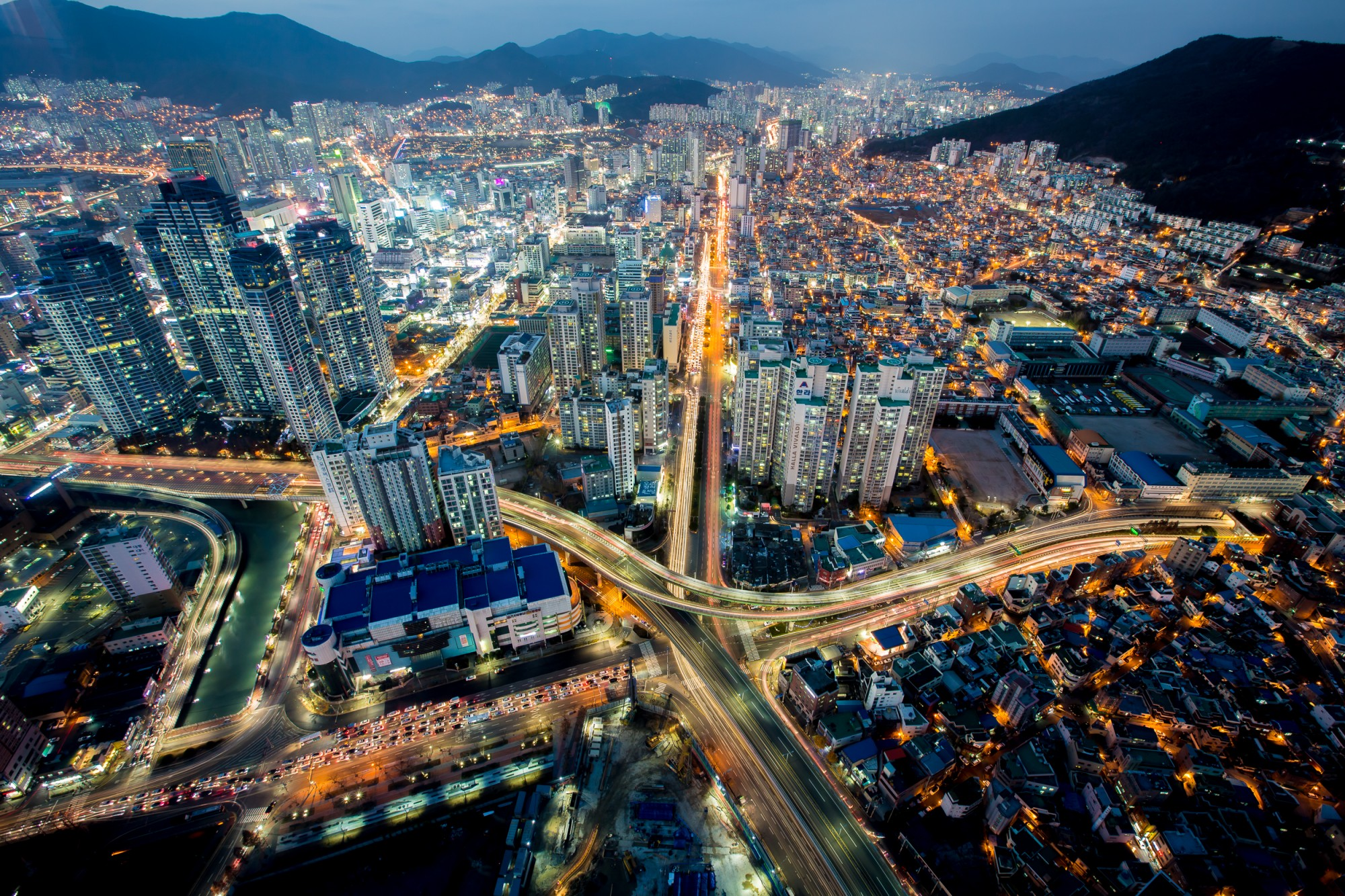
