= Suyeong District =

District of Busan, South Korea

Coordinates: 35°10′19″N 129°6′35″E

Suyeong
- Autonomous District
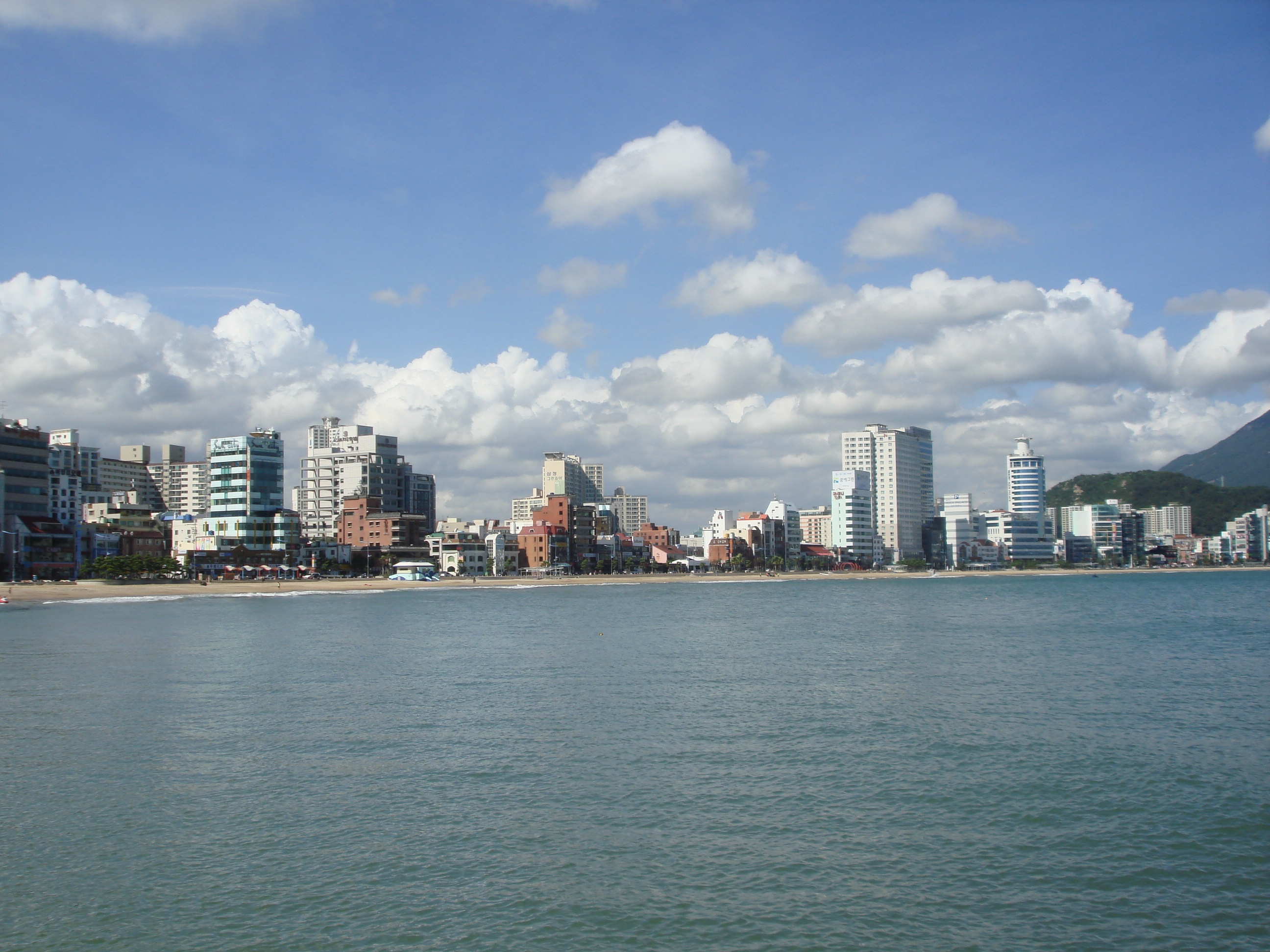
- Gwangalli Beach in Gwangan-dong

- Country: South Korea
- Region: Yeongnam
- Provincial level: Busan
- Administrative divisions: 10 administrative dong

Government
  - Mayor: Kang Seong-tae (강성태)

Area
  - Total: 10.21 km^{2} (3.94 sq mi)

Population (2024)
  - Total: 172,329
  - Density: 16,880/km^{2} (43,710/sq mi)
  - Dialect: Gyeongsang
- Website: Suyeong District Office

Korean name
- Hangul: 수영구
- Hanja: 水營區
- RR: Suyeong-gu
- MR: Suyŏng-gu

Suyeong District (Korean: 수영구) is a district (gu) in central Busan, South Korea. It has a population density of about 17,768 inhabitants per square kilometer (46,020/sq mi).

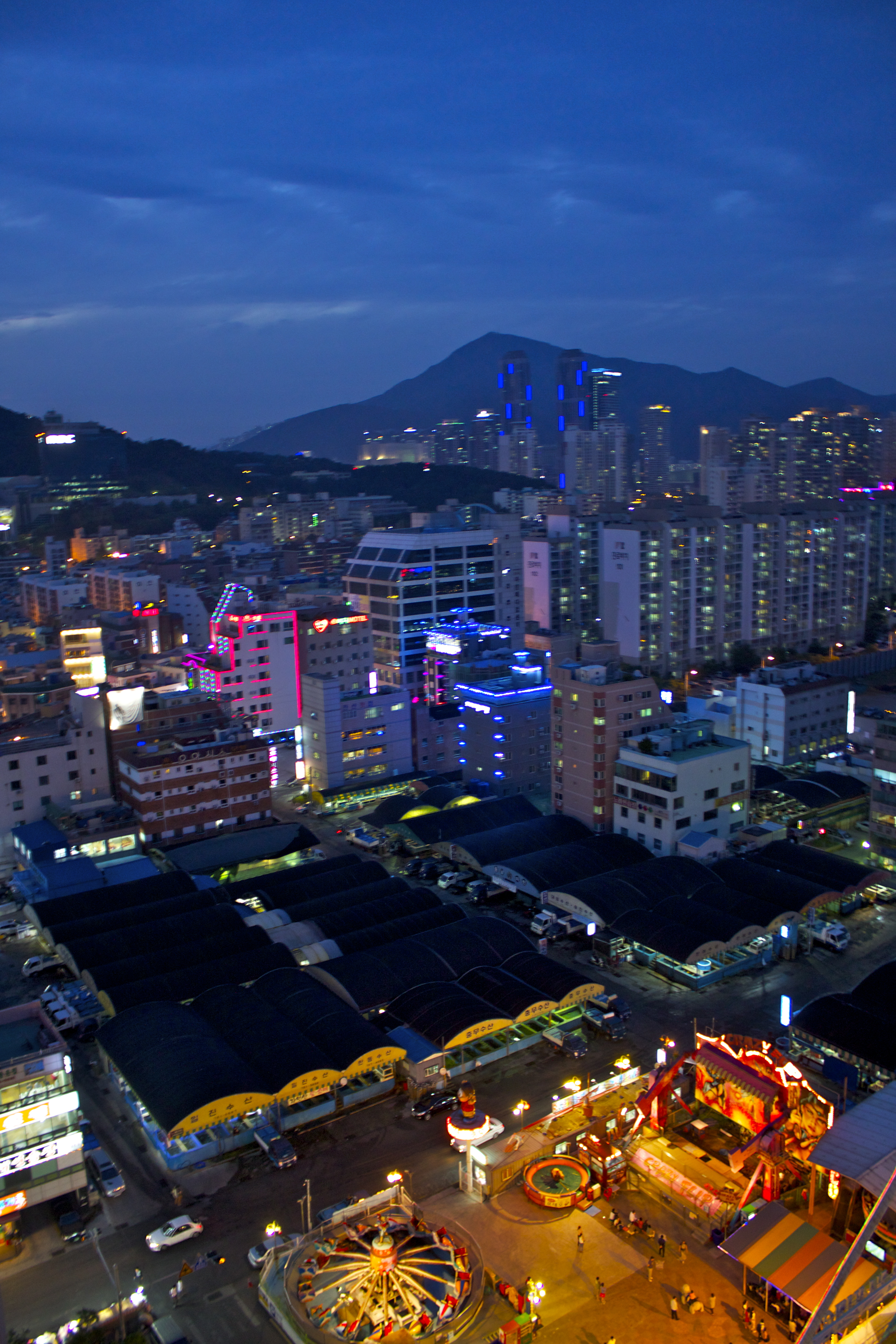
Nightscape of Suyeong District

Suyeong District was created in 1995 following its separation from Nam District. It is border in the North-East by the Suyeonggang River. The name 'Suyeong' came from 'Gyeongsang JwaSuyeong', means navy command of Gyeongsang left area (stand at Seoul and see south, this area is left side). The line 2 of Busan Subway runs through Suyeong District with 5 stations, from Millak to Namcheon. The southern terminal of line 3 is Suyeong station, making Suyeong an important location for subway transportation/transfers.

== Administrative divisions ==
Administrative divisions

Suyeong District is divided into five legal dong, which altogether comprise ten administrative dong, as follows:

- Namcheon-dong (two administrative dong)
- Suyeong-dong
- Mangmi-dong (two administrative dong)
- Gwangan-dong (four administrative dong)
- Millak-dong

== Education ==
=== International schools ===
- Busan Japanese School

== See also ==
- Gwangan Bridge
- Fortress site of Jwasuyeong
- Geography of South Korea
