= Yangsan station =

Station of the Busan Metro

243 양산 (시청) Yangsan (City Hall)
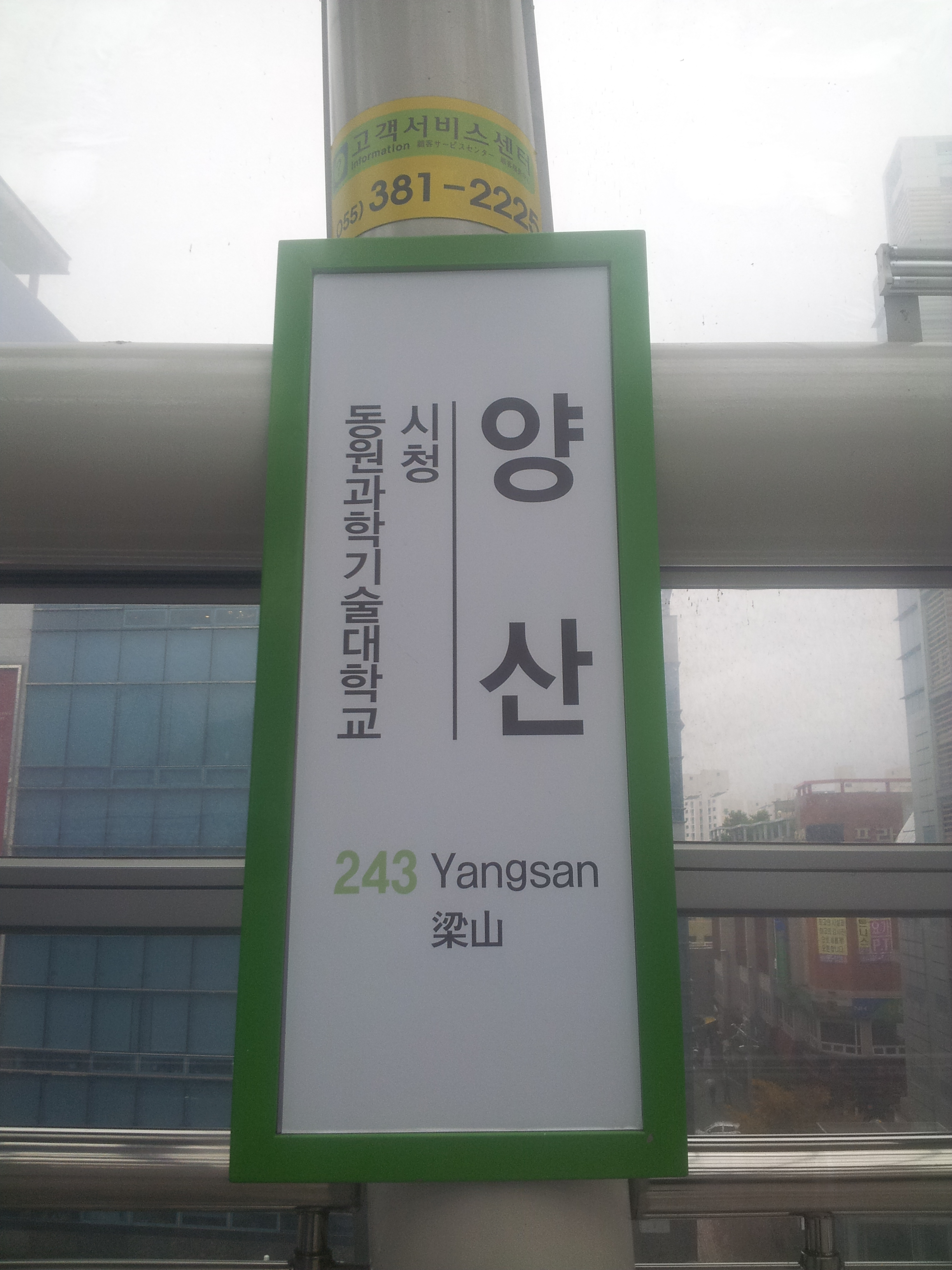

Korean name
- Hangul: 양산역
- Hanja: 梁山驛
- Revised Romanization: Yangsan-nyeok
- McCune–Reischauer: Yangsan-nyŏk

General information
- Location: Jungbu-dong, Yangsan, South Gyeongsang; South Korea
- Coordinates: 35°20′19″N 129°01′36″E
- Operator: Busan Transportation Corporation
- Line: Busan Metro Line 2
- Platforms: 2
- Tracks: 2

Construction
- Structure type: Elevated
- Accessible: yes

Other information
- Station code: 243

History
- Opened: January 10, 2008; 18 years ago

Services
Preceding station	Busan Metro	Following station
Namyangsan towards Jangsan	Line 2	Terminus
Location

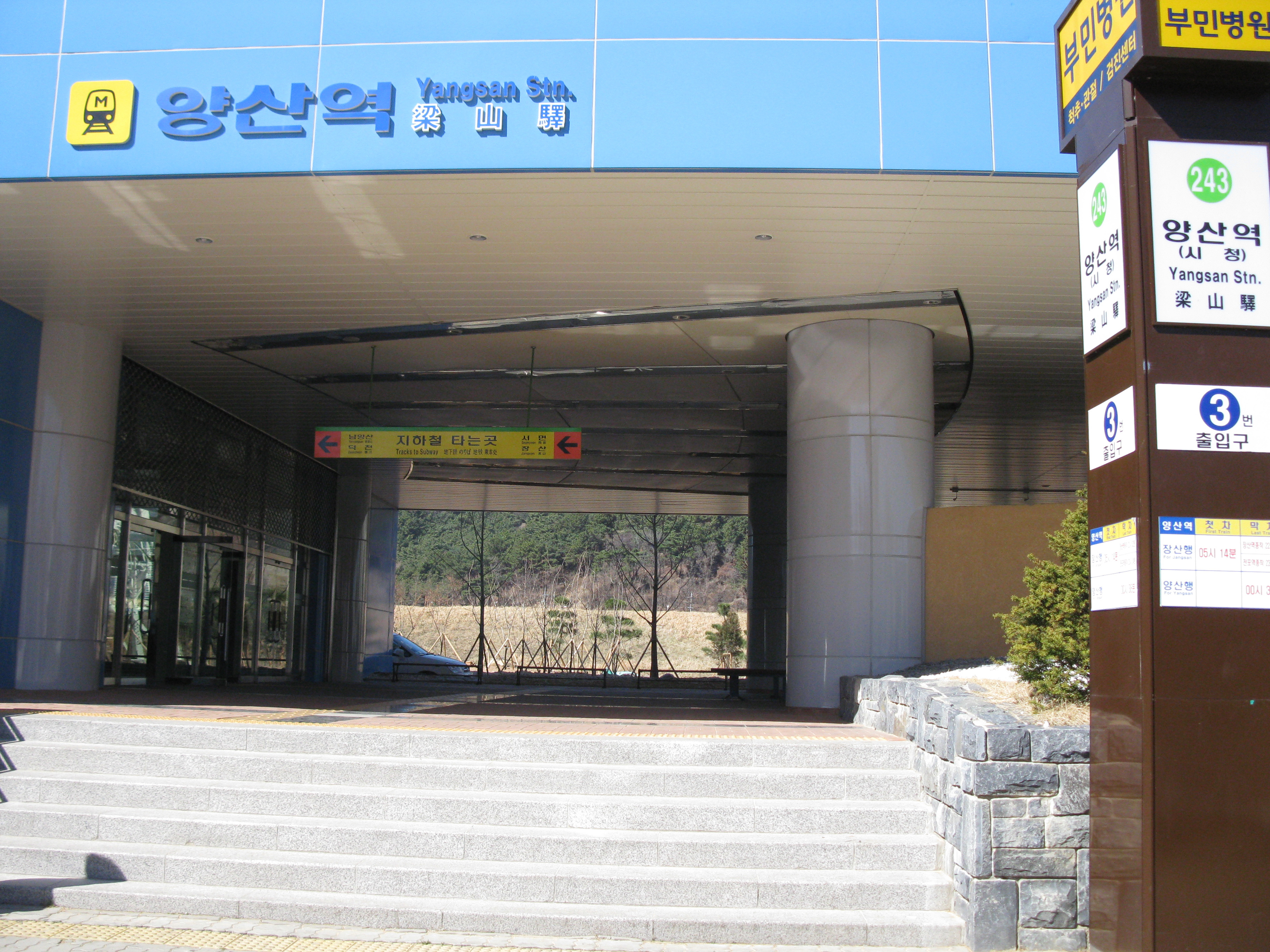
Outside

Yangsan Station is the western terminus of the Busan Metro Line 2 located in Jungbu-dong, Yangsan, South Gyeongsang. The subname in parentheses is City Hall.

== History ==
- 10 January 2008: The Busan Metropolitan Rapid Transit Line 2's Hopo Station-Yangsan Station (excluding Pusan Nat'l Univ. Yangsan Campus) is extended and opened as the terminating station.
- 2010 October 18: Increased the number of train stops from 161 to 306 times.

== See also ==
- Dongwon Institute of Science and Technology
