= Jangsan station =

Station of the Busan Metro

201 장산 (해운대백병원) Jangsan (Haeundae Baek Hospital)
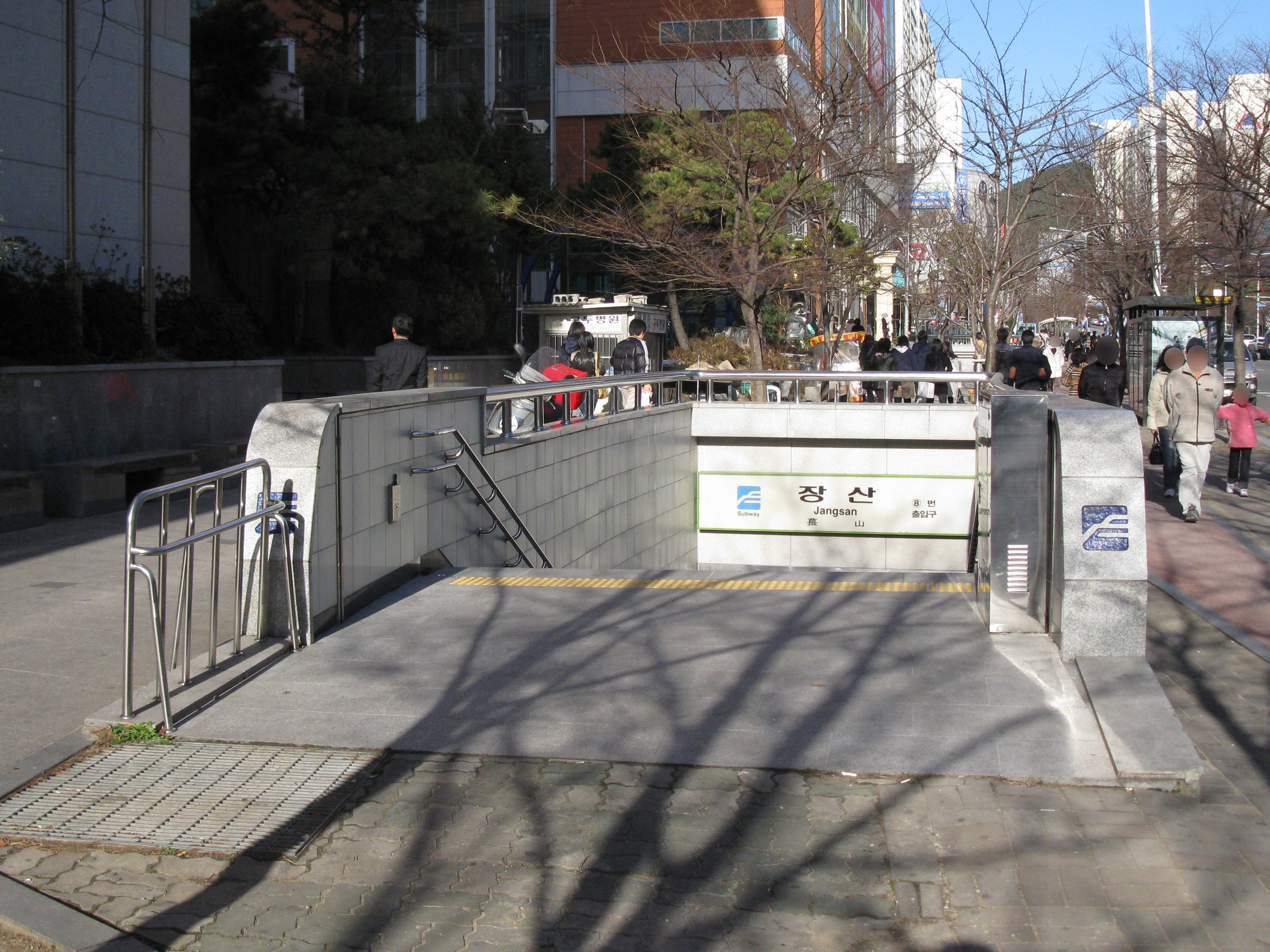
- Jangsan Station Entrance No. 8

Korean name
- Hangul: 장산역
- Hanja: 萇山驛
- Revised Romanization: Jangsannyeok
- McCune–Reischauer: Changsannyŏk

General information
- Location: Jwa-dong, Haeundae District, Busan; South Korea
- Coordinates: 35°10′11.69″N 129°10′37.18″E
- Operator: Busan Transportation Corporation
- Line: Line 2
- Platforms: 1
- Tracks: 2

Construction
- Structure type: Underground
- Accessible: Yes

Other information
- Station code: 201

History
- Opened: August 29, 2002; 24 years ago

Services
Preceding station	Busan Metro	Following station
Terminus	Line 2	Jung-dong towards Yangsan
Location

Jangsan Station (Korean: 장산역; Hanja: 萇山驛) is the eastern terminus of the Busan Metro Line 2 located in Jwa-dong, Haeundae District, Busan. The subname in parentheses is Haeundae Baek Hospital.

== Station Layout ==
G	Street Level	Exits
L1; Concourse	Lobby	Customer Service, Shops, Vending machines, ATMs
L2; Platforms	Northbound	← Line 2 Alighting Passengers Only
L2; Platforms	Island platform, doors open on the right
L2; Platforms	Southbound	→ Line 2 toward Yangsan (Jung-dong)

== Gallery ==
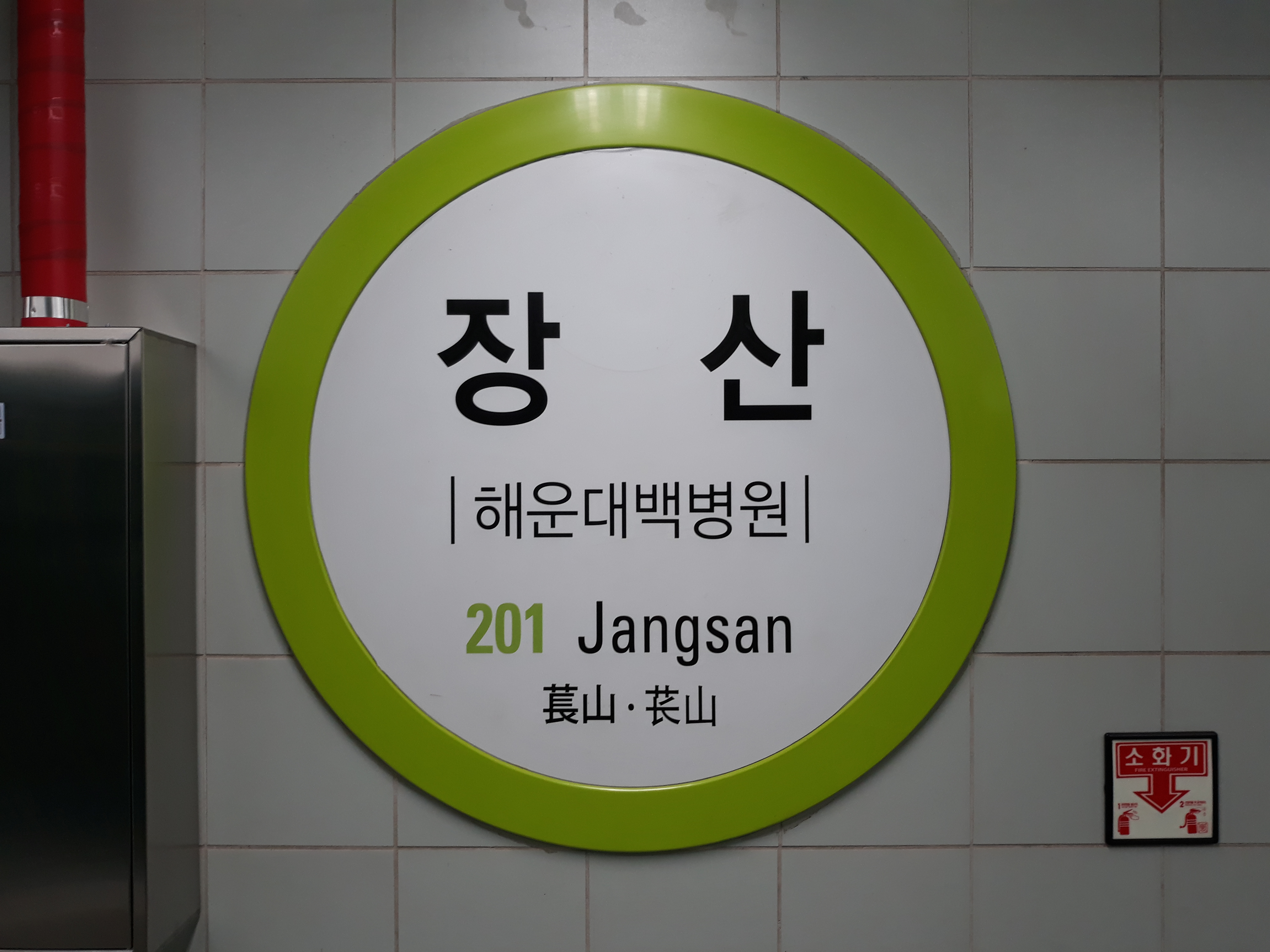
Station Sign
