= Yongho-dong =

Yongho-dong may refer to any of three distinct administrative divisions of South Korea:

- Yongho-dong, Busan, in Nam-gu
- Yongho-dong, Changwon
- Yongho-dong, Daejeon
