= List of tallest buildings in Busan =

This list of tallest buildings in Busan ranks skyscrapers in the South Korean city of Busan by height. Most of the city's tallest buildings are concentrated in Marine City and Centum City, an area just west of the famed Haeundae beach. However, there are also skyscrapers in other districts, such as the Busan International Financial Center in the Nam-Gu district.

== Tallest buildings ==
This lists ranks Busan's skyscrapers that stand at least 150m tall, based on standard height measurement. This includes spires and architectural details but does not include antenna masts. Existing structures are included for ranking purposes based on present height.

Rank	Name	Image	Height m (ft)	Floors	Year	District	Notes
1	Haeundae LCT The Sharp Landmark Tower		411 m (1,348 ft)	101	2010	Haeundae District	
2	Haeundae LCT The Sharp Tower A		339 m (1,112 ft)	85	2010	Haeundae District	
3	Haeundae LCT The Sharp Tower B		333 m (1,093 ft)	85	2010	Haeundae District	
4	Haeundae We've the Zenith Tower A		300 m (980 ft)	80	2011	Haeundae District	
5	Haeundae I'Park Marina Tower 2		292 m (958 ft)	72	2011	Haeundae District	
6	Busan International Finance Center		289 m (948 ft)	63	2014	Nam District	
7	Haeundae We've the Zenith Tower B		282 m (925 ft)	75	2011	Haeundae District	
8	Haeundae I'Park Marina Tower 1		273 m (896 ft)	66	2011	Haeundae District	
9	Haeundae We've the Zenith Tower C		265 m (869 ft)	71	2011	Haeundae District	
10	Hillstate Ijin Bay City Tower A		247 m (810 ft)	69	2022	Seo District	
11	The W 101		246 m (807 ft)	69	2018	Nam District	
12	The W 102		246 m (807 ft)	69	2018	Nam District	
13	The W 103		246 m (807 ft)	69	2018	Nam District	
14	The W 104		246 m (807 ft)	69	2018	Nam District	
15	Posco the Sharp Centum Star Tower B		212 m (696 ft)	60	2008	Haeundae District	
16	Seomyeon The Sharp Central Star A		207 m (679 ft)	58	2011	Busanjin District	
17	Haeundae I'Park Marina Tower 3		205 m (673 ft)	46	2011	Haeundae District	
18	Centum Leadersmark		200 m (660 ft)	46	2008	Haeundae District	
18	Hyupsung Marina G7 A		200 m (660 ft)	61	2021	Dong District	
18	Hyupsung Marina G7 B		200 m (660 ft)	61	2021	Dong District	
21	Daewoo Aratrium Haeundae		198 m (650 ft)	42	2013	Haeundae District	
22	Kyungdong Jade 103		190 m (620 ft)	47	2012	Haeundae District	
23	Posco the Sharp Centum Star Tower C		189 m (620 ft)	52	2008	Haeundae District	
23	Hillstate Ijin Bay City Tower B		189 m (620 ft)	59	2022	Seo District	
23	Hillstate Ijin Bay City Tower C		189 m (620 ft)	59	2022	Seo District	
26	BI CITY Officetel		188 m (617 ft)	49	2018	Nam District	
27	WBC The Palace Tower 1		186 m (610 ft)	51	2011	Haeundae District	
27	WBC The Palace Tower 2		186 m (610 ft)	51	2011	Haeundae District	
29	Posco the Sharp Centum Star Tower A		184 m (604 ft)	51	2008	Haeundae District	
30	SK Hub Sky 1		182 m (597 ft)	49	2006	Dongnae District	
30	SK Hub Sky 2		182 m (597 ft)	49	2006	Dongnae District	
32	AID Sea Colony Tower 102		176 m (577 ft)	53	2013	Haeundae District	
32	AID Sea Colony Tower 202		176 m (577 ft)	53	2014	Haeundae District	
32	BI CITY Hotel & Office		176 m (577 ft)	37	2018	Nam District	
35	Lotte Hotel Busan		173 m (568 ft)	43	1995	Busanjin District	
36	Seomyeon The Sharp Central Star C		170 m (560 ft)	48	2011	Busanjin District	
36	Seomyeon The Sharp Central Star D		170 m (560 ft)	48	2011	Busanjin District	
36	Haeundae Iaan Exordium 101		170 m (560 ft)	45	2009	Haeundae District	
36	Majestower Beomil Tower 101		170 m (560 ft)	40	2009	Dong District	
36	Majestower Beomil Tower 102		170 m (560 ft)	40	2009	Dong District	
41	Seomyeon The Sharp Central Star E		169 m (554 ft)	47	2011	Busanjin District	
42	Seomyeon The Sharp Central Star B		167 m (548 ft)	47	2011	Busanjin District	
43	AID Sea Colony Tower 104		165 m (541 ft)	49	2013	Haeundae District	
43	Kyungdong Jade 102		163 m (535 ft)	40	2012	Haeundae District	
43	Ocean Bridge 101		162 m (531 ft)	48	2017	Dong District	
43	Ocean Bridge 102		162 m (531 ft)	48	2017	Dong District	
43	Marine City Xi		162 m (531 ft)	49	2019	Haeundae District	
48	Majestower Beomil Tower 103		160 m (520 ft)	36	2009	Dong District	
49	AID Sea Colony Tower 201		159 m (522 ft)	47	2014	Haeundae District	
50	The Sharp Centum Park 102		158 m (518 ft)	51	2005	Haeundae District	
50	The Sharp Centum Park 104		158 m (518 ft)	51	2005	Haeundae District	
50	The Sharp Centum Park 106		158 m (518 ft)	51	2005	Haeundae District	
50	The Sharp Centum Park 107		158 m (518 ft)	51	2005	Haeundae District	
50	The Sharp Centum Park 109		158 m (518 ft)	51	2005	Haeundae District	
50	The Sharp Centum Park 110		158 m (518 ft)	51	2005	Haeundae District	
50	The Sharp Centum Park 112		158 m (518 ft)	51	2005	Haeundae District	
50	The Sharp Centum Park 113		158 m (518 ft)	51	2005	Haeundae District	
50	The Sharp Centum Park 114		158 m (518 ft)	51	2005	Haeundae District	
59	Hotel Lamuette		155 m (509 ft)	42	2015	Haeundae District	
60	Centum Sky Biz		154 m (505 ft)	42	2017	Haeundae District	
61	Royal Duke Vista 48 Tower 103		153 m (502 ft)	48	2014	Buk District	
61	Royal Duke Vista 48 Tower 104		153 m (502 ft)	48	2014	Buk District	
61	AID Sea Colony Tower 105		153 m (502 ft)	45	2013	Haeundae District	
61	Kyungdong Jade 101		153 m (502 ft)	43	2012	Haeundae District	
61	The Sharp Centum Park 202		153 m (502 ft)	50	2005	Haeundae District	
61	The Sharp Centum Park 204		153 m (502 ft)	50	2005	Haeundae District	
61	The Sharp Centum Park 206		153 m (502 ft)	50	2005	Haeundae District	
68	AID Sea Colony Tower 103		152 m (499 ft)	45	2013	Haeundae District	
68	AID Sea Colony Tower 204		152 m (499 ft)	45	2014	Haeundae District	
70	Royal Duke Vista 48 Tower 101		150 m (490 ft)	48	2014	Buk District	
70	Royal Duke Vista 48 Tower 102		150 m (490 ft)	48	2014	Buk District	
70	Park Hyatt Busan		150 m (490 ft)	34	2012	Haeundae District	

== Timeline of tallest buildings in Busan ==
Name	Image	Height m (ft)	Floors	Period	District	Notes
Old Kookje Daily News Headquarters		60 m (200 ft)	16	1977-1994	Jung District	
Kookje Daily News Headquarters		110 m (360 ft)	26	1994-1997	Yeonje District	
Lotte Hotel Busan		173 m (568 ft)	43	1997-2006	Busanjin District	
SK Hub Sky		182 m (597 ft)	49	2006-2008	Dongnae District	
Posco the Sharp Centum Star B		212 m (696 ft)	60	2008-2011	Haeundae District	
Haeundae We've the Zenith Tower A		300 m (980 ft)	80	2011-2019	Haeundae District	
Haeundae LCT The Sharp Landmark Tower		411 m (1,348 ft)	101	2019–present	Haeundae District	Tallest building in Busan

== Tallest buildings under construction ==
This lists buildings that are under construction in Busan and are planned to rise at least 150 m (490 ft). Buildings that have been topped out but are not completed are also included.

Name	Height m (ft)	Floors	Completion	District	Notes
Busan Lotte Tower	342 m (1,122 ft)	67	2026	Jung District	To be classified as tower rather than building
Lotte Castle De Mer A	213 m (699 ft)	59	2025	Dong District	
Lotte Castle De Mer B	213 m (699 ft)	59	2025	Dong District	
Busan International Finance Center Phase 3	199 m (653 ft)	45	2025	Nam District	

== Tallest proposed or approved ==
This lists ranks Busan's skyscrapers over 150m that are currently proposed/approved for construction.

Name	Height m (ft)	Floors	Completion	District	Notes
The Gate Centum A	340 m (1,120 ft)	88	2021	Haeundae District	Approved
The Gate Centum B	290 m (950 ft)	77	2021	Haeundae District	Approved
