= Munhyeon station =

Station of the Busan Metro

216 문현 Munhyeon
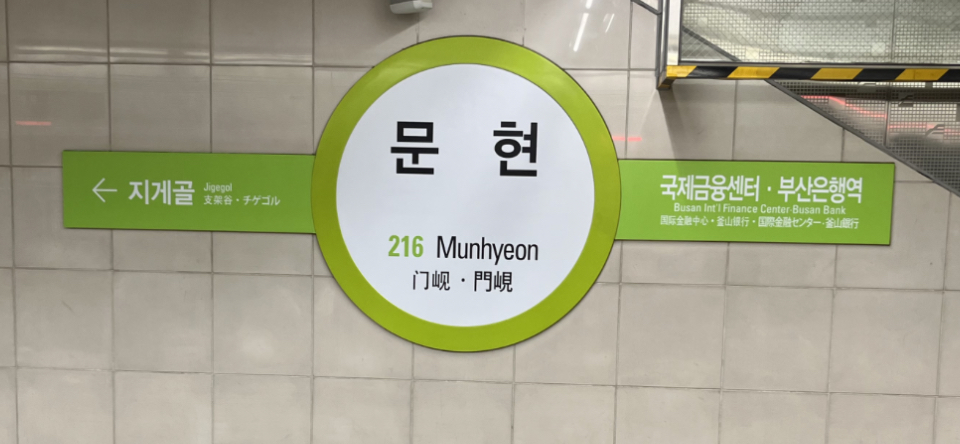

Korean name
- Hangul: 문현역
- Hanja: 門峴驛
- Revised Romanization: Munhyeon yeok
- McCune–Reischauer: Munhyŏn yŏk

General information
- Location: Munhyeon-dong, Nam District, Busan; South Korea
- Coordinates: 35.1391°N 129.0674°E
- Operator: Busan Transportation Corporation
- Line: Busan Metro Line 2
- Platforms: 2
- Tracks: 2

Construction
- Structure type: Underground

Other information
- Station code: 216

History
- Opened: August 8, 2001; 25 years ago
Location

Munhyeon Station (Korean: 문현역; Hanja: 門峴驛) is a station on the Busan Metro Line 2 in Munhyeon-dong, Nam District, Busan, South Korea.

Preceding station	Busan Metro	Following station
Jigegol towards Jangsan	Line 2	Busan International Finance Center–Busan Bank towards Yangsan
