= High school standardization policy in South Korea =

The high school standardization policy was introduced in South Korea in order to reduce the gap between high schools in the region since 1974, and instead of selecting students from high schools in the region, the entire student population is divided into general schools in each district.

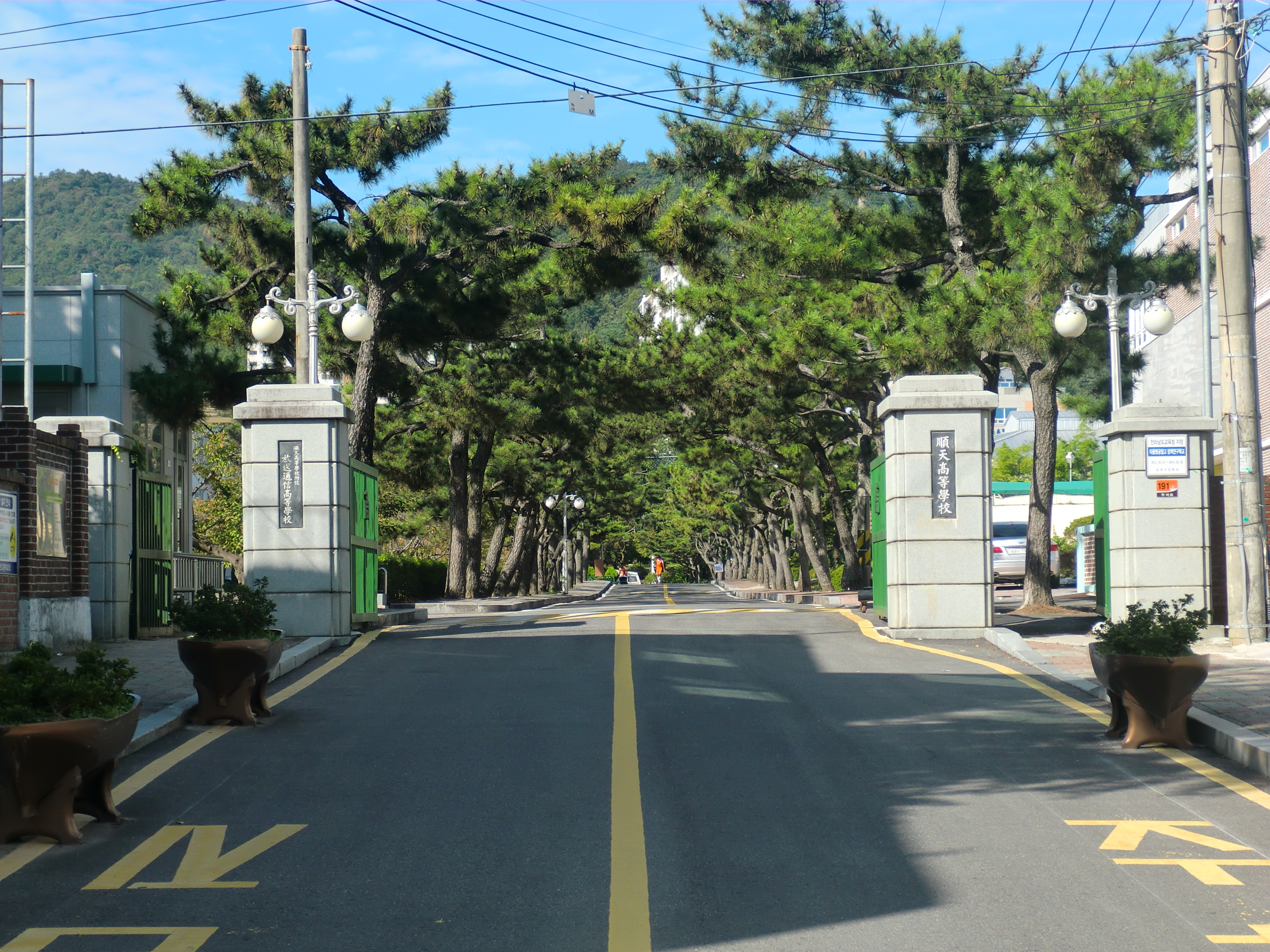
Suncheon High School, Suncheon, 2013

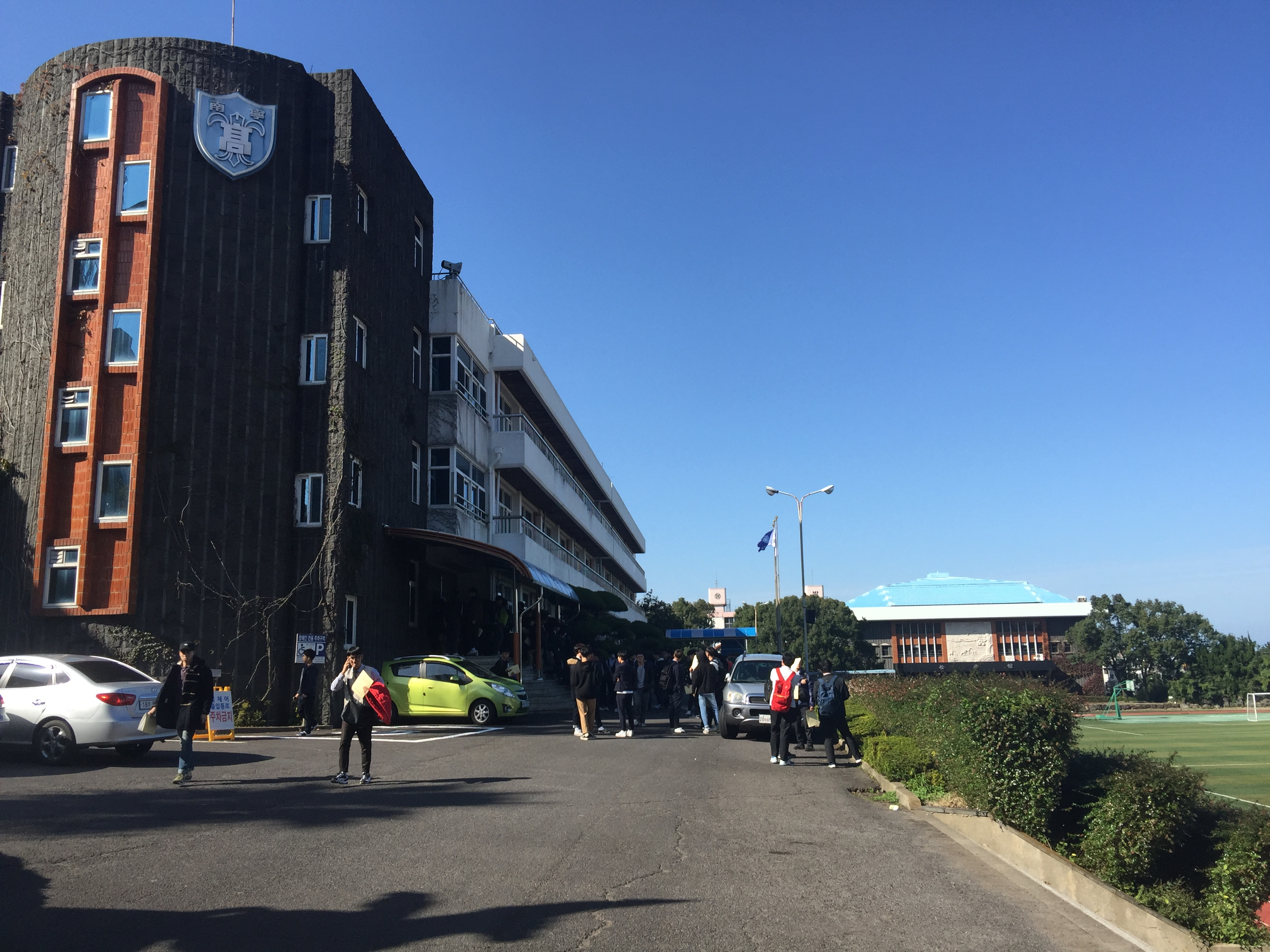
Namnyeong High School, Jeju Province, 2016

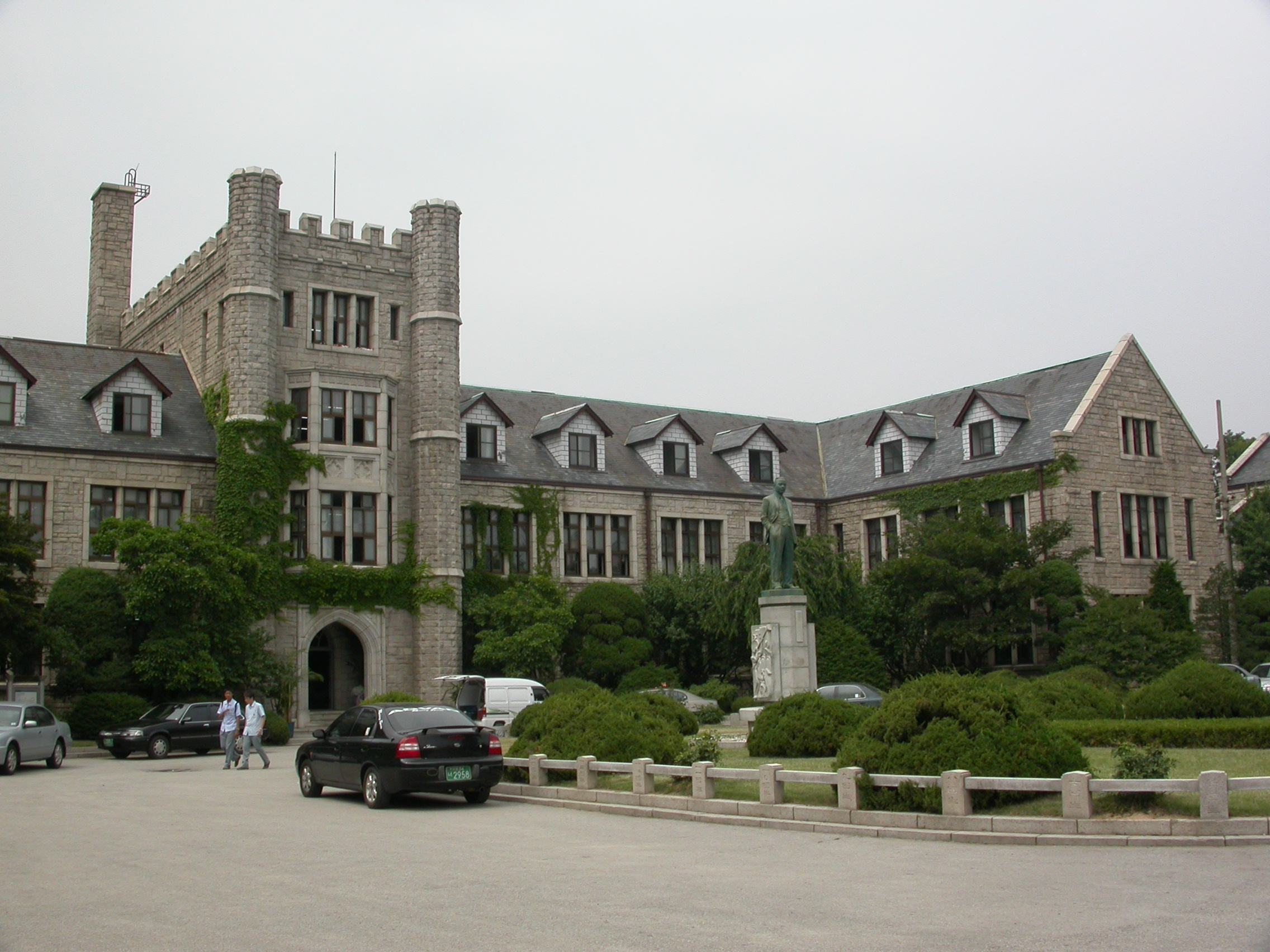
Choong Ang High School, Seoul, 2005

South Korea High Schools

== Background ==
The standardization policy was introduced in 1974 with the aim of preventing the excessive burden of learning among middle school students due to the increase in the number of students and the preparation of high school entrance exams, overheated competition to enter prestigious high schools and concentration of the population in urban areas. It is also known as a policy to improve problems caused by rote-based cramming and reduce the educational gap between high schools. It is also a follow-up to the middle school's non-exam admission system, which took effect in 1969.

== Each region's standardization process and present condition ==
It was standardized in Seoul and Busan in 1974 and expanded to Daegu, Incheon and Gwangju in 1975. Daejeon, Jeonju, Masan, Cheongju, Suwon, Chuncheon, Jeju in 1979, Changwon, Seongnam, Cheonan, Gunsan, Iri (now Iksan) in 1980, the areas of Mokpo, Andong and Jinju were leveled. However, the standardization policy was abolished in Chuncheon, Wonju, Cheonan, Mokpo, Andong, Gunsan and Iri stations as the debate continued that the standardization policy was ineffective in small urban areas. However, in 2000, Ulsan Metropolitan City (Distribution), Gwacheon City (Pyeongchon), Anyang City (Pyeongchon), Gunpo City (Sanbon), Uiwang City, Bucheon City (Middle East), and Goyang City (Silsan) were leveled. Since then, Yeosu, South Jeolla Province, and Suncheon-si in 2005, Gimhae, South Gyeongsang Province in 2006, and Pohang, North Gyeongsang Province in 2008 implemented high school standardization. In 2013, high school standardization was implemented in Gwangmyeong, Ansan, Uijeongbu and Gangneung, Gangwon Province. Chuncheon, Gangwon Province, Wonju, Gunsan, Iksan, Seongnam Province, and Mokpo, South Jeolla Province Province, have abolished and reintroduced the standardization system.

As of 2017, the government has adopted a high school equalization system in 36 regions across the country. Although the standardization system existed in the six metropolitan cities after the introduction of the standardization system, the Sejong Special Self-Governing City, where the central government administrative body was relocated, was introduced in 2017 as part of the resolution of non-preferred schools under the high school option system.

=== Korea High school standardization area ===
- Seoul Metropolitan Government: All Regions (1974)
- Busan Metropolitan City: Excluding Kijang-gun (1974)
- Daegu Metropolitan City: Excluding Dalseong-gun (1975)
- Gwangju Metropolitan City: All Regions (1975)
- Incheon Metropolitan City: All areas (1975) (High schools in Ganghwa-gun, Ongjin-gun, Jung-gu, Yeongjong-do, etc. are special district high schools, and therefore belong to non-standardization High School)
- Daejeon Metropolitan City: All Regions (1979)
- Ulsan Metropolitan City: All Regions (2000)
- Sejong Special Self-Governing City: All Regions (2017)
- Southern Gyeonggi Province: Suwon City (1979), Seongnam City (Sujeong-gu, Jungwon-gu (1980), Anyang City, Gwacheon City, Gunpo City, Uiwang City, Bucheon City, Seongnam City (2002), Gwangmyeong City, Ansan City (This year 2013 – Daebu High School is a special district high school, which corresponds to a non-standardized high school.) (In 2015, Baekam High School is a special district high school, so it is a non-standardized high school),
- Northern Gyeonggi Province: Goyang City (2002) Uijeongbu City (2013)
- Gangwon Province: Wonju (1980-1991/2013), Chuncheon (1979-1991/2013), Gangneung (2013)
- North Chungcheong Province: Cheongju City (1979)
- South Chungcheong Province: Cheonan City (1980-1995/2016)
- North Jeolla Province: Gunsan City (1980-1990/2000), Iksan City (1980-1991/2000), Jeonju City (1979)
- South Jeolla Province: Mokpo City (1980-1990/2005), Yeosu City (2005), Suncheon City (2005)
- North Gyeongsang Province: Pohang City (2008)
- South Gyeongsang Province: Gimhae City (2006), Masan City (currently Masan Hoewon-gu, Changwon City, Masan Happo-gu, Masan, 1879), Jinju City (1980), Changwon City (currently Seongsan-gu, Changwon City, Uichang-gu, 1980)
- Jeju Special Self-Governing Province: Jeju City (1979)

=== Areas where high school standardization policy is abolished ===
- North Gyeongsang Province: Andong (1980–1990)

== Prestigious high school ==
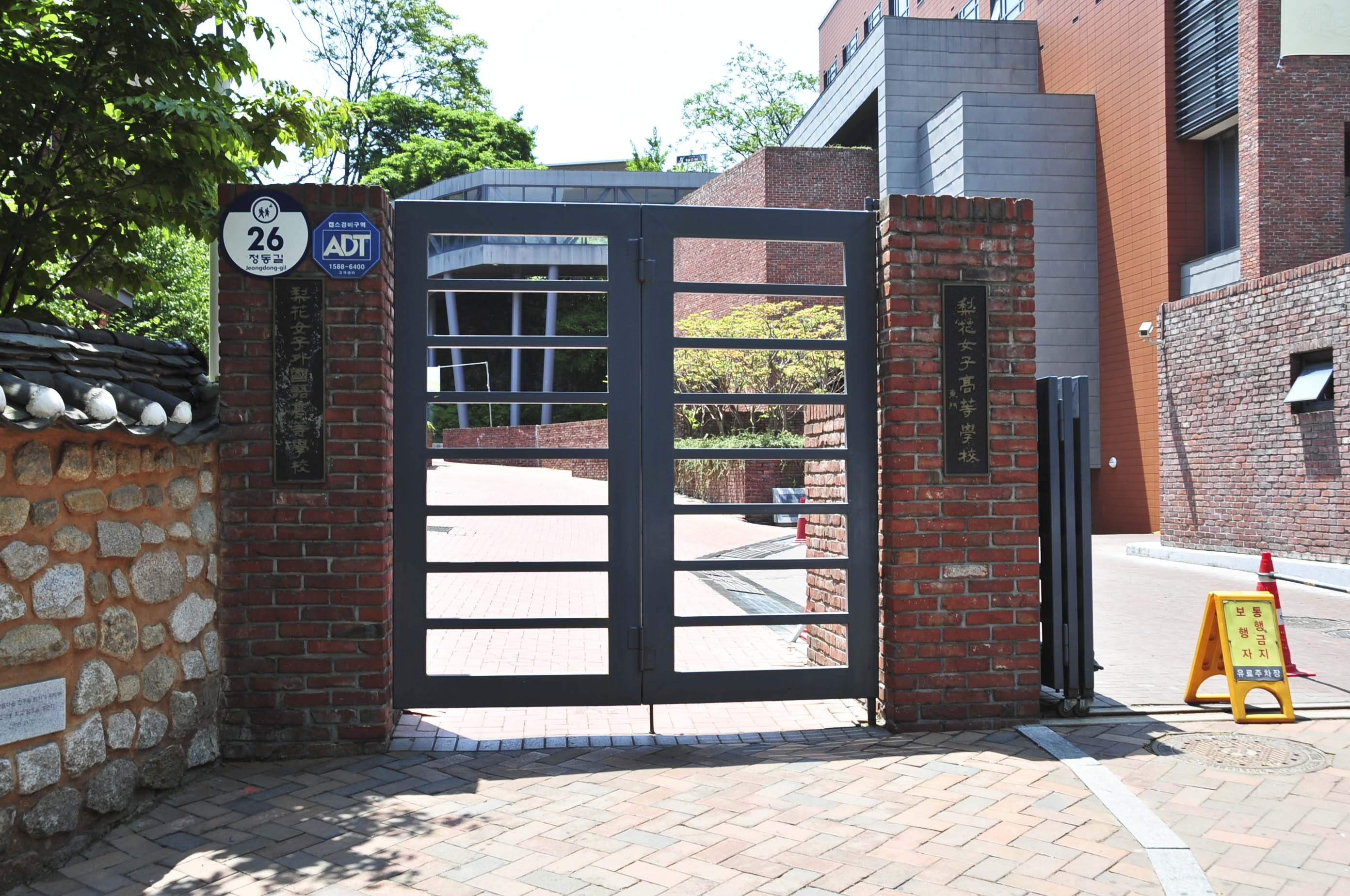
Ewha Girls' High School, Seoul, 2011.

=== Before high school standardization ===
In the metropolitan area, Gyeonggi, Seoul, Kyongbok, Yongsan and Gyeongdong high schools are the top five public high schools in Seoul. And the five most prestigious private schools are Choong-Ang High School, Hwimun High School, Bosung High School, Yangjeong High School, and Baejae High School. Some of the most prestigious female high schools are Gyeonggi Girls' High School and Changdeok Girls' High School in Gyeonggi Province, and Ewha Girls' High School, Sookmyung Women's High School and Mental Girls' High School in private schools. In non-capital areas, there were Busan High School in Busan, Gyeongnam High School in Daegu, Jemulpo High School in Incheon, Jeonju Junju, Gwangju Jeil High School and Daejeon High School in Daejeon.

=== After high school standardization ===
After high school standardization, Gyeonggi High School, which was formerly a prestigious high school, moved to Gangnam, and as a village of high-end apartments was formed in Gangnam, it was able to become a prestigious high school in the 8th class of Gangnam, although it was not up to its former reputation.

As the metropolis standardized. In the midst of the strength of the existing traditional areas, the newly established and prestigious areas also emerged. Suncheon and Pohang have stood out since their birth generations in the 1970s. Local elite high schools such as Suncheon High School and Pohang High School played the role of a tow truck. Entrance to a local prestigious school has become more difficult than entering a prestigious university. During the 2003 College Scholastic Ability Test, Seo Hyeon-go (351.5), Baekseok High School (349.4), Anyang High School (344.8), Gangneung High School (341.9), Bundang High School (336.5), Chuncheon High School (334.6), and Pohang High School (333.8) were among the highest in the nation. These schools have standardized.

== Evaluation and controversy ==
Among the advantages of the high school standardization policy are the environment in which students can overcome the sense of prestige and discrimination based on their own schools, ease the burden of college entrance exams, and provide a full-fledged education. Shortcoming points are the dumbing down of high school education, poor quality of education, loss of school tradition and lack of talent finding. The high school standardization virtually guarantees equal educational opportunities guaranteed by the Constitution. It is also claimed to be a social integration policy aimed at minimizing social discrimination due to education. The achievements of the high school standardization policy have also shown a distinctly divided tendency according to the trends of the media. The reasons for and against the high school standardization policy are outlined in the following table.

Advantages and disadvantages of the high school standardization policy
Advantages	Disadvantages
It can resolve the sense of hypocrisy and discrimination.; It can prevent students with poor family backgrounds from losing their potential.; All-round education will be possible by easing the burden of entrance exams.; Close the gap between high schools.; Contribute to the normalization of education; Ease of central government support and control of education courses.; Reduce the burden of private education.; There is no evidence of diminished academic background.	It is feared to be downgraded due to the effect of education.; It is an obstacle to the compilation of training courses by level/qualification.; The search for talent is insufficient.; The lack of autonomy in private schools leads to the loss of school-specific traditions.; The autonomy of education is not guaranteed, and efficiency is undermined.; There is still a gap between high schools.; Private education costs have increased, and the burden of studying remains.

Although there are claims that the policy of equalization of high schools is responsible for the spread of private education, increased private education costs, and collapse of public education, the causal relationship is uncertain. Some suggested solutions to these problems special purpose high schools, self-reliant private high schools, the expansion of alternative schools, and the granting of autonomy to private schools. Some say that the current education problem is not caused by the policy of equalizing high schools, but rather by the fact that the policy of equalizing high schools has not been implemented properly. Some pointed out that it should be an education that emphasizes cooperation, not competition. The claim that the social class will become entrenched due to the standardization of high schools has also become controversial. On the contrary, some say that equalization dilutes the effect of investing in education costs for children of the wealthy as the function of selecting students shifts to the senior age. It will extend the opportunity for students in relatively poor conditions to make up for their academic deficits with their individual efforts.

== Non-standardization high school ==
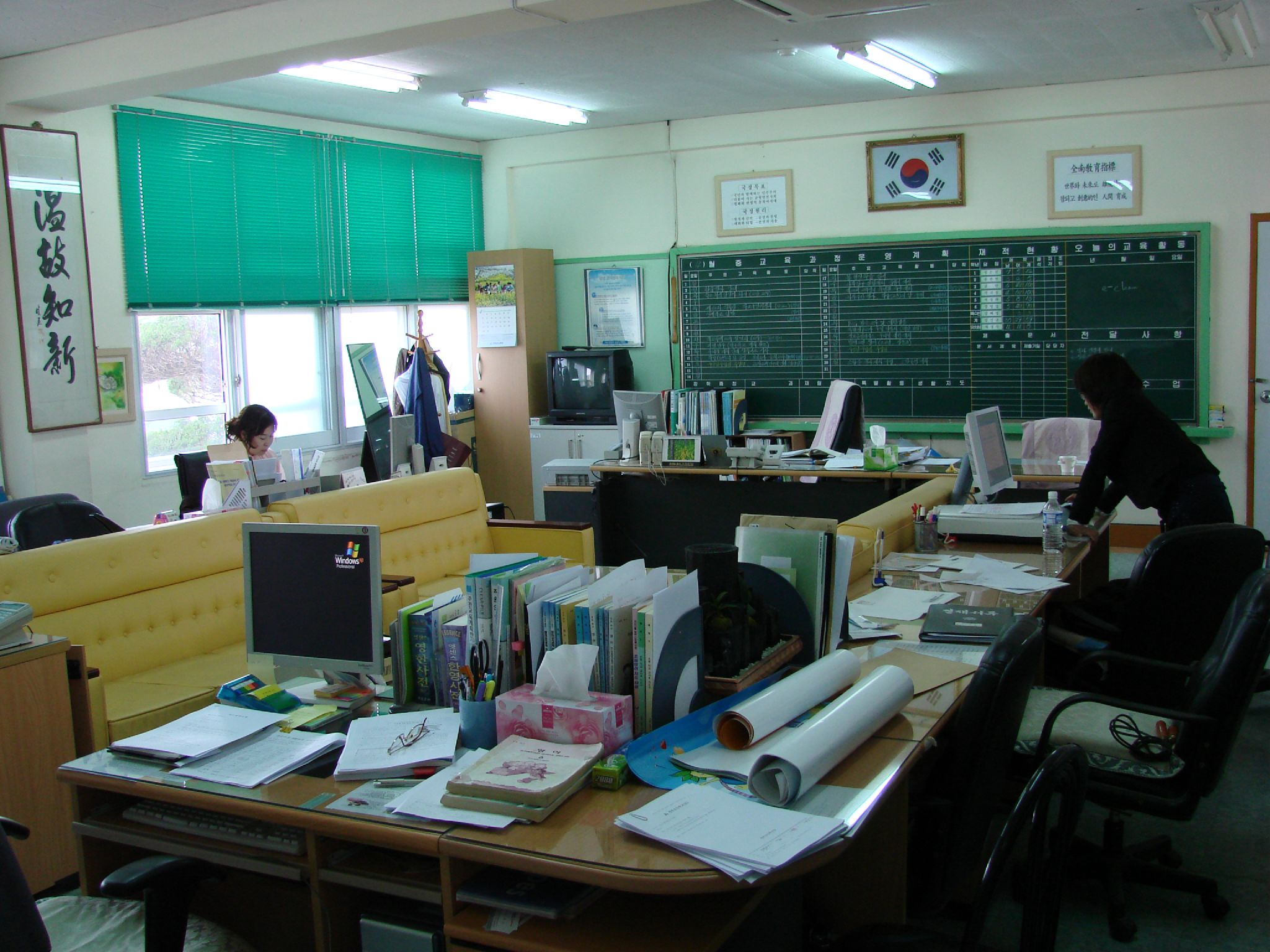
Inside the teacher's office at a country school near Suncheon, 2007.

Non-standardization high school was founded after high school standardization. Non-standardization high schools like autonomous private high school, are exceptionally recognized for their non-standardization areas for reasons such as distance to school and facilities conditions. Non-standardization high school are usually located in urban and rural areas or areas where transportation is inconvenient such as Ongjin-gun in Incheon, Yeongjong-do and Ganghwa-do. Seo In-cheon High School and Daein High School in Incheon are not computer drawers but direct selection of school principals. Therefore, it was lifted to Non-standardization high school from 1996 and changed to standardization local late high school based on the calculation lottery system. In addition, Mirim Girls' High School and Wuxin High School received approval to cancel autonomous private high school in 2015 from the Seoul Metropolitan Office of Education due to a lack of student recruitment and school management. It then switched to Standardization Late High School in 2016. However, in 2012 and 2013, Dongyang High School and Yongmun High School did not meet the quota of new students, so standardization local high school. Non-standardization high school, various conditions are not good. Meanwhile, education content and methods, support of the Board of Education are the same as in standardization high schools.

== Incidents of high school standardization policy ==
Incidents of High school standardization policy is an important example of the Republic of Korea's Constitution on the confirmation of unconstitutional Article 84 of the Enforcement Decree of the Elementary and Secondary Education Act.

=== Fact relevance ===
The claimant is a parent with a high school student and a middle school student who is scheduled to go to high school. The petitioner filed for a Constitutional Court ruling, claiming that it violates parents' right to choose schools, religious education and the right to pursue happiness. This is because Article 84 of the Enforcement Decree of the Elementary and Secondary Education Act, which stipulates the allocation of high school lottery, can be assigned to schools that block opportunities for the claimant's children to apply to schools of their choice and provide unwanted schools or religious education.

=== Conclusion ===
Constitutional, judge 6:3 opinion of the judge

=== Reason ===
Under Article 31 of the Constitution, the state has a wide-ranging right to form concerning school education, including the institution, organization, school type, educational objectives, content and methods of classes. Article 84 of the Enforcement Decree of the Elementary and Secondary Education Act will normalize middle school education by addressing overheated competition in high schools. Also, the purpose of legislation is justified as it is for equalization of high school education opportunities through reduction of school-to-school gaps and regional gaps. In addition, it is recognized that the method of admission by the superintendent, not the method of competition for admission by each school, and the method of allocation by lottery by school group is appropriate.

== Similar cases outside of Korea ==
Public schools in the United States, UK, and France are unique by region as students are assigned based on their residence, but the autonomy of educational councils in each school district is guaranteed. In addition, professional public schools are separately supported by the independent education tax of local residents, and are implementing regional education differentiation. Most private schools are known to be free to select students. In the UK, starting in 2008, admissions to prestigious public high schools have been announced to have a raffle system, rather than a residence priority.

In the case of Finland, schools can be supported regardless of where they live. Highly competitive public high schools have students' grades as the criterion for selection.

Japan has been standardized since 1968. But starting with Tokyo in 2003, a growing number of municipalities have abolished standardization. U-Tori education, which was conducted from 2002, was once considered positive for the curriculum. Currently, it is not implemented due to a decrease in basic education.

The U.S. No Child Left Behind Act is an education law that calls for improvement in schools where students' "improvement of their grades" falls short of standards through annual evaluations. In the UK, the evaluation grades of schools (League tables) are announced each year. The lack of high school principals was also a problem due to excessive work compared to authority. Some examples are the U.S. Child Left Behind and the U.K.'s school director responsibility system, which emphasizes school responsibilities for providing quality education.

== List of late high school in standardization area of South Korea ==
=== Capital Region ===
==== Seoul ====
School district Code	Administrative District	Gender (male/female)	Gender (Coed School)
1	Dongdaemun-gu / Junglang-gu	Dongguk Sadaengbugo (Male) / Myeonmog High School (Male) / Songko High School (Male) / Kyunghee Girls' High School / Song Gyok High School / HaeSung Girls' High School / Hwyung Girls' High School / HyeWon Girls' High School	Cheonglyang High School / Hwibong High School / Taeleung High School / Wonmug High School / Seoulsinhyeon High School / Junghwa High School
2	Mapo-gu / Seodaemun-gu / Eunpyeong-gu	Gyeongseong High School(Male) / Sungsil High School(Male) / Seoulgwangseong High School(Male) / Inchang High School(Male) / Chungam High School(Male) / Hanseong High School(Male) / Ddongmyeong Girls' High School / Seoul Art High School / Seouljungang Girls' High School / Seonil Girls' High School / Yeil Girls' High School / Hongig Sadaebu Girls' High School	Gajaeul High School / Myeongji High School / Jingwan High School / Sangam High School / Seonjeong High School / Sindo High School / Eunpyeong High School
3	Gulo-gu / Yeongdeunpo-gu / Geumcheon-gu	Munil High School(Male)/Yeouido High School(Male)/Usingo(Male)/Olyugo(Female)/Dongil Girls' High School/Yeouido Girls' High School/Yeongdeungpo Girls' High School	Gocheog High School / Gyeongin High School / Guil High School / Guhyeon High School / Gulo High School / Gwanag High School / Dogsan High School / Seoulgeumcheon High School / Seouldaeyeong High School / Seoulyeongsin High School /Seonyu High School / Sindolim High School
4	Dobong-gu / Nowon-gu	Daejin High School(Male) / Sanggye High School(Male) / Seolabeol High School(Male) / Jaehyeon High School(Male) / Cheongwon High School(Male) / Daejin Girls' High School / Yonghwa Girls' High School / Yeongsin Girls' High School / Cheongwon Girls' High School / Hyeseong Girls' High School	Nuwon High School / Dobong High School / Bulam High School/Sangmyeong High School / Sulag High School / Jaun High School / Yeomgwang High School / Wolgye High School / Changdong High School / Hyomun High School
5	Jung-gu / Jonglo-gu / Yongsan-gu	Gyeongsin High School(Male) / Gyeongbog High School(Male) / Daesin High School(Male) / Baemun High School(Male) / Seongdong High School(Male) / Yongsan High School(Male) / Osan High School(Male) / Jangchung High School(Male) / Hwanil High School(Male) / Deogseong Girls' High School / Boseong Girls' High School / Sangmyeongdaebu Girls' High School / Singwang Girls' High School / Seongsim Girls' High School	Junggyeong High School
6	Gangdong-gu / Songpa-gu	Dongbug High School(Male) / Boseong High School(Male) / Baemyeong High School(Male) / Jamsil High School(Male) / Myeongi Girls' High School / Jamsil Girls' High School / Sangil Girls' High School / Yeongpa Girls' High School / Jeongsin Girls' High School / Changdeog Girls' High School	Galag High School / Gangdong High School / Gwangmun High School / Gangil High School / Dunchon High School / Munjeong High School / Munhyeon High School / Bangsan High School / Seongdeog High School / Seonsa High School / Yeongdongil High School / Ogeum High School / Jamsin High School / Jamil High School / Hanyeong High School / Geoyeo High School(Will open in 2020)
7	Gangseo-gu / Yangcheon-gu	Gwangyeong High School (Male) / Dongyang High School (Male) / Mapo High School(Male) / Myeongdeog High School(Male) / Seoulgangseo High School (Male) / Yeongil High School (Male) / Yangcheon High School (Male) / Hwagog High School(Male) / Gwangyeong Girls' High School / Gyeongbog Girls' High School / Geumog Girls' High School / Deogwon Girls' High School / Myeongdeog Girls' High School / Nogdong High School (In the past, Yangcheon Girls' High School)/Jinmyeong Girls' High School	Deungchon High School / Baegam High School / Seoulgonghang High School / Sumyeong High School / Sinmog High School / Sinseo High School / Sehyeon High School / Hanseo High School
8	Gangnam-gu / Seocho-gu	Kyunggi High School(Male) / Dandaebusok High School(Male) / Sangmun High School(Male) / Seoul High School(Male) / Yeongdong High School(Male) / Jungsan High School(Male) / Kyunggi Girls' High School / Jinseon Girls' High School / Eungwang Girls' High School / Seomun Girls' High School / Dongdeog Girls' High School / Sugmyeong Girls' High School	Gaepo High School / Banpo High School / Seoulsejong High School / Seocho High School / Abgujeong High School / Yangjae High School / Jungdaebu High School / Eonnam High School / Cheongdam High School / Pungmun High School
9	Gwanag-gu / Dongjag-gu	Namgang High School(Male) / Seongnam High School(Male) / Seongbo High School(Male) / Yeongdeungpo High School(Male) / Milim Girls' High School / Sudo Girls' High School / Sungui Girls' High School / Seoul Munyeong Girls' High School	Guam High School / Gwangsin High School / Danggog High School / Dongjag High School / Samseong High School / Sinlim High School / Yeonglag High School / Inheon High School
10	Seongdong-gu / Gwangjin-gu	Deogsu High School(Male) / Daewon High School(Male) / Donggug Sadaebu Girls' High School / Daewon Girls' High School / Muhag Girls' High School	Geondaebu High School / Gwangnam High School / Seongsu High School / Seoulgwangyang High School / Seoulgyeongil High School / Jayang High School / Doseon High School / Geumho High School
11	Seongbug-gu / Gangbug-gu	Godaebu High School(Male) / Hongig Sadaebu High School(Male) / Gyeongdong High School(Male) / Yongmun High School(Male) / Seoulhyehwa Girls' High School / Seongsin Girls' High School / Changmun Girls' High School / Hanseong Girls' High School	Miyang High School / Samgagsan High School / Seoul Sadaebu High School / Seoul Gyeseong High School / Seoggwan High School / Yeonghun High School

==== Incheon ====
School district	Administrative District	Gender (male/female)	Gender (Coed School)
1,2,3 Union School District	Jung-gu / Dong-gu / Michuhol-gu / Namdong-gu / Yeonsugu / Bupyeong-gu / Gyeyang-gu / Seo-gu /etc. All Incheon Areas	Incheon High School(Male) / Incheonnam High School(Male) / Jemulpo High School(Male) / Seogjeong Girls' High School	–
1,2 Union School District	Jung-gu / Dong-gu / Michuhol-gu / Namdong-gu / Yeonsu-gu / Bupyeong-gu / Gyeyang-gu / etc. Some Areas	Incheonjeilgo(Male) / Sinmyeong Girls' High School	–
1	Jung-gu / Dong-gu / Michuholgu / Namdong-gu / Yeonsu-gu	Namdong High School(Male) / Dolim High School(Male) / Dong-incheon High School(Male) / Mansu High School(Male) / Songdo High School(Male) / Songcheon High School(Male) / Seonin High School(Male) / Sinsong High School(Male) / Yeonsu High School(Male) / Yeonsong High School(Male) / Inje High School(Male) / Incheon Daegeon High School(Male) / Inha Sadaebu High School(Male) / Inhang High School(Male) / Incheon Gwangseong High School(Male) / Incheon Dongsan High School(Male) / Hagig High School(Male) / Munil Girls' High School / Bagmun Girls' High School / Sungdeog Girls' High School / Oglyeon Girls' High School / Yeonsu Girls' High School / Inmyeong Girls' High School / Incheon Girls' High School / Inil Girls' High School / Inhwa Girls' High School / Hagig Girls' High School / Incheongojan High School(Female) / Incheonhaesong High School(Female) / Incheonnonhyeon High School(Female)	–
2	Bupyeong-gu / Gyeyang-gu	Gyesan High School(Male) / Gyeyang High School(Male) / Bugwang High School(Male) / Bupyeong High School(Male) / Sangjeong High School(Male) / Jagjeon High School(Male) / Gyesan Girls' High School / Bugae Girls' High School / Bugwang Girls' High School / Bupyeong Girls' High School / Jagjeon Girls' High School / Incheon Sewon High School(Female)	Bugae High School / Seoun High School / Sangog High School / Samsan High School / Annam High School / Incheon Buheung High School / Incheon Yeil High School / Yeongseon High School / Incheon Hyoseong High School
2,3 Union School District	Bupyeong-gu / Gyeyang-gu / Seo-gu	Seil High School(Male) / Myeongsin Girls' High School	Incheon Gajwa High School
3	Seo-gu	Daein High School(Male) / Majeon High School(Male) / Cheongla High School(Male) / Geomdan High School(Female) / Sinhyeon High School(Female) / Choeun High School(Female)	Galim High School / Gajeong High School / Seoincheon High School / Incheon Baegseog High School / Wondang High School / Haewon High School

==== Gyeonggi Province ====
School district	District 1	District 2	District 3	District 4
Suwon	Suwon Buk-bu (Kwonseon/Jangan-gu) : Dongwon High School (male), Suseong High School (male), Dongwoo Girls' High School, Yeongbok Girls' High School, Daepyeong High School (Coed School), Suwon Chilbogo (Coed School), Suil High School (Coed School), Sukji High School (Coed School), Yeongsaeng High School (Coed School), Yulcheon High School (Coed School), Jowon High School (Coed School), Cheoncheon High School (Coed School), Homesil High School (Coed School)	Suwon Nam-bu (Kwonseon/Paldal/Yeongtong-gu) : Gosaeg High School (male), Suwon High School (male), Yusin High School (male), Suwon Girls' High School, Youngshin Girls' High School, Gokjeong High School (Coed School), Gwanggyo High School (Coed School), Kwonseon High School (Coed School), Mangpo High School (Coed School), Maewon High School (Coed School), Maetan High School (Coed School), Yeongdeok High School (Coed School), Iui High School (Coed School), Changhyeon High School (Coed School), Taejang High School (Coed School), Hwahong High School(Coed School), Hyowon High School(Coed School)	–	–
Seongnam	Sujeong/Jungwon-gu: Seongnam Seo High School (male), Sungil High School (male), Pungsaeng High School (male), Seongnam Girl's High School, Sungshin Girls' High School, Dongkwang High School (Coed School), Bokjeong High School (Coed School), Seongnam Hyoseong High School (Coed School)	Bundang-gu: Naksaeng High School, Neulpureun High School, Dolma High School, Bundang High School, Bundang Daejin High School, Bundang Joongang High School, Bulgok High School, Sampyong High School, Seohyun High School, Sunae High School, Songrim High School, Yatap High School, Imae High School, Taewon High School, Hansol High School, Bopyeong High School, Unjung High School, Bundang Yeongduk Girls' High School	-	-
Anyang	Manan/Dongan-gu: Sinseong High School (male), Yangmyeong High School (male), Anyang Girls' High School, Yangmyeong Girl's High School, Gwanyang High School (Coed School), Dongan High School (Coed School), Baekyoung High School (Coed School), Sungmun High School (Coed School), Anyang High School (Coed School), Anyang Buheung High School (Coed School), Indeokwon High School (Coed School), Chunghoon High School (Coed School), Pyeongchon High School (Coed School)	Gwacheon: Gwacheon High School (Coed School), Gwacheon Girls' High School, Gwacheon Jungang High School (Coed School)	Gunpo: Gunpo High School, Bugok Jungang High School, Sanbon High School, Suri High School, Yongho High School, Heungjin High School	Uiwang: Useong High School, Baegun High School, Morak High School, and Uiwang High School (Get a separate recruitment first)
Goyang	Deokyang-gu: Goyang Dongsan High School, Goyang Il High School, Neunggok High School, Doraeul High School, Muwon High School, Baekyang High School, Seojeong High School, Seongsa High School, Haengsin High School, Hwaseu High School, Hwajeong High School	Ilsan-dong/Seogu : Daehwa High School, Deokgo High School, Baekma High School, Baeksin High School, Sewon High School, Angok High School, Ilsan Gajwa High School, Ilsan Daejin High School, Ilsan Dong High School, Ilsan Baekseok High School, Jeodong High School, Jehyeon High School. Jeongbal High School, Juyeop High School, Jungsan High School, Pungdong High School	-	-
Bucheon	Sosa/Wonmi/Ohjung-gu: Bucheon High School (male), Bucheon Girls' High School, Somyeong Girls' High School, Gyenam High School (Coed School), Deoksan High School (Coed School), Dodang High School (Coed School), Beombak High School (Coed School), Bumyeong High School (Coed School), Bucheon Buk High School (Coed School), Sangdong High School (Coed School), Sanwon High School (Coed School), Sangil High School (Coed School), Sosa High School (Coed School), Songnae High School (Coed School), Sujou High School ( Coed School), Sion High School (Coed School), Simwon High School (Coed School), Yeokgok High School (Coed School), Wonmi High School (Coed School), Wonjong High School (Coed School), Jungmyung High School (Coed School), Jungwon High School (Coed School), Jungheoung High School (Coed School)	-	-	-
Gwangmyeong	Gwangmyeong High School, Gwangmyeong Buk High School, Gwangmun High School, Gwanghwi High School, Myeongmun high school, Soha High School, Unsan High School, Jinseong High School, Chunghyeon High School	-	-	-
Ansan	Danwon-gu: Danwon High School, Seonbu High School, Shingil High School, Ansan Gangseo High School, Yangji High School, Wongok High School, Choji High School	Sangnok-gu: Gyeongan High School, Gojan High School, Gwangdeok High School, Sangnok High School, Seongan High School, Seongpo High School, Songho High School, Ansan Bugok High School	-	-
Uijeongbu	Uijeongbu High School (male), Yeongseok High School (male), Uijeongbu Girls' High School, Gyeongmin High School (Coed School), Balgok High School (Coed School), Buyong High School (Coed School), Sangwoo High School (Coed School), Songhyeon High School (Coed School), Songyang High School (Coed School), Uijeongbu Kwangdong High School (Coed School), Howon High School (Coed School), Hyoja High School (Coed School)	-	-	-
Yongin	Giheung-gu: Guseong High School, Giheung High School, Dongbaek High School, Bora High School, Seocheon High School, Shingal High School, Yongin Baekhyun High School, Yongin Seongji High School, Cheongdeok High School, Chodang High School, Heungdeok High School	Suji-gu: Daeji High School, Sanghyeon High School, Seowon High School, Seongbok High School, Suji High School, Sinbong High School, Jukjeon High School, Pungdeok High School, Hyunam High School, Hongcheon High School	Cheoin-gu: Gorim High School, Samgye High School, Yongin High School, Taeseong High School (male), Pogok High School	-

=== The Southeast Region ===
==== Busan ====
School district	Administrative District	Gender (male/female)	Gender (Coed School)
Seo-bu	Jung-gu, Seo-gu, Saha-gu, Yeongdo-gu, and part of Gangseo-gu (Myongji, Noksan, Chunga-dong)	Konkuk High School (male), Gyeongnam High School (male), Gwangmyeong High School (male), Daedong High School (male), Dong-A High School (male), Busan Man's High School, Haedong High School (male), Hyegwang High School (male), Namsung Girls' High School, Busan Seo Girls' High School, Busan Girls' High School, Samsung Girls' High School, Sungil Girls' High School, Youngdo Girls' High School	Daedae High School, Myeongho High School, Pukyong High School
Nam-bu	Nam-bu, Dong-gu, Busanjin-gu	Gaegeum High School (male), Geumseong High School (male), Daeyeon High School (male), Dongcheon High School (male), Baejung High School (male), Busan High School (male), Busandong High School (male), Busan Dongsung High School (male), Busan Yangjeong High School (male), Busan Jungang High School (male), Busan Jin High School (male), Gyeongnam Girls' High School, Teresa Girls' High School, Munhyeon Girls' High School, Busan Sungmo Women's High School, Busan Jin Girls' High School, and Ye Moon Girls' High School	Gaya High School, Gaesong High School, Kyungwon High School, Bunpo High School
Buk-bu	Buk-gu, Sasang-gu, and part of Gangseo-gu (Daegyo-dong, Gangdong-dong, Garak-dong)	Gudeok High School (male), Sasang High School (male), Seongdo High School (male), Gyeonghye Girl's High School, Geummyeong Girls' High School, Daedeok Girls' High School, Jurye Girls' High School	Geumgok High School, Nakdong High School, Mandeok High School, Busan Gangseo High School, Busan Baekyang High School, Hwamyeong High School
Dongrae	Yeonje-gu, Dongrae-gu, Geumjeong-gu, part of Haeundae-gu (Banyeo, Seokdae, Bansong-dong), and part of Gyesang-gun (Jeungwan-myeon, Chulma-myeon)	Geumjeong High School (male), Naeseong High School (male), Dongnae High School (male), Dongin High School (male), Beniel High School (male), Yongin High School (male), Jisan High School (male), Chungnyeol High School (male), Geumjeong Girls' High School, Daemyung Girls' High School, Dongnae Girls' High School, Busan Haehwa Girls' High School, Busan Joongang Girl's High School, Beniel Girl's High School, Sajik Girls' High School, Haksan Girls' High School	Banyeo High School, Busan Namsan High School, Busan University High School, Sajik High School, Yeonje High School, Isabelle High School, Shin Jeong High School, Jeonggwan High School
Haeundae	Suyu-gu, part of Haeundae-gu (Woo, Joong, Jwa, Songjeong-dong), part of Gyujang-gun (Gijang-eup, Jangan-eup, Ilgwang-myeon)	Busan Namil High School (male), Centum High School (male), Deokmoon Girls' High School, Busan Dong Girls' High School, Haeundae Girls' High School	Kijang High School, Busan Buheung High School, Busan Sindo High School, Yangwoon High School, Haegang High School

=== Daegu–Gyeongbuk ===
==== Daegu ====
School district	Administrative District	Gender (male/female)	Gender (Coed School)
1	Jung-gu/Dong-gu/Buk-gu/Su-Sung-gu	Gangbuk High School (male)/Gyeonsang High School (male)/Sungguang High School (male)/Yeongjin High School (male)/Jungdong High School (male)/Chunggu High School (male)/Chilsung High School (male)/Gyeonmyeong Girl's High School/Gyeongbuk Girl's High School/Gyeongsang Girls' High School/Daegu Hyehwa Girls' High School/Sunghwa Girl's High School/Yeongsong Girls' High School/Jeonghwa Girl's High School/Daegu Suseong High School (female)	Kyungbook National University High School/Maecheon High School/Dukwon High School/Daegu GangDong High School/Daegu Guamgo High School/Daegu Namsan High School/Daegu Dongbu High School/Daegu Yeongsin High School/Dongmun High School/Siji High School/Unam High School/Haknam High School/Hamji High School
2	Nam-gu / Dalseo-gu / Seo-gu / Dalseong-gun (Hwawon-eup)	Kyungwon High School (male)/Dalsung High School (male)/Daegu High School (male)/Simin High School (male)/Yungnam High School (male)/Hyupsung High School (male)/Kyungduk Girl's High School/Kyunghwa Girl's High School/Songhyun Girl's High School/Wonhwa Girl's High School/Hyosung Girl's High School	Daegu Daejin High School/Daegu Daewon High School/Daegu Seobu High School/Daegu Sangwon High School/Daegu Jail High School/Daegok High School/Doewon High School/Sangin High School/Sungseo High School/Sungsan High School/Sinmyeong High School/Waryong High School/Hosan High School/Hwawon High School

=== Hoseo ===
==== Daejeon ====
Gender (male)	Gender (female)	Gender (Coed School)
Namdaejeon High School, Daejeon Dongsan High School, Daejeon Jungang High School, Myeongseok High School, Bomun High School, Seodaemun High School, Seoil High School, Yuseong High School	Dungsan Girls' High School, Daejeon Seongmo Girl's High School, Seoil Girls' High School, Yuseong Girls' High School, Cheongran Girls' High School, Chungnam Girls' High School, and Hosudon Girls' High School	Gao High School, Gubong High School, Goegjeong High School, Gwanjeo High School, Noeun High School, Daejeon Daeduk High School, Daejeon Boksu High School, Daejeon Imun High School, Daejeon Yongsan High School, Daejeon Jaeil High School, Daejeon Hanbit High School, Doan High School, Doonwon High School, Dongdaejeon High School, Dongbang High School, Mannyeon High School, Banseok High School, Sintanjin High School, Songchon High School, Woosong High School, Jungil High School, Jijok High School, Jeonmin High School, Hanbat High School

==== Sejong City ====
Name of School
Sejong High School (male), Sejong Sungnam High School, Sejong Girls' High School, Hansol High School, Dodam High School, Areum High School, Goun High School, Yangji High School, Jongchon High School
