= Daeyeon station =

Subway station in Busan, South Korea

Coordinates: 35.1351°N 129.0920°E

213 대연 (부산고려병원) Daeyeon (Busan Korea Hospital)
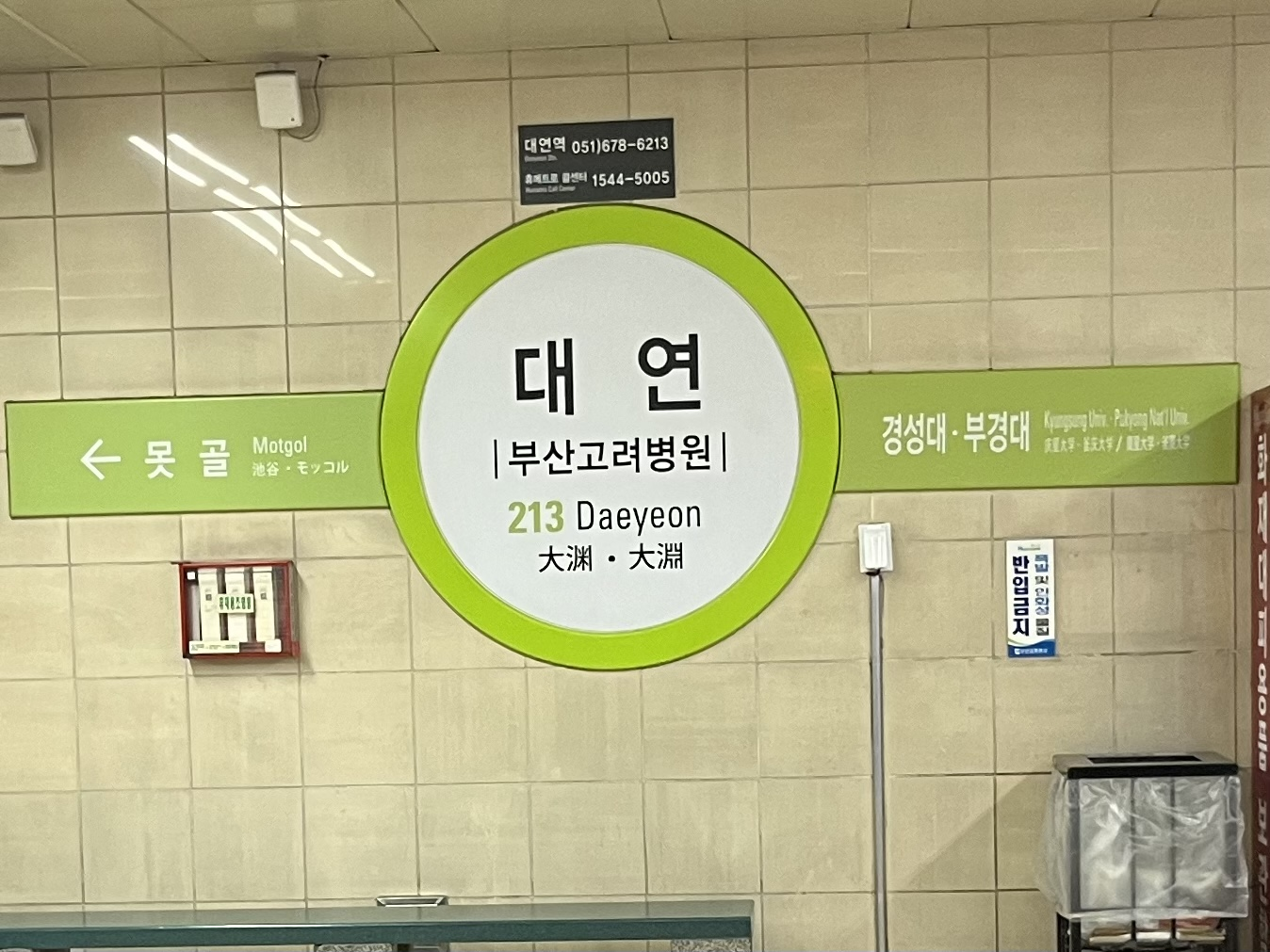

Korean name
- Hangul: 대연역
- Hanja: 大淵驛
- Revised Romanization: Daeyeon-yeok
- McCune–Reischauer: Taeyŏn-yŏk

General information
- Location: Daeyeon-dong, Nam District, Busan; South Korea
- Operator: Busan Transportation Corporation
- Line: Busan Metro Line 2
- Platforms: 2
- Tracks: 2

Construction
- Structure type: Underground

Other information
- Station code: 213

History
- Opened: August 8, 2001; 25 years ago
Location

Daeyeon Station (Korean: 대연역) is a station on the Busan Metro Line 2 in Daeyeon-dong, Nam District, Busan, South Korea.

Preceding station	Busan Metro	Following station
Kyungsung University–Pukyong National University towards Jangsan	Line 2	Motgol towards Yangsan
