= Kyungsung University–Pukyong National University station =

Station of the Busan Metro

Coordinates: 35.1376°N 129.1010°E

212 경성대·부경대 (동명대학교) Kyungsung Univ.·Pukyong Nat'l Univ. (Tongmyong Univ.)
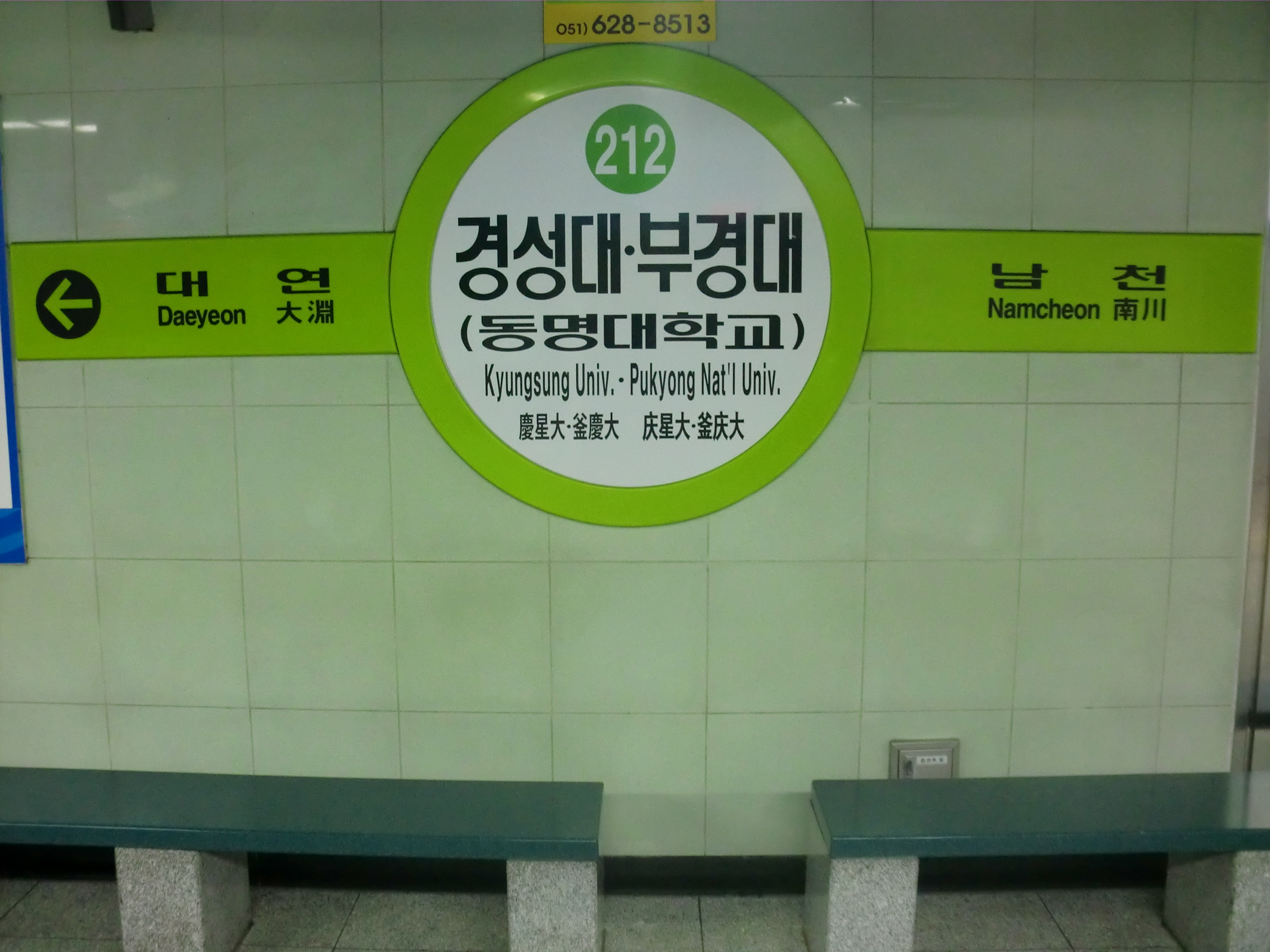

Korean name
- Hangul: 경성대·부경대역
- Hanja: 慶星大·釜慶大驛
- RR: Gyeongseongdae·Bugyeongdae-yeok
- MR: Kyŏngsŏngdae·Pugyŏngdae-yŏk

General information
- Location: Daeyeon-dong, Nam District, Busan; South Korea
- Operator: Busan Transportation Corporation
- Line: Busan Metro Line 2
- Platforms: 2
- Tracks: 2

Construction
- Structure type: Underground

Other information
- Station code: 212

History
- Opened: August 8, 2001; 25 years ago
Location

Kyungsung Univ. · Pukyong Nat'l Univ. Station (Korean: 경성대·부경대역) is a station on the Busan Metro Line 2 in Daeyeon-dong, Nam District, Busan, South Korea.

Preceding station	Busan Metro	Following station
Namcheon towards Jangsan	Line 2	Daeyeon towards Yangsan
