= Jigegol station =

Station of the Busan Metro

215 지게골 Jigegol
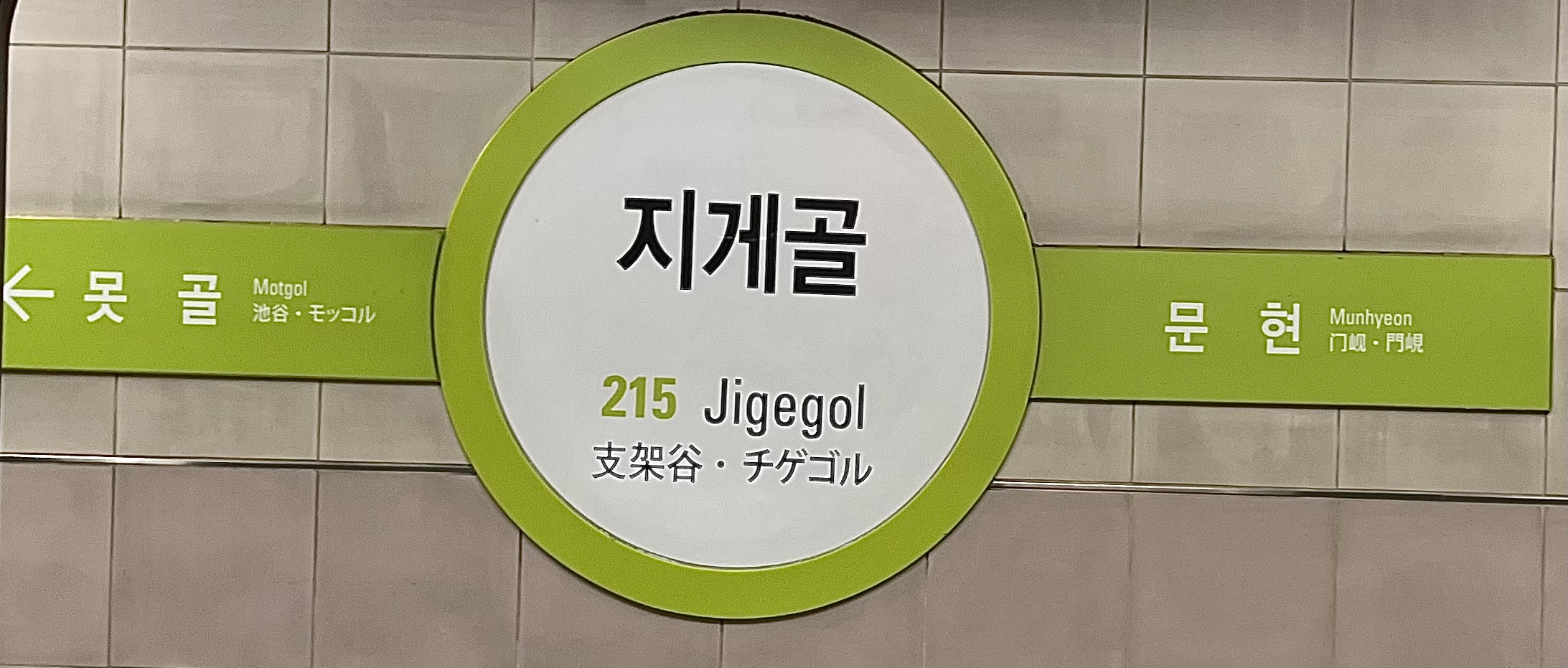

Korean name
- Hangul: 지게골역
- Hanja: 지게골驛
- Revised Romanization: Jigegol-yeok
- McCune–Reischauer: Chigegol-yŏk

General information
- Location: Munhyeon-dong, Nam District, Busan; South Korea
- Coordinates: 35.1357°N 129.0742°E
- Operator: Busan Transportation Corporation
- Line: Busan Metro Line 2
- Platforms: 2
- Tracks: 2

Construction
- Structure type: Underground

Other information
- Station code: 215

History
- Opened: August 8, 2001; 25 years ago
Location

Jigegol Station (Korean: 지게골역) is a station on the Busan Metro Line 2 in Munhyeon-dong, Nam District, Busan, South Korea.

Preceding station	Busan Metro	Following station
Motgol towards Jangsan	Line 2	Munhyeon towards Yangsan
