= Motgol station =

Metro station in Busan, South Korea

214 못골 (남구청) Motgol (Nam-gu Office)
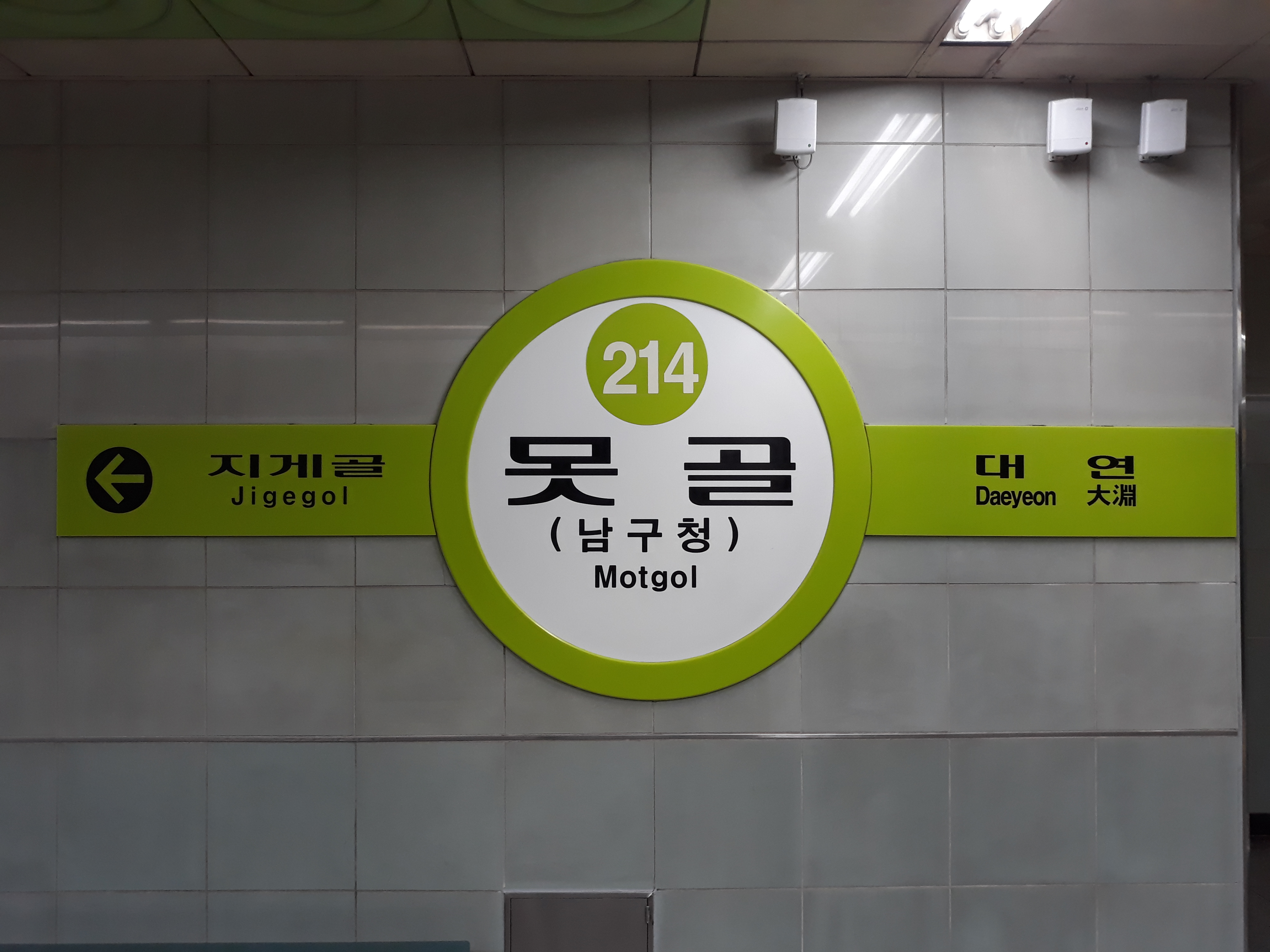

Korean name
- Hangul: 못골역
- Hanja: 못골驛
- Revised Romanization: Motgol yeok
- McCune–Reischauer: Motkol yŏk

General information
- Location: Daeyeon-dong, Nam District, Busan; South Korea
- Coordinates: 35.1348°N 129.0848°E
- Operator: Busan Transportation Corporation
- Line: Busan Metro Line 2
- Platforms: 2
- Tracks: 2

Construction
- Structure type: Underground

Other information
- Station code: 214

History
- Opened: August 8, 2001; 25 years ago
Location

Motgol Station (Korean: 못골역) is a station on the Busan Metro Line 2 in Daeyeon-dong, Nam District, Busan, South Korea.

Preceding station	Busan Metro	Following station
Daeyeon towards Jangsan	Line 2	Jigegol towards Yangsan
