= Namcheon station =

Station of the Busan Metro

211 남천 (KBS·수영구청) Namcheon (KBS·Suyeong-gu Office)
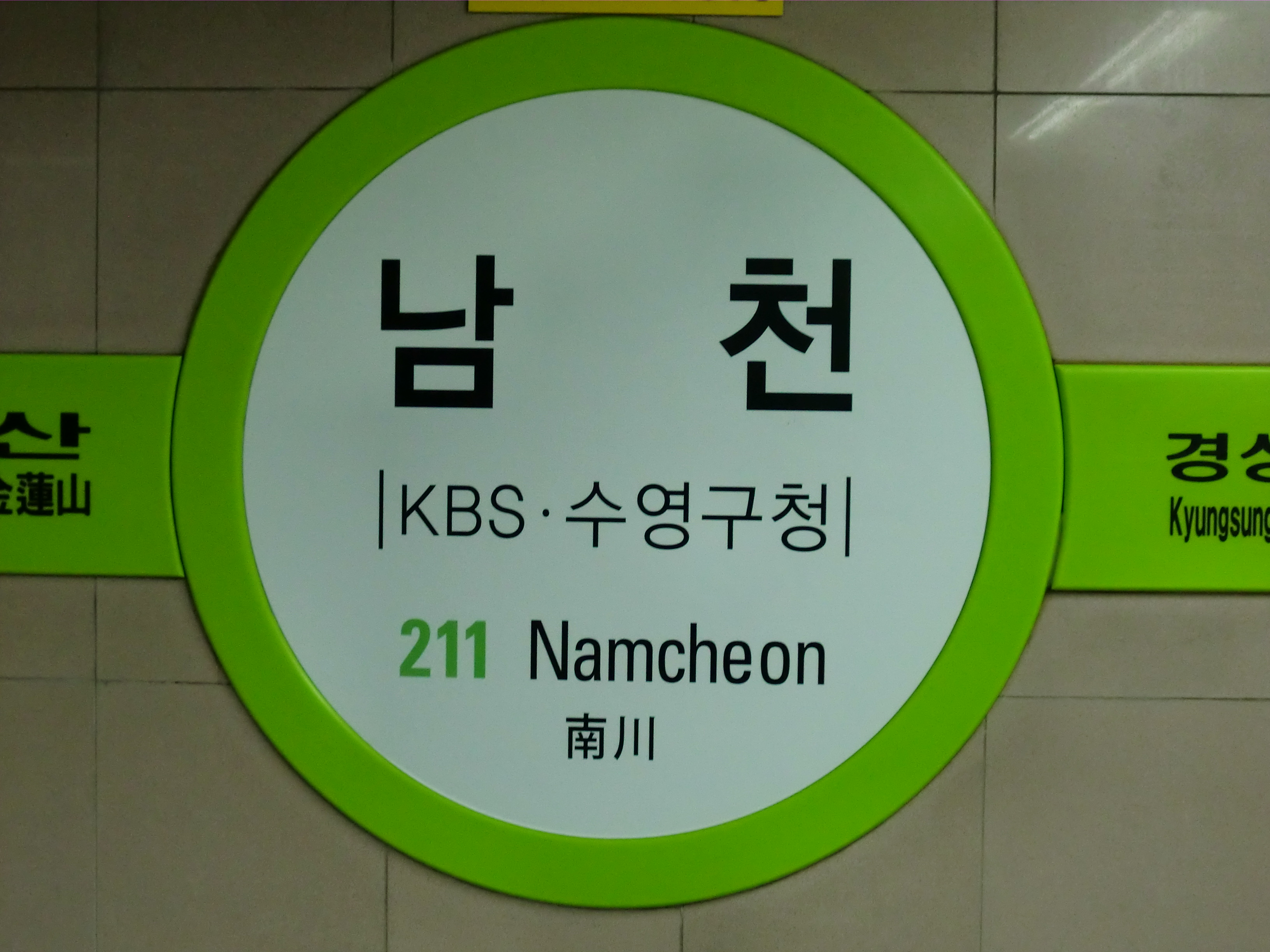

Korean name
- Hangul: 남천역
- Hanja: 南川驛
- Revised Romanization: Namcheon yeok
- McCune–Reischauer: Namch'ŏn yŏk

General information
- Location: Namcheon-dong, Suyeong District, Busan; South Korea
- Coordinates: 35.1420°N 129.1078°E
- Operator: Busan Transportation Corporation
- Line: Busan Metro Line 2
- Platforms: 2
- Tracks: 2

Construction
- Structure type: Underground

Other information
- Station code: 211

History
- Opened: August 8, 2001; 25 years ago
Location

Namcheon Station (Korean: 남천역; Hanja: 南川驛) is a station on the Busan Metro Line 2 in Namcheon-dong, Suyeong District, Busan, South Korea.

Preceding station	Busan Metro	Following station
Geumnyeonsan towards Jangsan	Line 2	Kyungsung University–Pukyong National University towards Yangsan
