= Daeyeon High School =

Public high school in Nam-gu, Busan, South Korea

Daeyeon High School 대연고등학교

Location
- Nam-gu, Busan Metropolitan City, Busan Metropolitan City; South Korea; 35°07′42″N 129°06′06″E

Information
- Type: Normal
- Motto: Great ambition and sincerity
- Established: 1988
- Principal: Kim Young Do (김영도)
- Enrollment: approx. 1022
- Website: www.daeyeon.hs.kr

- Daeyeon High School
- Hangul: 대연고등학교
- Hanja: 大淵高等學校
- RR: Daeyeon godeunghakgyo
- MR: Taeyŏn kodŭnghakkyo

Daeyeon High School is a high school in Nam-gu, Busan Metropolitan City, South Korea. It was established in 1988. The current principal is Kim Young Do (김영도). The school was established by edict of Yang Yong-chi on April 29, 1986, and opened its doors on March 5, 1988.

== See also ==
- Education in South Korea
