= Jeong Ju-hu =

South Korean baseball player

- Infielder
- Born: June 26, 1995 (age 30); Gwangju, South Korea
- Batted: left Threw: Right

KBO debut
- 2015, for the KT Wiz

Last KBO appearance
- Sept. 13, 2017, for the KT Wiz

KBO statistics
- Batting average: .000
- Home runs: 0
- Runs batted in: 0

- Jeong Ju-hu
- Hangul: 정주후
- RR: Jeong Juhu
- MR: Chŏng Chuhu

Jeong Ju-hu (Korean: 정주후; born June 26, 1995) is a South Korean professional baseball infielder. The name before renaming is "Chung Joo-hoo". His older brother is Jeong Keun-woon (정경운), an infielder on the Hanwha Eagles. He graduated from Gwangju Jeil High School.
