= Kyungsung University =

University in Busan, South Korea

Coordinates: 35.1398°N 129.0985°E

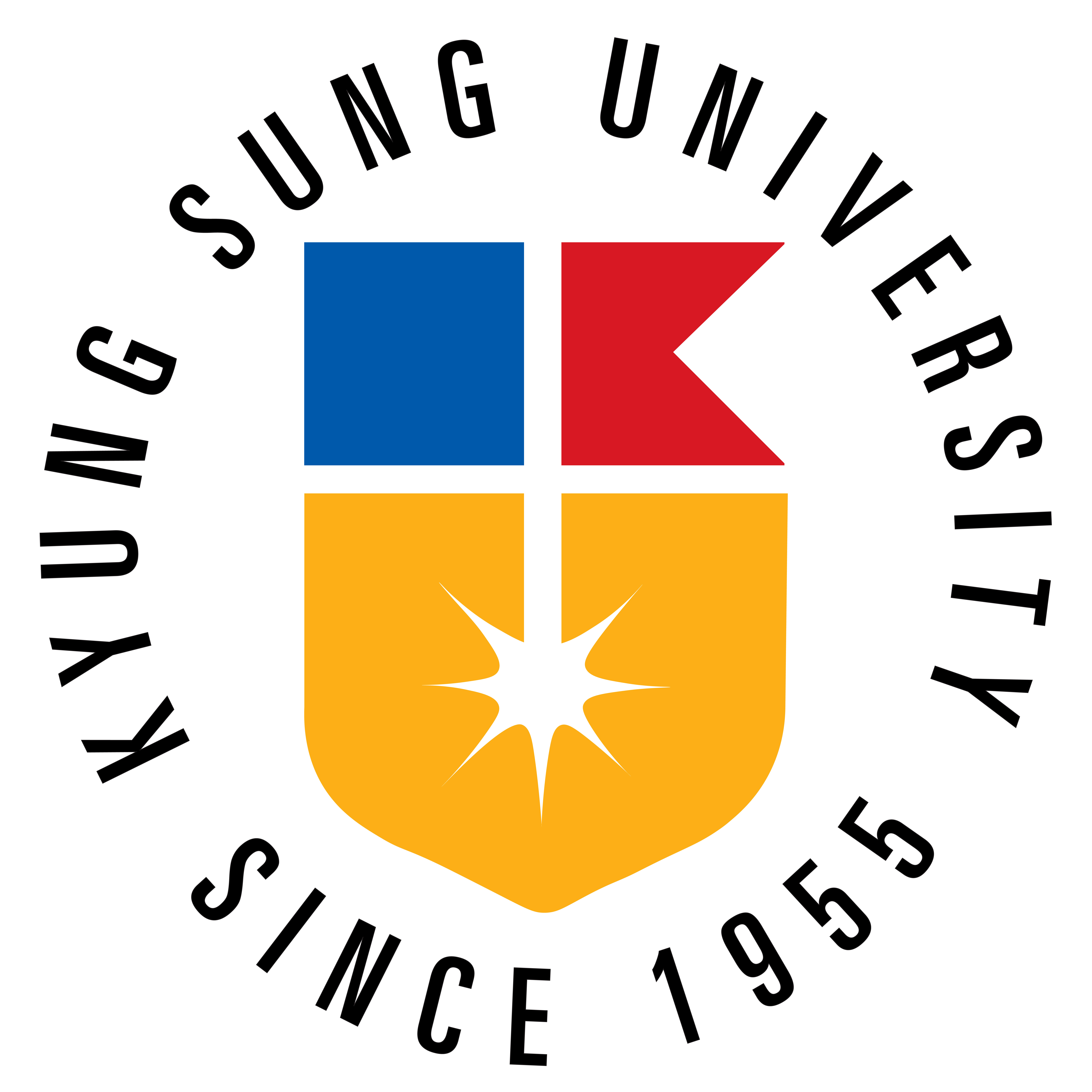
- Motto: Truth, Service, Free
- Type: Private
- Established: 1955
- Students: 16,486
- Location: Sooyoungryo 309, (Daeyeon 3Dong 314-79), Nam-gu district, Busan, South Korea
- Website: ks.ac.kr

Korean name
- Hangul: 경성대학교
- Hanja: 慶星大學校
- RR: Gyeongseong daehakgyo
- MR: Kyŏngsŏng taehakkyo

Kyungsung University (Korean: 경성대학교) is a private university in Busan, South Korea. It is located in the district of Nam-gu, southwest of the famous Haeundae beach. The campus is located near Kyungsung University-Pukyong National University Station on Line 2.

The university was established by the late Reverend Dr. Kim Gil-Chang, a pioneer of Christianity in Korea. The university was originally called Kyungnam Teacher's College and established in 1955 under the ideals of Christian love and service, In 1979 the school was re-organized and renamed Pusan Industrial University. At the time of the founding of Pusan Industrial University, the General Construction Committee began work on expanding and improving the quality of the university's facilities. As a result, the university received official sanctioning as a general university in September, 1983.

The name of the university was changed to Kyungsung University in 1988 during the process of becoming an international university which can fulfill the needs of today's society.

The university has 10 undergraduate colleges (Liberal Arts, Law and Politics, Commerce and Economics, Science, Engineering, Pharmacy, Arts, Theology, Multimedia, and Chinese) encompassing 7 different faculties and 54 departments at the time of 2011. There are seven graduate schools (General, International Management, Multimedia, Education, Social Welfare, Clinical Pharmacy, and Digital Design). In addition, seven affiliated organizations and seven affiliated research institutes have been established to aid teaching and research. Kyungsung University's 700 employees and over 13,000 students are all working together to achieve the school's educational goals.

Since 2002, the university has held a regional conference between South Korea and China regarding sustainable development of the Northeast Asia region.

The Kyungsung University Museum has been involved in the excavation of important regional archaeological sites. In the 1990s, the university museum was responsible for excavating the Daeseong-dong site, a protohistoric cemetery Gimhae with high-status burials from the Proto–Three Kingdoms period.

== Notable alumni ==
- Cho Jae-hyun, actor
- Cho Jin-woong, actor
- Kim Hyun-sook, actress
- Kim Jung-tae, actor
