= Oryukdo =

Group of islands in Busan, South Korea

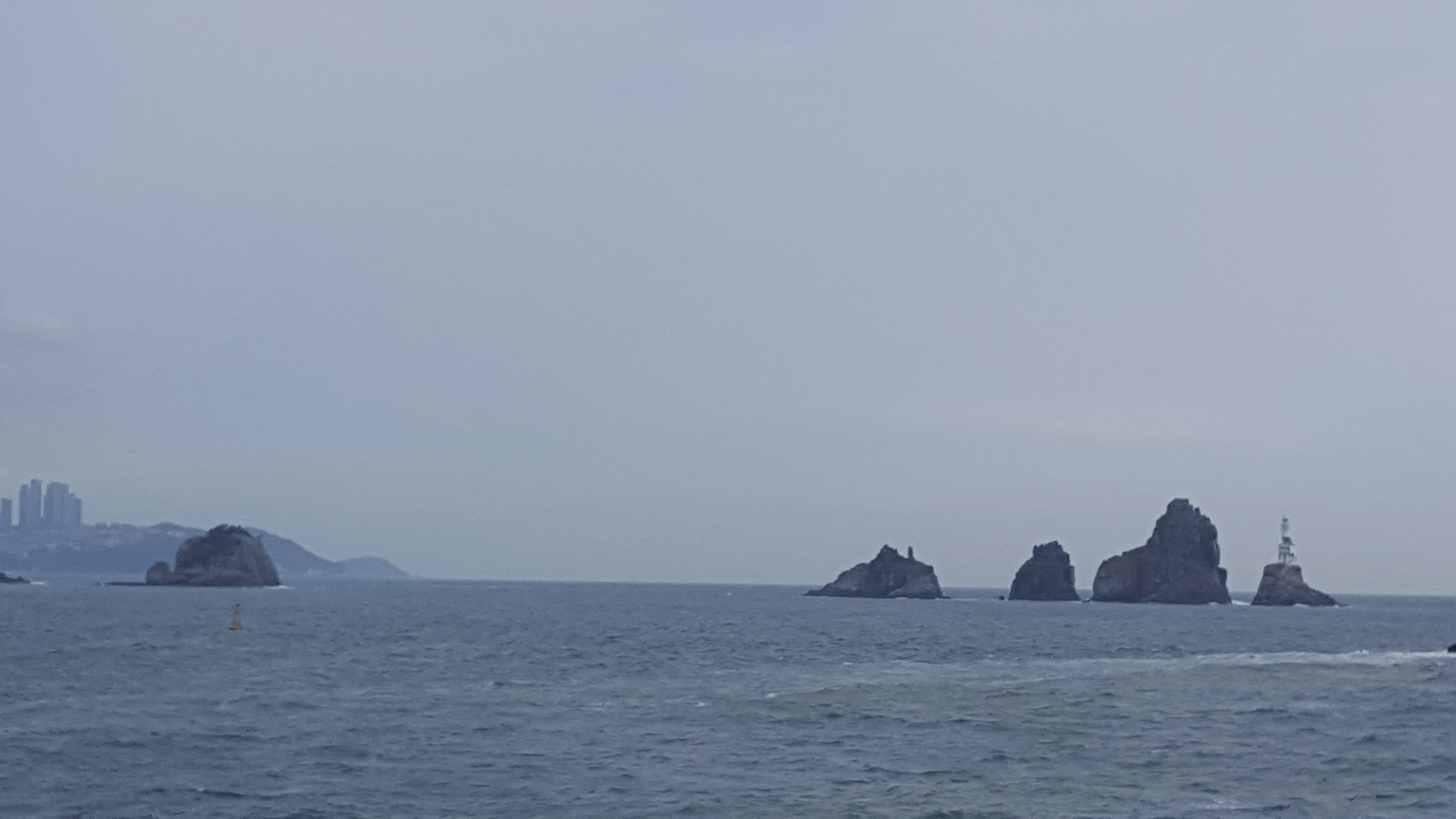
- The islands (2018)
- Interactive map of Oryukdo

Geography
- Location: Korea Strait
- Coordinates: 35°05′35″N 129°07′36″E
- Total islands: 6
- Major islands: Deungdaeseom
- Area: 28,189 m^{2} (303,420 sq ft)
- Highest elevation: 68 m (223 ft)
- Highest point: Gul-seom

Administration
- South Korea
- Neighborhood: Yongho-dong
- District: Nam-gu
- City: Busan

Scenic Sites of South Korea
- Official name: Oryukdo Islets, Busan
- Designated: 2007-10-01

Korean name
- Hangul: 오륙도
- Hanja: 五六島
- RR: Oryukdo
- MR: Oryukto

Oryukdo (Korean: 오륙도; lit. 'Five–Six Island[s]') is a group of islands in Busan Bay, in Yongho-dong, Nam District, Busan, South Korea. The name of the islands reflects the fact that they can consist of either five or six islands, depending on the current tides.

The island closest to the mainland, Usakdo (우삭도), can appear to be two separate islands during high tide, which are named Bangpaeseom (방패섬) and Solseom (솔섬). The remaining islands are, in order from closest to the mainland, Suriseom (수리섬), Songgotseom (송곳섬), Gulseom (굴섬), and Deungdaeseom (등대섬). All islands are uninhabited, except for Deungdaeseom, which has a lighthouse on it.

Oryukdo formed through volcanic activity 80 million years ago. Volcanic rock in the area were weathered away over time, leaving these islands. The islands are attested to in the 1740 geographical text Tongnaebuji (동래부지; 東萊府誌). The text reports that the number of islands changes depending on perspective.

It was designated as a Busan National Geopark. It is also a marine protected area and a state-designated cultural heritage site.

The Oryukdo Skywalk is a glass viewing platform positioned on a cliff overlooking the islands which opened in 2013.

== Gallery ==
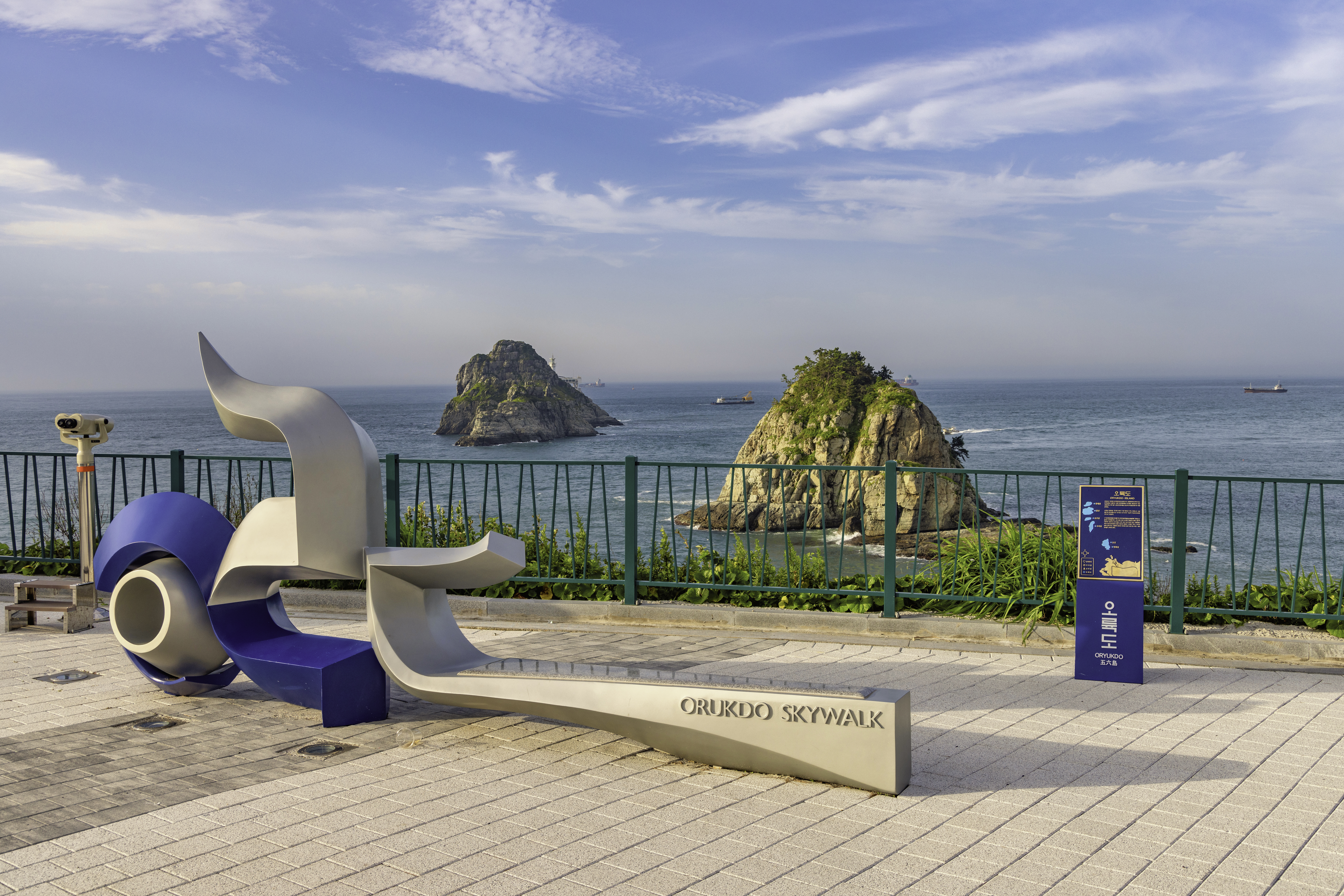
Photo spot in Oryukdo

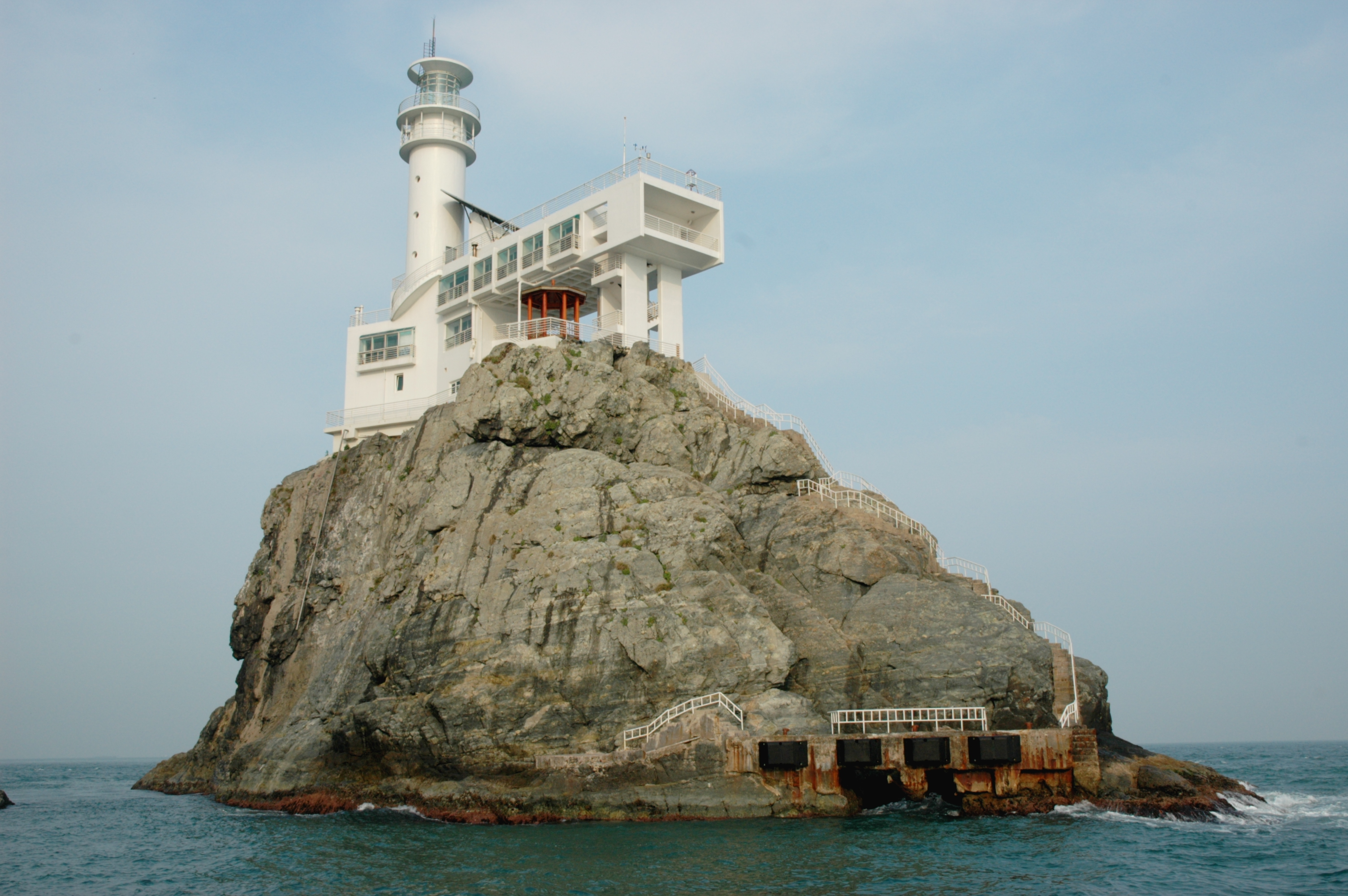
Deungdaeseom (2010)

== See also ==
- Tourism in South Korea
- Busan
