= Busan Bay =

Bay near Busan, South Korea

- 부산만 (Korean)
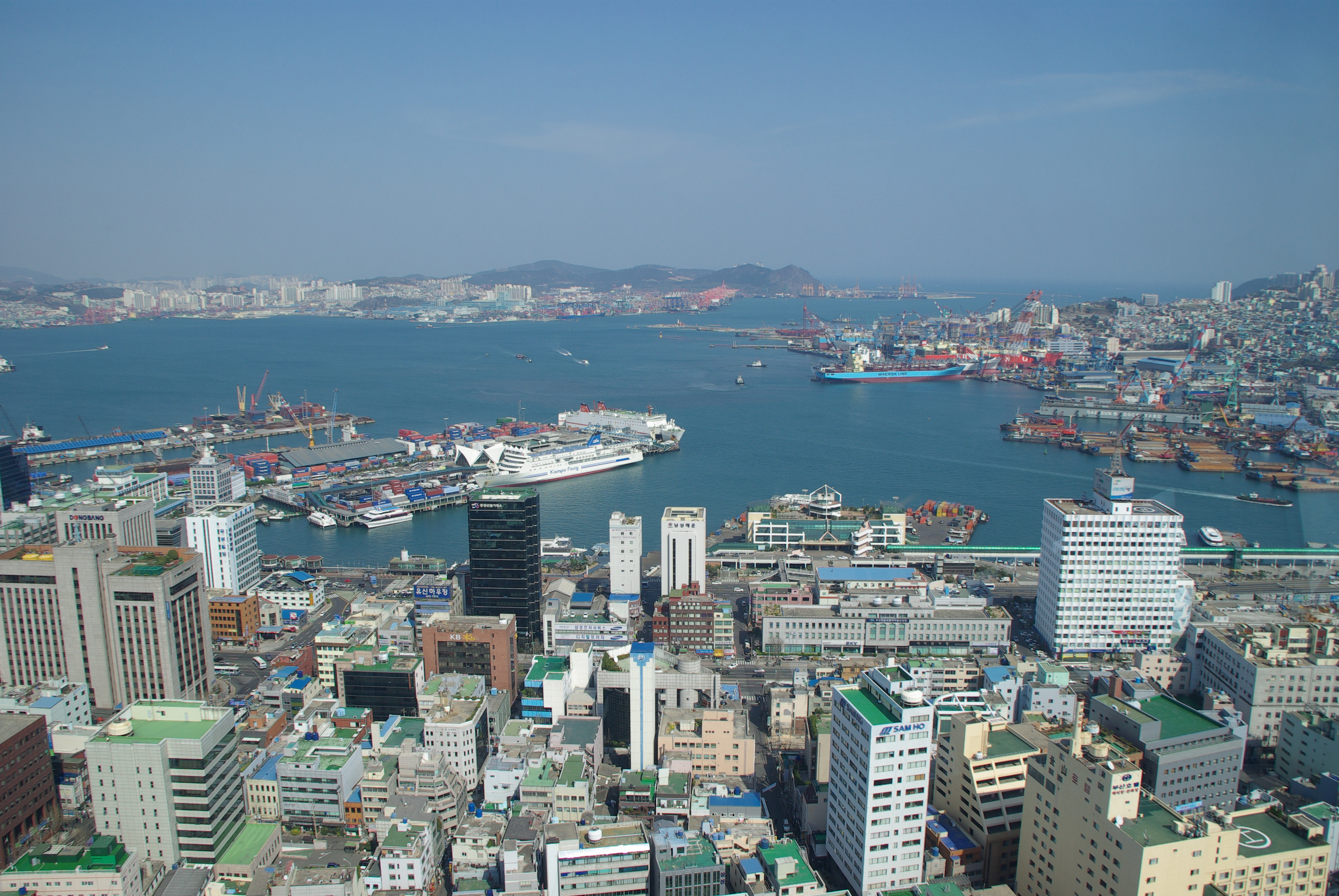
- Busan Bay with Busan Port (2008)

- Map of Busan Bay.
- Location: Busan, South Korea
- Coordinates: 35°06′02″N 129°04′22″E
- Part of: Korea Strait
- River sources: Dongcheon river
- Ocean/sea sources: Pacific Ocean
- Max. length: 28 km (17 mi)
- Max. width: 5.2 m (0.0032 mi)
- Average depth: 6 m (20 ft)–12 m (39 ft)
- Max. depth: 15 m (49 ft)
- Islands: Jodo

- Busan Bay
- Hangul: 부산만
- Hanja: 釜山灣
- RR: Busanman
- MR: Pusanman

Busan Bay (Korean: 부산만) is a bay located in the southern Busan, South Korea. The entrance of the bay opens to the southeast, and leads to the Korea Strait.

The bay has a number of islands in it, including Oryukdo, Yeongdo, Dudo, and Jodo.

== See also ==
- Port of Busan
