= Gwangju Jeil High School =

Public high school in Gwangju, South Korea

Coordinates: 35.1537°N 126.9065°E

Gwangju Jeil High School 광주제일고등학교
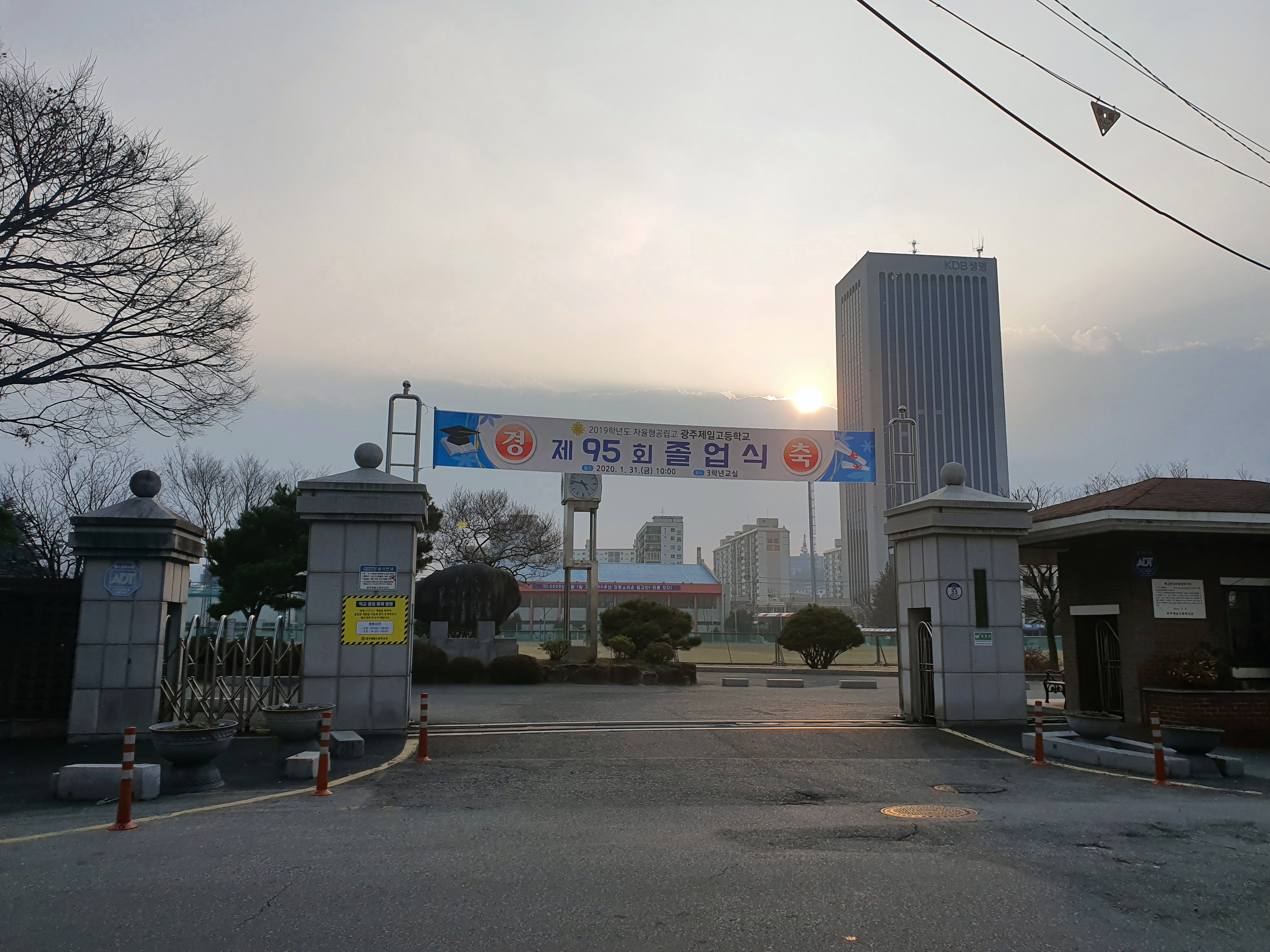
- Gwangju; South Korea

Information
- Type: Public
- Established: 1920
- Principal: Yang Jeong-gi
- Gender: Male
- Enrollment: 840

Gwangju Jeil High School (Korean: 광주제일고등학교) is a boys' high school in Gwangju, South Korea. It has 840 students in grades 10, 11, and 12. The school is considered to be one of the most prestigious high schools in Gwangu.

Historically, the school is known as the birthplace of the Gwangju Student Independence Movement, a series of protests in 1929 against the 1910–1945 Japanese rule of Korea.

The school is also known for its baseball team, and has won the Cheongryonggi championship multiple times. A number of its alumni have gone on to play professional baseball in Korea, Japan, and the United States. One of the school's most famous graduates is Sun Dong-yol, considered one of the greatest pitchers in the history of Korean professional baseball. Another graduate, Lee Jong-beom, nicknamed "Son of the Wind," is widely considered one of the best five-tool players in Korean baseball history, and the best all-around KBO player of the 1990s. As of 2026, the school has produced four Major League Baseball players, tying them with Japan's PL Gakuen High School and Tohoku High School for the most by any school in Asia.

== History ==
Gwangju Public High School was established in 1920. The Gwangju Ilgo school baseball club was established in 1923.

In late October 1929, students from the school helped spark demonstrations against Japanese rule. The Gwangju Student Independence Movement Memorial, housed in a park on the school's campus, was built in 1954 to commemorate the student independence movement. The Gwangju Student Independence Movement Memorial History Museum was built in 1997; it was designated as the 26th Gwangju Metropolitan City Monument on April 30, 1999.

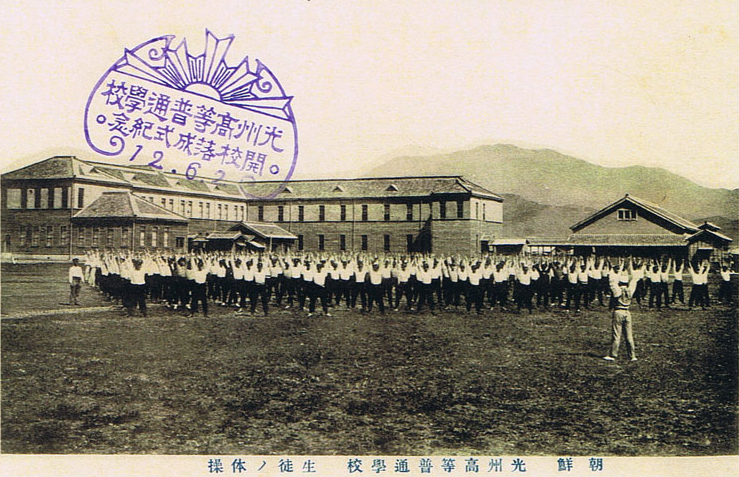
Gwangju Jeil High School during Korea under Japanese rule

Kim Yong-un, a mathematician, philosopher, and critic of civilizations, taught math at the school in the 1950s.

== Notable alumni ==
=== Professional baseball players ===
- Byung-hyun Kim (1997)
- Hee-seop Choi (1998)
- Jae Weong Seo (1996)
- Jeong Ju-hu (c. 2013)
- Jung-ho Kang (c. 2005)
- Lee Jong-beom (c. 1988)
- Lee Kang-chul (c. 1984)
- Park Jae-hong (c. 1991)
- Seo Geon-chang (c. 2006)
- Sun Dong-yol (1981)

=== Other professions ===
- Kim Sang-gon (1968) — politician
- Noh Hyeong-ouk (c. 1980) — activist and government official
- Sung Won Sohn (1962) — economist
