= Sung Won Sohn =

American economist

- Born: 1944 (age 81–82); Keijō, Korea, Empire of Japan
- Education: University of Florida; University of Pittsburgh
- Occupation: Economist

Korean name
- Hangul: 손성원
- Hanja: 孫聖源
- RR: Son Seongwon
- MR: Son Sŏngwŏn

Sung Won Sohn (Korean: 손성원; born 1944) is a Korean-born American economist, noted for his skill in economic forecasting. He is currently the President of SS Economics, an economic consulting firm.

== Personal life ==
Sohn was born in Keijō and later lived in Gwangju. He graduated from Gwangju Jeil High School in 1962. He came to the United States that year to study economics as an undergraduate at the University of Florida in Gainesville on a partial scholarship. He earned his Master's in economics from Wayne State University, and his Ph.D. in the same field from University of Pittsburgh. He also earned an PMD from Harvard Business School. and a certificate in real estate from MIT in 2019.

== Career ==
One of Sohn's Ph.D. advisors, Marina Whitman, left Pittsburgh to become a member of the President's Council of Economic Advisors under the Nixon administration; she was so impressed by his work that she brought him on board as senior economist at the White House. On the White House Council, he was responsible for economic and legislative matters pertaining to the Federal Reserve and financial markets. His weekly economic and financial report to the President earned him attention from President Nixon.

A New York banker introduced Sohn to the president of the Northwest National Bank of Minnesota, where Sohn would move for his next job. He remained with the bank through various name changes and mergers, as it became Norwest Corporation and then purchased Wells Fargo in 1998, and rose to the position of Executive Vice President and chief economist.

In January 2005, Sohn moved from Minneapolis to Los Angeles to take up a position as president and CEO of Hanmi Bank. After more than three decades in Minnesota, he stated that he was looking forward to moving to a warmer climate with a larger Korean American population. He retired from that position in December 2007. He would later become the vice chairman of fashion retailer Forever 21. In 2008, he joined the faculty of California State University, Channel Islands as Martin V. Smith Professor of Economics and in 2019 became a professor of finance at Loyola Marymount University.

== Other activities ==
In 2011, Los Angeles mayor Antonio Villaraigosa appointed him a member of the Los Angeles Harbor Commission, which has oversight authority for the Port of Los Angeles. In 2016, Mayor Eric Garcetti appointed to Sohn to LACERS board (which manages $23 billion in employee pension fund) where he is the chairman of the Investment Committee. He also served on the boards of Western Alliance Bancorporation and National Association of Corporate Directors PSW Emeritus. He is a Trustee emeritus at Claremont Graduate University. He was on the boards of First California Bank, Ministers Mutual Life Insurance Company, L.A. Music Center (Performing Arts), Foreign Affairs Council of Los Angeles, and Children's Bureau of Los Angeles.

== Awards and recognition ==
In 2006, the Wall Street Journal featured a story naming Sohn as the most accurate economist in the United States. In 2010 the Journal named him as one of the five most accurate economists in the United States. In 2012 he ranked third. In 2004, a Bloomberg Markets magazine survey ranked Sohn as the U.S.' second-best GDP forecaster for the 12 months ending in June 2004. In 2012 the Wall Street Journal again ranked him as one of the U.S.' best economic forecasters; he was the only representative of academia ranked in the top 10, and one of just five in the top 50.

He was chosen as one of the 100 most influential Minnesotans of the 20th century by the state's largest newspaper, the Star Tribune. Others on the list included Charles Lindberg, Sinclair Lewis, Hubert Humphrey, Walter Mondale and Charles M. Schulz.

== Works ==
- 세계 금융위기와 출구전략 [Global Financial Crisis and Exit Strategy]. 매일경제신문사 [ Maeil Business Newspaper ]. November 2009. ISBN 9788974426156.
- 미래 경제 [The New Economy]. 알에이치코리아 [RH Korea]. March 2014. ISBN 9788925552453.
