= Kim Yong-un =

South Korean mathematician and scholar

Kim Yong-un (Korean: 김용운; 6 September 1927 – 30 May 2020) was a South Korean mathematician, philosopher, and critic of civilisations. He was active in various fields of mathematics, philosophy, anthropology, and linguistics, and is considered to have established the history of mathematics in Korea. He was a professor of mathematics at Hanyang University.

== Life ==
Kim Yong-un was born in Tokyo, Japan in 1927. He was liberated in the year he entered Waseda University and returned to his father's hometown of Naju, South Jeolla Province in 1946. While working as a math teacher at Mokpo High School and Gwangju Jeil High School since 1947, he felt the need to popularize math and later wrote several popular math books. After teaching for more than 10 years, he earned a doctorate in science while studying in the United States and Canada.

In the late 1970s, he studied the history of mathematics, and since the 1980s, he has analyzed Korea and Japan in a comparative cultural way by combining mathematics and history. The original form, which means collective unconsciousness of the community, and the locality in which the community is located, were involved in the development of language and history. In 1983, he founded the Korean Mathematical History Association and became the first chairman, and in 1994, he participated in the development process of Ungjin Publishing (now Ungjin Thinkbig), a mathematics learning magazine brand of Ungjin Publishing (now Ungjin Thinkbig), along with his younger brother, Professor Kim Yong-guk of Hanyang University. This is also the predecessor of Thinkbig, a learning center brand of Ungjin. He wrote more than 150 books throughout his life.

== Academic background ==
- Bachelor's degree in mining at Waseda University in Japan (dropout)
- Bachelor's degree in mathematics at Chosun University
- Graduate School of Orburn University in the U.S. (Bachelor of Science)
- Graduate School of University of Alberta, Canada (Doctor of Science)

== Career ==
- Assistant Professor of University of Wisconsin (1962–1965)
- Visiting professor at Kobe University in Japan
- A visiting professor at Tokyo University in Japan
- Guest Professor of the Center for International Cultural Research in Japan
- Professor of Mathematics at Hanyang University (1969–1993)
- President of the Korean Mathematical History Society
- Professor emeritus of mathematics at Hanyang University (1994-current)
- Chairman of the Korea Broadcasting Culture Promotion Agency (2000–2003)
- Director of the Korean Mathematical and Cultural Institute

== Books ==
《수학의 약점》, 전파과학사, 1973.; 《공간의 역사》, 전파과학사, 1975. (김용국 공저); 《한국 수학사》, 열화당, 1977. (김용국 공저); 《세계수학 문화사》, 전파과학사, 1979. (김용국 공저); 《카타스트로피 이론입문》, 우성문화사, 1980.; 《초등상미분방정식》, 청문각, 1983. (신재철, 엄장일 공저); 《韓國人と日本人: 雙對文化のプリズム》, サイマル出版會, 1983.; 《鎖國の汎パラダイム: 日韓文化の異質性》, サイマル出版會, 1984.; 《동양의 이학과 사상》, 일지사, 1984. (김용국 공저); 《개성상인의 상술》, 한길사, 1986.; 《日韓民族の原型: 同じ種から違った花が笑く》, サイマル出版會, 1986.; 《인간학으로서의 수학》, 우성문화사, 1988.; 《토폴로지 입문》, 우성문화사, 1988. (김용국 공저); 《訪れる没落: 「原型史觀」が示した日韓米の盛衰》, 情報センタ-出版局, 1988.; 《일본의 몰락》, 한국경제신문사, 1989.; 《집합론과 수학》, 우성문화사, 1989. (김용국 공저); 《수학의 흐름》, 전파과학사, 1989. (김용국 공저); 《재미있는 수학여행》 1-4, 김영사, 1990-1991. (김용국 공저); 《엄마의 산수》 1-2, 김영사, 1992. (김용국 공저); 《지성의 비극》, 일지사, 1992. (김용국 공저); 《원형의 유혹》, 한길사, 1994.	《한국인과 일본인》 1-4, 한길사, 1994.; 《중국수학사》, 민음사, 1996. (김용국 공저); 《김용운·김용국 교수의 수학 클리닉》, 김영사, 1997. (김용국 공저); 《카오스의 날갯짓》, 김영사, 1999.; 《韓·中·日의 역사와 미래를 말한다》, 문학사상사, 2000. (진순신 공저); 《카오스와 불교》, 사이언스북스, 2001.; 《한국수학사 논문집》, 한국학술정보, 2003.; 《문화 속의 수학》, 한국학술정보, 2003.; 《일본어는 한국어다》 1-2, 가나북스, 2006.; 《한·일간의 얽힌 실타래》, 문학사상사, 2007.; 《한국어는 신라어 일본어는 백제어》, 시사일본어사, 2009.; 《청소년을 위한 한국 수학사》, 살림MATH, 2009.; 《천황은 백제어로 말한다》, 한얼사, 2009.; 《수학사대전》, 경문사, 2010.; 《천황이 된 백제의 왕자들》, 한얼사, 2010.; 《나라의 힘은 수학 수준에 비례한다》, 경문사, 2011.; 《김용운의 수학사》, 살림. 2013.; 《풍수화》, 맥스교육, 2014.; 《수학의 원리 철학으로 캐다》, 상수리, 2017.; 《역사의 역습》, 맥스미디어, 2018.; 《개인의 이성이 어떻게 국가를 바꾸는가》, 맥스미디어, 2020.
