= Haeundae I'Park =

Skyscraper complex in Busan, South Korea

- 해운대 아이파크
- Marine City's Haeundae I'Park
- Interactive map of the Haeundae I'Park area

General information
- Type: 3 residential towers
- Location: U-dong, Haeundae District, Busan, South Korea (Marine City, Busan)
- Coordinates: 35°09′25.68″N 129°08′34.06″E
- Construction started: 2007
- Completed: October 2011
- Owner: HDC Hyundai Development Company

Height
- Architectural: Tower 1: 272.9 m (895 ft); Tower 2: 292.1 m (958 ft); Tower 3: 205.5 m (674 ft)
- Tip: Tower 2: 293.3 m (962 ft)
- Top floor: Tower 1: 223.5 m (733 ft); Tower 2: 242.6 m (796 ft); Tower 3: 156.1 m (512 ft)

Technical details
- Floor count: Tower 1: 66; Tower 2: 72; Tower 3: 46; Underground: B5
- Floor area: 511,805 m^{2} (5,509,020 sq ft)
- Lifts/elevators: 30

Design and construction
- Architect: Studio Daniel Libeskind
- Structural engineer: Arup

Haeundae I'Park (Korean: 해운대 아이파크) is a complex of three skyscrapers and several minor buildings in Haeundae District, Busan, South Korea consisting of three residential towers and other office buildings. Tower 1 and 2 were both in the 20 tallest buildings completed in 2011. As of 2022, Tower 2 and Tower 1 are the eighth and 12th-tallest buildings in South Korea respectively. The neighboring hotel, Park Hyatt Busan by the Hyatt Hotels Corporation, is built in a similar style.

== Gallery ==
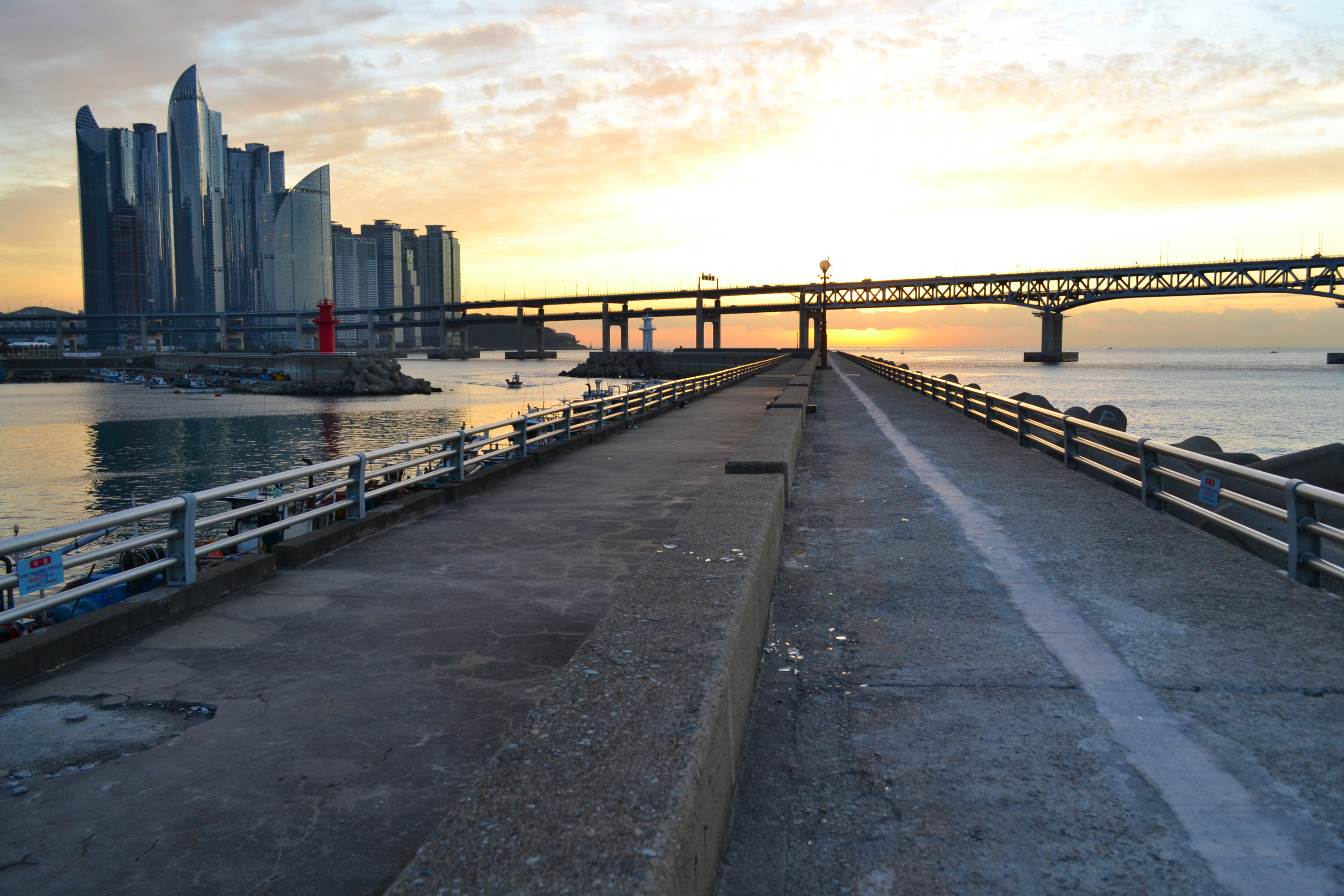
Haeundae I'Park and Gwangan Bridge

Haeundae I'Park Busan South Korea

Haeundae I'Park under construction

== See also ==
- List of tallest buildings in Busan
- List of tallest buildings in South Korea
