= Busan International Finance Center =

- 부산국제금융센터
- Busan International Finance Center in 2022
- Interactive map of the Busan International Finance Center area

General information
- Status: Completed
- Type: Office
- Architectural style: Futurism; Modern
- Location: Busan, South Korea
- Coordinates: 35.14737°N 129.06561°E
- Construction started: 2011
- Completed: 2014

Height
- Height: 289 m (948 ft)

Technical details
- Material: Concrete; Glass
- Floor count: 63

Design and construction
- Architecture firm: HAUD
- Developer: Busan Metropolitan City Corporation
- Structural engineer: IL Structural Eng. Co. (design); Thornton Tomasetti (peer review)
- Main contractor: Hyundai Engineering & Construction

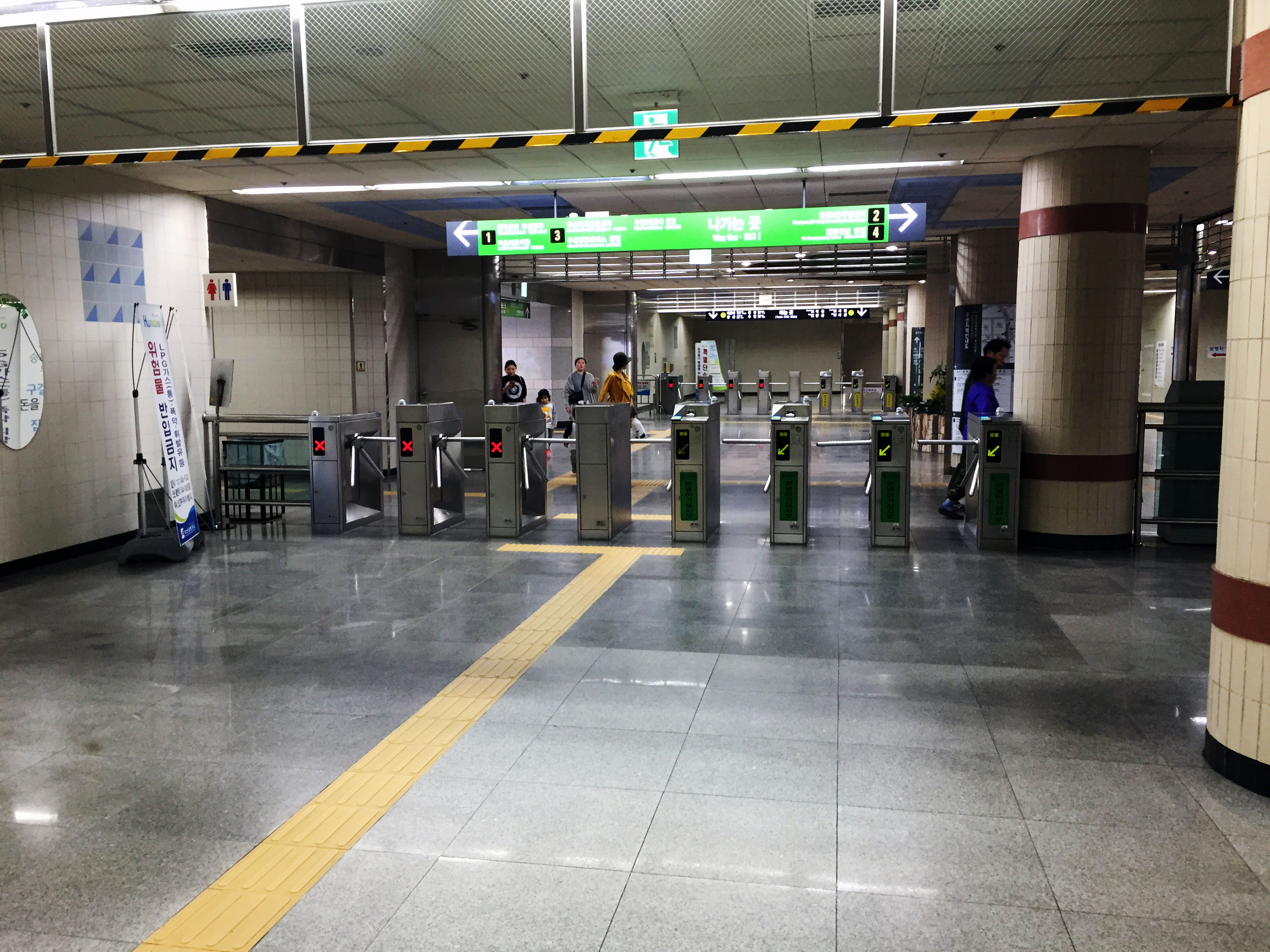
Busan International Finance Center Busan Bank Station

Busan International Finance Center (BIFC) (Korean: 부산국제금융센터) is a 289 m (948 ft) skyscraper in Busan, South Korea.

== Overview ==
The building's construction started in 2011 and finished in 2014. It has 63 floors. The building was developed by Busan Metropolitan City Corporation. It was designed by HAUD and constructed by Hyundai Engineering & Construction. Upon its completion, it became the third tallest building in Busan and the fourth tallest in South Korea.

The building was designed to withstand a 7.0 magnitude earthquake. Besides that, it was also projected as the catalyst for the city's economic growth.

== See also ==
- List of tallest buildings in Busan
- List of tallest buildings in South Korea
