= WBC The Palace =

Residential towers in Busan, South Korea

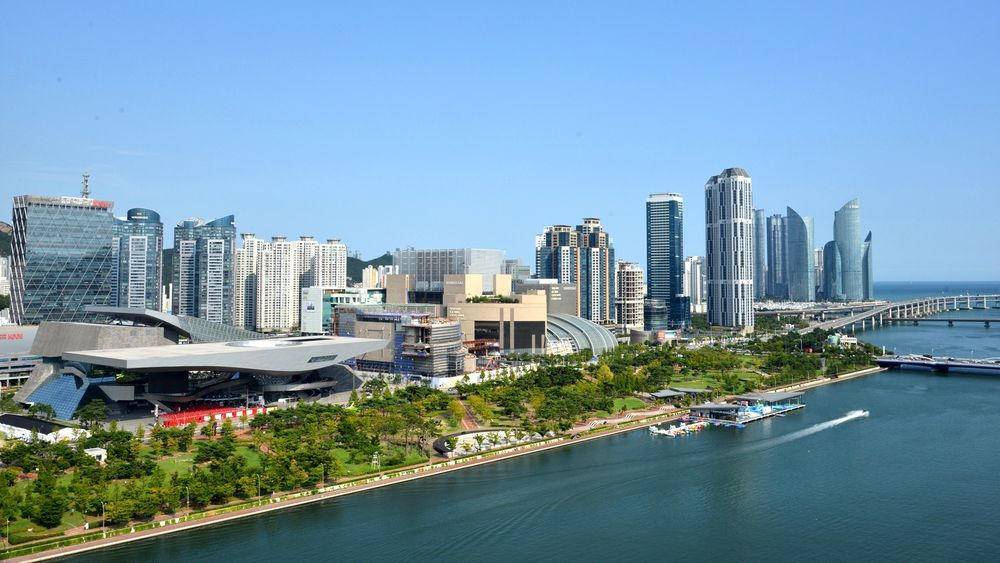
- Interactive map of the WBC The Palace area

General information
- Type: 2 residential towers
- Location: Busan, South Korea
- Coordinates: 35.16565°N 129.131292°E
- Construction started: 2007
- Completed: 2011

Height
- Architectural: Tower 1: 265 m (869 ft); Tower 2: 265 m (869 ft)

Design and construction
- Architects: WonWoo Architects & Engineers Co. Ltd.

WBC The Palace is a complex of two residential skyscrapers in Busan, South Korea consisting of three office towers and one residential tower. Tower 1 and 2 were both completed in 2011.
