= Dongcheon High School =

Private school in Busan, South Korea

Coordinates: 35.144793°N 129.087097°E

- 동천고등학교
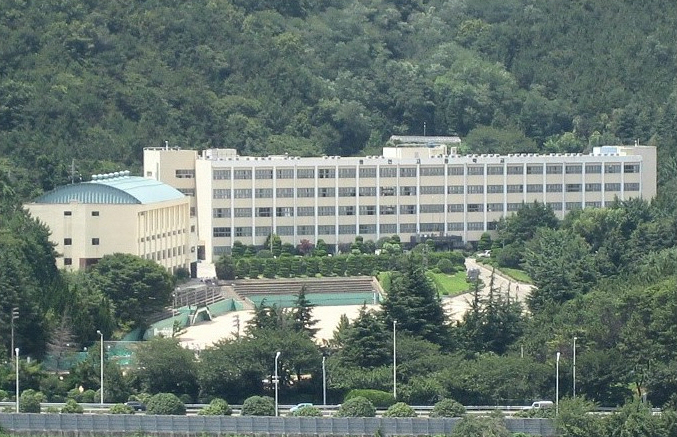

Location
- Motgol-Byeonyong Ro 105 Daeyeon-dong; Nam District, Busan, Busan; South Korea

Information
- Type: Common High School
- Motto: "인내천 (人乃天))" (literal translation: "Human is god")
- Established: 1980
- Principal: Yu-Kyu Kim
- Grades: 10–12
- Enrollment: 1085 (2014)
- Website: http://www.dongcheon.hs.kr

- Dongcheon High School
- Hangul: 동천고등학교
- Hanja: 東天高等學校
- RR: Dongcheon godeunghakgyo
- MR: Tongch'ŏn kodŭnghakkyo

Dongcheon High School (Korean: 동천고등학교) is a private school for those graduating from middle school. The school was established in 1980, and is located in Nam District, Busan. It is one of the eighty-four high schools in Busan.

The school is the only high-school run by The Cheondoism Foundation, a Korean traditional religion.

The school gives education based on "human is god" motto, and the religion of the school is Cheondoism. Graduates have made significant contributions in many fields.

== See also ==
- High School
