= Yongho-dong, Busan =

Administrative division in South Korea

- Hangul: 용호동
- Hanja: 龍湖洞
- RR: Yongho-dong
- MR: Yongho-dong

Yongho-dong (Korean: 용호동) is a dong on the coast of Busan, a major port city in southeastern South Korea. Its mainland portion is bordered on three sides by water, standing on a peninsula which separates Busan Harbor from Suyeong Bay. Its boundaries include the famed islets of Oryukdo, and several other small uninhabited islands.

Yongho-dong is a legal dong; for administrative purposes, it is divided into four administrative dong: Yongho 1,2,3, and 4-dong. Yongho 1-dong alone, with more than 43,000 people, is the most heavily populated administrative dong in Nam-gu.

Yongho-dong is densely populated; its 7 square kilometers of land are home to more than 72,000 people. Thanks to its proximity to the harbor, it is also the site of a campus of the Korea Institute of Maritime and Fisheries Technology.

There are varying accounts of the origin of the name "Yongho," which dates to the Japanese occupation. The second syllable ho means lake, and refers to a salt pan which once lay on Suyeong Bay at the dong's north end. The first syllable yong, which means "dragon," may have referred to a legend that the pan was inhabited by an imugi, a snake which failed to become a dragon. However, this syllable may also have simply been borrowed from the name of neighboring Yongdang-dong, to signify "the lake next to Yongdang-dong."

The highest point in Yongho-dong is the low peak of Jangsanbong, overlooking the harbor.

== See also ==
- Geography of South Korea
