= Nam District, Busan =

District of Busan, South Korea

Coordinates: 35.14°N 129.08°E

Nam
- Autonomous District
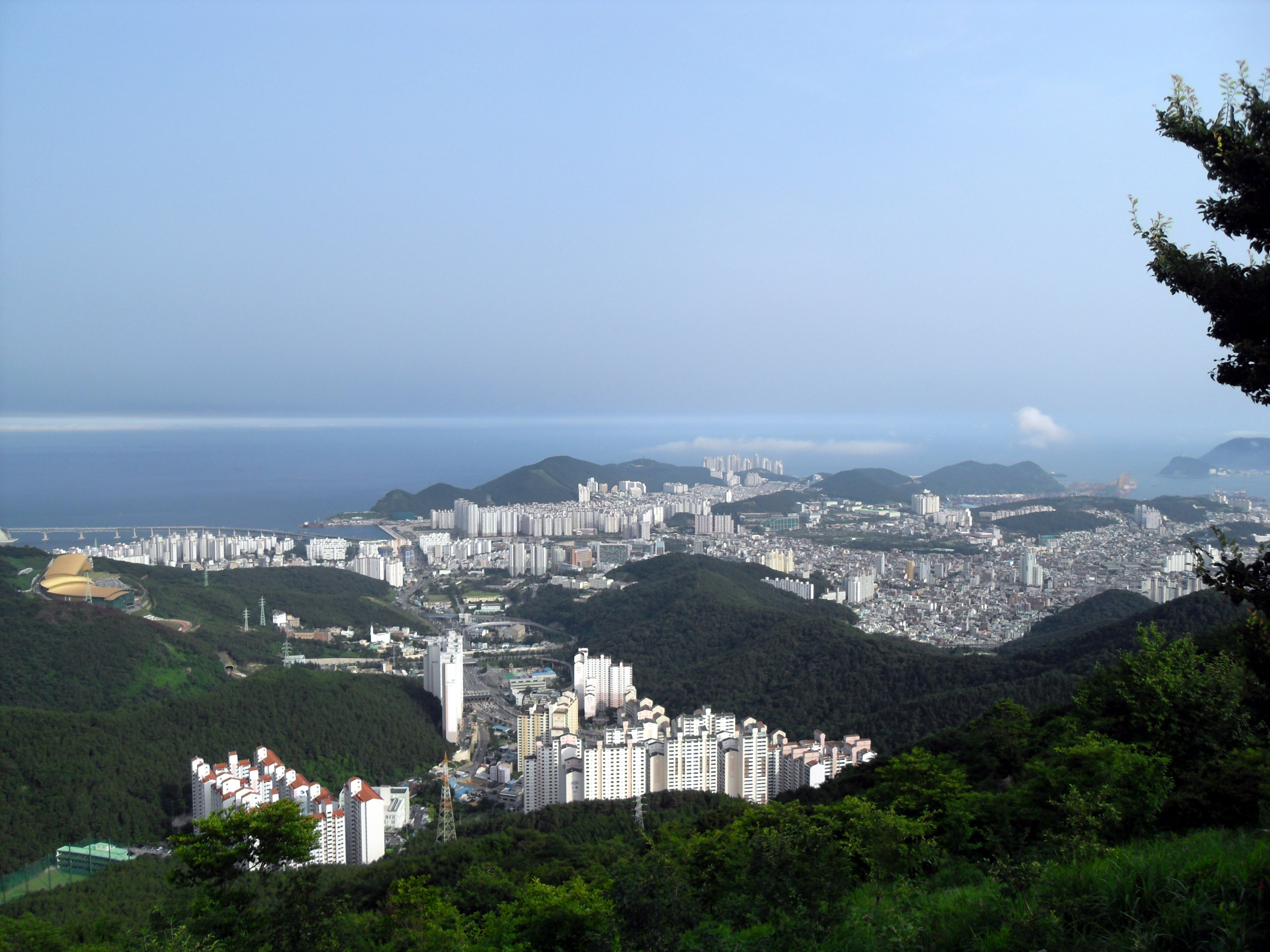

- Flag

- Country: South Korea
- Region: Yeongnam
- Provincial level: Busan
- Administrative divisions: 19 administrative dong

Government
  - Mayor: Park Jae-beom (박재범)

Area
  - Total: 26.82 km^{2} (10.36 sq mi)

Population (September 2024)
  - Total: 255,387
  - Density: 9,522/km^{2} (24,660/sq mi)
  - Dialect: Gyeongsang
- Website: Nam District Office

Korean name
- Hangul: 남구
- Hanja: 南區
- RR: Nam-gu
- MR: Nam-gu

Nam District (Korean: 남구; lit. 'South District') is a gu, or district, in south-central Busan, South Korea. Much of Nam District sticks out into the Sea of Japan, forming a peninsula which separates Suyeong Bay from Busan Harbor. It has an area of 25.91 km^{2}. Nam District officially became a gu of Busan in 1975. In 1995 part of Nam District was divided to form Suyeong District.

The Busan International Finance Center is located here.

== Demographics ==
Nam District is home to some 300,000 people, for a population density exceeding 11,000 per square kilometer. Less than 1,000 of its inhabitants are non-Korean.

== Busan Subway ==
The Busan Subway (line 2) passes through Nam District, where an interchange connects it to the highway leading to the Gwangan Bridge. Six subway stations along Busan Subway (line 2) are located in Nam District, going from Kyungsung University · Pukyong National University Station to Busan International Finance Center Station.

== Geography ==
Nam District contains a total of 7 islands, all uninhabited, with a total area of only 0.3 km^{2}. Among these are the Oryukdo islets which mark the entrance to Busan Harbor. The highest point of Nam District lies inland: the peak of Hwangnyeongsan, at 427 meters above sea level. Hwangnyeong-san also marks the point where Nam District's borders meet those of Yeonje District and Busanjin District.

== Administrative divisions ==
Administrative divisions

Nam District is divided into 6 legal dong, which altogether comprise 17 administrative dong, as follows:

- Daeyeon-dong (5 administrative dong)
- Yongho-dong (4 administrative dong)
- Yongdang-dong
- Gamman-dong (2 administrative dong)
- Uam-dong
- Munhyeon-dong (4 administrative dong)

== Education ==
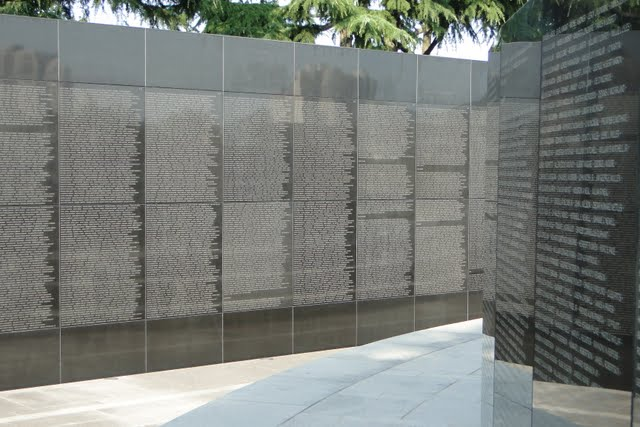
UN Memorial Cemetery which is in the Nam District

A number of institutions of higher education, including 6 universities, are located in Nam District. It includes Pusan University of Foreign Studies, Kyungsung University, Tongmyong University, and Pukyong National University.

=== Universities with graduate schools ===
- Pusan University of Foreign Studies (PUFS)
- Pukyong National University (PKNU)
- Kyungsung University
- Tongmyong University

=== Other institutes of higher education ===
- Busan Arts College
- Korea Institute of Maritime and Fisheries Technology

=== Secondary schools ===
- Daeyeon High School
- Dongcheon High School

== Other features ==
The district is home to the United Nations Memorial Cemetery, which contains graves of United Nations Command soldiers of the Korean War.

The district also hosts the Busan Naval Base.

== Sister city ==
- Qinhuangdao, China

== See also ==
- Geography of South Korea
- Subdivisions of South Korea

== Notes ==
1. Nam District office population register, June 30, 2006. Nam District website (in Korean)
2. Nam District statistical yearbook 2004, 토지와 기후 (Toji-wa Gihu) (Land and climate), table 3. Electronic version (HWP format)
3. Nam District statistical yearbook 2004, 인구 (In-gu) (Population). Electronic version (HWP format)
4. Nam District statistical yearbook 2004, 토지와 기후 (Toji-wa Gihu) (Land and climate), table 1. Electronic version (HWP format)
