= Sasang (constituency) =

Constituency in Busan, South Korea

- Single-member constituency for the National Assembly
- Location of the constituency
- District(s): Sasang District
- Region: Busan
- Electorate: 181,823 (2024)

Current constituency
- Created: 2000
- Seats: 1
- Party: People Power Party
- Member: Kim Dae-sik
- Created from: Sasang A, Sasang B

Sasang (Korean: 사상구) is a constituency of the National Assembly of South Korea. The constituency consists of Sasang District, Busan. As of 2024, 181,823 eligible voters were registered in the constituency. The constituency was created in 2000 after the consolidation of the Sasang A and Sasang B constituencies.

== History ==
Sasang, like the majority of constituencies located in the Busan–Gyeongnam Area is widely considered a stronghold for the conservative People Power Party. Accordingly, the constituency has consistently elected members of conservative political parties and allied independents, with the only exception being in 2012 when Moon Jae-in of the liberal Democratic United Party was elected.

Kwon Chul-hyun of the conservative Grand National Party was the first member to represent the constituency. He won re-election in 2004, but was "cut-off" from being re-nominated in 2008. He was succeeded by Chang Je-won, the son of former Deputy Speaker of the National Assembly of South Korea Chang Sŏng-man. Chang did not run for re-election in 2012 due to a bribery scandal, and the Saenuri Party nominated Son Su-jo as the party's candidate for Sasang. Moon Jae-in of the liberal Democratic United Party defeated Son in the general election, marking the only time a member of a centre-left, liberal party won in the constituency. Moon led an unsuccessful presidential campaign in the 2012 South Korean presidential election and remained as the member of the National Assembly for Sasang. Moon did not run for re-election and was succeeded by the constituency's former member Chang Je-won. Chang, who ran as an independent candidate, garnered 37.5% of the vote and narrowly beat out Democratic opponent Bae Jae-jung in a three-way race. Chang won re-election in 2020 with 52.03% of the vote, once again defeating Bae Jae-jung of the Democratic Party. Ahead of the 2024 South Korean legislative election, Chang announced that he would not stand for re-election. The People Power Party nominated Kim Dae-sik, who went on to win the general election; Bae Jae-jung marked her third consecutive loss in Sasang.

== Boundaries ==
The constituency encompasses the entirety of Sasang District, Busan. It borders the constituencies of Seo–Dong to the southeast, Saha A to the south, Busanjin A and Busanjin B to the east, Buk A to the north, and Gangseo to the west.

== List of members in the National Assembly ==
Election	Member	Party	Dates	Notes
2000	Kwon Chul-hyun	Grand National	2000–2008	
2004	Kwon Chul-hyun	Grand National	2000–2008	
2008	Chang Je-won	Grand National	2008–2012	
2012	Moon Jae-in	Democratic United	2012–2016	Senior Secretary for Civil Affairs (2003–2004, 2005–2006); Senior Secretary for Civil Society (2004–2005); Chief of Staff to the President (2007–2008) Ran as the Democratic United Party candidate for President of South Korea in the 2012 South Korean presidential election Leader of the New Politics Alliance for Democracy·Democratic Party (2015–2016) President of South Korea (2017–2022)
2016	Chang Je-won	Independent	2016–2024	Returned to the Saenuri Party on June 23, 2016 Left the Saenuri Party and joined the Bareun Party on December 27, 2016, as a result of the 2016 South Korean political scandal Left the Bareun Party and returned to the Liberty Korea Party on May 2, 2017
2020	Chang Je-won	United Future	2016–2024	Returned to the Saenuri Party on June 23, 2016 Left the Saenuri Party and joined the Bareun Party on December 27, 2016, as a result of the 2016 South Korean political scandal Left the Bareun Party and returned to the Liberty Korea Party on May 2, 2017
2024	Kim Dae-sik	People Power	2024–present	

== Election results ==
=== 2024 ===
Legislative Election 2024: Sasang
Party	Candidate	Votes	%	±%
People Power	Kim Dae-sik	62,975	52.63	▲0.6
Democratic	Bae Jae-jung	56,659	47.36	▲0.82
Rejected ballots		1,658	–	
Turnout		121,292	66.70	▼0.66
Registered electors		181,823		
People Power hold		Swing		

=== 2020 ===
Legislative Election 2020: Sasang
Party	Candidate	Votes	%	±%
United Future	Chang Je-won	66,353	52.03	▲25.42
Democratic	Bae Jae-jung	59,346	46.54	▲10.67
National Revolutionary	Kim Jun-ho	1,006	0.78	new
Our Republican	Lee Ju-cheon	809	0.63	new
Rejected ballots		1,587	–	
Turnout		129,101	67.36	▲9.64
Registered electors		191,651		
United Future hold		Swing		

=== 2016 ===
Legislative Election 2016: Sasang
Party	Candidate	Votes	%	±%
Independent	Chang Je-won	42,924	37.50	new
Democratic	Bae Jae-jung	41,055	35.87	▼19.17
Saenuri	Son Su-jo	30,463	26.61	▼17.14
Rejected ballots		1,461	–	
Turnout		115,903	57.72	▲0.3
Registered electors		200,808		
Independent gain from Democratic		Swing		

=== 2012 ===
Legislative Election 2012: Sasang
Party	Candidate	Votes	%	±%
Democratic United	Moon Jae-in	65,336	55.04	new
Saenuri	Son Su-jo	51,936	43.75	▼1.73
Korea Vision	Na Kyung-soo	749	0.63	new
Real Democratic	Son Hyun-kyung	668	0.56	new
Rejected ballots		866	–	
Turnout		119,555	57.42	▲19.66
Registered electors		208,214		
Democratic United gain from Saenuri		Swing		

=== 2008 ===
Legislative Election 2008: Sasang
Party	Candidate	Votes	%	±%
Grand National	Chang Je-won	35,039	45.48	▼7.26
Pro-Park	Kang Ju-man	28,485	36.97	new
Democratic Labor	Cho Cha-ri	12,096	15.70	new
Family Party for Peace and Unity	Kim Myung-on	1,410	1.83	–
Rejected ballots		1,349	–	
Turnout		78,379	37.76	▼23.65
Registered electors		207,579		
Grand National hold		Swing		

=== 2004 ===
Legislative Election 2004: Sasang
Party	Candidate	Votes	%	±%
Grand National	Kwon Chul-hyun	67,960	52.74	▼12.47
Uri	Chung Yoon-jae	56,158	43.58	new
Independent	Lee Sang-deok	1,787	1.38	new
Millennium Democratic	Han Seung-jong	1,686	1.30	▼12.46
Green Social Democratic	Kim Sang-gil	1,254	0.97	new
Rejected ballots		1,243	–	
Turnout		130,088	61.41	▲9.55
Registered electors		211,749		
Grand National hold		Swing		

=== 2000 ===
Legislative Election 2000: Sasang
Party	Candidate	Votes	%	±%
Grand National	Kwon Chul-hyun	68,751	65.21	–
Democratic People's	Shin Sang-woo	18,823	17.85	–
Millennium Democratic	Lee Eun-soo	14,512	13.76	–
United Liberal Democrats	Lee Sang-deok	3,343	3.17	–
Rejected ballots		1,308	–	
Turnout		106,737	51.86	–
Registered electors		205,828		
Grand National hold		Swing		

== See also ==
- List of constituencies of the National Assembly of South Korea
- Dongseo Univ
- Silla Univ
