= Chang Je-won =

South Korean politician (1967–2025)

- 장제원
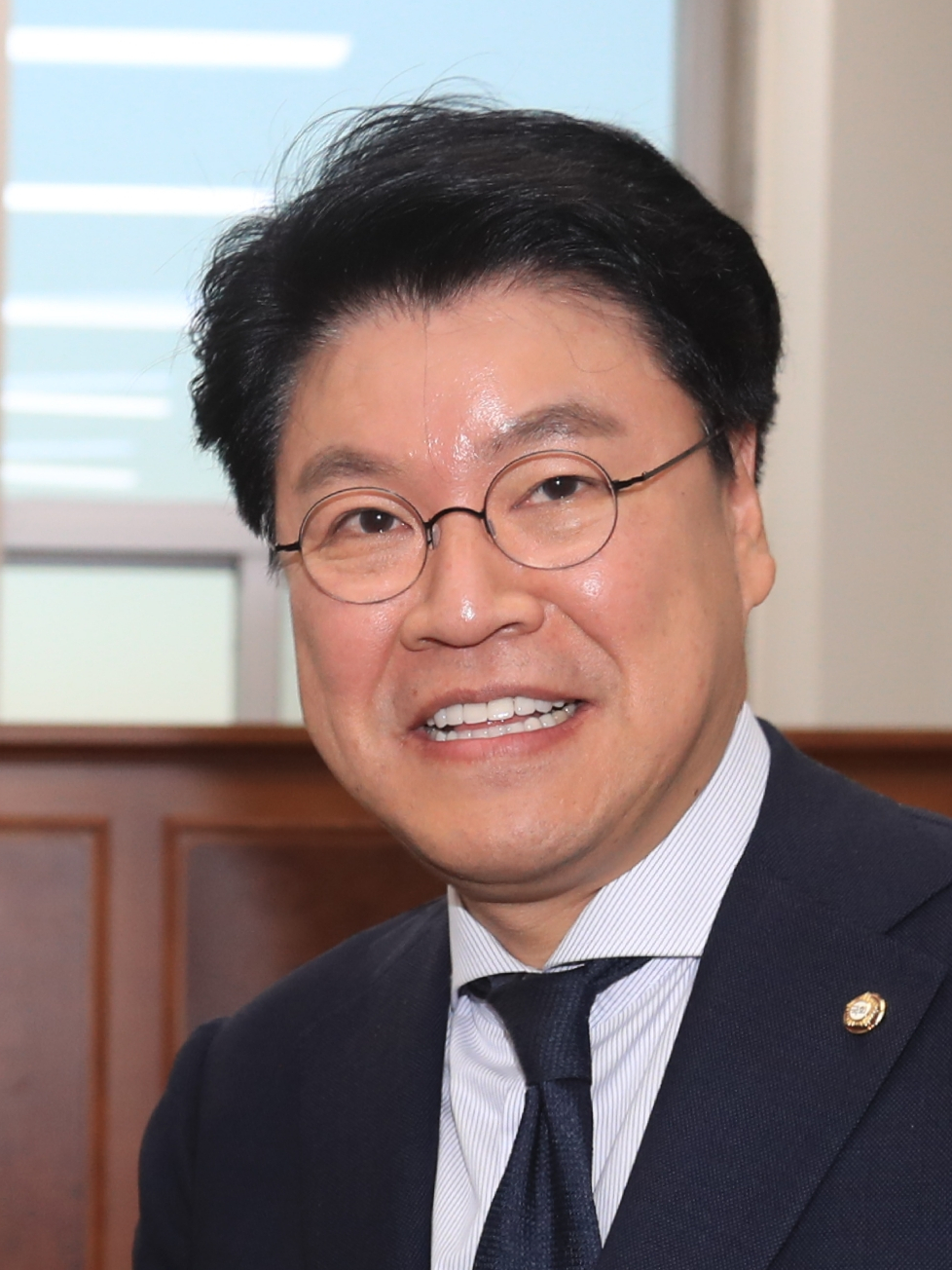
- Chang in 2018

Member of the National Assembly
- In office 30 May 2016 – 29 May 2024
- Preceded by: Moon Jae-in
- Succeeded by: Kim Dae-sik
- Constituency: Sasang (Busan)
- In office 30 May 2008 – 29 May 2012
- Preceded by: Kwon Cheol-hyun
- Succeeded by: Moon Jae-in
- Constituency: Sasang (Busan)

Personal details
- Born: 13 April 1967 Dongnae District, Busan, South Korea
- Died: 31 March 2025 (aged 57) Gangdong District, Seoul, South Korea
- Party: Independent
- Other political affiliations: GNP (2008–2012); Saenuri (2012–2016, 2016–2017); Independent (2016, 2017); Bareun (2017); LKP (2017–2020); UFP (2020); PPP (2020-2025)
- Spouse: Han Yoon-soon
- Children: Chang Yong-joon
- Parent(s): Jang Seong-man (father); Park Dong-soon (mother)
- Education: Chung-Ang University
- Occupation: Educator, politician

Korean name
- Hangul: 장제원
- RR: Jang Jewon
- MR: Chang Chewŏn

Chang Je-won (Korean: 장제원, 13 April 1967 – 31 March 2025) was a South Korean educator and conservative politician from the People Power Party (PPP). He served as a Member of the National Assembly for Sasang District for two terms, from 2008 to 2012 and again from 2016 to 2024.

== Early life and family background ==
Chang was born in Dongnae District, Busan, South Korea on 13 April 1967. His father, Jang Seong-man (1932–2015), was a pastor, educator who was the former chancellor of Dongseo University and also a politician serving as an MP of Democratic Justice Party, the predecessor of LKP, from 1981 to 1988 and was also the Deputy Speaker of the National Assembly from 1987 to 1988. His mother, Park Dong-soon (1939–), is an educator and the former president and the incumbent chancellor of Dongseo University. His brother, Chang Je-kuk (1964-), is the current president of the university. He also had a sister named Chang Ju-young.

He married Han Yoon-soon, former broadcaster of MBC and had a son named Chang Yong-joon (2000-), or known as NO:EL, a former contestant of High School Rapper and now as a hip-hop rapper and singer.

Chang studied at Dongrae Elementary School from his hometown, then moved to Seoul and continued his education at Yeouido Secondary School and Yeouido High School. After the graduation, he earned a bachelor's degree in Journalism and Broadcasting and also a master's degree in journalism and mass communication from Chung-Ang University.

== Political career ==
Chang was firstly elected for the National Assembly representing Sasang District in 2008 election, replacing the incumbent Kwon Cheol-hyun, who is also a father to Kwon Seong-ju. During the first MP career, he was a member of Public Administration and Security Committee, Steering Committee and Land, Transport and Maritime Affairs Committee. He also shortly served as the deputy parliamentary leader of Grand National Party, the predecessor of LKP, in June 2009.

He did not seek a second term in 2012 election. During this time, the ruling Saenuri Party underwent some conflicts in preselection, as the main opposition Democratic Unionist Party (DUP) selected Moon Jae-in, one of the potential presidential candidates at that time, for Sasang District. Instead of Chang, the Saenuri Party nominated Son Soo-joe, but was defeated by Moon.

Chang returned as an MP after the 2016 election. Originally, he intended to run under the Saenuri banner. After Son was re-selected, Chang left the party and won as a nonpartisan candidate. He then returned to the party on 21 June.

During the political scandal in the late 2016, Chang was one of hearing members from the Saenuri Party (LKP since February 2017) along with Kwon Seong-dong and Hwang Young-cheul. He then left the party with another 30 MPs and formed the Bareun Party. Nevertheless, prior to the presidential election in May 2017, he returned to the LKP and endorsed its presidential candidate, Hong Joon-pyo.

On 22 March 2018, Chang provoked a controversy when he called the police "government's hounds infected with rabies" after they launched an investigation related to Kim Ki-hyun, the then Mayor of Ulsan, who was also a member of the LKP. He also asked to "hit the mad dogs". Regarding this incident, several policemen condemned his statement and asked him to apologise.

In 2022, Chang served as chief-of-staff for president-elect Yoon Suk Yeol.

== Personal life ==
Chang also faced criticisms regarding his son, Chang Yong-joon (NO:EL), who was a contestant on the show High School Rapper. On 10 February 2017, NO:EL faced accusations of attempting to solicit prostitution via a Twitter account which he later confirmed did belong to him. It was also reported that his son was consuming cigarettes and alcohol underage. Chang apologised for his son's actions and resigned from all his positions within Bareun Party.

On 7 September 2019, NO:EL was caught by police in Seoul's Mapo District after his car hit a motorcycle. The police reported that NO:EL was driving while intoxicated with a blood alcohol concentration of 0.08%, a high enough level to lead to driving licence revocation. Chang apologised for this issue as well. The Justice Party urged him to resign as MP, but Chang did not do so and retained his position.

=== Sexual assault allegations ===
In 2025, Chang was accused of sexually assaulting his secretary in November 2015 when he was a university vice president in Busan. On 5 March, he announced his temporary resignation from the PPP while denying the accusation.

== Death ==
On 31 March 2025, Chang was found dead in his office in Gangdong District, Seoul, with police saying that a note was discovered at the scene. He was 57. The discovery came on the same day that his former secretary submitted evidence to police regarding her sexual assault complaint against Chang, which was automatically closed on account of his death.

== Election results ==
Year	Elections	Constituency	Political party	Votes (%)	Remarks
2008	18th National Assembly General Election	Sasang (Busan)	GNP	35,309 (45.48%)	Won
2016	20th National Assembly General Election	Sasang (Busan)	Independent	42,924 (37.50%)	Won
2020	21st National Assembly General Election	Sasang (Busan)	UFP	66,353 (52.03%)	Won

2008 South Korean legislative election : Sasang (Busan)
Party	Candidate	Votes	%
Grand National	Chang Je-won	35,039	45.48
Pro-Park	Kang Ju-man	28,485	36.97
Democratic Labor	Jo Cha-ri	12,096	15.70
Total votes		78,379	100.0
Grand National hold			

2016 South Korean legislative election : Sasang (Busan)
Party	Candidate	Votes	%
Independent	Chang Je-won	42,924	37.50
Democratic	Bae Jae-jung	41,005	35.87
Saenuri	Son Su-jo	30,463	26.61
Total votes		115,903	100.0
Independent gain from Saenuri			

2020 South Korean legislative election : Sasang (Busan)
Party	Candidate	Votes	%
United Future	Chang Je-won	66,353	52.03
Democratic	Bae Jae-jung	59,346	46.54
Total votes		129,101	100.0
United Future hold			
