= Bae Jae-jung =

South Korean politician

- 배재정

Secretary to the President for Political Affairs
- In office 1 September 2020 – 20 June 2021
- President: Moon Jae-in
- Preceded by: Kim Gwang-jin
- Succeeded by: Kim Han-kyu

Chief of Staff to the Prime Minister
- In office 12 June 2017 – 5 November 2018
- Prime Minister: Lee Nak-yeon
- Preceded by: Shim Oh-taek
- Succeeded by: Joung Wun-hyun

Member of the National Assembly
- In office 30 May 2012 – 29 May 2016
- Constituency: proportional representation

Personal details
- Born: 16 February 1968 (age 58) Busan, South Korea
- Party: Democratic
- Education: Busan National University
- Religion: Roman Catholicism

Bae Jae-jung (Korean: 배재정; Hanja: 裵在禎; born 16 February 1968) is a South Korean politician previously served as the Prime Minister Lee Nak-yeon's first chief of staff. She is the first woman to lead the Prime Minister's Secretariat (PMS) since its creation in 1960s.

Bae is one-term parliamentarian of now-ruling party, Democratic Party of Korea. During her term from 2012 to 2016, she took various roles in her party such as a member of Emergency Planning Commission in 2013, a spokesperson from 2013 to 2014 and vice-chair of Policy Committee from 2014 to 2015. Additionally, she worked as the deputy chief of staff to Moon Jae-in's first presidential campaign in 2012.

After then-parliamentarian Moon Jae-in was elected as the party leader and therefore announced that he will not seek for re-election in 2016 general election, she was chosen as a democratic candidate to replace him at the National Assembly. Unfortunately, she lost the election by less than 2,000 votes.

After serving as the chief of staff to Lee Nak-yeon, the first Prime Minister of President Moon Jae-in, she ran for the same constituency in the 2020 general election but lost again. In September 2020 she was brought back to the administration now serving as the President's secretary for political affairs.

Before entering politics, she worked as a Busan Ilbo's journalist for almost two decades from 1989 to 2007 and a ranking member of its trade union.

Bae holds a bachelor's degree in English language and literature and completed master's programme in arts, culture and videography from Busan National University in 1990 and 2012 respectively.

== Electoral history ==
Elections	Year	District	Party affiliation	Votes	Percentage of votes	Results
19th National Assembly General Election	2012	Proportional Representation (7th)	Democratic United Party	7,777,123	36.45%	Elected
20th National Assembly General Election	2016	Busan Sasang	Democratic Party	41,055	35.87%	Lost
21st National Assembly General Election	2020	Busan Sasang	Democratic Party	59,346	46.54%	Lost
22nd National Assembly General Election	2024	Busan Sasang	Democratic Party	56,659	47.36%	Lost

2016 South Korean legislative election : Sasang (Busan)
Party	Candidate	Votes	%
Independent	Chang Je-won	42,924	37.50
Democratic	Bae Jae-jung	41,005	35.87
Saenuri	Son Su-jo	30,463	26.61
Total votes		115,903	100.0
Independent gain from Saenuri			

2020 South Korean legislative election : Sasang (Busan)
Party	Candidate	Votes	%
United Future	Chang Je-won	66,353	52.03
Democratic	Bae Jae-jung	59,346	46.54
Total votes		129,101	100.0
United Future hold			

2024 South Korean legislative election: Sasang (Busan)
Party	Candidate	Votes	%	±%
People Power	Kim Dae-sik	62,975	52.63	▲0.6
Democratic	Bae Jae-jung	56,659	47.36	▲0.82
Rejected ballots		1,658	–	
Turnout		121,292	66.70	▼0.66
Registered electors		181,823		
People Power hold		Swing		
