= Moon Jae-in =

President of South Korea from 2017 to 2022

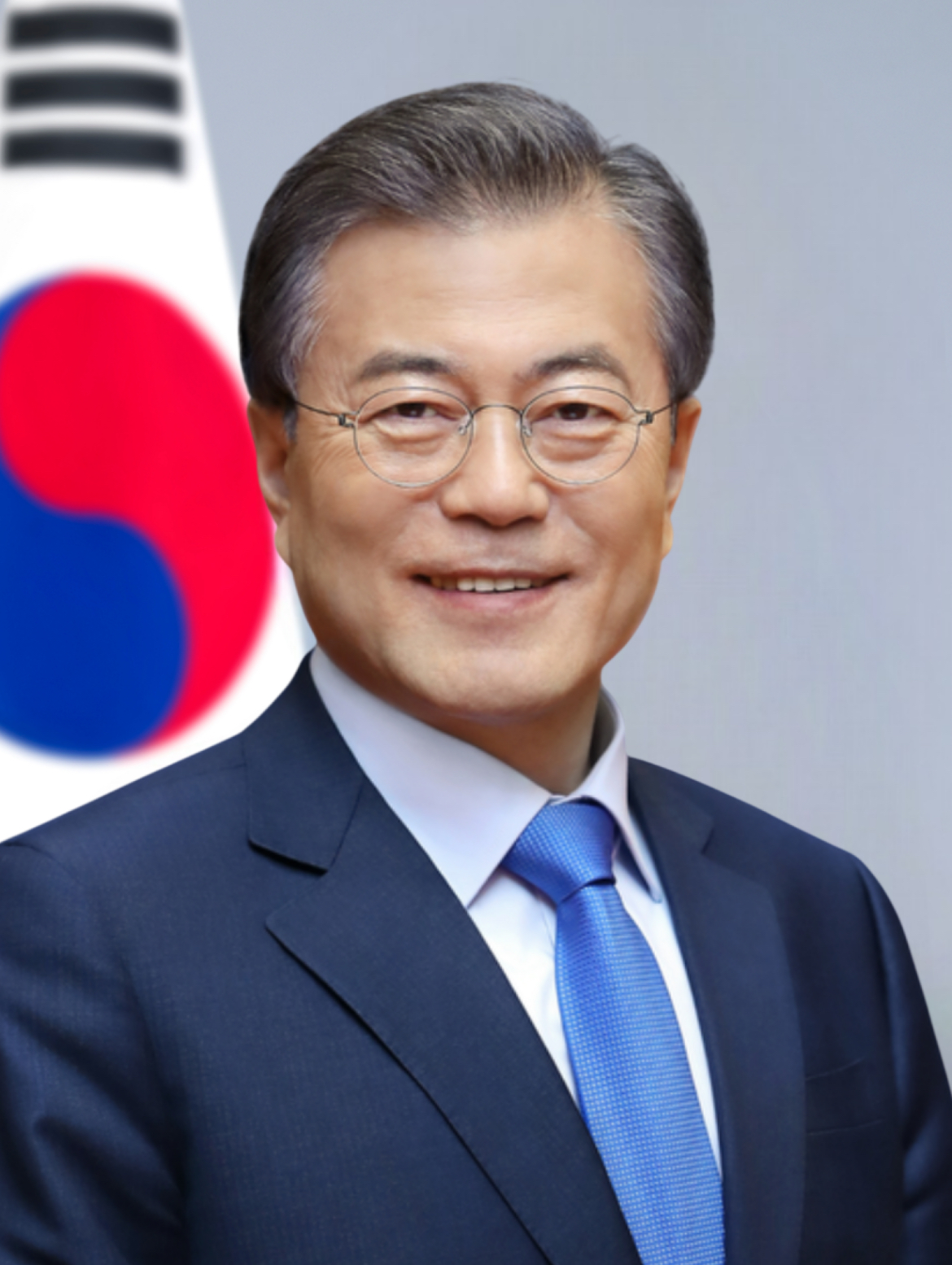
- Official portrait, 2017

12th President of South Korea
- In office 10 May 2017 – 9 May 2022
- Prime Minister: Hwang Kyo-ahn; Yoo Il-ho (acting); Lee Nak-yon; Chung Sye-kyun; Hong Nam-ki (acting); Kim Boo-kyum
- Preceded by: Park Geun-hye; Hwang Kyo-ahn (acting)
- Succeeded by: Yoon Suk Yeol

2nd Leader of the Democratic Party
- In office 9 February 2015 – 27 January 2016
- Preceded by: Kim Han-gil, Ahn Cheol-soo; Park Young-sun (ERC); Moon Hee-sang (interim)
- Succeeded by: Kim Chong-in (interim); Choo Mi-ae

Member of the National Assembly
- In office 30 May 2012 – 29 May 2016
- Preceded by: Chang Je-won
- Succeeded by: Chang Je-won
- Constituency: Sasang (Busan)

Chief of Staff to the President
- In office 12 March 2007 – 24 February 2008
- President: Roh Moo-hyun
- Prime Minister: Kwon O-kyu (acting); Han Duck-soo
- Preceded by: Lee Byung-wan
- Succeeded by: Yu Woo-ik

Personal details
- Born: 24 January 1953 (age 73) Geoje, South Gyeongsang, South Korea
- Party: Democratic (2015)
- Other political affiliations: MDP (2002–2003); Independent (2003–2006, 2007–2011); Uri (2006–2007); CUP (2011); DUP (2011–2013); Democratic (2013) (2013–2014); NPAD (2014–2015)
- Spouse: Kim Jung-sook (m. 1981)
- Children: 2
- Education: Kyung Hee University (LLB)
- Occupation: Politician; civil servant; lawyer
- Website: moonjaein.com 19president.pa.go.kr 19report.president.pa.go.kr

Military service
- Allegiance: South Korea
- Branch/service: Republic of Korea Army
- Years of service: 1975–1978
- Rank: Sergeant
- Unit: Army Special Warfare Command; 1st Special Forces Brigade (Airborne)
- Battles/wars: Operation Paul Bunyan (Note: Supporting role in the operation)

Korean name
- Hangul: 문재인
- Hanja: 文在寅
- RR: Mun Jaein
- MR: Mun Chaein
- IPA: [mun.dʑɛ.in]

Moon Jae-in (Korean: 문재인, pronounced [mun.dʑɛ.in]; born 24 January 1953) is a South Korean politician and lawyer who served as the 12th President of South Korea from 2017 to 2022. A member of the Democratic Party of Korea (DPK), he was the party's leader from 2015 to 2016, and represented Sasang in the National Assembly from 2012 to 2016. Moon previously served as the senior secretary for civil affairs and the chief of staff to President Roh Moo-hyun.

Born in Geoje to North Korean refugees, Moon was raised in poverty in Busan. He excelled in school and studied law at Kyung Hee University. He became a lawyer and was involved in human rights activism with Roh Moo-hyun. He was imprisoned for organizing a protest against the Yushin Constitution. As a result of his work in human rights law, Moon was chosen to be Roh's campaign manager in the 2002 presidential election. He served in Roh's administration in various official capacities. In 2012, Moon was a candidate for the Democratic United Party in the 2012 presidential election, which he lost to Park Geun-hye.

In the 2017 presidential election, Moon was elected president as the Democratic Party of Korea candidate after Park Geun-hye was impeached and removed from office. As president, Moon received international attention for his meetings with North Korean leader Kim Jong Un at inter-Korean summits in April, May, and September 2018, making him the third South Korean president to meet their North Korean counterpart. On June 30, 2019, he met with both Kim and U.S. president Donald Trump at the Korean Demilitarized Zone (DMZ). During his presidency, Moon favored the Sunshine Policy, a peaceful approach to Korean reunification. On economic policy, he favored reform of chaebols (conglomerates), raised the minimum wage by more than 16%, and lowered the maximum workweek from 68 to 52 hours. Moon received praise domestically and internationally for his handling of the COVID-19 pandemic in South Korea. His party won a historic victory in the 2020 South Korean legislative election. However, his party lost the next presidential election, making him the first president since South Korea's democratization in 1987 to transfer power to the opposition after a single term. He left office in May 2022, succeeded by his former prosecutor general, Yoon Suk Yeol.

== Early life, education, and military service ==
Moon Jae-in was born in Geoje, South Korea, on January 24, 1953, shortly before the end of the Korean War, as the second child and oldest son among five children of father Moon Yong-hyung and mother Kang Han-ok. His parents were refugees from South Hamgyong Province, North Korea who fled their native city of Hungnam in the Hungnam evacuation during the Korean War. His father worked as head of the agriculture department that detained food, especially the rice of Korean colonial people, as one of the main tasks in Heungnam, Hamju, South Hamgyong Province.

His family eventually settled in Busan. Since his father did not want to become a government employee as he had been in North Korea, he started a business selling socks, which left his family in great debt. His mother became the main earner by selling clothes received from relief organizations and delivering briquettes. Moon's family became attached to the Catholic Church when his mother went to the local cathedral to receive whole milk powder. Moon once said in an interview that he did not know how to ride a bike since his family was too poor to afford a bike or a monthly school tuition.

Moon entered Kyungnam High School and reportedly placed at the top of his class. He was accepted to study law at Kyung Hee University with a full scholarship. At university, he met his future wife, Kim Jung-sook. After organizing a student protest against the Yushin Constitution, he was arrested, convicted, imprisoned at Seodaemun Prison, and expelled from the university. Later, he was conscripted into the military and assigned to the 1st Special Forces Brigade, where he participated in "Operation Paul Bunyan" during the axe murder incident in Panmunjom.

After his honorable discharge, the death of his father motivated him to study for the bar exam. He stayed at the Buddhist temple of Daeheungsa to study for the exam and passed the first of two rounds in 1979. In 1980, he returned to Kyung Hee University to complete the remainder of his studies. Later that year, he passed the second round of the bar exam and was admitted to the Judicial Research and Training Institute. He graduated from the Institute ranked second in his class but was not appointed a judge or prosecutor due to his history of student activism against the Yushin dictatorship under Park Chung Hee. Moon then chose to go into private practice instead.

== Early career ==
=== Human rights lawyer ===
After becoming a lawyer, he worked under future president Roh Moo-hyun in the 1980s. Along with Roh, he took cases involving the labor rights issues and became renowned for his work in human rights. As a member of the Busan Bar Association, Moon investigated the child labor camp known as the Brothers Home.

He was a founding member of the progressive South Korean newspaper, The Hankyoreh, in 1988.

=== Roh Moo-hyun administration ===
Yielding to Roh's insistence, Moon became Roh's campaign manager during his presidential bid. After Roh's victory, Moon became Roh's close aide holding various roles in a presidential administration. Moon held roles as Senior Presidential Secretary for Civil Affairs, Senior Presidential Secretary for Civil Society and Chief Presidential Secretary from 2003 to 2008.

When the National Assembly voted to impeach Roh on violating election laws in 2004, Moon led the legal delegation for Roh at the Constitutional Court and won the case.

Moon, as Roh's chief of staff, led the preparation committee of the 2nd Inter-Korean Summit but did not attend the summit. Moon served as the chief mourner and the head of the funeral committee when Roh died by suicide after the latter was embroiled in a high-profile corruption and bribery investigation in May 2009, which deeply affected Moon. He reportedly held then-President Lee Myung-bak politically responsible for Roh's death, an accusation he denied when Lee publicly accused Moon of orchestrating a political vendetta after the Moon administration launched anti-corruption investigations into Lee once in power.

== Political career before the presidency ==
=== Entry to politics ===
Despite his earlier indifference, he began to get involved in politics. He published a memoir called Moon Jae-in: The Destiny which became a bestseller. His popularity had been rising steadily against his likely opponent in the presidential race, Park Geun-hye. In a February 2012 poll, Moon rivaled Park in popularity.

Moon managed to capitalize on the conservatives' decline in popularity amid a series of corruption scandals. As one pundit said, "Moon had managed to portray himself as a moderate and rational leader who has the backing of the younger generation".

=== 2012 general election ===
In 2012, Moon entered a bid for a seat in the National Assembly in the 19th legislative election. Moon won a seat in the Sasang District of Busan on April 11, 2012, as a member of the Democratic United Party with 55% of the vote. As of 2021, Sasang District belongs to the Conservative Party.

=== 2012 presidential campaign ===
On September 16, 2012, Moon received the presidential nomination for the Democratic United Party.

He ran for the 2012 presidential election as the Democratic United Party's candidate in a three-way race against Park Geun-hye, the incumbent ruling party's candidate and daughter of the late president Park Chung Hee, as well as independent software mogul Ahn Cheol-soo. Ahn dropped out of the race and endorsed Moon after polls showed a most likely definitive loss for both candidates were there to be a three-way race against Park. Moon went on to lose the election.

=== Leader of the Democratic Party ===
Moon was elected as the leader of New Politics Alliance for Democracy (NPAD) on February 2, 2015. Prior to his election, Moon and NPAD party leader and 2012 presidential candidate rival Ahn Cheol-soo had many public disputes over the direction of the party.

Moon's official role led Ahn Cheol-soo to quit and form the centrist People's Party. Ahn's departure and Moon's new tenure as party leader led to renaming the liberal, NPAD Party as the new Democratic Party.

During his leadership, Moon scouted several politically prominent people, including police studies/criminology expert Pyo Chang-won, political critic Lee Chul-hee, and former president Park's secretary Cho Ung-chun to prepare for upcoming 2016 legislative elections. After his recruitment, Moon resigned his position for another scouted advisor/former Park advisor Kim Chong-in.

== 2017 presidential election ==
=== Primary and general election ===
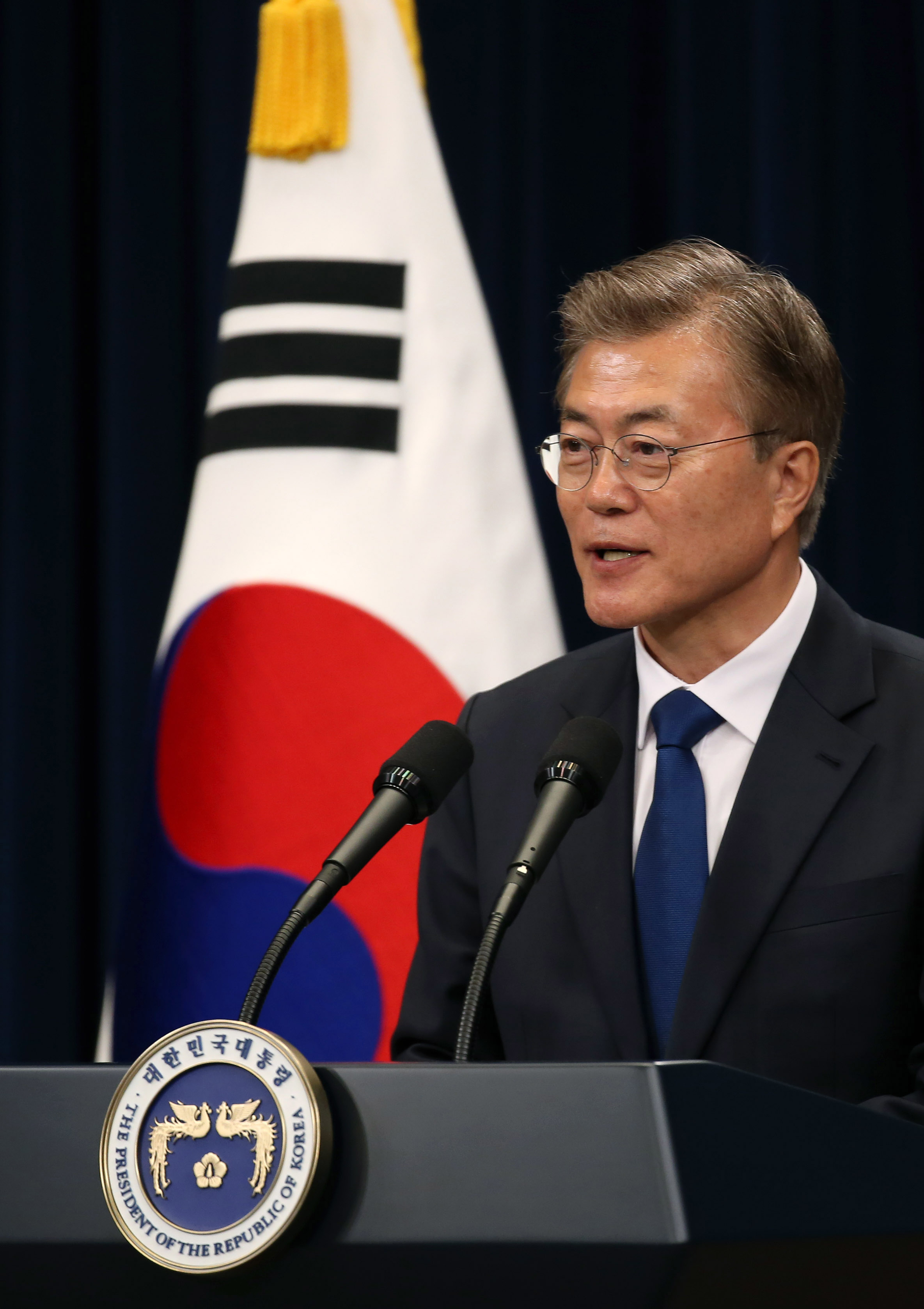
Moon at his first press conference as president in 2017

Moon was considered the frontrunner to win Korea's 2017 presidential election, which would be the 19th term of the country's presidency, following the impeachment and removal of Park Geun-hye. The election had originally been scheduled for December 2017, but was brought forward to May 2017 in order to ensure that they would take place within 60 days of Park's removal, as required by the Constitution.

He won the Democratic Party's nomination against fellow party members Ahn Hee-jung, Lee Jae-myung, and Choi Sung with 57% of the votes.

The general election originally had 15 announced candidates. Moon faced four other major party nominees during the election, including 2012 presidential rival and past party colleague Ahn Cheol-soo of the People's Party and Hong Jun-pyo of the Liberty Korea Party. He was elected the 19th president of South Korea in Korea's 19th presidential election by a large plurality over two.

On May 10, 2017, Moon won the election with a plurality of 41.1% votes (out of 13,423,800 votes nationwide). As Moon was elected in a special election, he did not have the usual 60-day transition period of previous administrations but was instead inaugurated the day after the election.

=== Campaign positions on domestic policy ===
==== Economic policy ====
Moon's campaign promises in 2017 included intentions to put a 10 trillion won ($8.9 billion) fiscal stimulus to support job creation, start-ups, and small to mid-sized companies. His announced goal is to create 810,000 public sector jobs through raising taxes on the wealthy.

Moon's policy against corporate corruption, specifically in regard to Korean conglomerates known as "chaebols " is to give "minority shareholders more power in electing board members" of the companies.

==== Transparency ====
Moon also promised transparency in his presidency, moving the presidential residence from the palatial and isolated Blue House to an existing government complex in downtown Seoul.

==== Homophobia controversy ====
Moon was criticized for homophobic comments he made in a televised presidential debate for the 2017 presidential election, where Moon said he opposed homosexuality, in response to conservative candidate Hong Jun-pyo's remarks that gay soldiers were a source of weakness in the South Korean military. Moon's remark prompted immediate criticism during the debate from Sim Sang-jung, the sole presidential candidate to support LGBT rights and a member of the left wing Justice Party. The discriminatory remark also prompted outrage from gay rights activists, with some finding it especially unacceptable considering Moon being the leading liberal candidate and a former human rights lawyer. Some of Moon's supporters dismissed the comments as a tactic to win, as South Koreans tend to be conservative on social issues. Moon later backtracked on his original comments, clarifying that he believes there should be no discrimination based on sexual orientation, while at the same time opposing legalizing same-sex marriage.

=== Campaign positions on foreign policy ===
Moon has favored a peaceful reunification between the two Koreas. He was both widely criticized and widely praised for his comments stating that his first visit if elected president would be to visit North Korea, a visit that would be not unlike Roh Moo-hyun's visit to the country in 2007. Similarly, Moon's foreign policy towards North Korea is considered to closely align with the Sunshine Policy embraced by former liberal presidents Kim Dae-jung and Roh Moo-hyun.

His 2017 presidential campaign has supported re-opening of the Kaesong industrial park.

Moon's relatively liberal stance in foreign policy is reflected as he is quoted in a book: "I'm pro-U.S., but now South Korea should adopt diplomacy in which it can discuss a U.S. request and say no to the Americans." He opposes a re-balance of the security alliance with the United States, but has also stated that he would like South Korea "to be able to take the lead on matters on the Korean Peninsula." At the same time, Moon has stated that he considers America as a "friend" for its role in helping South Korea avoid communism while helping its economic growth.

== Presidency (2017–2022) ==
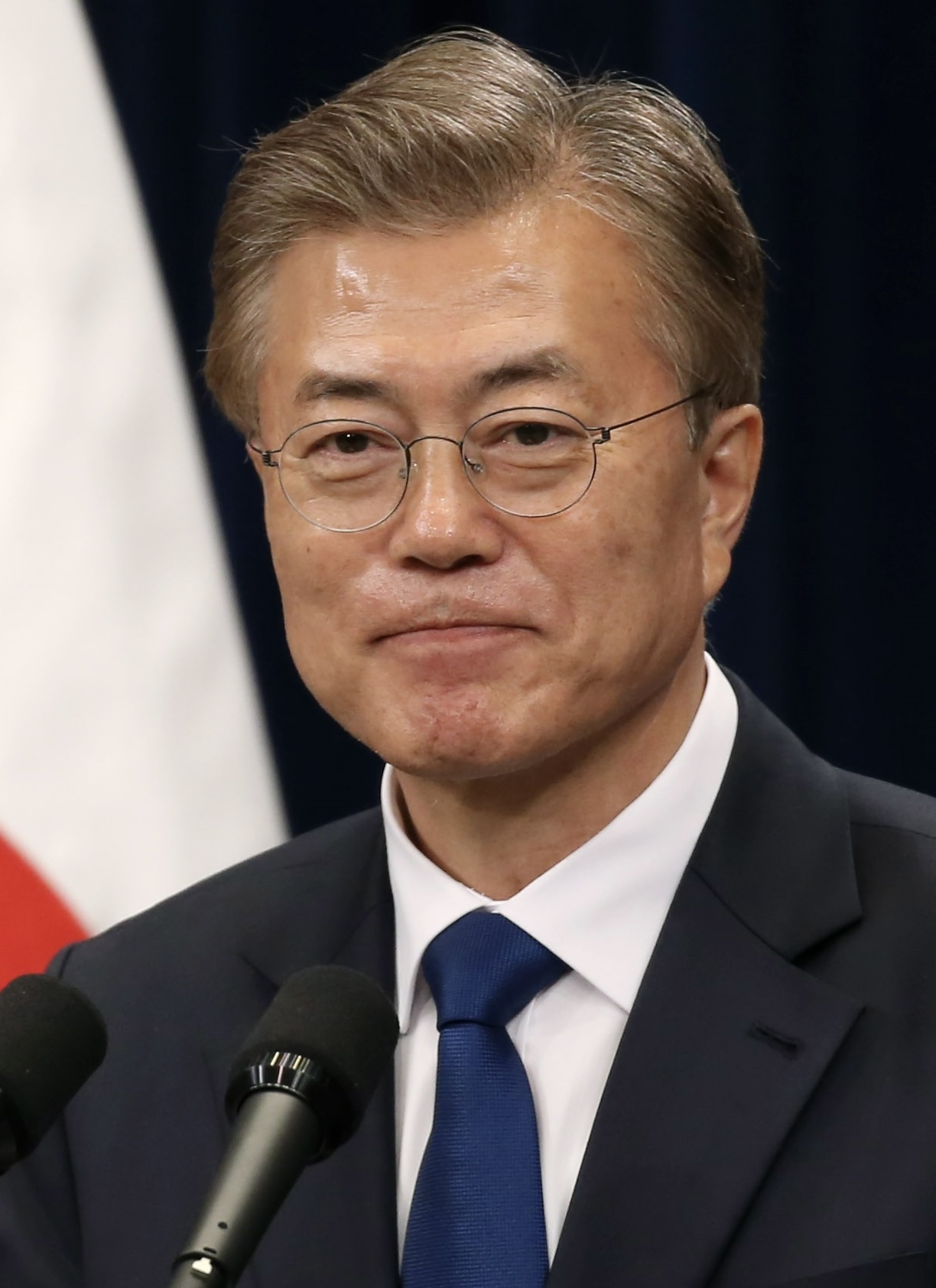
- Presidency of Moon Jae-in; May 10, 2017 – May 10, 2022
- Prime Minister: Yoo Il-ho (acting); Lee Nak-yon; Chung Sye-kyun; Hong Nam-ki (acting); Kim Boo-kyum
- Cabinet: Full list
- Party: Democratic
- Election: 2017
- Seat: Seoul

Moon Jae-in's presidential Job Approval rating

Moon was sworn into office immediately after official votes were counted on 10 May 2017, replacing Acting President and Prime Minister Hwang Kyo-ahn. There was no transition period between the election and inauguration, unlike other presidential elections due to the nature of an election following a presidential impeachment and removal of his predecessor, Park Geun-hye. He served out the typical single five-year term with his presidential term concluding in 2022.

President Moon and his government has been widely described as left-wing or liberal by media.

On 15 August 2019, coinciding with Liberation Day, large-scale flag rallies occurred in central Seoul, including Seoul Station, City Hall Plaza, Daehanmun, and the outer ring of Gwanghwamun Plaza, calling to impeach Moon Jae-in. Protests were also held on 3 October, the national foundation day.

=== Domestic policy ===
Fiscal policy stance

According to the 2017-2021 National Fiscal Management Plan, the Moon Jae-in administration projected that the South Korean economy would achieve improved growth driven by exports and investment. However, it pointed out that the income polarization problem intensified while South Korea achieved growth in the past. To solve the income inequality, it was urgent to switch to a new economic paradigm. Moon Jae In administration emphasized the active role of government finance to achieve the goal of a “people-centered, sustainable growth economy”. This led to an expansionary fiscal policy stance. This was implemented as 'income-led growth', which was the core economic policy of the Moon Jae In administration. The Moon administration diagnosed that the proportion of corporate income in the national economy has increased due to the corporate-centered economic policy, while the proportion of household income has decreased significantly. As a result, the imbalance, such as the income gap between companies and households, the corporate income gap between large and small companies, and the wage income gap between workers, has deepened. The income-led growth policy was aimed at increasing the income of households to achieve economic growth.

The policy consisted of three pillars: increasing household income, expanding social safety nets and welfare, and investing in people. First, it planned to raise the minimum wage and expand ‘earned income tax credit’ to improve the income of low-wage workers. Policies to support self-employed small business owners were also initiated by reducing card fees and rent. Second, welfare expansion such as basic pension for the elderly, pension for the disabled, children's allowance, and basic living security was initiated. Third, the government sought to strengthen human capacity by reducing blind spots in employment insurance and strengthening unemployment benefit coverage. According to the Performance and Tasks of Income-led growth report, the proportion of low-wage workers has decreased since 2018, largely due to minimum wage increases. Wage disparities in the labor market based on gender, employment type, and company size have also shown improvement. Notably, the ‘labor income share’ increased by 5.5%, representing the most significant increase compared to previous administrations. Also income distribution indicators improved due to the improvement of the basic living security system, the increase in the basic pension, and the establishment of child allowances. In addition, the number of employment insurance policyholders continued to increase, helping to reduce blind spots.

The expansionary fiscal stance was also reflected in the 'Korean-style fiscal rules' announced in 2020. The purpose is to secure fiscal sustainability, but government spending is set to be flexibly expanded in times of crisis rather than applying strict fiscal rules. In situations where the role of finance is required, the direction of implementation was specified to actively respond to changes in economic and financial conditions with bold financial support from the government. An exception was included for national disasters or economic crises necessitating significant fiscal expenditure, with management indicators to be gradually reapplied over four years once the exceptional circumstances subside. The formula for calculating the fiscal management limit also reflects a relatively flexible fiscal stance. Rather than a simple and strict limit regulation, management indicators were designed through a calculation formula that considers both ‘national debt’ and the ‘Consolidated Fiscal Balance’. For example, if ‘National Debt as a Percentage of GDP’ exceeds the initial target threshold of 60%, the framework permits adjustments, such as reducing the ‘consolidated fiscal balance’ of the initial target threshold of -3%, to ensure compliance. Furthermore, the legal basis was planned to be included in the 'enforcement decree', which is less legally binding than the law.

==== Chaebol reform ====
South Korea's economic growth has been attributed in large part to Chaebols, or family-owned conglomerates. Prominent examples of conglomerates include Samsung and Hyundai, concentrated power (collusion), connections with the government including most recently the 2016 Choi Soon-sil scandal which ultimately led to the special election Moon won. Moon subsequently appointed "chaebol sniper" Kim Sang-jo, a well-known shareholder activist, to the role of fair-trade commissioner aimed at reforming chaebols.

==== Tech policy ====
As President, Moon signed into law an amendment to the Telecommunications Business Act that has been referred to as the "Anti-Google Law". The legislation prohibits Apple and Google, which operate the App Store and Google Play Store, respectively, from requiring app developers on these platforms to use their payment systems to sell their products. As a result, app developers will be able to avoid paying commission to Apple or Google by directing customers to pay through alternate platforms.

==== Health care policy ====
Moon's health care policy included the benefit coverage expansion in National Health Insurance.

==== Prosecution reform ====
Prosecution reform was implemented to rearrange the prosecution and its investigation right and to rebuild the corrupt prosecution.

So far, the prosecution has had both investigation rights, and accusation rights and it leads to vastly over-concentrated power.

So, the main purpose of coordinating the prosecution and police investigation rights is to weaken the accusation right of the prosecution.

It was started under the Moon Jae-in administration by former Ministers of Justice such as Cho Guk, Choo Mi-ae, and Park Beom-gye. Yoon Suk Yeol, who was the president, also participated as former Prosecutor General.

As part of the process, the Corruption Investigation Office for high-ranking officials was established, and the backlash from the prosecution was very strong.

Against this 'power rearrange' process, some executives of prosecution withdrew their seats as a sign of resistance.

In addition, through coordinating the prosecution and police investigation rights, the ruling party tried to shift the power of the prosecution to others.

Like the time the Corruption Investigation Office For High-ranking Officials was established, high-ranking officials of the prosecution again resigned as a sign of resistance against coordinating the prosecution and police investigation rights.

As a result, the power of the prosecution weakened compared to the past, by the prosecution reform during the Moon Jae-in administration.

Still there are some limitations. As the opposition party interrupted the related legislation process, it took more time than usual and some of the core part of the prosecution reform was revised.

==== Capital punishment ====
Moon opposed efforts to re-implement capital punishment.

==== Investigation of labor abuses ====
Moon approved of a bill passed in April 2020 to investigate labor abuses in the work camp known as Brothers Home, which he investigated as a lawyer in 1987.

==== Unemployment ====
In January 2019, South Korea's unemployment rate hit 4.5%, the highest number observed for the month of January since 2010, while the youth unemployment rate, which tracks Koreans aged 25–34 who have not secured jobs, reached its highest in South Korea in 19 years. According to Statistics Korea, 338,000 young Koreans were unemployed in July 2018. The number is the highest since youth unemployment marked 434,000 in 1999, as the nation was still recovering from the 1997 Asian financial crisis. Some experts said the current Moon Jae-in government's purportedly pro-labor policies, including the raise in minimum wage, which led The Wall Street Journal to call President Moon Jae-In's economic program "Asia's most radical left-wing", and reduction of maximum weekly work hours from 68 to 52, may be contributors to the increasing number of Koreans unable to find jobs.

In November 2018, the Financial Times reported that President Moon Jae-In replaced Kim Dong-yeon, finance minister, by Hong Nam-ki, an economic policy official currently serving in the prime minister's office, and Jang Ha-sung, presidential chief of staff for policy. The reshuffle sets the stage for new economic ideas "in a nation that is struggling to transition away from its once-successful manufacturing model".

As of December 2021, the unemployment rate was down to 3.7%, the lowest since 2017 and in line with the unemployment rate of the previous two decades.

==== Minimum wage ====
Moon's government launched a series of minimum wage hikes. One of these was in 2018, which raised the minimum wage by 16.4% from the previous year to 7,530 won (US$6.65) an hour. In a 2018 report, the NGO Oxfam cited South Korea as one of the few countries in Asia to have made efforts to reduce inequality that year.

==== Maximum hour work week ====
The maximum hour work week was reduced from 68 to 52. In October 2018, a study conducted by a telecommunications firm found that in central Seoul the amount of time people spent in or near their workplace fell by 55 minutes, and time spent of leisure activities went up in residential areas. However, they found little to no change elsewhere in the country. Bars and restaurants in central Seoul reported a loss in business.

==== Housing ====
Moon's housing policy focused heavily on curbing real estate speculation and protecting tenants, largely through tightening mortgage regulations, raising property taxes and capping rental prices. However, these demand-side interventions severely restricted housing supply, causing home prices in Seoul to surge by more than 50% during his tenure. The prolonged crisis sapped public support for Moon and his inability to tame rising housing costs became one of the defining failures of his presidency, ultimately shifting voter sentiment and paving the way for conservative leadership in subsequent elections.

==== Education ====
Moon's predecessor and daughter of Park Chung Hee, Park Geun-hye, originally planned to mandate usage of state-issued history textbooks in 2018. Moon reversed those plans in May 2017 in one of his first major acts as president. Critics of Park's original plan saw this as a way for Park to mitigate some representations of her father's oppressive policies under a dictatorial rule, only highlighting the positive accomplishments of the past. Park previously stated in 2015 that she wanted to replace the "left-leaning" books with those created from the government that would instill greater patriotism. Although the Park government responded to subsequent backlash by switching from its official position of requiring the textbooks to be used, to allowing schools the choice to use them, Moon's action scrapped the program altogether. Schools continued using privately published, government-approved textbooks written under educational guidelines instead.

==== Animal rights and dog meat ====
During his campaign, Moon promised to adopt a dog from an animal sanctuary; this was considered relevant to South Korean politics, as the country allows for consumption of dog meat. He adopted Tory, a four-year-old black mongrel saved from a dog meat farm, from an animal rights group. The move was considered as sending "a strong message against the dog meat trade".

==== Energy ====
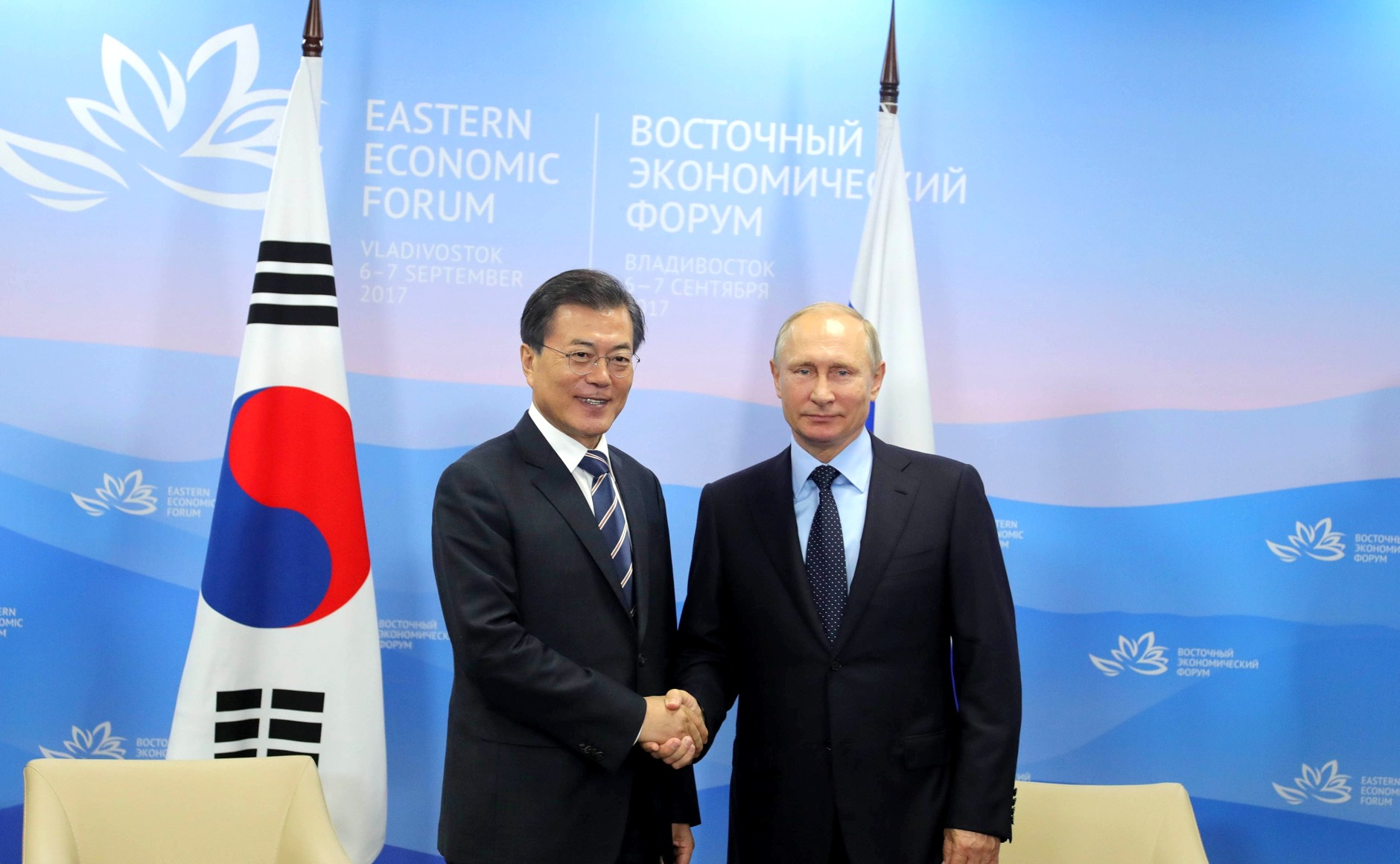
Moon meets with Russian president Vladimir Putin at the Eastern Economic Forum in Vladivostok, Russia, September 6, 2017

Moon's administration focused on increasing South Korea's consumption of natural gas, away from nuclear and coal as sources of energy. These plans include delaying construction on nuclear reactors as well as re-opening dialogue around a natural gas pipeline that would come from Russia and pass through North Korea. At the event on June 19, 2017, marking the end of operations at South Korea's oldest nuclear reactor, Kori Unit 1, Moon outlined his plan for the future of energy in Korea, saying "we will abandon the development policy centered on nuclear power plants and exit the era of nuclear energy." This would be implemented by canceling plans for new nuclear power plants and not renewing licenses for operating plants. In addition, he shut down eight coal-fired power plants upon assuming office in May 2017, and pledged to shut down the remaining ten coal plants by the end of his term. In the long term, he envisioned renewable sources would eventually be able to meet Korea's demand, but in the interim, proposed liquefied natural gas (LNG) as a stopgap measure while coal and nuclear were taken offline in the coming decades.

==== COVID-19 pandemic ====
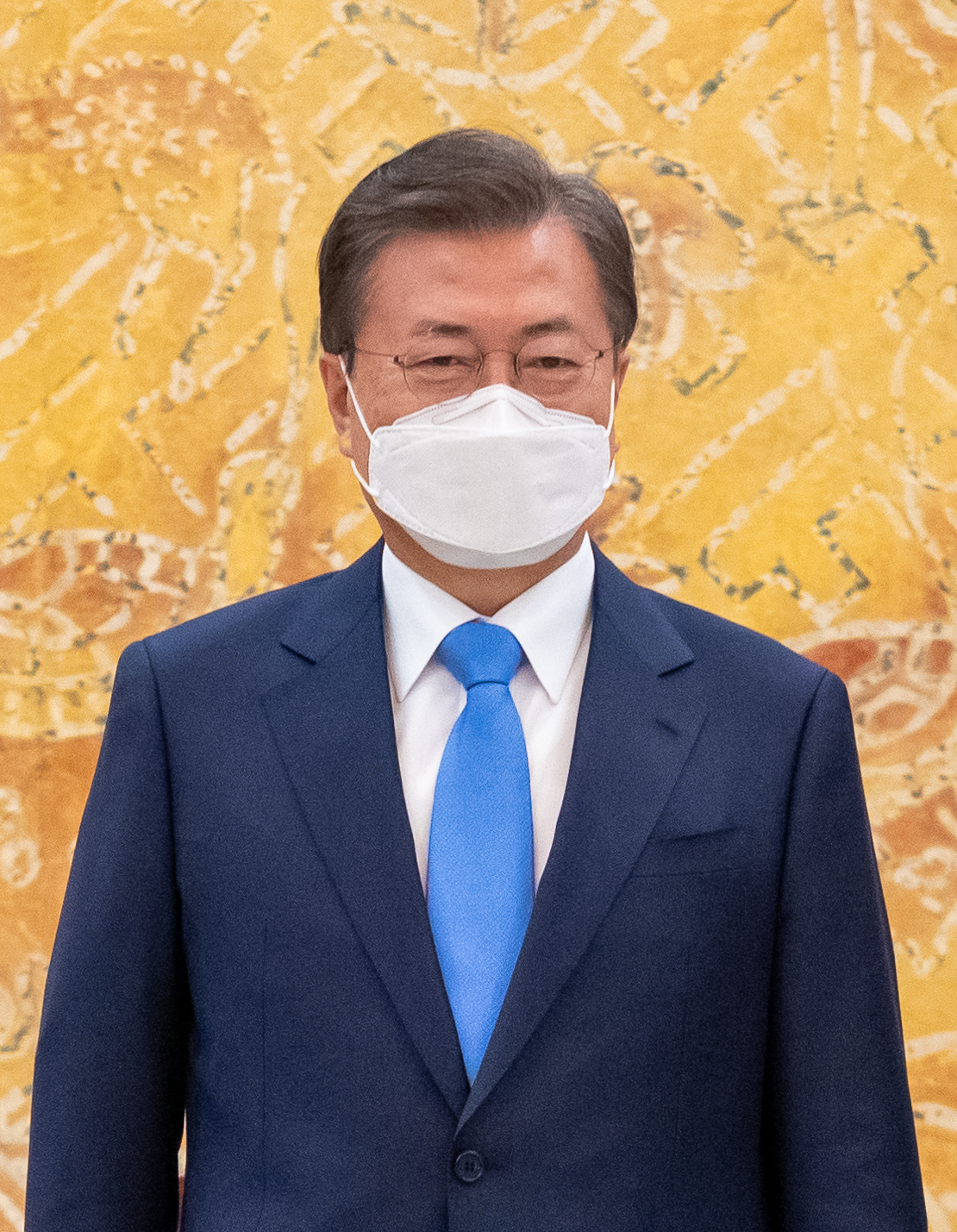
Moon wearing a protective mask in March 2021

Moon's response to the COVID-19 pandemic has been praised both domestically and internationally. In the first few weeks of March 2020, daily cases fell from 800 to fewer than 100, reducing daily cases by more than 90% at its peak.

However, more than 1.5 million South Koreans signed a petition to impeach Moon over what they claimed was the government's initial mishandling of the coronavirus outbreak in South Korea. In response, more than 1.3 million South Koreans signed a second petition in just two weeks to support Moon over what they claimed was the government's capable control of the coronavirus.

An opinion poll conducted between 5–6 March 2020 by Embrain, a public polling company, showed that 53% of the public had a positive evaluation of Moon's handling of the COVID-19 pandemic in South Korea. An opinion poll by Gallup Korea in the first week of March 2020 showed his approval rating rose from 44% to 67%, due to public's approval of his administration's handling of the outbreak. By January 2021, according to a Realmeter survey, his approval rating decreased to 34%, the lowest point during his presidency.

According to the Yonhap News Agency, James Kim, the Chairman of the American Chamber of Commerce in Korea stated that "Korea is proactively and transparently dealing with COVID-19. The confirmed cases are surging in Korea, due to the country's well-prepared testing procedures compared to other countries." CNBC's Matt McCarthy, a New York City doctor, praised Moon's government work on solving the coronavirus crisis, stating that "South Korea had been able to test tens of thousands of people. With the country's aggressive testing efforts, Korea's death toll from the disease is less than 1%, while the global average is 3.4%. This is thanks to the government's early preparation for the outbreak of infectious diseases."

In 2020, although a spike in new coronavirus cases in South Korea prompted authorities to reimpose tighter social distancing curbs in Seoul, there were thousands of demonstrators protesting against Moon Jae-in's policies. Police said that they would probe all participants of demonstrations held in downtown Seoul to look into whether they violated a court decision related to COVID-19 and other regulations. On October 3 the national foundation day, conservative groups held drive-thru anti-government rallies in southern Seoul, amid concerns about the spread of COVID.

==== LGBT rights ====
Moon opposes same-sex marriage. In a 2017 presidential television debate, he openly declared that he opposes homosexuality in some forms.

Speaking to Buddhist and Christian religious leaders in October 2019, Moon said, "A national consensus should be the priority for same-sex marriage. However, regarding the human rights of sexual minorities, they should not be socially persecuted or discriminated against."

In July 2020, the proposal of South Korea's first comprehensive anti-discrimination law, which would provide legal protection for minority communities, including the LGBTQ community, did not receive any open support from Moon. However, in December 2020, in a special report by the National Human Rights Commission of Korea, Moon emphasized the necessity of enacting the Equality Act in the country.

Human Rights Watch, in their Word Report 2020, called on the Korean government to take note of the urgent need for protecting the rights of Korea's lesbian, gay, bisexual and transgender community. "President Moon Jae-in, who started his legal career fighting for human rights, is in several ways failing to promote them now," said John Sifton, Asia advocacy director at Human Rights Watch. In 2020, he and his government need to reverse course and prioritize human rights in South Korea, North Korea, and worldwide.

=== 2020 legislative election and subsequent reforms ===
Moon's Democratic Party won 163 constituency seats, while their satellite Platform party won 17 proportional representation seats, giving the alliance a total of 180 seats in the 300-seat assembly, enough to reach the three-fifths super-majority required to fast-track assembly procedures and "do everything but revising the Constitution at the parliament." This was the largest majority for any party since democracy was restored in 1987. The United Future Party and their satellite Future Korea Party won 84 constituency and 19 proportional seats respectively; their total of 103 seats (34.3%) was the worst conservative result since the 1960 legislative elections.

Subsequently, with its new three-fifths majority, the Democratic Party implemented a series of reforms and were approved by the National Assembly in December 2020 including:

- removal of the National Intelligence Service (NIS)'s involvement in domestic intelligence and activities and transferring of such powers to the National Police Agency
- Revisions to the 18 May Special Act, penalizing those involved in making false factual claims regarding the 1980 Gwangju Uprising
- Revisions to the Inter-Korean Relations Act, penalizing sending of flyers to North Korea via balloons launched near the demilitarized zone
- Revisions to the Labor Standards Act, setting the maximum work week to 52 hours a week, including overtime while allowing a business to exceed the 52-hour limit by giving an extended paid vacation for workers.
- guaranteed paid parental leave for temporary workers
- expansions to the range of workers who can participate in unions and raising the maximum duration of a collective bargaining agreement from two years to three years.
- re-establishment of the Truth and Reconciliation Commission.
- launch of the new Corruption Investigation Office for High-ranking Officials and stripping the opposition's right to veto appointments of a new agency head.
- establishment of local policing, allowing each city and province to establish its own autonomous police force instead of a single national police force.
- establishment of a new National Bureau of Investigation, quasi-independent and insulated from the National Police Agency.

=== Foreign policy ===
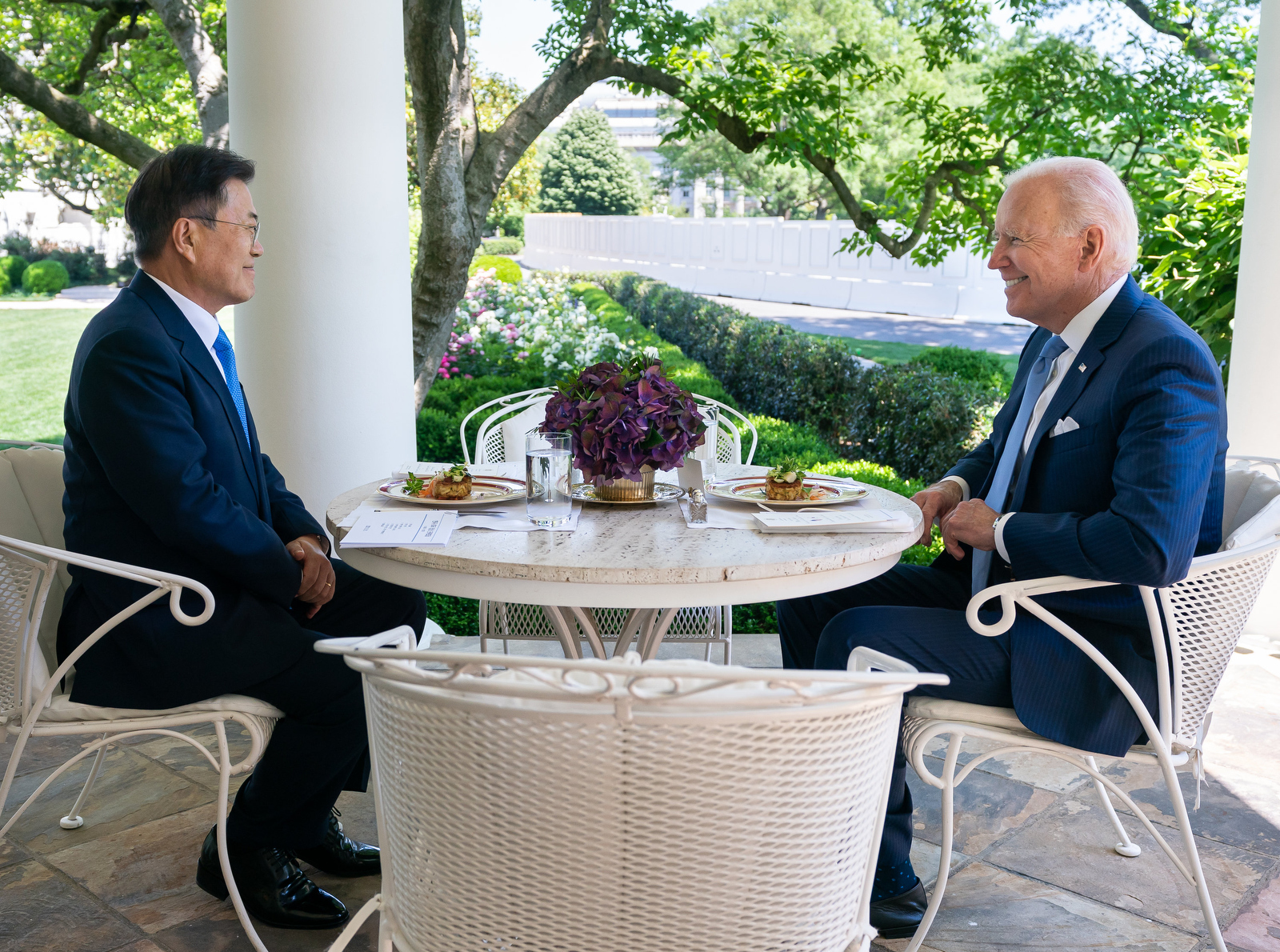
Moon with U.S. president Joe Biden in May 2021

==== United States ====
Moon visited the United States to meet with U.S. President Donald Trump in June 2017, discussing U.S.-Korea trade relations as well as North Korea's missile programs. Moon revealed in a joint news conference that President Trump accepted an invitation to visit South Korea.

Moon was a key broker in the historic nuclear negotiations between the U.S. and North Korea. He facilitated the historic 2018 Singapore summit between Donald Trump and Kim Jong-un and joined the U.S. president in his second meeting with Kim at the Demilitarized Zone (DMZ) in 2019. Despite ideological differences with Trump — particularly regarding Trump's demands for increased cost-sharing and trade concessions — Moon affirmed the alliance as the "linchpin of peace and security". Occasional disputes did sour relations, such as the scrutiny in South Korea regarding the Japanese heritage of U.S. Ambassador to South Korea Harry B. Harris Jr. as well as Moon's comments in a 2021 interview to The New York Times that suggested that Trump "beat around the bush" and failed to fully execute denuclearization talks with North Korea, to which Trump quickly responded that Kim Jong-un had "never respected" Moon and called Moon "weak as a leader and as a negotiator".

The alliance deepened under Joe Biden, with both sides expanding into new cooperative areas such as supply chains, semiconductors and climate change. Moon pursued a "double allegiance" strategy, maintaining South Korea's defense ties with the U.S. while avoiding getting trapped in U.S. regional efforts to contain China, South Korea's largest trading partner.

==== North Korea ====
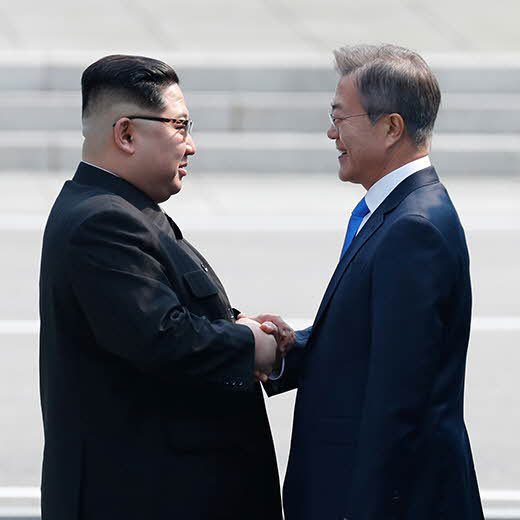
Kim and Moon shake hands in greeting at the demarcation line.

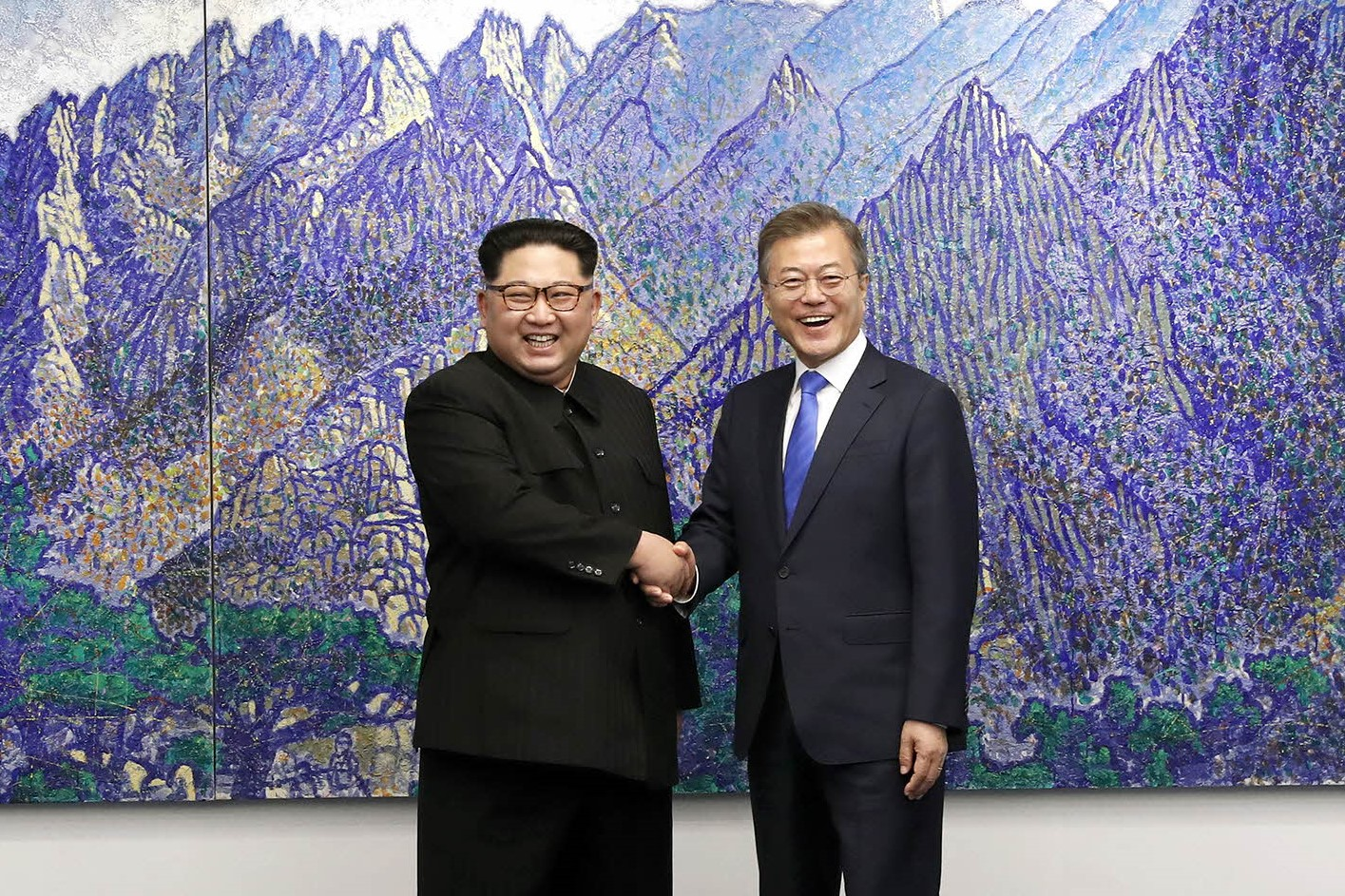
North Korean Leader Kim Jong Un and Moon shake hands inside the Peace House.

Outlining his North Korea strategy in a speech in Berlin, Germany, on 6 July 2017, Moon characterized the process leading to unification as a long-term project, rather than laying out any detailed plans for a unified Korea.

He emphasized alliance with the United States and specified the need to assure dismantlement of North Korea's nuclear weapons program. At the same time, he presented the question of unification in a regional context and signaled his hopes of working in cooperation with the international community. He supported sanctions against North Korea, while leaving open the possibility of their being rescinded, and indicated that it is crucial to establish a peace treaty with North Korea to end the Korean War officially in exchange for denuclearization.

Moon opposed the full deployment of Terminal High Altitude Area Defense (THAAD) systems during his presidential campaign and called for more peace talks engaging with North Korea.

As of late July, following North Korea's latest missile launch and increasingly aggressive actions, Moon asked the U.S. permission to build up its domestic defense systems and temporarily set up a full THAAD system.

Moon met with Kim Jong Un, Chairman of the Workers' Party of Korea, on 27 April 2018.

The inter-Korean rapprochement arouses broad enthusiasm among the South Korean population: Moon Jae-in's popularity reached 68% in April 2018.

Kim and Moon met again on 26 May. The second meeting was also at the DMZ, this time on the North Korean side of the Panmunjom village. The unannounced meeting took two hours, that was largely centered around Kim's potential first face-to-face summit with Donald Trump, which eventually took place in June 2018 in Singapore.

In September 2018, Moon Jae-in visited Pyongyang in the September 2018 inter-Korean summit. He and 150 delegates—including prominent figures in business, culture, and religion—flew to the Sunan Airport in Pyongyang and met with Kim Jong Un. The two Korean leaders announced an agreement to decrease hostilities on the DMZ, further joint-economic projects, and open North Korean weapons facilities to international experts. The leaders also gave a speech to 150,000 North Korean citizens in the Rungrado 1st of May Stadium with themes of unification, lasting peace, and friendship. Moon also climbed Mount Paektu with Kim, which had been a "long unfulfilled dream" for him. Moon was called "Kim Jong Un's Top Spokesman" by Bloomberg News. In October 2018, Moon visited Europe and lobbied for reconciliation with North Korea during the tour.

In March 2019, U.N. panel accused South Korea of violating sanctions by not notifying the Security Council about its deliveries of petroleum products for use at inter-Korean joint liaison office. Also in the Annex of the Updated Guidance on Addressing North Korea's Illicit Shipping Practices, issued from United States Department of the Treasury, a ship of South Korea was listed as that believed to have engaged in ship-to-ship transfers with North Korean tankers.

In January 2020, Moon was still serious about inter-Korean cooperation. However, on June 16, North Korea blew up an inter-Korean joint liaison office. On 23 September, as video speech at 75th Session of United Nations General Assembly, Moon mentioned about his hope that "the UN and the international community provide support so that we can advance into an era of reconciliation and prosperity through the end-of-war declaration" and "the end-of-war declaration will open the door to complete demilitarization and permanent peace regime on the Korean Peninsula."

==== China ====
Moon pursued a pragmatic "double allegiance" strategy that aimed to maintain South Korea's ironclad alliance with the U.S. while fostering closer economic and diplomatic ties with China, amid increased diplomatic friction between the United States and China, which launched a trade war against each other in 2018. Moon viewed Beijing as an essential partner for denuclearization, economic growth and regional stability. Moon also sought to defuse the severe economic retaliation by China that was caused by the U.S. THAAD anti-missile system deployment under the Park Geun-hye administration. However, public opinion in South Korea had already become increasingly critical of Beijing and Chinese President Xi Jinping never made a reciprocal state visit to South Korea during Moon's presidency.

==== Japan ====
Relations between South Korea and Japan hit their lowest point in decades under Moon due to unresolved historical disputes from Japan's colonial era. The administration often clashed with Tokyo over wartime sexual slavery ("comfort women") and forced labor compensation. In 2018, the South Korean Supreme Court rulings ordered Japanese companies to compensate Korean victims of forced labor during World War II. Japan strongly argued that all compensation issues were settled under the 1965 normalization treaty. The forced labor dispute triggered a severe trade war in 2019. Tokyo imposed export controls on critical materials needed by South Korean tech giants, and Seoul subsequently removed Japan from its "white list" of preferred trading partners. Tensions were also further exacerbated in late 2018 when Japan accused a South Korean warship of locking its targeting radar onto a Japanese patrol plane, a claim vehemently denied by Moon. Moon also canceled a planned trip to the 2020 Tokyo Olympics following a major diplomatic uproar over inappropriate and insulting comments made by a senior Japanese diplomat about Moon's efforts to improve relations.

== Post-presidency (2022–present) ==
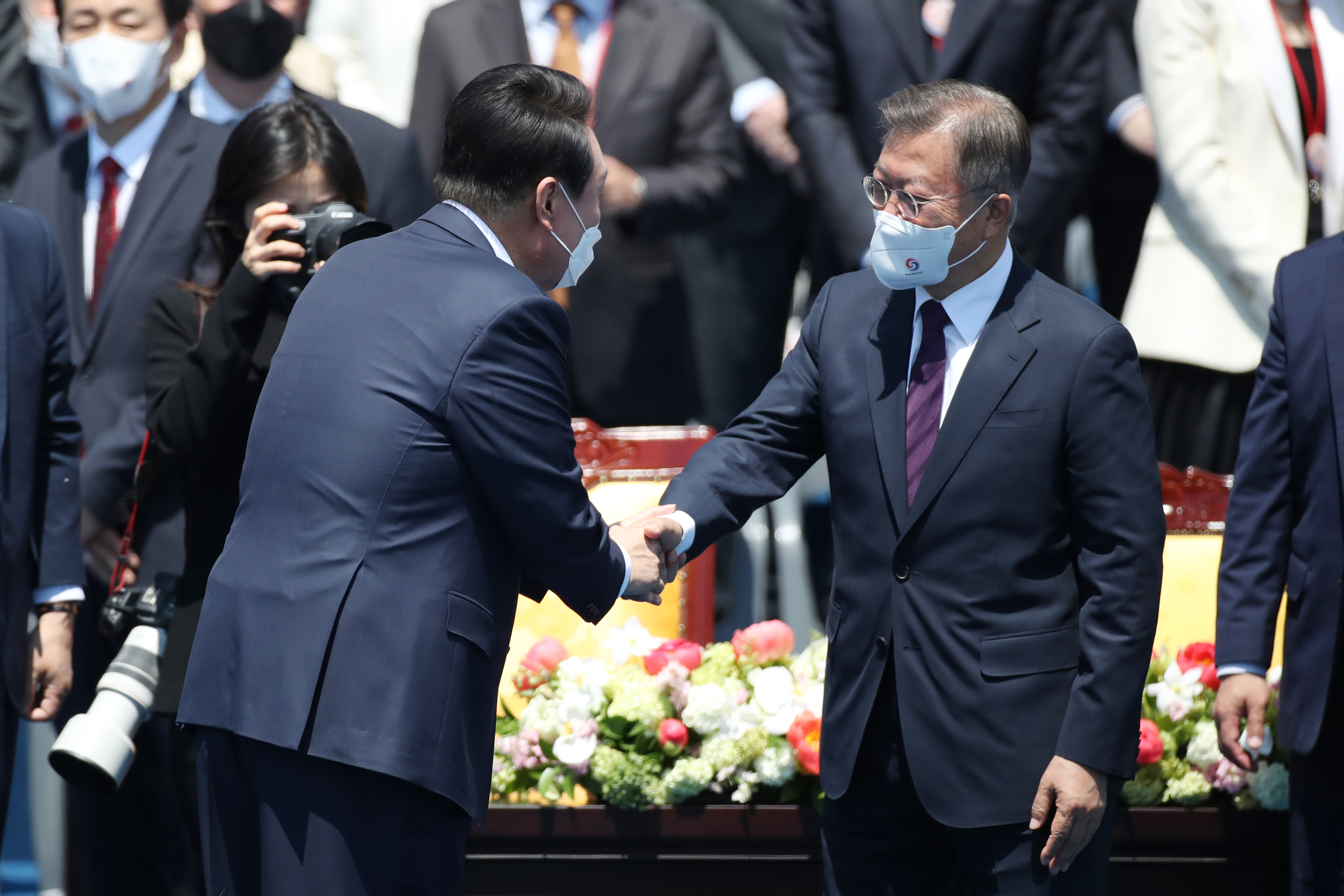
Former President Moon shakes hands with his successor Yoon Suk Yeol after Yoon's inauguration, 10 May 2022.

Moon left office on 9 May 2022, and was succeeded the next day by Yoon Suk Yeol, who previously was appointed by Moon to be Prosecutor General of South Korea. Moon now resides at Pyeongsan Village, at Yangsan, South Gyeongsang Province.

In May 2024, Moon published a memoir entitled From the Periphery to the Center (변방에서 중심으로). The book renewed discussion of several controversies related to his presidency.

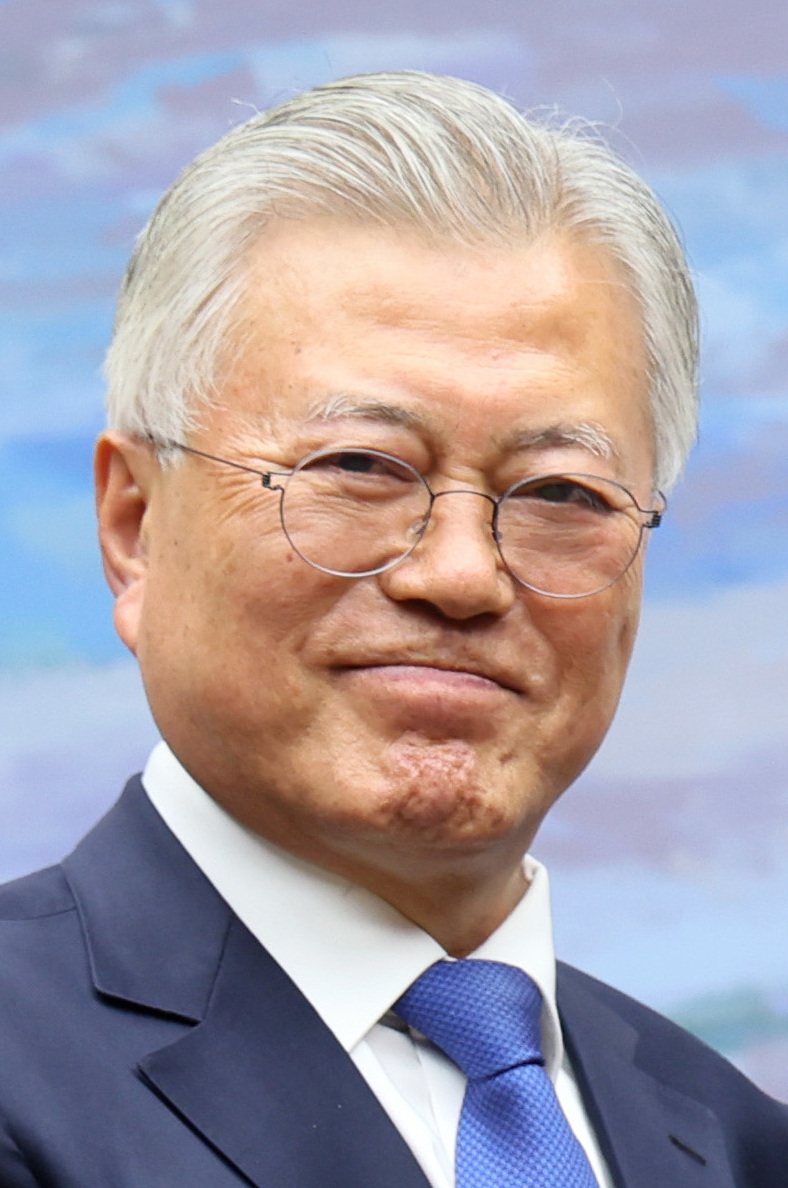
Moon in April 2025

Following the declaration of martial law by President Yoon Suk Yeol on December 3, 2024, Moon said in a post on X: "I hope that the National Assembly will act quickly to protect our democracy from crumbling." He made a further statement urging the military to not participate in a non-emergency declaration of martial law, or obstruct the National Assembly's vote on its lifting.

Pro-Yoon protester holding up a sign demanding the execution of Moon

In a February 2025 interview, Moon expressed his regret for appointing Yoon as Prosecutor General during his term, as Yoon used the conflict over prosecution reform with Moon's administration as a springboard to enter politics and win the presidency. Moon initially planned to travel to Seoul to protest the martial law, before the National Assembly overturned the martial law order. Moon called his successor "completely unfit for the presidency—he had no vision, no policy skills, and wasn't prepared". On 14 February 2025, the Hankyoreh revealed that former Defense Intelligence Command leader Roh Sang-won's personal notebook contained specific action plans to arrest Moon, as well as several other individuals such as judges and celebrities, and have them sent to a detention center.

== Legacy ==
Moon finished his term as president with the highest approval rating in the history of the 6th Republic since free and fair elections resumed in 1987. However, despite his high approval ratings, his party lost power only after five years, the first since Korea's democratization in 1987. This suggests with assertions that his high approval ratings were primarily the outcome of extensive public relations efforts to build and maintain a favorable public image, coupled with an avoidance of addressing controversial issues during his presidency.

OECD and Pew Research Center polls showed that during and after the COVID-19 pandemic, which took place during Moon's presidency, South Koreans' levels of trust in government increased, and the government oversaw a more responsive and effective disaster response to the pandemic compared to previous disasters which took place in South Korea, such as the MERS outbreak and the Sewol ferry disaster. Moon's government reduced the maximum hour work week from 68 hours to 52, which led to an increase in work-life balance, expanded childcare benefits and provision, and also health care coverage.

However, Moon's government did not act on a new anti-discrimination bill despite having a majority in the National Assembly. It also failed to effectively resolve a housing crisis in the Seoul area and its surroundings (where half of South Korea's population resides). The Seoul housing crisis was said to be enough to swing the 2022 presidential election to the opposition conservatives to succeed Moon. Critics contended that the rapid increase in the minimum wage adversely affected the South Korean economy, which has a large number of self-employed people. Moon expressed some regret for the increase's impact on the self-employed.

For foreign policy, Moon would be remembered for presiding over South Korea's increased stature and prestige in international affairs as a middle power, and pushing forward with trade negotiations with South East Asia and India under his signature New Southern Policy (NSP). NSP aimed to diversify South Korea's economic and strategic relationships due to uncertainty caused by increasing competition between its closest ally, the United States, and the largest trading partner, China. However, Moon's summits with North Korea failed to achieve any significant breakthrough in inter-Korean or US-North Korea relations, and relations between South Korea and Japan fell to further new lows.

In 2017, Moon apologized to Vietnam for war crimes committed by South Korean troops during the Vietnam War, although the issue was minimized by the Vietnamese media and South Korean media as it was not seen as an official apology.

== Electoral history ==
2012 South Korean legislative election - Sasang, Busan
Party	Candidate	Votes	%
Democratic United	Moon Jae-in	65,336	55.04
Saenuri	Son Su-jo	51,936	43.77
Korea Vision	Na Kyung-su	749	0.63
Real Democratic	Son Hyun-Kyung	668	0.56
Total votes		208,214	100.0
Democratic United gain from Saenuri			

2012 South Korean presidential election
Party	Candidate	Votes	%
Saenuri	Park Geun-hye	15,773,128	51.55
Democratic United	Moon Jae-in	14,692,632	48.02
Independent	Kang Ji-won	53,303	0.17
Independent	Kim Soon-ja	46,017	0.15
Independent	Kim So-yeon	16,687	0.05
Independent	Park Jong-sun	12,854	0.04
Total votes		30,721,459	100.0

2017 South Korean presidential election
Party	Candidate	Votes	%
Democratic	Moon Jae-in	13,423,800	41.08
Liberty Korea	Hong Joon-pyo	7,852,849	24.03
People	Ahn Cheol-soo	6,998,342	21.41
Bareun	Yoo Seong-min	2,208,771	6.76
Justice	Sim Sang-jung	2,017,458	6.17
Saenuri	Cho Won-jin	42,949	0.13
Independent	Kim Min-chan	33,990	0.10
People's United	Kim Sun-dong	27,229	0.08
Grand National	Jang Sung-min	21,709	0.07
Hongik Party	Yoon Hok-sik	18,543	0.06
Nationalist	Lee Kyung-hee	11,355	0.03
Evergreen Korea Party	Lee Jae-oh	9,140	0.03
Economic	Oh Young-guk	6,040	0.02
Total votes		32,807,908	100.0

=== Primary election ===
2012 South Korean presidential election Democratic Primary
Party	Candidate	Votes	%
Democratic United	Moon Jae-in	347,183	56.5
Democratic United	Sohn Hak-kyu	136,205	22.2
Democratic United	Kim Doo-kwan	87,842	14.3
Democratic United	Chung Sye-kyun	43,027	7.0
Total votes		614,257	100.0

2017 South Korean presidential election Democratic Primary
Party	Candidate	Votes	%
Democratic	Moon Jae-in	936,419	57.0
Democratic	Ahn Hee-jung	353,631	21.5
Democratic	Lee Jae Myung	347,647	21.2
Democratic	Choi Sung	4,943	0.3
Total votes		1,642,677	100.0

== Honours ==
=== National honours ===
- South Korea: Recipient of the Grand Order of Mugunghwa (3 May 2022)

=== Foreign distinctions ===
- Austria: Grand Star of the Decoration of Honour for Services to the Republic of Austria (14 June 2021)
- Colombia: Grand Collar of the Order of Boyaca (25 August 2021)
- Norway: Grand Cross of the Order of Saint Olav (12 June 2019)
- Slovenia: Member of the Order for Exceptional Merits (21 September 2021)
- Spain: Knight of the Collar of the Order of Civil Merit (8 June 2021)
- Sweden: Knight of the Royal Order of the Seraphim (14 June 2019)

=== Other awards ===
- Atlantic Council: Global Citizen Awards (19 September 2017)
- IOC: Gold Olympic Order (30 August 2018)
- Time: One of the 100 Most Influential People of 2018

== Legal proceedings ==
=== Libel case ===
In September 2015, Moon sued former prosecutor Go Yeong-ju for libel in response to a statement he had made during Moon's campaign in 2013. Go had been quoted as calling Moon a "communist." As a public figure, Go had been noted for his investigation into the Burim incident, where he investigated five alleged communists who were later convicted of violating the anti-Communist National Security Law. On August 23, 2018, Seoul Central District Court Judge Kim Gyeong-jin. Go lauded the ruling as a victory for freedom of speech in South Korea. However, on 2 June 2020, the case was appealed. The prosecutor representing Moon is seeking one and a half years of jail time for Go. In February 2022, Go Yeong-ju's defamation trial against Moon Jae-in was ultimately concluded to be not guilty. And in the civil trial for damages, the court also ruled that Go was not liable.

=== 2018 opinion rigging scandal in South Korea ===
In April 2018, a group of supporters of the South Korean President Moon Jae-in were charged with online opinion rigging. The accused suspects were the members of the ruling Democratic Party (DPK). The main perpetrator, as well as the leader of the pro-Moon group, was a well-known power-blogger called "Druking".

In 2018, the special prosecutor indicted South Gyeongsang Province Governor Kim Kyung-soo in relation to this case. In 2019, he was jailed for two years on charges of online-rigging operations in both the first and second instance. On 21 July 2021, he was sentenced to two years by the Supreme Court for online-rigging operations (crime on 'Interference with Business' by damaging or destroying any data processor, 컴퓨터등장애업무방해죄) and eventually lost his position as governor.

=== Alleged harassment of human rights groups ===
On 13 July 2020, Park Sang-hak, a citizen of South Korea and North Korean defector, wrote an op-ed in The Washington Post. He contended that the Moon administration was working to silence human rights activists in an effort to placate North Korea. Park wrote, "Ten days ago, a TV station revealed my home address to the world, exposing me to other North Korean assassins and their supporters in the South. My personal bank accounts are under investigation, and the government has forbidden me from leaving the country. On 30 June, the government moved to pull the civic licenses of our nongovernmental organization, preventing us from holding charity fundraisers." Park cited other examples of the Moon administration's interference with human rights activists, including a 2018 effort by NIS agents under the Moon administration to block journalists from accessing a speech by Thae Yong-ho, the highest-ranking official known to have defected from North Korea.

In response to the Moon administration's treatment of Park Sang-hak, the North Korea Freedom Coalition issued a letter to President Moon. It alleged that human rights activists had been "harassed" and urged the Moon administration to "cease these actions of intimidation which seek to silence their freedom of expression." The letter noted that the South Korean government's actions appeared to conflict with the International Covenant on Civil and Political Rights treaty, which was signed by South Korea in 1990. Signatories included Suzanne Scholte.

=== Bribery charges ===
On 24 April 2025, Moon was indicted for bribery on suspicion that he had facilitated the employment of his former son-in-law at Eastar Jet, in exchange for the airline's founder, Lee Sang-jik, being appointed as head of the Korea SMEs and Startups Agency.

== Personal life ==
=== Family ===
In 1981, Moon married Kim Jung-sook, a vocalist at Kyung Hee University where he was also a student. He and Kim both individually revealed in separate Korean talk shows that they met each other when Moon was a student activist protesting the Yushin Constitution. They have two children: a daughter Moon Da-hye and a son, Moon Joon Yong who is active as a media artist.

=== Pets ===
Before his election as the president in 2017, Moon and his family lived with several dogs and cats who were all once abandoned by their previous guardians. Among those, a Pungsan dog Maru (마루) and a cat Jjingjjing (찡찡; also called Jjingjjingi; 찡찡이) have been confirmed to live with them at the Blue House either by the media or its official social media posts. Jjingjjing is the country's first-ever "First Cat."

After settling in at the official presidential residence at the Blue House, a dog Tori (토리; a mixed-breed) was adopted from an animal shelter in contrast with other "First Dogs" who have traditionally been purebred Jindo dogs. In regards to Tory's adoption, Moon stated that "we need to pay more attention to abandoned animals and care for them as a society" and that he wanted to remove the stigma against Tory's dark coat, which contributed to him being virtually un-adoptable for two years after he was rescued in 2015. He also received a pair of Pungsan dogs, male Songgang (송강) and female Gomi (곰이) from North Korean counterpart Kim Jong Un as a gift shortly after meeting in September 2018. Gomi later gave birth to six puppies, Sani (산이), Deuri (들이), Gangi (강이), Byeori (별이), Dari (달이), and Haennim (햇님) named after Korean words for parts of nature - a mountain, grass field, a river, a star, the Moon and the Sun. On 30 August 2019, the six puppies were sent to Seoul, Incheon, Daejeon and Gwangju, leaving their parents at Cheong Wa Dae.

=== Religion ===
Moon is the third Korean president who is a Catholic, after Kim Dae-jung and Roh Moo-hyun (a lapsed Catholic). Moon's wife, First Lady Kim Jung-sook, is also Catholic. He is the second leader who remains a practicing Catholic while in office; his baptismal (or Christian) name is Timothy.

=== Nickname ===
His nickname is "Dark King" (명왕; 冥王; Myeongwang), after the character Silvers Rayleigh from the Japanese manga series One Piece.

== Authored books ==
- Moon Jae-in (15 June 2011). 문재인의 운명 [Fate of Moon Jae-in] (in Korean) (1st ed.). Seoul: Gagyo. ISBN 978-89-7777-188-8.
- ———————; Kim In-hoe (23 November 2011). 검찰을 생각한다 [Think of the prosecution] (in Korean). Paju: May Books. ISBN 978-89-966875-2-8.
- ——————— (6 August 2012). 사람이 먼저다 [Person comes first] (in Korean). Seoul: Purple Cow. ISBN 978-89-97838-02-8.
- ——————— (8 August 2012). 문재인이 드립니다 [Moon Jae-in gives it] (in Korean). Paju: Leaders Book. ISBN 978-89-01-14936-3.
- ——————— (10 December 2013). 1219 끝이 시작이다 [1219 The end is beginning] (in Korean). Seoul: Bada Books. ISBN 978-89-5561-690-3.
- ——————— (20 January 2017). 대한민국이 묻는다 [Korea Asks You] (in Korean). Paju: Book 21. ISBN 978-89-509-6884-7.
- ———————; Lee Na-mi (23 March 2017). 운명에서 희망으로 [From Fate To Hope] (in Korean). Paju: Dasan Books. ISBN 979-11-306-1171-6.
- ——————— (16 April 2024). 문재인의 독서노트 [Moon Jae-in's Reading Notes] (in Korean). Yangsan: Pyeongsan Bookstore. ISBN 979-11-983086-1-0.
- ——————— (18 May 2024). 변방에서 중심으로 [From the Periphery to the Center] (in Korean). Paju: Gimm-young Publishers. ISBN 978-89-349-3575-9.

== See also ==
- Outline of South Korea

== Notes ==
National Assembly of the Republic of Korea
Preceded by Chang Je-won	Member of the National Assembly from Sasang District (Busan); 30 May 2012–29 May 2016	Succeeded by Chang Je-won
Party political offices
Preceded by Chung Dong-young (Grand Unified Democratic New Party nominee for President of South Korea); Lee In-je (Democratic Party nominee for President of South Korea)	Democratic United Party, Democratic Party nominee for President of South Korea; 2012, 2017	Succeeded by Lee Jae Myung
Preceded by Lee Hae-chan	Acting Chairman of the Democratic United Party; 18 November 2012–28 December 2012	Succeeded by Park Ki-choon (Interim)
Preceded by Kim Han-gil, Ahn Cheol-soo (Co-Leader); Park Young-sun (ERC); Moon Hee-sang (Interim)	Leader of the New Politics Alliance for Democracy, Democratic Party; 9 February 2015–27 January 2016	Succeeded by Kim Chong-in (Interim); Choo Mi-ae
Political offices
Preceded by Lee Jae-shin	Senior Secretary to the President for Civil Affairs; 25 February 2003–13 February 2004	Succeeded by Park Jung-gyu
New office	Senior Secretary to the President for Civil Society; 16 May 2004–20 January 2005	Succeeded by Lee Kang-chul
Preceded by Park Jung-gyu	Senior Secretary to the President for Civil Affairs; 20 January 2005–2 May 2006	Succeeded by Jeon Hae-cheol
Preceded by Lee Byung-wan	Chief of Staff to the President; 12 March 2007–24 February 2008	Succeeded by Yu Woo-ik
Preceded by Park Geun-hye; Hwang Kyo-ahn (Acting)	President of South Korea; 10 May 2017–9 May 2022	Succeeded by Yoon Suk Yeol
