= Dongseo University =

Private university in Busan, South Korea

Coordinates: 35°10′46″N 129°04′32″E

- 동서대학교
- Motto: Truth, Creativity, Service (진리 - 창조 - 봉사)
- Type: Private
- Established: 1992
- President: Chang, Jekuk
- Faculty: Full-time 350
- Students: 12,000
- Location: Busan, South Korea
- Campus: Urban
- Mascot: Bald eagle (독수리)
- Website: www.dongseo.ac.kr/eng/

- Dongseo University
- Hangul: 동서대학교
- Hanja: 東西大學校
- RR: Dongseo daehakgyo
- MR: Tongsŏ taehakkyo

Main campus in Sasang District, Busan.

Dongseo University (DSU; Korean: 동서대학교) is a private university in Busan, South Korea. In 2013, DSU was ranked by Quacquarelli Symonds with The Chosun Ilbo among the Top 50 Asian universities for internationalization.

== History ==
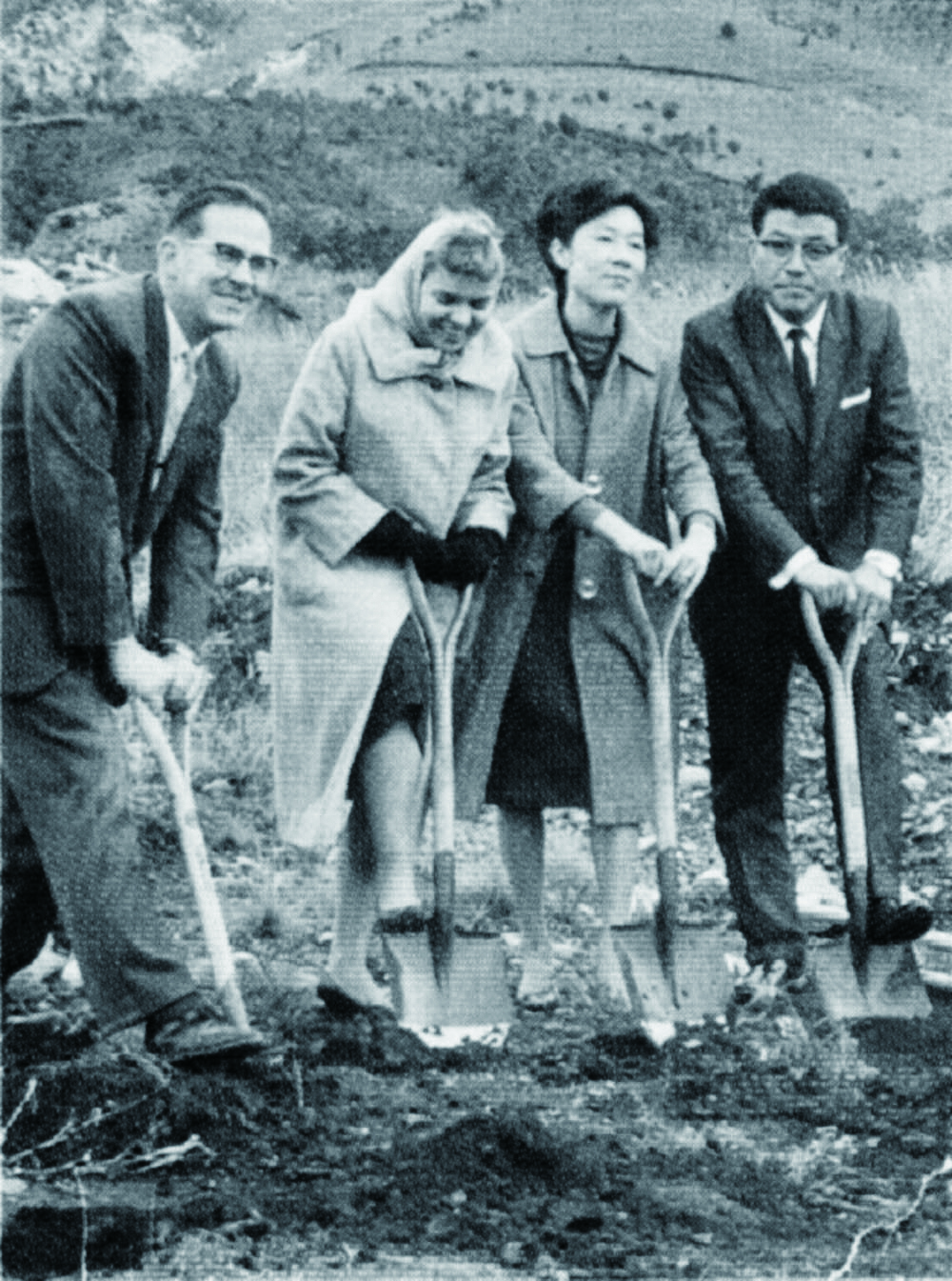
Dongseo Educational Foundation Groundbreaking

The Dongseo Educational Foundation was established by Dr. Chang Sŏng-man (Korean: 장성만; Hanja: 張聖萬) with the aim of spreading higher education in South Korea based on the spirit of Christianity. In 1965, the foundation opened Kyungnam College of Information and Technology. This was followed by Dongseo University in 1992 and Busan Digital University in 2002. Collectively, the three educational institutions have roughly 23,000 students and employ over 1,000 professors and staff. Dr. Dong Soon Park (Korean: 박동순; Hanja: 朴東順) is the current chancellor of the Dongseo Educational Foundation.

The name originally given to DSU was Dongseo College of Technology. However, one year later this was changed to Dongseo University of Technology, and in 1996 the name Dongseo University was officially adopted.

In its first year, DSU accepted 400 students in 8 departments based primarily in fields of engineering and technology. The university was founded by Dr. Sung Man Chang, who also served as university president until 1999, when he was elected as First Chairman of the Busan Christian Organization. Dongseo University is now led by Dr. Jekuk Chang (Korean: 장제국; Hanja: 張濟國).

== Academics ==
At its Busan campuses, Dongseo University offers undergraduate degrees in 57 departments and graduate degrees in 10 departments. These comprise 14 divisions along with the College of Design and the Im Kwon Taek College of Film and Media Arts.

Areas of specialization at Dongseo University include Design, Digital Contents (Game, Animation, Visual Effects), Film & Video, and Information Technology. DSU also operates the Global Studies Institute, which provides services for international students and oversees the English-based undergraduate degree programs in Business Administration, Biomedical Laboratory Science, Computer Engineering, Digital Contents, Graphic Design, International Studies, and Film & Video.

== Campuses ==
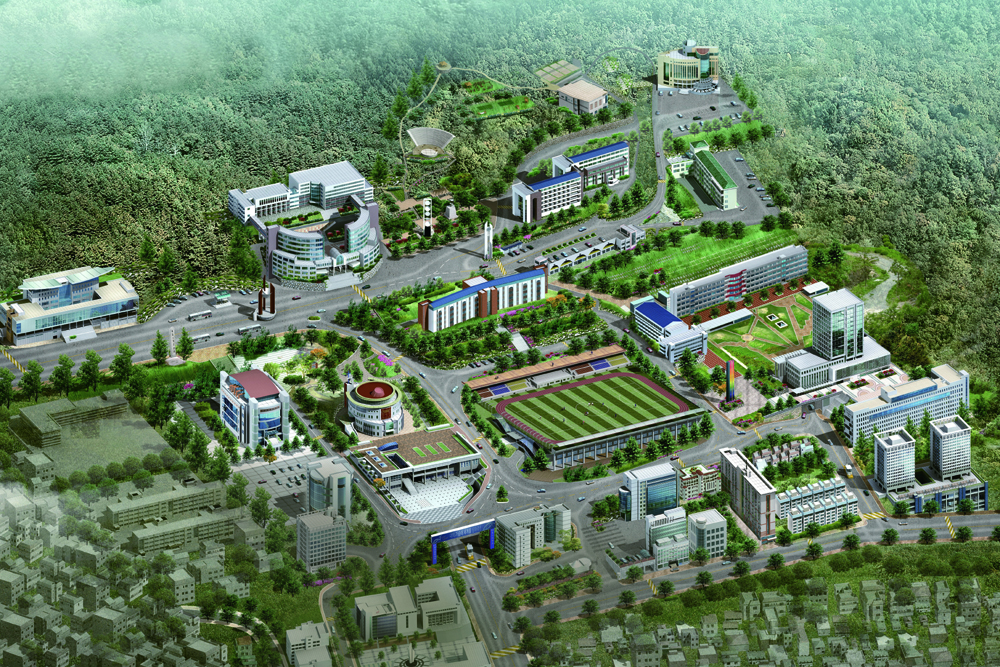
DSU Main Campus

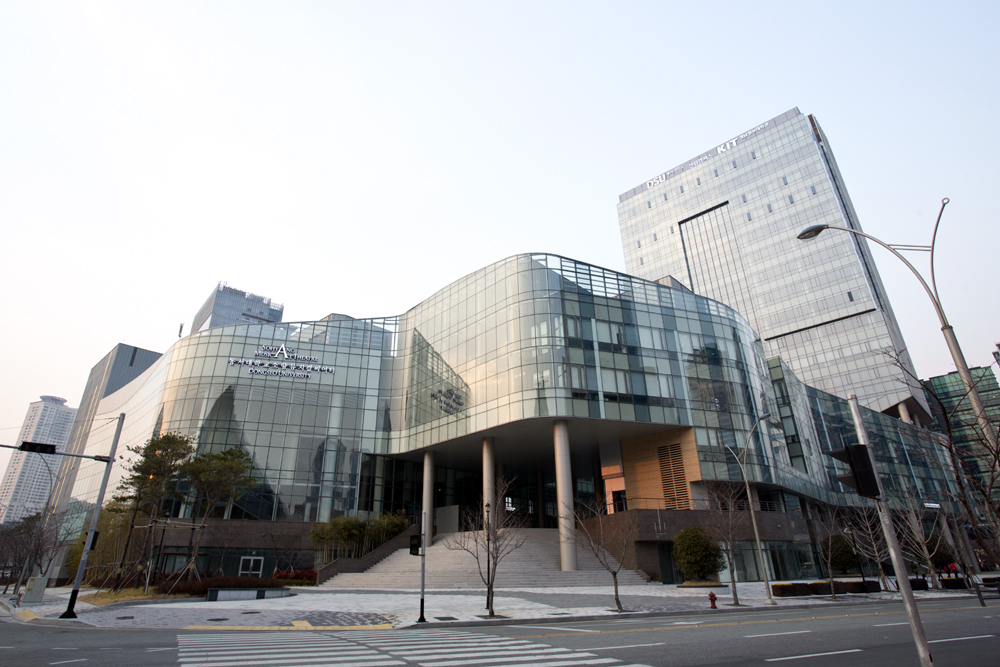
DSU Centum Campus

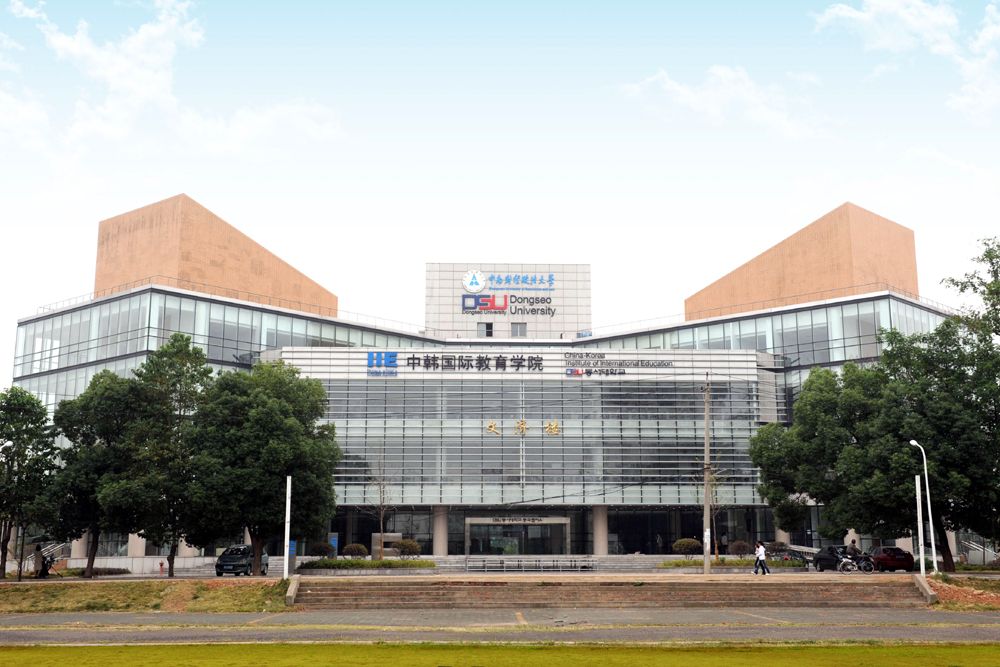
Korea-China New Media Institute

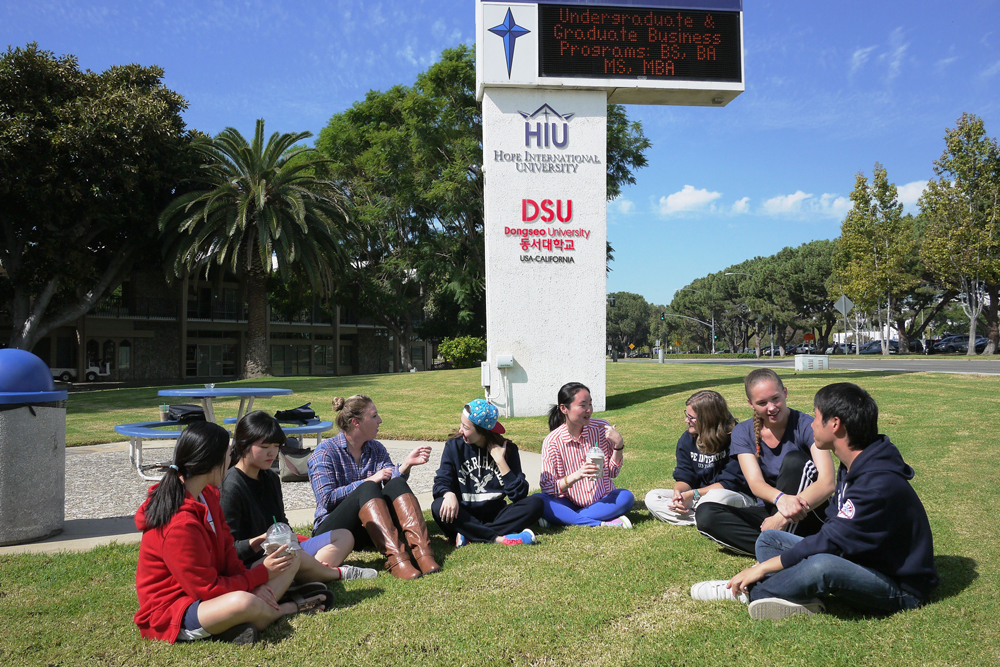
Hope International University Campus

Dongseo University has two campuses in Busan, South Korea. Its main campus is located near Jurye Station in the Sasang District of the city. This campus covers an area of 82 acres and has 31 buildings.

The second Busan campus is commonly referred to as the Centum Campus due to its location in the Centum City area of the Haeundae District. This campus opened in 2012 and is the main site of the Im Kwon Taek College of Film and Media Arts and the Division of Tourism. The campus is situated in an 18-story building with an overall area of 16,532 square meters.

Dongseo University also operates branch campuses with in the U.S. and China. Dongseo University operates a campus at Hope International University in Fullerton, California to which the university sends 100 students annually. It also operates a campus at Zhongnan University of Economics and Law in China to which the university sends 200 students annually.

== International programs ==
Active programs include Global Access Asia, an online credit-based course sharing platform; Asia Summer Program, a 3-week credit-based summer program; CAMPUS Asia, a student mobility program operated with Guangdong University of Foreign Studies in China and Ritsumeikan University in Japan; and Dongseo Asia Initiatives Program, a short-term program enabling teams of students to conduct independent research projects abroad in Asia.

== See also ==
- List of colleges and universities in South Korea
- Education in South Korea
- Sasang
