= Gamjeon station =

Station of the Busan Metro

226 감전 (사상구청·한국건강관리협회) Gamjeon (Sasang-gu Office·Korea Health Management Association)
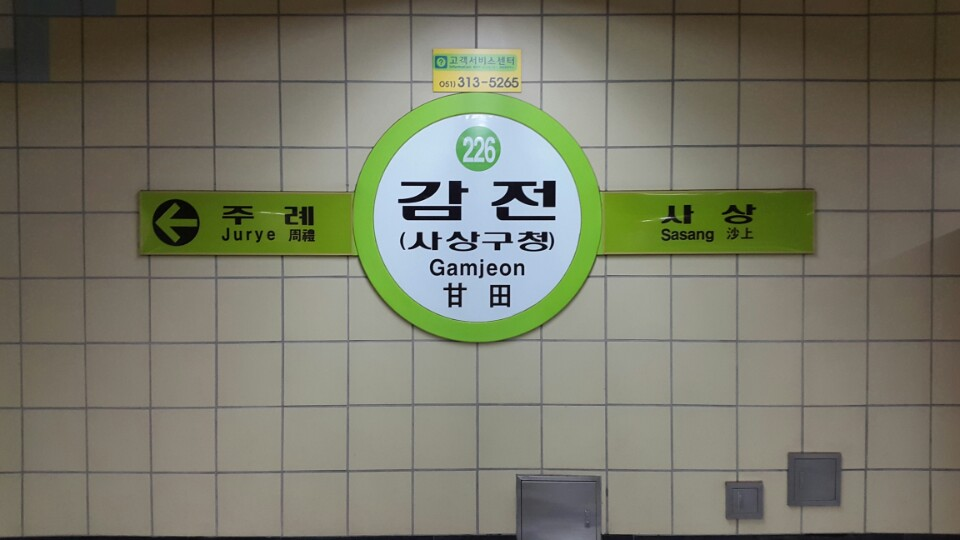

Korean name
- Hangul: 감전역
- Hanja: 甘田驛
- Revised Romanization: Gamjeon-yeok
- McCune–Reischauer: Kamchŏn-yŏk

General information
- Location: Gamjeon-dong, Sasang District, Busan; South Korea
- Coordinates: 35.1557°N 128.9909°E
- Operator: Busan Transportation Corporation
- Line: Busan Metro Line 2
- Platforms: 2
- Tracks: 2

Construction
- Structure type: Underground

Other information
- Station code: 226

History
- Opened: June 30, 1999; 27 years ago
Location

Gamjeon Station (Korean: 감전역) is a station on the Busan Metro Line 2 in Gamjeon-dong, Sasang District, Busan, South Korea.

Preceding station	Busan Metro	Following station
Jurye towards Jangsan	Line 2	Sasang towards Yangsan
