= Jurye station =

Station of the Busan Metro

225 주례 Jurye
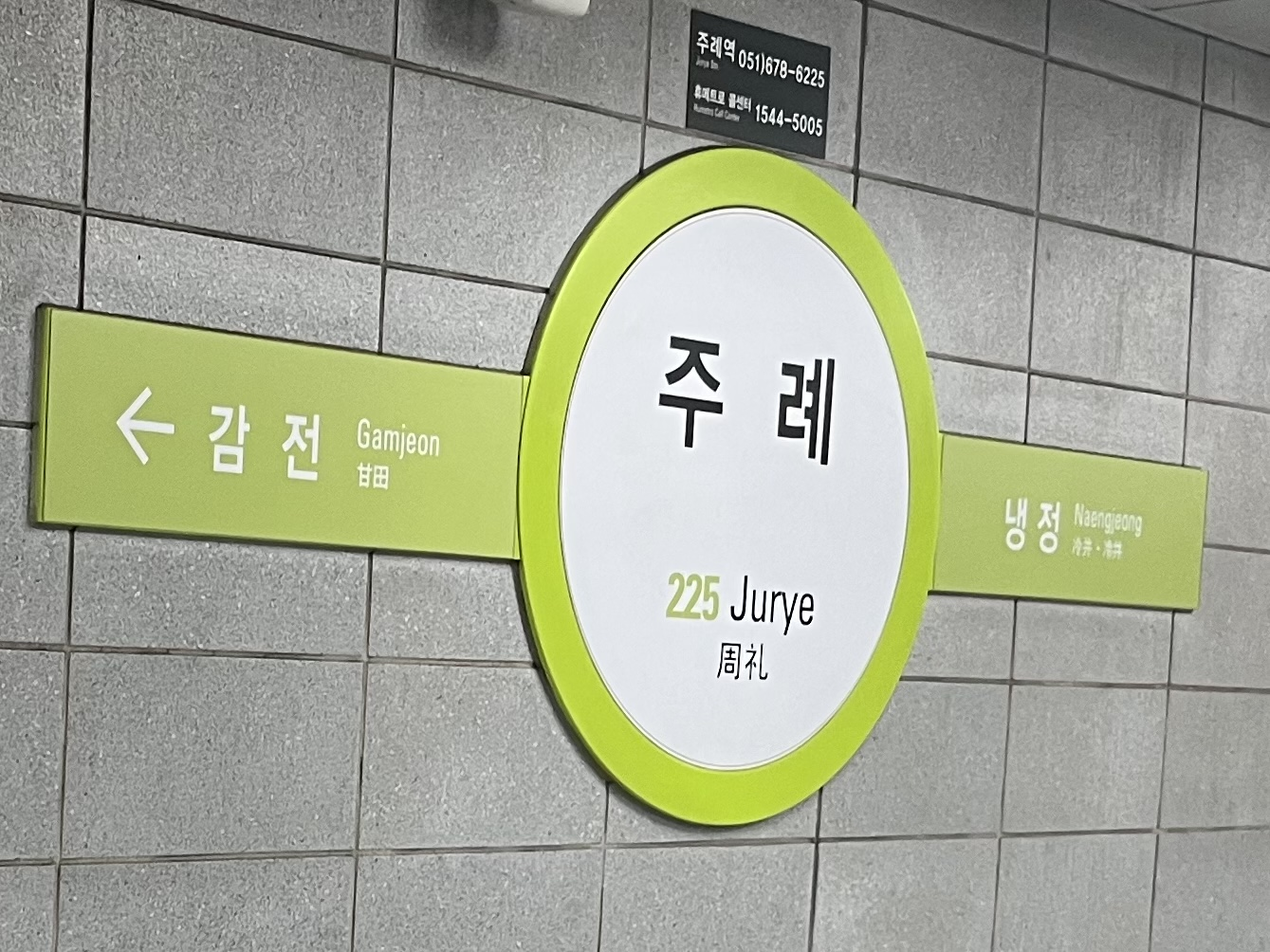

Korean name
- Hangul: 주례역
- Hanja: 周禮驛
- Revised Romanization: Jurye yeok
- McCune–Reischauer: Churye yŏk

General information
- Location: Jurye-dong, Sasang District, Busan; South Korea
- Coordinates: 35.1505°N 129.0032°E
- Operator: Busan Transportation Corporation
- Line: Busan Metro Line 2
- Platforms: 2
- Tracks: 2

Construction
- Structure type: Underground

Other information
- Station code: 225

History
- Opened: June 30, 1999; 27 years ago
Location

Jurye Station (Korean: 주례역) is a station on the Busan Metro Line 2 in Jurye-dong, Sasang District, Busan, South Korea.

Preceding station	Busan Metro	Following station
Naengjeong towards Jangsan	Line 2	Gamjeon towards Yangsan
