= Jang Seong-man =

South Korean politician (1932–2015)

- 장성만
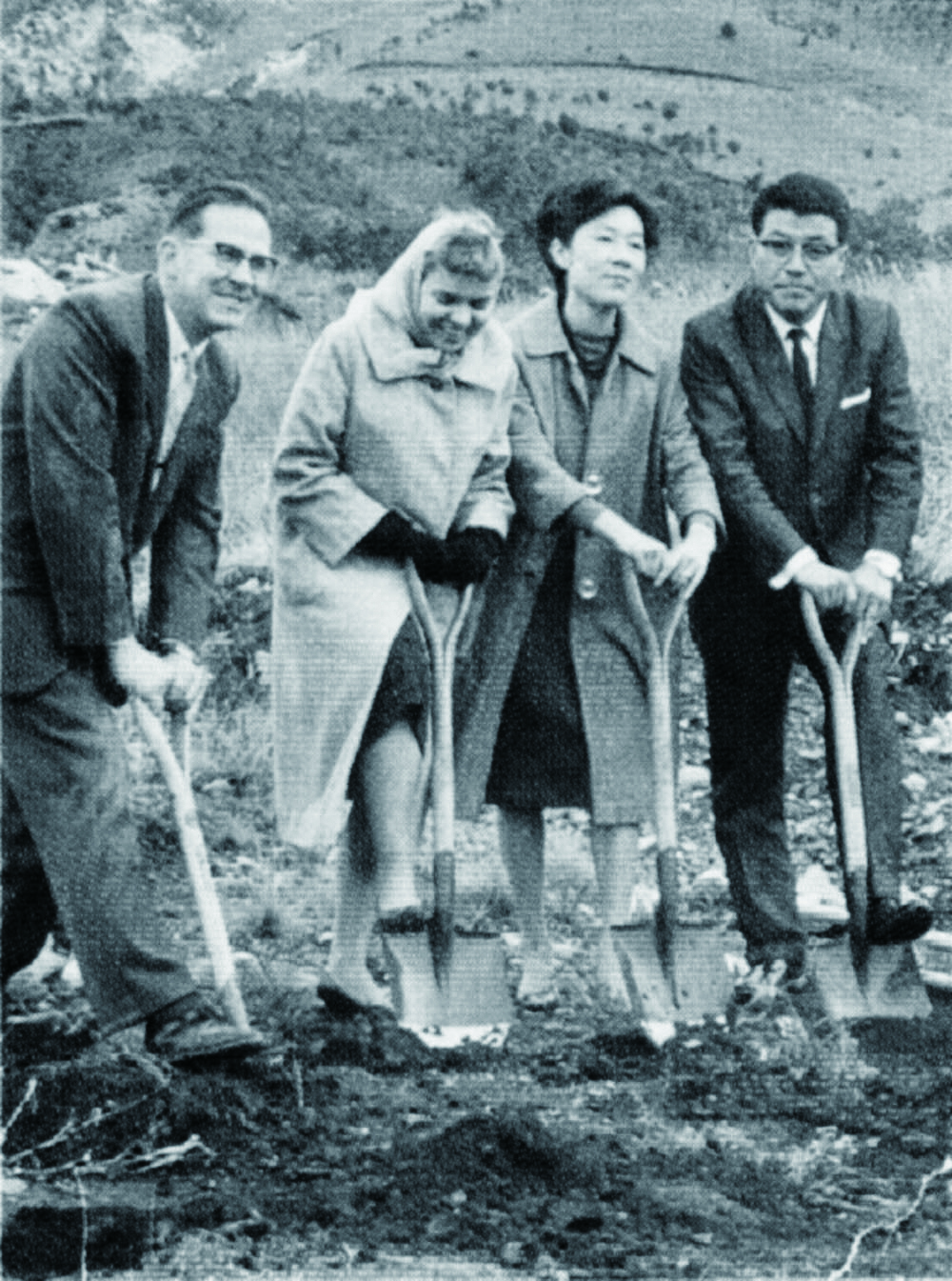
- Jang Seong-man (right-most in the picture)

President of Dongseo University
- In office 28 February 1995 – 1997
- Succeeded by: Park Dong-soon

Deputy Speaker of the National Assembly
- In office 13 May 1987 – 29 May 1988
- Preceded by: Choi Young-cheol; Cho Yeon-ha
- Succeeded by: Roh Seung-hwan; Kim Jae-kwang

Member of the National Assembly in North District
- In office 11 April 1981 – 29 May 1988
- Preceded by: Chung Hae-young (Busanjin and North)
- Succeeded by: Moon Jung-soo (1st); Shin Sang-woo (2nd)

Personal details
- Born: 2 November 1932 Busan, South Korea
- Died: 6 December 2015 (aged 83) Busan, South Korea
- Party: Democratic Justice Party (1981–1990)
- Spouse: Park Dong-soon
- Children: Chang Je-kuk; Chang Je-won; Chang Ju-young
- Relatives: Chang Yong-joon (grandson)
- Education: University of Cincinnati
- Occupation: Pastor, educator, politician

Jang Seong-man (Korean: 장성만, 2 November 1932 – 6 December 2015) was a South Korean pastor, educator, and politician. He served as a Member of the National Assembly for the North District of Busan from 1981 to 1988; he also served as the Deputy Speaker of the National Assembly from 1987 to 1988.

In addition to his career in politics, Jang established various universities such as Busan Digital University and Dongseo University; he served as the chairman of the latter from 2001 to 2008.

== Career ==
Born in Busan, Jang attended Busan Technical High School, and earned a bachelor's degree in theology from the University of Cincinnati. He served as the founding president of the Busan Christian Writers' Association in the 1950s as a Christian essayist. He then worked as a pastor, after which he started working in the education sector. In 1965, he established the very first vocational college in South Korea, Dongseo Christian Vocational School, which is now officially known as Kyungnam College of Information & Technology.

In January of 1981, Jang started his political career as a founding member of the Democratic Justice Party (DJP), which was the predecessor of the Liberty Korea Party (LKP). He was elected unopposed to the National Assembly as a representative of the North District of Busan in the 1981 election. He was then re-elected in the 1985 election. In 1987, he was elected as the sole Deputy Speaker of the National Assembly after the United Democratic Party (UDP) decided to not put its candidate due to internal conflict. Jang lost his National Assembly seat to Moon Jung-soo in 1988. He also lost while running as an independent candidate in the 1992 election.

After leaving politics, Jang established Dongseo University in 1991 and served as its chairman until 2008. In 2001, he founded Dongseo Cyber University.

== Death ==
Jang died on 6 December 2015 at the age of 83 due to a chronic disease.

Jang's widow, Park Dong-soon (born 1939), is the current chairwoman of Dongseo University. He also left three children, including Jang Je-kuk (born 1964), the current president of the university; Jang Je-won (born 1967), a Member of the National Assembly (2008–2012, 2016–present); and Jang Ju-young.

== Controversies ==
On 8 March 1988, Jang faced protests from opposition MPs after he and the DJP rushed a revised electoral law through without any agreements. It was reported that Yoo Soo-ho, the father of Yoo Seong-min, was also involved with the legislative controversy.

On 17 April 1997, Jang was arrested on corruption charges. It was alleged that he set up around 5 billion won (approximately $5 million) in a Dongseo University slush fund and misappropriated it. The embezzlement scandal led around 20 professors at the college to resign.

== Election results ==
Year	Constituency	Political party	Votes (%)	Remarks
1981	North District	DJP	Uncontested	Won
1985	North District	DJP	61,596 (30.06%)	Won
1988	North District 1st	DJP	29,960 (25.16%)	Lost
1992	North District 1st	Independent	28,517 (24.68%)	Lost
