= Real Democratic Party =

2012 political party in South Korea

Real Democratic Party 정통민주당 Jeongtong Minjudang
- Leader: Han Kwang-ok
- Founded: March 15, 2012
- Dissolved: April 12, 2012
- Split from: Democratic United Party
- Headquarters: 14-11 Daeha Building, Yeongdeungpo-gu, Seoul
- Ideology: Centrist reformism; Social conservatism
- Colours: Green

Website
- www.greenup.or.kr

The Real Democratic Party (Korean: 정통민주당, Hanja: 正統民主黨, RR: Jeongtong Minjudang) was a minor political party in South Korea. It was established on 12 March 2012 by members of the larger Democratic United Party who had failed to win nominations for candidature in the 2012 legislative elections.

== Election results ==
Election	Leader	Constituency			Party list			Seats	Position	Status
Election	Leader	Votes	%	Seats	Votes	%	Seats	Seats	Position	Status
2012	Han Kwang-ok	71,867	0.33	0 / 54	48,648	0.23	0 / 246	0 / 300	16th	Extra-parliamentary
