= Sasang District =

District of Busan, South Korea

Coordinates: 35°09′04″N 128°59′24″E

Sasang
- Autonomous District
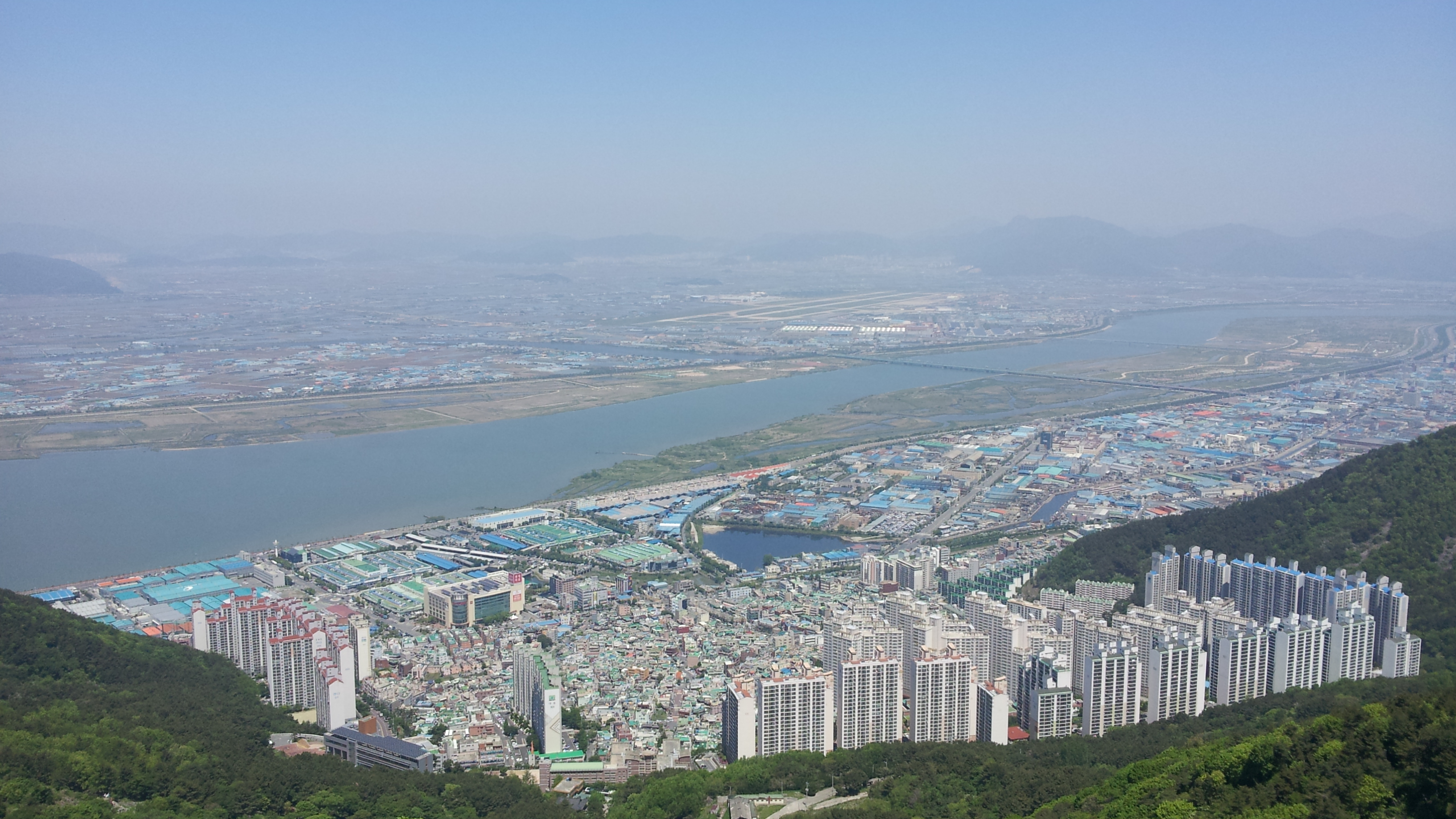

- Flag

- Country: South Korea
- Region: Yeongnam
- Provincial level: Busan
- Administrative divisions: 14 administrative dong

Government
  - Mayor: Seo Tae-kyeong (서태경)

Area
  - Total: 36.1 km^{2} (13.9 sq mi)

Population (2024)
  - Total: 199,406
  - Density: 5,520/km^{2} (14,300/sq mi)
  - Dialect: Gyeongsang
- Website: Sasang District Office

Korean name
- Hangul: 사상구
- Hanja: 沙上區
- RR: Sasang-gu
- MR: Sasang-gu

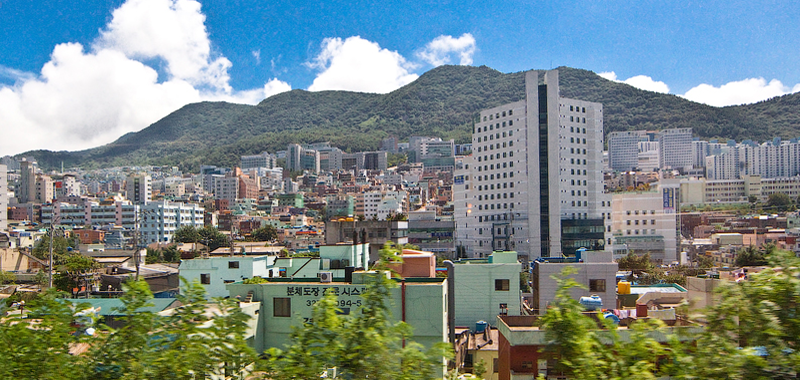
Jurye-dong

Sasang District (Korean: 사상구) is a gu in central Busan, South Korea. It has an area of 35.84 km^{2}, and a population of about 275,000. Sasang District became a gu of Busan in 1995.

== Administrative divisions ==
Administrative divisions

Sasang District is divided into 8 legal dong, which all together comprise 14 administrative dong, as follows:

- Mora-dong (3 administrative dong)
- Deokpo-dong (2 administrative dong)
- Jurye-dong (3 administrative dong)
- Samnak-dong
- Gwaebeop-dong
- Hakjang-dong
- Eomgung-dong
- Gamjeon-dong (2 administrative dong)

== Sister cities ==
- Ganjingzi, China

== See also ==
- Geography of South Korea
- Subdivisions of South Korea
