= National Route 35 (South Korea) =

Road in South Korea

National Route 35
- 국도 제35호선

Route information
- Length: 458.6 km (285.0 mi)
- Existed: 14 March 1981–present

Major junctions
- South end: Buk District, Busan
- North end: Gangneung, Gangwon Province

Location
- Country: South Korea

Highway system
- Highway systems of South Korea; Expressways; National; Local

National Route 35 is a national highway in South Korea connects Buk District to Gangneung. It established on 14 March 1981.

== History ==
- March 14, 1981: National Route 35, the Busan–Gangneung Line, was newly designated.
- April 13, 1981: A 115.4 km section between Dongjeom-ri, Jangseong-eup, Samcheok County, and Seongnae-dong, Gangneung City, which had been elevated to national highway status, was opened.
- May 8, 1981: A 166.6 km section between Wolsan-ri, Naenam-myeon, Wolseong County, and Socheon 1-ri, Beopjeon-myeon, Bonghwa County, which had been elevated to national highway status, was opened.
- May 12, 1981: A 54.932 km section between Gasan-ri, Dong-myeon, Yangsan County, and Bungye-ri, Dudong-myeon, Ulju County, which had been elevated to national highway status, was opened.
- May 30, 1981: The road district was determined as the newly established 319 km section following the amendment of the General National Highway Route Designation Decree by Presidential Decree No. 10247.
- March 11, 1989: The former road sites in the areas of Yongyeon-ri, Habuk-myeon, and Seokgye-ri and Daeseok-ri, Sangbuk-myeon, Yangsan County, were abolished.
- July 15, 1994: A 13 km section between Gwangdong-ri and Tosan-ri, Hajang-myeon, Samcheok County, and a 660 m section between Songgye-ri and Bongsan-ri, Imgye-myeon, Jeongseon County, were opened.
- January 12, 1995: A 13 km section of the Tosan–Imgye road between Tosan-ri, Hajang-myeon, Samcheok County, and Bongsan-ri, Imgye-myeon, Jeongseon County, was opened.
- July 1, 1996: The starting point was changed from Busanjin-gu, Busan Direct-controlled Municipality, to Buk-gu, Busan Metropolitan City.
- January 12, 1998: The 2 km Geumso Bridge section in Geumso-ri, Imha-myeon, Andong City, was opened and the existing section was abolished.
- June 10, 1998: The 5.21 km section of the Tongdosa–Eonyang road between Banggi-ri and Gyodong-ri, Samnam-myeon, Ulju County, was widened and opened, and the existing section was abolished.
- September 17, 1999: The 550 m section of the Ocheon 1 District hazardous-road improvement project between Gaya-ri and Ocheon-ri, Waryong-myeon, Andong City, was improved and opened, and the existing section was abolished. The 340 m Ocheon 3 District section in Ocheon-ri was also improved and opened, with the existing 350 m section abolished. The 340 m Tae 3 District section in Tae-ri was likewise improved and opened, with the existing 360 m section abolished. In addition, the 460 m Saeteo Bridge section in Dongbu-ri, Dosan-myeon, was newly constructed and opened, replacing the existing 320 m section.
- February 24, 2000: A 22.8 km section between Gyo-dae-ri, Geumho-eup, Yeongcheon City, and Sangdeok-ri, Gohyeong-myeon, was designated as an automobile-only road.
- December 18, 2000: A 9.015 km road section within the Jeongsang-dong residential development district in Andong City was opened.
- December 28, 2004: A 2.2 km section of the Geumho–Imgo and Yeongcheon–Gohyeong portions of the Yeongcheon National Highway Bypass Road, between Omi-dong and Wansan-dong, Yeongcheon City, was widened and opened.
- December 28, 2004: The entire 30.5 km section of the Yeongcheon–Bukan and Bukan–Gyeongju roads between Seokseom-ri, Geumho-eup, Yeongcheon City, and Gwangmyeong-dong, Gyeongju City, was widened and opened, and the existing 36.3 km section was abolished.
- December 29, 2004: A 9.5 km section of the Eonyang–Inbo road between Jikdong-ri, Eonyang-eup, Ulju County, and Inbo-ri, Duseo-myeon, was widened and opened, while the existing 1.36 km section between Seohari and Inbo-ri, Duseo-myeon, was abolished. An 8.12 km section of the Inbo–Dogye road between Inbo-ri, Duseo-myeon, Ulju County, and Wolsan-ri, Naenam-myeon, Gyeongju City, was also widened and opened, while a total of 3.1 km of the existing section between Jeoneup-ri, Duseo-myeon, and Bonggye-ri, Dudong-myeon, was abolished.
- December 31, 2004: A 7.8 km section of the Dogye–Gyeongju road in Naenam-myeon, Gyeongju City, between Wolsan-ri and Baedong, was temporarily opened.
- January 27, 2006: A 1.6 km section of the Dogye–Gyeongju road in Naenam-myeon, Gyeongju City, between Wolsan-ri and Nogok-ri, was temporarily opened.
- December 27, 2006: A 3.25 km section of the Dogye–Gyeongju road between Yongjang-ri and Tap-dong, Naenam-myeon, Gyeongju City, was widened and opened, completing the entire section. The existing 6.2 km section between Nogok-ri and Baedong was abolished.
- February 27, 2007: The 25.72 km section of the Gyeongju National Highway Bypass Road, between Gueo-ri, Oedong-eup, and Gwangmyeong-dong, was designated as an automobile-only road.
- October 28, 2010: A 2.2 km section of the Hyohyeon–Naenam road of the Gyeongju National Highway Bypass Road, between Gwangmyeong-dong and Hwachon-ri, Geoncheon-eup, was partially widened and opened.
- December 31, 2010: A 4.0 km section of the Susang–Sinseok road of the Andong National Highway Bypass Road, between Susang-dong and Jeongsang-dong, Andong City, was widened and opened, while the existing 6.5 km section between Jeongsang-dong and Sinseok-ri, Namseon-myeon, was abolished.
- June 27, 2011: Following the opening of the Susang–Sinseok road of the Andong National Highway Bypass Road, the existing 4.7 km section between Sinseok-ri and Hyeonnae-ri, Namseon-myeon, Andong City, was abolished.
- December 27, 2011: The 5.88 km Nogwijae Tunnel section between Sangsong-ri, Hwabuk-myeon, Yeongcheon City, and Sachon-ri, Hyeonseo-myeon, Cheongsong County, was opened, and the existing 7.1 km section was abolished.
- December 30, 2011: A 1.22 km section of the Beopjeon–Socheon road in Eoji-ri, Beopjeon-myeon, Bonghwa County, was widened and opened, and the existing section was abolished.
- April 30, 2012: A 1.45 km section of the Andong–Giran road between Icheon-ri, Namseon-myeon, Andong City, and Imha-myeon was partially opened.
- February 6, 2014: Following the opening of the Andong–Giran road, the existing 200 m section was abolished.
- March 25, 2014: A 5.454 km section of the Andong–Giran road between Sindeok-ri and Odae-ri, Imha-myeon, Andong City, was partially opened.
- October 29, 2014: A 3.35 km section of the Andong–Giran road in Sindeok-ri, Imha-myeon, Andong City, was widened and opened, while the existing 6.9 km section between Icheon-ri, Namseon-myeon, and Odae-ri, Imha-myeon, was abolished. A new 3.39 km Dosan bypass road section in Onhye-ri, Dosan-myeon, was also opened.
- September 21, 2015: Due to the construction of the Bohyeonsan Dam, a 5.86 km section between Hoenggye-ri and Hasong-ri, Hwabuk-myeon, Yeongcheon City, was relocated, while the existing 5.55 km section was abolished because it was submerged.
- December 22, 2016: An 11.3 km section of the Wangsan–Seongsan road between Mokgye-ri, Wangsan-myeon, and Geumsan-ri, Seongsan-myeon, Gangneung City, was widened and opened, while the existing 5 km section between Doma-ri, Wangsan-myeon, and Gusan-ri, Seongsan-myeon, was abolished.
- January 30, 2018: A 10.02 km section of the first construction section of the Socheon–Dogye road between Hyeondong-ri and Goseon-ri, Socheon-myeon, Bonghwa County, was temporarily opened. A 10.19 km section of the second construction section between Goseon-ri, Socheon-myeon, Bonghwa County, and Jangseong-dong, Taebaek City, Gangwon Province, was opened ahead of schedule.
- March 27, 2018: Following completion of the second construction section of the Socheon–Dogye road, the existing 12.1 km section between Goseon-ri, Socheon-myeon, Bonghwa County, and Daehyeon-ri, Seokpo-myeon, was abolished.
- June 8, 2018: A 3.63 km section of the fourth construction section of the Gige–Andong road between Cheonji-ri, Giran-myeon, and Odae-ri, Imha-myeon, Andong City, was widened and opened, and the existing section was abolished.
- October 17, 2018: Following completion of the first construction section of the Socheon–Dogye road, the existing 13.2 km section between Hyeondong-ri and Goseon-ri, Socheon-myeon, Bonghwa County, was abolished.
- August 1, 2019: A 2.48 km section of the Yeongcheon–Samchang road between Seoncheon-ri and Geumho-ri, Hwanam-myeon, Yeongcheon City, was widened and opened, while the existing 2.25 km section was abolished.
- April 21, 2020: A 4.3 km section of the Yeongcheon–Samchang road between Omi-dong, Yeongcheon City, and Sinho-ri, Hwanam-myeon, was widened and opened, while the existing 905 m section between Dorim-dong and Sinho-ri was abolished.
- October 11, 2022: A new 2.2 km section between Samdong-ri, Myeongho-myeon, Bonghwa County, and Socheon-ri, Beopjeon-myeon, was opened, while the existing 2.5 km section was abolished.
- July 11, 2025: The route through the Seongsan-myeon township area was slightly changed.

== Main stopovers ==
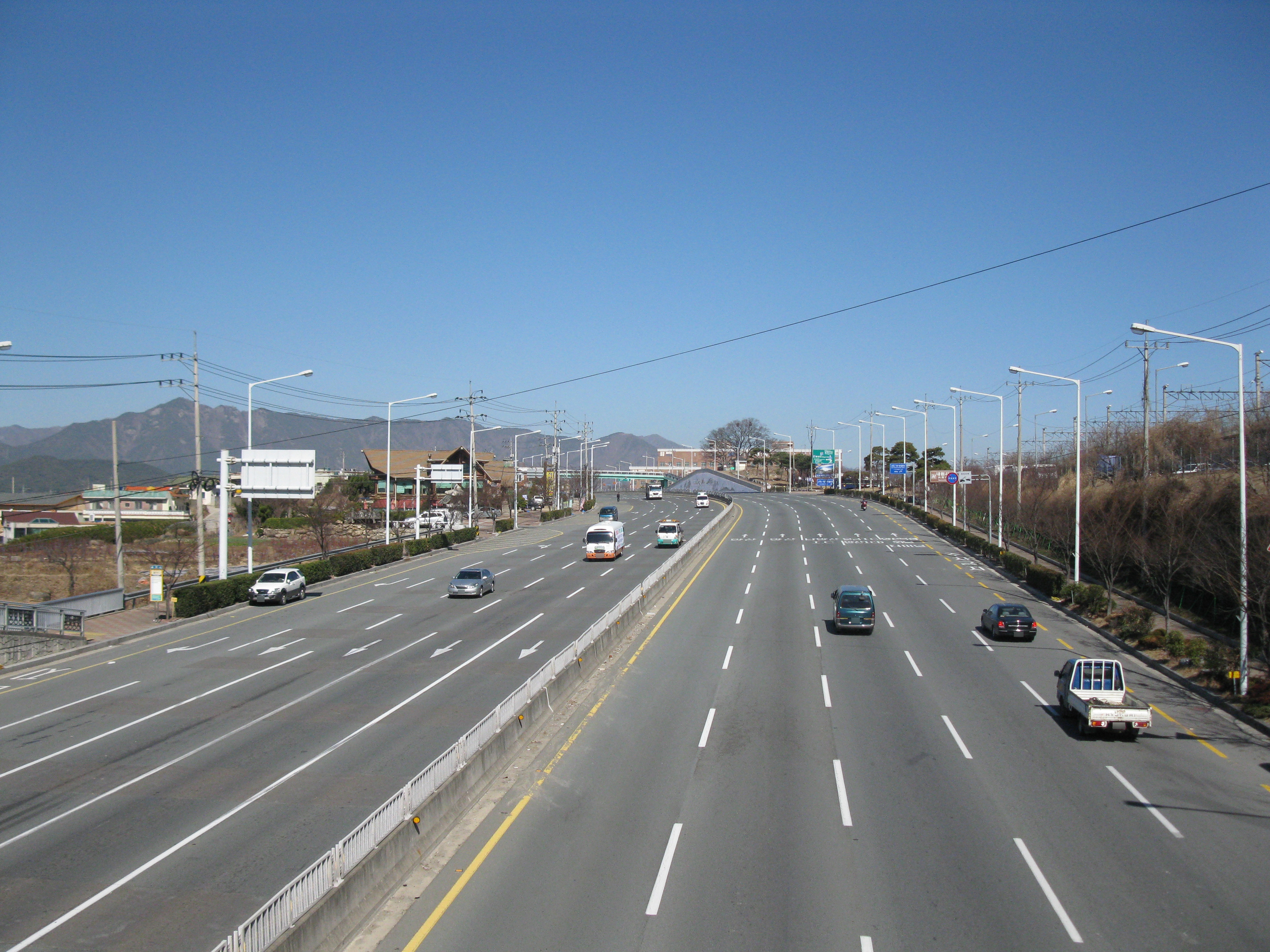
National Route 35 in Yangsan City

Busan

- Buk District

South Gyeongsang Province

- Yangsan City

Ulsan

- Ulju County

North Gyeongsang Province

- Gyeongju City - Yeongcheon City - Cheongsong County - Andong City - Bonghwa County

Gangwon Province

- Taebaek City - Samcheok City - Jeongseon County - Gangneung City

== Major intersections ==
- (■): Expressway

IS: Intersection, IC: Interchange

=== Busan ===
Name	Hangul name	Connection	Location		Note
Deokcheon IS (Deokcheon Station)	덕천 교차로 (덕천역)	National Route 14 (Nakdong-daero) (Mandeok-daero); Baegyang-daero	Busan	Buk District	Terminus
No name	(이름 없음)	Gangbyeon-daero	Busan	Buk District	
Hwamyeongdong IS (Sujeong Station)	화명동 교차로 (수정역)	Haksa-ro	Busan	Buk District	
Hwamyeong 1-dong Community Center	화명1동주민센터		Busan	Buk District	
Waseok IS (Hwamyeong Station)	와석 교차로 (화명역)	Hwamyeong-daero; Waseokjangteo-ro	Busan	Buk District	
Hwamyeong IS (Hwashin Middle School)	화명삼거리 (화신중학교)	Sanseong-ro	Busan	Buk District	
Geummyeong Middle School Geumgok High School	금명중학교 금곡고등학교		Busan	Buk District	
Yulli Station	율리역	Haksa-ro; Hyoyeol-ro	Busan	Buk District	
Human Resources Development Service of Korea Geumgok-dong Community Center Busan Public Procurement Dongwon Station	한국산업인력공단 부산지역본부 금곡동주민센터 부산지방조달청 동원역		Busan	Buk District	
Geumgok IS	금곡삼거리	Hyoyeol-ro	Busan	Buk District	
Geumgok Station IS (Geumgok Station)	금곡역삼거리 (금곡역)	Hyoyeol-ro	Busan	Buk District	Continuation into South Gyeongsang Province

=== South Gyeongsang Province ===
Name	Hangul name	Connection	Location		Note
Hopo IS (Hopo Station)	호포삼거리 (호포역)	Hopo-ro	Yangsan City	Dong-myeon	Busan - Yangsan border
Hopo Viaduct	호포고가교	Hwangsan-ro	Yangsan City	Dong-myeon	
Gasanma-eul	가산마을	Gasan 1-gil	Yangsan City	Dong-myeon	
Dongsan Elementary School	동산초등학교		Yangsan City	Dong-myeon	
Geumsan IS	금산 교차로	Geumo 1-gil	Yangsan City	Dong-myeon	
Seoksan IS (Seoksan Underpass)	석산 교차로 (석산지하차도)	Geumo-ro; Seoksan 3-gil Seoksan 6-gil	Yangsan City	Dong-myeon	
South Yangsan IC	남양산 나들목	Jungang Branch Expressway	Yangsan City	Dong-myeon	
Gyeseok IS	계석 교차로	Gyeseok-ro; Namyangsan-gil	Yangsan City	Dong-myeon	
Seoksan Bridge			Yangsan City	Dong-myeon	
Seoksan Bridge			Yangsan City	Jungang-dong	
7beon IS	7번 교차로	Noposasong-ro; Cheongun-ro	Yangsan City	Jungang-dong	
8beon IS (Nambu Underpass)	8번 교차로 (남부지하차도)		Yangsan City	Jungang-dong	
9beon IS	9번 교차로	Nambu-ro; Seoildong-ro	Yangsan City	Jungang-dong	
10beon IS	10번 교차로	Jungbu-ro	Yangsan City	Jungang-dong	
11beon IS (Yangju Underpass)	11번 교차로 (양주지하차도)	Prefectural Route 1022; Prefectural Route 1077 (Samil-ro)	Yangsan City	Jungang-dong	
Yangsan Stadium	양산종합운동장		Yangsan City	Jungang-dong	
12beon IS	12번 교차로	Gangbyeon-ro; Junganguhoe-ro	Yangsan City	Jungang-dong	
Singi Bridge	신기교 남단	Prefectural Route 60 (Myeonggok-ro)	Yangsan City	Jungang-dong	
Singi Bridge			Yangsan City	Jungang-dong	
Singi Bridge			Yangsan City	Samseong-dong	
13beon IS	13번 교차로	Prefectural Route 60 (Gongdan-ro)	Yangsan City	Samseong-dong	
14beon IS	14번 교차로	Bukjeong-ro	Yangsan City	Samseong-dong	
15beon IS	15번 교차로	Sanmakgongdan-ro	Yangsan City	Samseong-dong	
Yangsan IC	양산 나들목	Gyeongbu Expressway	Yangsan City	Sangbuk-myeon	
Hyochungma-eul Entrance IS	효충마을입구삼거리	Prefectural Route 1077 (Eogok Tunnel-ro)	Yangsan City	Sangbuk-myeon	
Soto Elementary School Entrance	소토초등교입구	Wagok 4-gil	Yangsan City	Sangbuk-myeon	
KISWIRE Ltd	고려제강앞	Sangbukjungang-ro	Yangsan City	Sangbuk-myeon	
Gamgyeolma-eul Entrance (Yangsan Customs)	감결마을입구 (양산세관)	Gamgyeol-gil	Yangsan City	Sangbuk-myeon	
Gongam IS	공암삼거리	Gongam-gil	Yangsan City	Sangbuk-myeon	
Moraebul	(모래불)	Prefectural Route 1028 (Sangbukjungang-ro); Gusoseok-gil; Moraebul-gil	Yangsan City	Sangbuk-myeon	Prefectural Route 1028 overlap
Banhoe IS	반회사거리	Banhoeseo 3-gil Soseok Bridge	Yangsan City	Sangbuk-myeon	Prefectural Route 1028 overlap
Sanggye Bridge Entrance	상계교입구사거리	Prefectural Route 1028 (Suseo-ro)	Yangsan City	Sangbuk-myeon	Prefectural Route 1028 overlap
Yongjusa Entrance	용주사입구		Yangsan City	Sangbuk-myeon	
Sinjeonma-eul Entrance	신전마을입구	Sinjeon-gil	Yangsan City	Habuk-myeon	
Naewonsa Entrance	내원사입구	Yongyeon-ro	Yangsan City	Habuk-myeon	
Samgamma-eul Entrance	삼감마을입구	Samgam-gil	Yangsan City	Habuk-myeon	
Naewonsa Entrance IS	내원사입구삼거리	Prefectural Route 1028 (Yongyeon-ro)	Yangsan City	Habuk-myeon	
Nokdongma-eul Entrance	녹동마을입구	Baengnok-ro	Yangsan City	Habuk-myeon	
Samsu IS	삼수삼거리	Jinmok-ro	Yangsan City	Habuk-myeon	
Jinmokma-eul Entrance	진목마을입구	Jinmok-ro	Yangsan City	Habuk-myeon	
Baekhaksaedongne IS	백록새동네 교차로		Yangsan City	Habuk-myeon	
Cemetery IS	공원묘지삼거리	Samdeok-ro	Yangsan City	Habuk-myeon	
Chosanma-eul	초산마을		Yangsan City	Habuk-myeon	
Habuk Bridge IS	하북교 교차로	Sinpyeonggangbyeon-ro	Yangsan City	Habuk-myeon	
Tongdosa IS Tongdosa IC	통도사사거리 (통도사 하이패스 나들목)	Gyeongbu Expressway; Sinpyeong-ro; Sinpyeongnambu-gil	Yangsan City	Habuk-myeon	
Tongdosa Entrance	통도사입구	Tongdosa-ro	Yangsan City	Habuk-myeon	
Tongdo Fantasia Entrance	통도환타지아입구	Wolpyeong-ro	Yangsan City	Habuk-myeon	
Hyundai Motor Factory Office	현대차출고사무소입구	Samdong-ro	Yangsan City	Habuk-myeon	Continuation into Ulsan

=== Ulsan ===
Name	Hangul name	Connection	Location		Note
Tongdosa IC (Tongdosa IS)	통도사 나들목 (통도사 교차로)	Gyeongbu Expressway	Ulsan	Ulju County	Samnam-eup
Ottogi	오뚜기식품앞	Gacheongeumsa-gil	Ulsan	Ulju County	Samnam-eup
Samsung SDI	삼성SDI 앞		Ulsan	Ulju County	Samnam-eup
Jinae IS	지내삼거리	Gangdang-ro	Ulsan	Ulju County	Samnam-eup
Gacheon IS	가천삼거리	Gangdang-ro	Ulsan	Ulju County	Samnam-eup
Eonyang Maintenance Kumkang Industry	언양정비앞 금강공업앞		Ulsan	Ulju County	Samnam-eup
Gongamma-eul	공암마을	Gongamgongdan 1-gil Gongam-gil	Ulsan	Ulju County	Samnam-eup
Samnam IS	삼남삼거리	Jungnam-ro	Ulsan	Ulju County	Samnam-eup
Gyodong IS	교동삼거리	Jungnam-ro	Ulsan	Ulju County	Samnam-eup
Beoljangma-eul	벌장마을	Beoljang-gil	Ulsan	Ulju County	Samnam-eup
Eonyang Megamart	메가마트 언양점 앞	Hupyeong-gil	Ulsan	Ulju County	Samnam-eup
Jakcheonjeong IS	작천정삼거리	Jakgwae-ro	Ulsan	Ulju County	Samnam-eup
Sunamma-eul	수남마을	Sunambeotkkot-gil; Hwarimjeong 1-gil	Ulsan	Ulju County	Samnam-eup
Ulsan Industrial High School	미래정보고등학교	Donghyanggyo 1-gil Donghyanggyo 2-gil	Ulsan	Ulju County	Samnam-eup
No name	(이름 없음)	Jungpyeong-ro	Ulsan	Ulju County	Samnam-eup
West Ulsan IC	서울산 나들목	Gyeongbu Expressway	Ulsan	Ulju County	Samnam-eup
Eonyang Hospital IS	언양병원 교차로		Ulsan	Ulju County	Samnam-eup
Namcheon 2 Bridge			Ulsan	Ulju County	Samnam-eup
Namcheon 2 Bridge			Ulsan	Ulju County	Eonyang-eup
Namcheon 2 Bridge IS	제2남천교 교차로	Namcheon-ro	Ulsan	Ulju County	Eonyang-eup
Eonyang Bus Terminal IS (Eonyang Intercity Bus Terminal)	언양터미널사거리 (언양시외버스터미널)	Heonnyang-gil	Ulsan	Ulju County	Eonyang-eup
Dongbu 11-gil Entrance	동부11길입구	Dongbu 11-gil	Ulsan	Ulju County	Eonyang-eup
Road construction Entrance	구도로공사입구	Eupseong-ro	Ulsan	Ulju County	Eonyang-eup
Eonyang IS	언양 교차로	National Route 24 (Ulmil-ro)	Ulsan	Ulju County	Eonyang-eup
Sinheung IS	신흥삼거리	Sinheung-gil	Ulsan	Ulju County	Eonyang-eup
Dongbakgol IS	돈박골사거리		Ulsan	Ulju County	Eonyang-eup
Godeunggol IS	고등골사거리	Gamcheon-gil; Godeunggol-gil	Ulsan	Ulju County	Eonyang-eup
Jeonggeorima-eul Entrance	정거리마을입구	Jeonggeori-gil; Jeonggeogojung-gil	Ulsan	Ulju County	Eonyang-eup
Gojungma-eul Entrance	고중마을입구		Ulsan	Ulju County	Eonyang-eup
Pyeong-ri Entrance	평리입구	Pyeongnidagae-ro	Ulsan	Ulju County	Eonyang-eup
Bangok Elementary School	반곡초등학교	Goemal-gil	Ulsan	Ulju County	Eonyang-eup
Gohama-eul Entrance	고하마을입구	Goha-gil	Ulsan	Ulju County	Eonyang-eup
Okdongma-eul Entrance	옥동마을입구	Okdong-gil	Ulsan	Ulju County	Eonyang-eup
Jinhyeonma-eul Entrance	진현마을입구	Jinhyeon-gil	Ulsan	Ulju County	Duseo-myeon
Bangudae IS	반구대삼거리	Bangudaean-gil	Ulsan	Ulju County	Dudong-myeon
Sindang IS	신당삼거리	Guryangchari-ro	Ulsan	Ulju County	Dudong-myeon
Cheonjeon IS	천전삼거리	Cheonjeondaehyeon-ro	Ulsan	Ulju County	Dudong-myeon
Gosagol Entrance	고사골입구	Guryangseosan-gil	Ulsan	Ulju County	Dudong-myeon
Bangmal Entrance	방말입구	Seohaguryang-gil	Ulsan	Ulju County	Duseo-myeon
Seoha IS	서하삼거리	Inbo-ro	Ulsan	Ulju County	Duseo-myeon
Inbo IS	인보삼거리	Inbo-ro	Ulsan	Ulju County	Duseo-myeon
Dudong IS	두동사거리	Inbogumi-ro	Ulsan	Ulju County	Duseo-myeon
Dukwang Middle School	두광중학교		Ulsan	Ulju County	Duseo-myeon
Sinjeon IS	신전삼거리	Sinjeon-gil	Ulsan	Ulju County	Duseo-myeon
Jeoneup Entrance	전읍마을	Jeoneupbogan-ro	Ulsan	Ulju County	Duseo-myeon
Yuchon Entrance	유촌마을	Yuchon-gil	Ulsan	Ulju County	Duseo-myeon
Industrial Complex Entrance IS	공단입구삼거리	Jeoneumnonggong-gil	Ulsan	Ulju County	Duseo-myeon
Miho IS	미호 교차로	Mihosangdong-gil	Ulsan	Ulju County	Duseo-myeon
Miho Overpass	미호육교		Ulsan	Ulju County	Duseo-myeon
Gajeong Entrance	가정마을	Gajeong-gil	Ulsan	Ulju County	Duseo-myeon
Hwalcheon IS	활천삼거리		Ulsan	Ulju County	Duseo-myeon
Bonggye IS	봉계 교차로	Gyemyeong-ro	Ulsan	Ulju County	Dudong-myeon; Continuation into North Gyeongsang Province

=== North Gyeongsang Province ===
Name	Hangul name	Connection	Location		Note
Nogok Bridge	노곡교		Gyeongju City	Naenam-myeon	Ulsan - North Gyeongsang border
No name	(이름 없음)	Ijojungang-gil	Gyeongju City	Naenam-myeon	
No name	(이름 없음)	Gyeongdeok-ro	Gyeongju City	Naenam-myeon	
Yongjang Bridge	용장교		Gyeongju City	Naenam-myeon	
Gyeongju IC (Najeong Bridge IS)	경주 나들목 (나정교삼거리)	Gyeongbu Expressway	Gyeongju City	Hwangnam-dong	
Geumseong IS	금성삼거리	Geumseong-ro	Gyeongju City	Hwangnam-dong	
Oreung Junction	오릉네거리	Seorabeol-daero; Poseok-ro	Gyeongju City	Hwangnam-dong	
Oreung Royal Tomb	신라오릉		Gyeongju City	Hwangnam-dong	
Hwangnam Elementary School IS	황남초교네거리	Cheomseong-ro	Gyeongju City	Hwangnam-dong	
Naenam Junction (Daereungwon Tomb Complex)	내남네거리 (경주 대릉원)	National Route 4 (Taejong-ro)	Gyeongju City	Hwangnam-dong	National Route 4 overlap
Seorabeol Junction	서라벌네거리	Geumseong-ro	Gyeongju City	Jungbu-dong	National Route 4 overlap
Terminal Junction (Gyeongju Express Terminal)	터미널네거리 (경주고속버스터미널)	Gangbyeon-ro	Gyeongju City	Jungbu-dong	National Route 4 overlap
Seocheon Bridge			Gyeongju City	Jungbu-dong	National Route 4 overlap
Seocheon Bridge			Gyeongju City	Seondo-dong	National Route 4 overlap
Seocheon Bridge IS	서천교 서단	Taejong-ro; Heungmu-ro	Gyeongju City	Seondo-dong	National Route 4 overlap
Muyeorwangneung	태종 무열왕릉		Gyeongju City	Seondo-dong	National Route 4 overlap
Hyohyeon Bridge			Gyeongju City	Seondo-dong	National Route 4 overlap
Hyohyeon Bridge			Gyeongju City	Hwangnam-dong	National Route 4 overlap
Naenam IC	내남 나들목	Prefectural Route 904 (Naeoe-ro); Taejong-ro	Gyeongju City	Hwangnam-dong	National Route 4 overlap
Moryang IS	모량 교차로	Naenamoedonggando-ro	Gyeongju City	Geoncheon-eup	National Route 4 overlap
Goran Bridge	고란교	Moryanggoran-gil	Gyeongju City	Geoncheon-eup	National Route 4 overlap
Moryang Bridge	모량교		Gyeongju City	Geoncheon-eup	National Route 4 overlap
No name	(이름 없음)	Yongmyeonggongdan-gil	Gyeongju City	Geoncheon-eup	National Route 4 overlap
Cheonpo IS	천포 교차로	Naeseo-ro	Gyeongju City	Geoncheon-eup	National Route 4 overlap
North Geoncheon IC	북건천 나들목	National Route 20 (Geonposaneop-ro)	Gyeongju City	Geoncheon-eup	National Route 4 overlap
Sara Bridge	사라교	Buunnyuljeon-gil; Saraundae-gil; Jangjagol-gil	Gyeongju City	Seo-myeon	National Route 4 overlap
Ahwa IS	아화 교차로	Prefectural Route 909 (Simgok-ro)	Gyeongju City	Seo-myeon	National Route 4 overlap
Hachu IS	하추 교차로	Hwachon-gil	Gyeongju City	Seo-myeon	National Route 4 overlap
Manbul IS	만불 교차로	Naeseo-ro	Yeongcheon City	Bugan-myeon	National Route 4 overlap
Bugan Tunnel	북안터널		Yeongcheon City	Bugan-myeon	National Route 4 overlap Approximately 936m
Banjeong IS	반정 교차로	Prefectural Route 921 (Unbuk-ro)	Yeongcheon City	Bugan-myeon	National Route 4 overlap
Bugan Industrial Complex IS	북안공단 교차로	Bugangongdan-gil	Yeongcheon City	Bugan-myeon	National Route 4 overlap
Yucheon Bridge	유천대교		Yeongcheon City	Bugan-myeon	National Route 4 overlap
Jaksan IS	작산 교차로	Hanbang-ro	Yeongcheon City	Nambu-dong	National Route 4 overlap
Bongjak IS	봉작 교차로	Yeongcheon IC-ro	Yeongcheon City	Nambu-dong	National Route 4 overlap
Dodong IS	도동 교차로	Cheonmun-ro	Yeongcheon City	Nambu-dong	National Route 4 overlap
Geumho Bridge			Yeongcheon City	Nambu-dong	National Route 4 overlap
Geumho Bridge			Yeongcheon City	Geumho-eup	National Route 4 overlap
Naengcheon IS	냉천 교차로	Geumho-ro	Yeongcheon City	Geumho-eup	National Route 4 overlap
Geumho IS	금호 교차로	National Route 4 Prefectural Route 69 (Daegyeong-ro)	Yeongcheon City	Geumho-eup	National Route 4 overlap
Wonje IS	원제 교차로	Gosugol-gil	Yeongcheon City	Geumho-eup	
Daejeon IS	대전 교차로	National Route 28	Yeongcheon City	Seobu-dong	National Route 28 overlap
Nokjeon Bridge			Yeongcheon City	Seobu-dong	National Route 28 overlap
Nokjeon Bridge			Yeongcheon City	Jungang-dong	National Route 28 overlap
Omi IS	오미 교차로	National Route 28 (Yeongcheon Detour road)	Yeongcheon City	Jungang-dong	National Route 28 overlap
North Yeongcheon IC	북영천 나들목	Iksan–Pohang Expressway	Yeongcheon City	Jungang-dong	
Yeongcheon Joongang Elementary School Hwanam Branch School	영천중앙초등학교 화남분교		Yeongcheon City	Hwanam-myeon	
Jigok Elementary School Yeongcheon Electronics High School	지곡초등학교 영천전자고등학교		Yeongcheon City	Hwanam-myeon	
Jacheon Middle School	자천중학교		Yeongcheon City	Hwabuk-myeon	
Sangsong IS	상송 교차로	Prefectural Route 908 (Samgugyusa-ro)	Yeongcheon City	Hwabuk-myeon	Prefectural Route 908 overlap
Nogwijae Tunnel			Yeongcheon City	Hwabuk-myeon	
Nogwijae Tunnel			Cheongsong County	Hyeonseo-myeon	Prefectural Route 908 overlap Right tunnel: Approximately 953m Left tunnel: Approximately 905m
Sachon IS	사촌 교차로		Cheongsong County	Hyeonseo-myeon	Prefectural Route 908 overlap
Woljeong IS	월정 교차로	Prefectural Route 908 (Seongdeokdaem-ro)	Cheongsong County	Hyeonseo-myeon	Prefectural Route 908 overlap
No name	(이름 없음)	Daljeong-gil	Cheongsong County	Hyeonseo-myeon	
Gusan IS	구산사거리	Prefectural Route 68 (Geumseonghyeonseo-ro)	Cheongsong County	Hyeonseo-myeon	Prefectural Route 68 overlap
No name	(이름 없음)	Prefectural Route 930	Cheongsong County	Hyeonseo-myeon	Prefectural Route 68 overlap Prefectural Route 930 overlap
Deokgye IS	덕계삼거리	Prefectural Route 68 (Cheongsong-ro)	Cheongsong County	Hyeonseo-myeon	Prefectural Route 68 overlap Prefectural Route 930 overlap
Masa Tunnel			Cheongsong County	Hyeonseo-myeon	
Masa Tunnel			Andong City	Giran-myeon	Prefectural Route 930 overlap Approximately 225m
No name	(이름 없음)	Songsasijang-gil	Andong City	Giran-myeon	Prefectural Route 930 overlap
Songseon IS	송선삼거리	Prefectural Route 930 (Daesa-ro)	Andong City	Giran-myeon	Prefectural Route 930 overlap
Geumgok Bridge Goran Bridge	금곡교 고란교		Andong City	Giran-myeon	
Goran IS	고란삼거리	Goran-gil	Andong City	Giran-myeon	
East Andong IC	동안동 나들목	Dangjin-Yeongdeok Expressway	Andong City	Giran-myeon	
Mukgye Bridge Maneum Bridge Myeongdeok Bridge	묵계교 만음교 명덕교		Andong City	Giran-myeon	
Giran-myeon IS (Giran-myeon Office)	길안면사거리 (길안면사무소)	Prefectural Route 914 (Girancheongsong-ro) (Cheonji-gil)	Andong City	Giran-myeon	
Giran IS	길안사거리	Prefectural Route 914 (Uiseonggiran-ro)	Andong City	Giran-myeon	
Geumso Bridge	금소교		Andong City	Imha-myeon	
Geumso IS	금소 교차로	Geumso-gil	Andong City	Imha-myeon	
Sindeok 2 IS	신덕2 교차로	Geumso-gil	Andong City	Imha-myeon	
Sindeok 1 IS	신덕1 교차로	Chunghyo-ro	Andong City	Imha-myeon	
Icheon IS	이천 교차로	National Route 34 (Gyeongdong-ro)	Andong City	Namseon-myeon	National Route 34 overlap
Sinseok IS	신석 교차로	Chunghyo-ro	Andong City	Namseon-myeon	National Route 34 overlap
Sinseok 2 Bridge Sinseok 1 Bridge	신석2교 신석1교		Andong City	Namseon-myeon	National Route 34 overlap
Namseon Tunnel			Andong City	Namseon-myeon	National Route 34 overlap Right tunnel: Approximately 400m Left tunnel: Approximately 460m
Namseon Tunnel			Andong City	Gangnam-dong	National Route 34 overlap Right tunnel: Approximately 400m Left tunnel: Approximately 460m
Jeongsang IS	정상 교차로	National Route 34 (Namsuhwan-ro); Chunghyo-ro	Andong City	Gangnam-dong	National Route 34 overlap
Andong Branch Courts (Daegu District Courts) Andong Public Prosecutor's Office (Daegu District Public Prosecutor's Office)	대구지방법원 안동지원 대구지방검찰청 안동지청		Andong City	Gangnam-dong	
Yeongga Bridge	영가대교 남단	Gangnam-ro	Andong City	Gangnam-dong	
Yeongho Bridge (South end)	영호대교 남단	Gangnam-ro; Undongjang-gil	Andong City	Gangnam-dong	
Yeongho Bridge (Across the bridge)			Andong City	Gangnam-dong	
Yeongho Bridge (Across the bridge)			Andong City	Seogu-dong	
Yeongho Bridge (North end)	영호대교 북단	Yuksa-ro; Jebiwon-ro	Andong City	Seogu-dong	
Cheonri Viaduct (South end) (Andong Culture & Art Center) (Andong Gymnasium)	천리고가교 남단 (안동문화예술의전당) (안동체육관)	Yuksa-ro	Andong City	Junggu-dong	
Cheonri Viaduct (Across the bridge)	천리고가교		Andong City	Junggu-dong	
Cheonri Viaduct (North end)	천리고가교 북단	National Route 34 (Gyeongdong-ro)	Andong City	Junggu-dong	
Mokseong Bridge IS	목성교사거리	Jungang-ro	Andong City	Junggu-dong	
Mokseong Bridge IS	목성교 교차로	Seodongmun-ro	Andong City	Junggu-dong	
Andong City Hall	안동시청		Andong City	Junggu-dong	
Catholic Sangji College IS	가톨릭상지대학 교차로	Danwon-ro	Andong City	Myeongnyun-dong	
Gilwon Girls' High School	길원여자고등학교		Andong City	Myeongnyun-dong	
No name	(이름 없음)	Buksunhwan-ro	Andong City	Myeongnyun-dong	
Ttang Pass	땅고개		Andong City	Waryong-myeon	
Waryong-myeon Office	와룡면사무소		Andong City	Waryong-myeon	
Waryong IS	와룡삼거리	Prefectural Route 933 (Nongam-ro)	Andong City	Waryong-myeon	
Waryong Elementary School	와룡초등학교		Andong City	Waryong-myeon	
No name	(이름 없음)	Wabuk-ro	Andong City	Waryong-myeon	
Gamae IS	감애삼거리	Gamaegusong-ro	Andong City	Waryong-myeon	
Yean Bridge			Andong City	Waryong-myeon	
Yean Bridge			Andong City	Dosan-myeon	
Seobu IS	서부 교차로	Prefectural Route 935 (Nokjeon-ro)	Andong City	Dosan-myeon	
Advanced Center for Korean Studies	한국국학진흥원		Andong City	Dosan-myeon	
Saeteo Bridge	새터교		Andong City	Dosan-myeon	
Dosan Seowon IS	도산서원삼거리	Dosanseowon-gil	Andong City	Dosan-myeon	
Dosan-myeon Office	도산면사무소	Prefectural Route 928 (Baegun-ro)	Andong City	Dosan-myeon	Prefectural Route 928 overlap
Onhye Bus stop	온혜정류소	Prefectural Route 928 (Oncheon-ro)	Andong City	Dosan-myeon	Prefectural Route 928 overlap
Cheongnyangsan Provincial Park	청량산도립공원		Bonghwa County	Myeongho-myeon	
Cheongnyangsan IS	청량산삼거리	Gwangseok-gil	Bonghwa County	Myeongho-myeon	
Gogye IS	고계삼거리	Prefectural Route 918 (Myeongjae-ro)	Bonghwa County	Myeongho-myeon	Prefectural Route 918 overlap
Myeongho Elementary School	명호초등학교		Bonghwa County	Myeongho-myeon	Prefectural Route 918 overlap
Myeongho IS	명호삼거리	Norumokjae-gil; Yangjimaeul-gil	Bonghwa County	Myeongho-myeon	Prefectural Route 918 overlap
Docheon IS	도천삼거리	Prefectural Route 918 (Bongmyeong-ro)	Bonghwa County	Myeongho-myeon	Prefectural Route 918 overlap
Samdong	삼동		Bonghwa County	Myeongho-myeon	Elevation 464m
Okcheon IS	옥천 교차로	National Route 36; Prefectural Route 88 (Socheon-ro)	Bonghwa County	Beopjeon-myeon	National Route 36 overlap Prefectural Route 88 overlap
Eoreumal IS	어르말 교차로	Socheon-ro	Bonghwa County	Beopjeon-myeon	National Route 36 overlap Prefectural Route 88 overlap
Nokdong IS	녹동 교차로		Bonghwa County	Beopjeon-myeon	National Route 36 overlap Prefectural Route 88 overlap
Beopjeon 1 Bridge	법전1교	National Route 31; Prefectural Route 88 (Galsan-ro)	Bonghwa County	Beopjeon-myeon	National Route 31, 36 overlap Prefectural Route 88 overlap
Norujae Tunnel			Bonghwa County	Beopjeon-myeon	
Norujae Tunnel			Bonghwa County	Socheon-myeon	National Route 31, 36 overlap Approximately 1690m
Hyeondong 1 IS	현동1 교차로	National Route 36 (Socheon-ro)	Bonghwa County	Socheon-myeon	National Route 31, 36 overlap
Socheon Middle School Socheon High School	소천중학교 소천고등학교		Bonghwa County	Socheon-myeon	National Route 31 overlap
Hyeondong IS	현동삼거리	Socheon-ro	Bonghwa County	Socheon-myeon	National Route 31 overlap
Neotjae			Bonghwa County	Socheon-myeon	
Neotjae			Bonghwa County	Seokpo-myeon	National Route 31 overlap Elevation 896m
Cheongoksan Natural Recreation Forest	청옥산 자연휴양림		Bonghwa County	Seokpo-myeon	National Route 31 overlap
Yuksongjeong IS	육송정삼거리	Prefectural Route 910 (Cheongok-ro)	Bonghwa County	Seokpo-myeon	National Route 31 overlap Continuation into Gangwon Province

- Expressway

=== Gangwon Province ===
Name	Hangul name	Connection	Location		Note
Dongjeom Station	동점역		Taebaek City	Gumoonso-dong	National Route 31 overlap North Gyeongsang Province - Gangwon Province border line
Gumoonso IS	구문소삼거리	Dongtaebaeng-ro	Taebaek City	Gumoonso-dong	National Route 31 overlap
Dongjeom Tunnel	동점터널		Taebaek City	Gumoonso-dong	National Route 31 overlap Approximately 89.5m
Taebaek Paleozoic Museum	태백고생대자연사박물관		Taebaek City	Gumoonso-dong	National Route 31 overlap
Sintaebaek Bridge Munhwa Bridge	신태백교 문화교		Taebaek City	Gumoonso-dong	National Route 31 overlap
Munhwa Bridge	문화교 북단	Jangseong-ro; Memildeul 1-gil	Taebaek City	Gumoonso-dong	National Route 31 overlap
Jangseong Tunnel			Taebaek City	Gumoonso-dong	
Jangseong Tunnel			Taebaek City	Jangseong-dong	National Route 31 overlap Approximately 450m
Taebaek Elementary School	태백초등학교		Taebaek City	Jangseong-dong	National Route 31 overlap Approximately 450m
Taebaek Stadium Gowon Gymnasium	태백종합경기장 고원체육관		Taebaek City	Mungoksodo-dong	National Route 31 overlap
Sangjang IS	상장삼거리	National Route 31 (Taebaeksan-ro)	Taebaek City	Sangjang-dong	National Route 31 overlap
Sangjang Elementary School Sangjang Middle School	상장초등학교 상장중학교		Taebaek City	Sangjang-dong	
Mungok Station	문곡역		Taebaek City	Sangjang-dong	
Sangjang-dong Community Center Taebaek Fire Station	상장동주민센터 태백소방서		Taebaek City	Sangjang-dong	
No name	(이름 없음)	Beonyeong-ro	Taebaek City	Hwangji-dong	
Hwangji Bridge IS	황지교사거리	National Route 38 (Gangwonnambu-ro)	Taebaek City	Hwangji-dong	National Route 38 overlap
Taebaek Health Center	태백시보건소		Taebaek City	Hwangji-dong	National Route 38 overlap
Hwangji Joongang Elementary School Taeseo Elementary School	황지중앙초등학교 태서초등학교		Taebaek City	Hwangyeon-dong	National Route 38 overlap
Hwajeon IS	화전사거리	National Route 38 (Taebaek-ro)	Taebaek City	Samsoo-dong	National Route 38 overlap
Taebaek Water Treatment Plant (Korea Water Resources Corporation)	수자원공사 태백권관리단		Taebaek City	Hwangyeon-dong	
Pijae (Samsuryeong)	피재(삼수령)		Taebaek City	Samsoo-dong	
Midong Elementary School Entrance	(미동초등학교입구)	Prefectural Route 424 (Yeokdunwonding-ro)	Taebaek City	Samsoo-dong	Prefectural Route 424 overlap
Sangsami Bridge	상사미교 서단	Prefectural Route 424 (Geonuiryeong-ro)	Taebaek City	Samsoo-dong	Prefectural Route 424 overlap
Sajo Health Clinic	사조보건진료소		Taebaek City	Samsoo-dong	
Sukam 2 Bridge			Taebaek City	Samsoo-dong	
Sukam 2 Bridge			Samcheok City	Hajang-myeon	
Sukam IS	숙암삼거리	Prefectural Route 28 (Duta-ro)	Samcheok City	Hajang-myeon	Prefectural Route 28 overlap
Gwangdong Dam	광동댐		Samcheok City	Hajang-myeon	Prefectural Route 28 overlap
Hajang-myeon Office Hajang Middle School Hajang High School	하장면사무소 하장중학교 하장고등학교		Samcheok City	Hajang-myeon	Prefectural Route 28 overlap
Jangjeon IS	장전삼거리	Prefectural Route 28 (Odujae-ro)	Samcheok City	Hajang-myeon	Prefectural Route 28 overlap
Nature monument	삼척 갈전리 당숲		Samcheok City	Hajang-myeon	
Tosan IS	토산삼거리	Prefectural Route 421 (Beolmunjae-ro)	Samcheok City	Hajang-myeon	
Eunchi Bridge			Samcheok City	Hajang-myeon	
Eunchi Bridge			Jeongseon County	Imgye-myeon	
Woltan Bridge Hyeolcheon Bridge	월탄교 혈천교		Jeongseon County	Imgye-myeon	
Imgye Middle School Imgye High School	임계중학교 임계고등학교		Jeongseon County	Imgye-myeon	
Imgye IS	임계사거리	National Route 42 (Seodong-ro)	Jeongseon County	Imgye-myeon	
Beodeul Pass	버들고개		Jeongseon County	Imgye-myeon	
Godan IS	고단삼거리	Prefectural Route 410 (Choui-ro)	Gangneung City	Wangsan-myeon	
Sapdangryeong	삽당령		Gangneung City	Wangsan-myeon	Elevation 680m
Wangsan-myeon Office Wangsan Middle School Wangsan Elementary School	왕산면사무소 왕산중학교 왕산초등학교		Gangneung City	Wangsan-myeon	
Obong IS	오봉삼거리	Prefectural Route 415 (Choui-ro)	Gangneung City	Wangsan-myeon	
Seongsan IS	성산삼거리	Prefectural Route 456 (Gyeonggang-ro)	Gangneung City	Seongsan-myeon	
Seongsan-myeon Office Seongsan Elementary School	성산면사무소 성산초등학교		Gangneung City	Seongsan-myeon	
No name	(이름 없음)	Prefectural Route 456 (Gyeonggang-ro)	Gangneung City	Seongsan-myeon	
No name	(이름 없음)	Hoesan-ro	Gangneung City	Seongsan-myeon	
Gangneung IC	강릉 나들목	Donghae Expressway	Gangneung City	Seongsan-myeon	
Jangan IS	장안 교차로	Saimdang-ro	Gangneung City	Hongje-dong	
Hongje Overpass	홍제육교	Gangneung-daero	Gangneung City	Hongje-dong	Under National Route 7
Hongje-dong Community Center	홍제동주민자치센터		Gangneung City	Hongje-dong	
Nammun IS	남문사거리	Gangbyeon-ro; Hongje-ro	Gangneung City	Jungang-dong	
Gangneung Medical Center Gangneung Imyeonggwan	강릉의료원 강릉 임영관		Gangneung City	Jungang-dong	
Gaeksamun IS	객사문사거리	Imnyeong-ro	Gangneung City	Jungang-dong	
Okcheon IS (5-way IS)	옥천오거리	Gyeonggang-ro; Okga-ro; Yulgok-ro	Gangneung City	Okcheon-dong	Terminus
