= Cheongoksan =

Cheongoksan (청옥산; 靑玉山) refers to three mountains in South Korea:

- Cheongoksan (Jeongseon/Pyeongchang) in Gangwon-do
- Cheongoksan (Donghae/Samcheok) in Gangwon-do
- Cheongoksan (North Gyeongsang) in Bongwha County, Gyeongsangbuk-do
