= Namsanjeong station =

Station of the Busan Metro

311 남산정 (부산폴리텍대학) Namsanjeong (Busan Polytechnic Univ.)
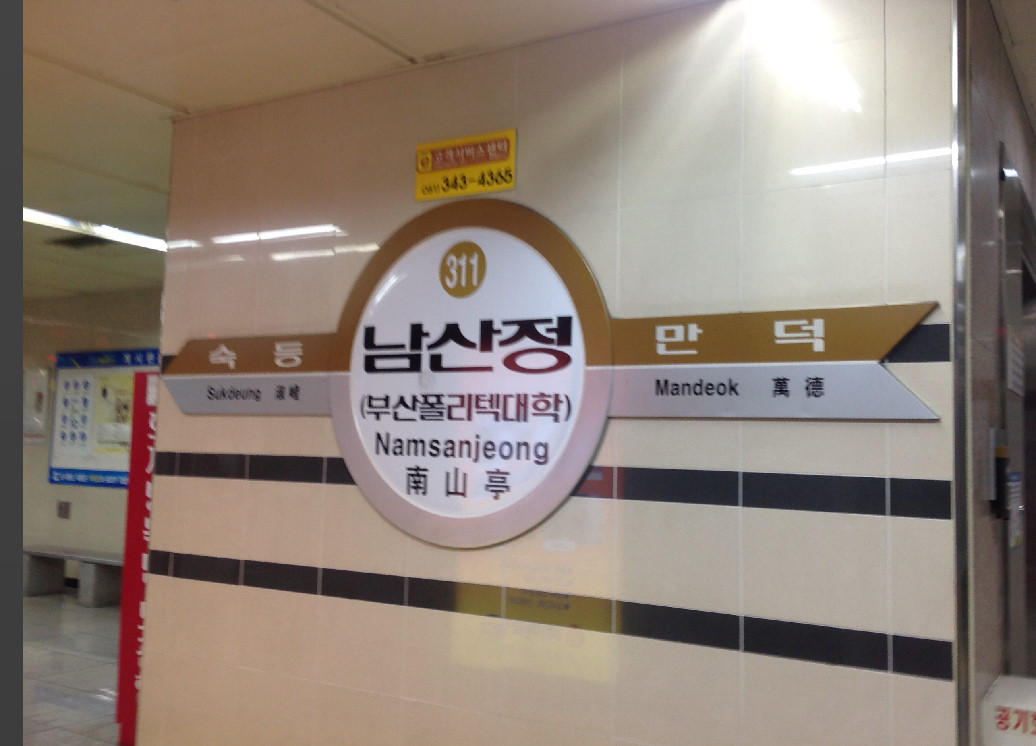

Korean name
- Hangul: 남산정역
- Hanja: 南山亭驛
- Revised Romanization: Namsanjeong yeok
- McCune–Reischauer: Namsanchŏng yŏk

General information
- Location: Mandeok-dong, Buk District, Busan; South Korea
- Coordinates: 35.2133°N 129.0239°E
- Operator: Busan Transportation Corporation
- Line: Busan Metro Line 3
- Platforms: 2
- Tracks: 2

Construction
- Structure type: Underground

Other information
- Station code: 311

History
- Opened: November 28, 2005
Location

Namsanjeong Station (Korean: 남산정역; Hanja: 南山亭驛) is a station of Busan Metro Line 3 in Mandeok-dong, Buk District, Busan, South Korea.

Preceding station	Busan Metro	Following station
Mandeok towards Suyeong	Line 3	Sukdeung towards Daejeo
