= Hwamyeong station (Busan Metro) =

Station of the Busan Metro

235 화명 (더 퍼스트 피부과의원) Hwamyeong (The First Dermatology Department Clinic)
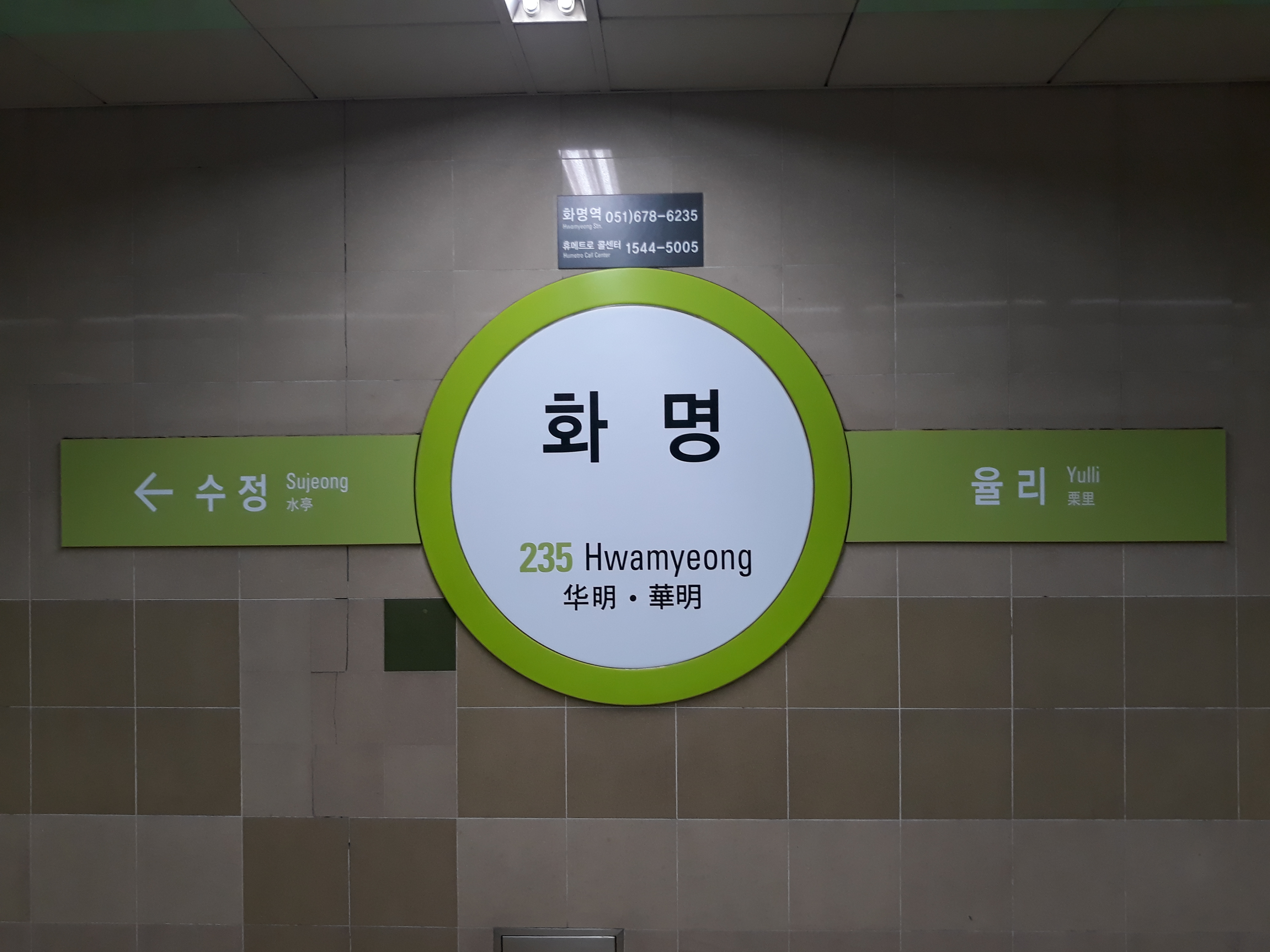

General information
- Coordinates: 35.23625°N 129.01392°E
- Operator: Busan Transportation Corporation
- Line: Busan Metro Line 2
- Platforms: 2
- Tracks: 2

Construction
- Structure type: Underground

Other information
- Station code: 235

History
- Opened: June 30, 1999; 27 years ago
Location

Hwamyeong Station (Korean: 화명역; Hanja: 華明驛) is a station on the Busan Metro Line 2 in Hwamyeong-dong, Buk District, in the northwestern part of Busan, South Korea. It was one of the first stations opened on the line in 1999.

On August 25, 2014, the station suffered severe damage due to flooding brought by the Korean monsoon season, causing a section of the subway line from Gumyeong Station to Hopo Station to shut down temporarily.

Preceding station	Busan Metro	Following station
Sujeong towards Jangsan	Line 2	Yulli towards Yangsan
