= Sujeong station =

Station of the Busan Metro

234 수정 (한국방송통신대) Sujeong (Korea Nat'l Open Univ.)
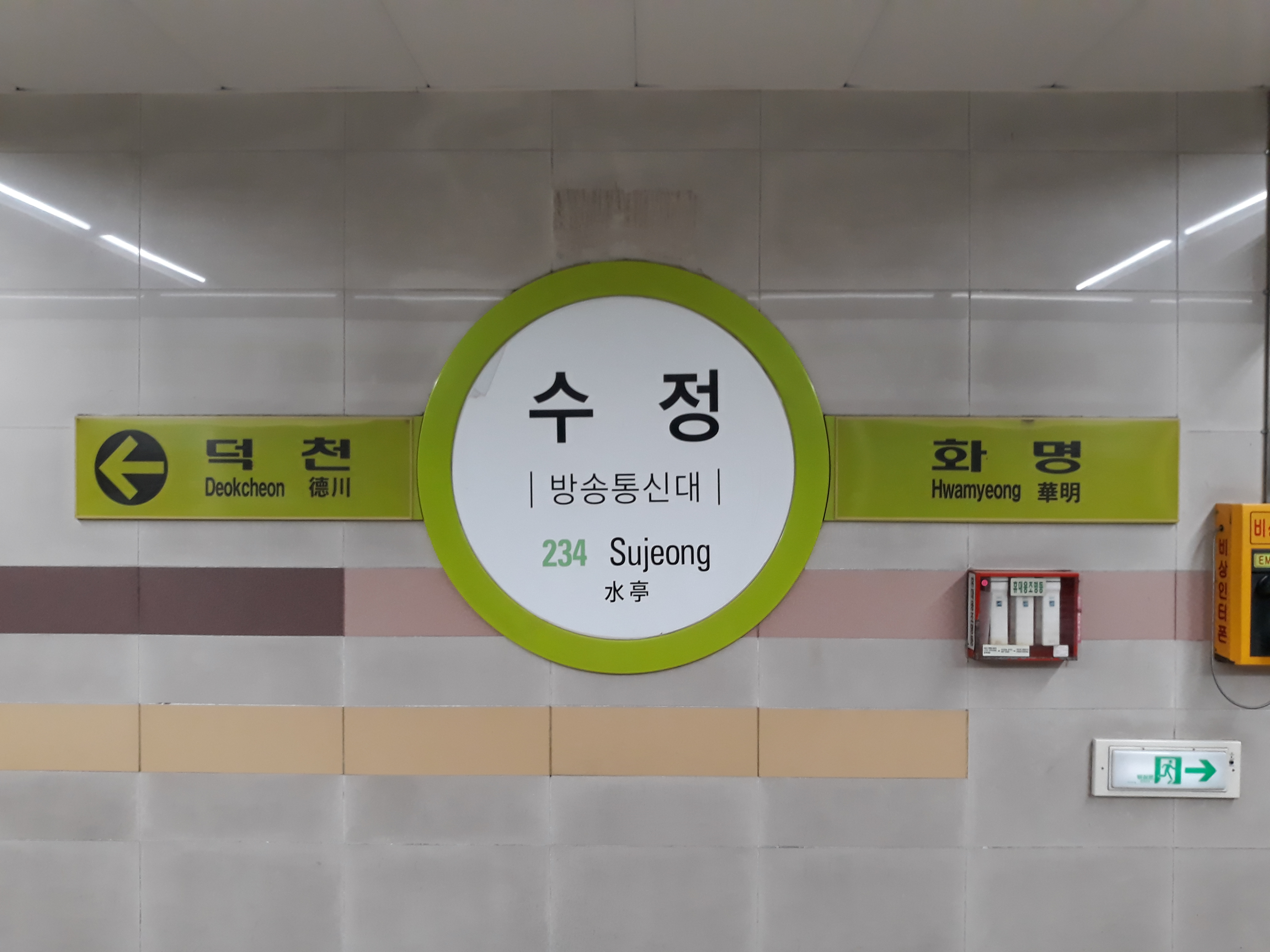

Korean name
- Hangul: 수정역
- Hanja: 水亭驛
- Revised Romanization: Sujang yeok
- McCune–Reischauer: Suchŏng yŏk

General information
- Location: Hwamyeong-dong, Buk District, Busan; South Korea
- Coordinates: 35.2233°N 129.0091°E
- Operator: Busan Transportation Corporation
- Line: Busan Metro Line 2
- Platforms: 2
- Tracks: 2

Construction
- Structure type: Underground

Other information
- Station code: 234

History
- Opened: June 30, 1999; 27 years ago
Location

Sujeong Station (Korean: 수정역; Hanja: 水亭驛) is a station on the Busan Metro Line 2 in Hwamyeong-dong, Buk District, Busan, South Korea.

Preceding station	Busan Metro	Following station
Deokcheon towards Jangsan	Line 2	Hwamyeong towards Yangsan
