= Geumgok station =

Geumgok station (Korean: 금곡역) is a railroad station in South Korea.

- Geumgok station (Namyangju)
- Geumgok station (Busan Metro)
