= Mandeok station =

Station of the Busan Metro

310 만덕 Mandeok
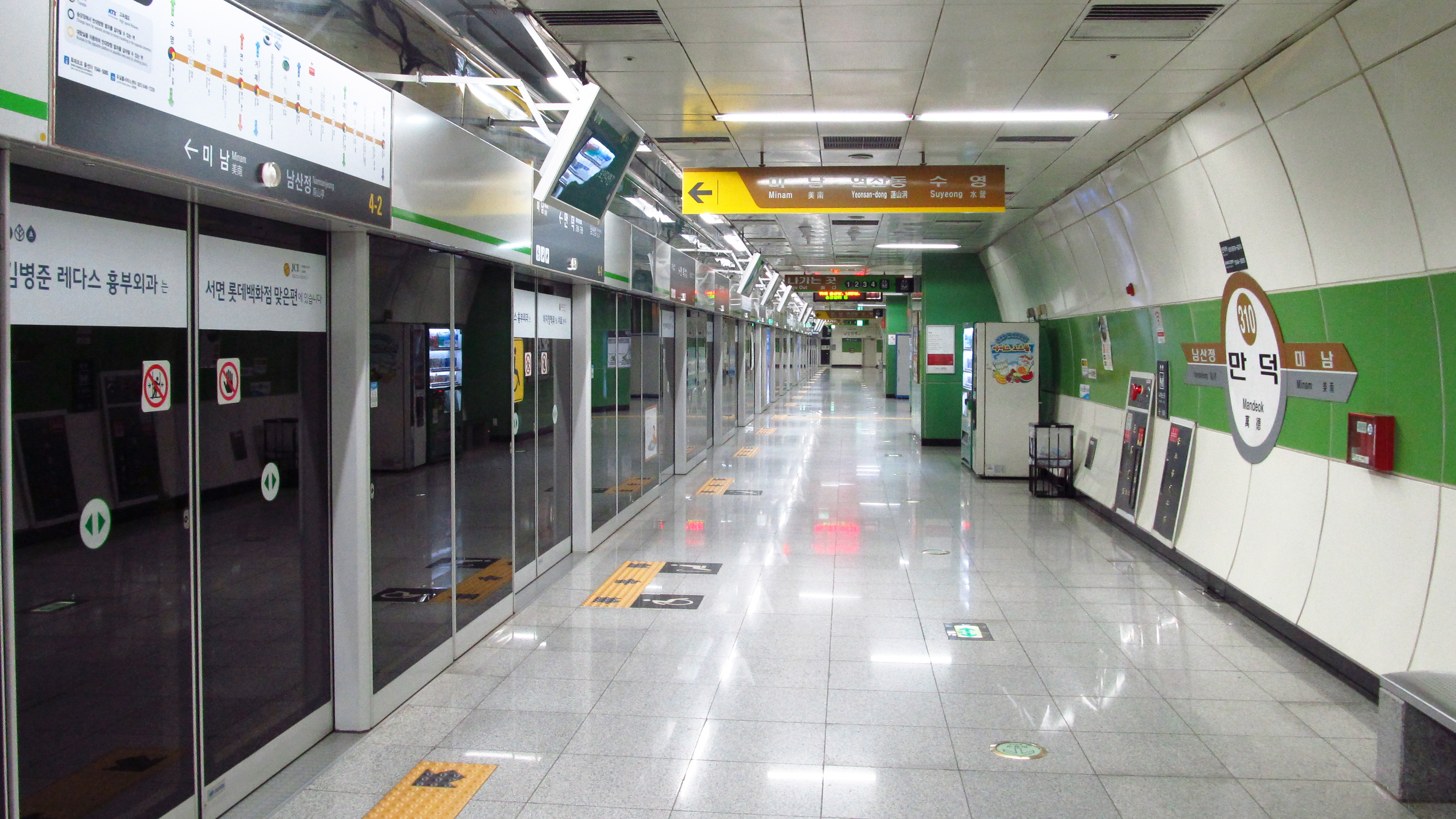

Korean name
- Hangul: 만덕역
- Hanja: 萬德驛
- Revised Romanization: Mandeok yeok
- McCune–Reischauer: Man tŏk yŏk

General information
- Location: Mandeok-dong, Buk District, Busan; South Korea
- Coordinates: 35.2130°N 129.0365°E
- Operator: Busan Transportation Corporation
- Line: Busan Metro Line 3
- Platforms: 2
- Tracks: 2

Construction
- Structure type: Underground

Other information
- Station code: 310

History
- Opened: November 28, 2005

Services
Preceding station	Busan Metro	Following station
Minam towards Suyeong	Line 3	Namsanjeong towards Daejeo
Location

Mandeok Station (Korean: 만덕역; Hanja: 萬德驛) is a station of Busan Metro Line 3 in Mandeok-dong, Buk District, Busan, South Korea.
