= Gunam station =

Station of the Busan Metro

231 구남 Gunam
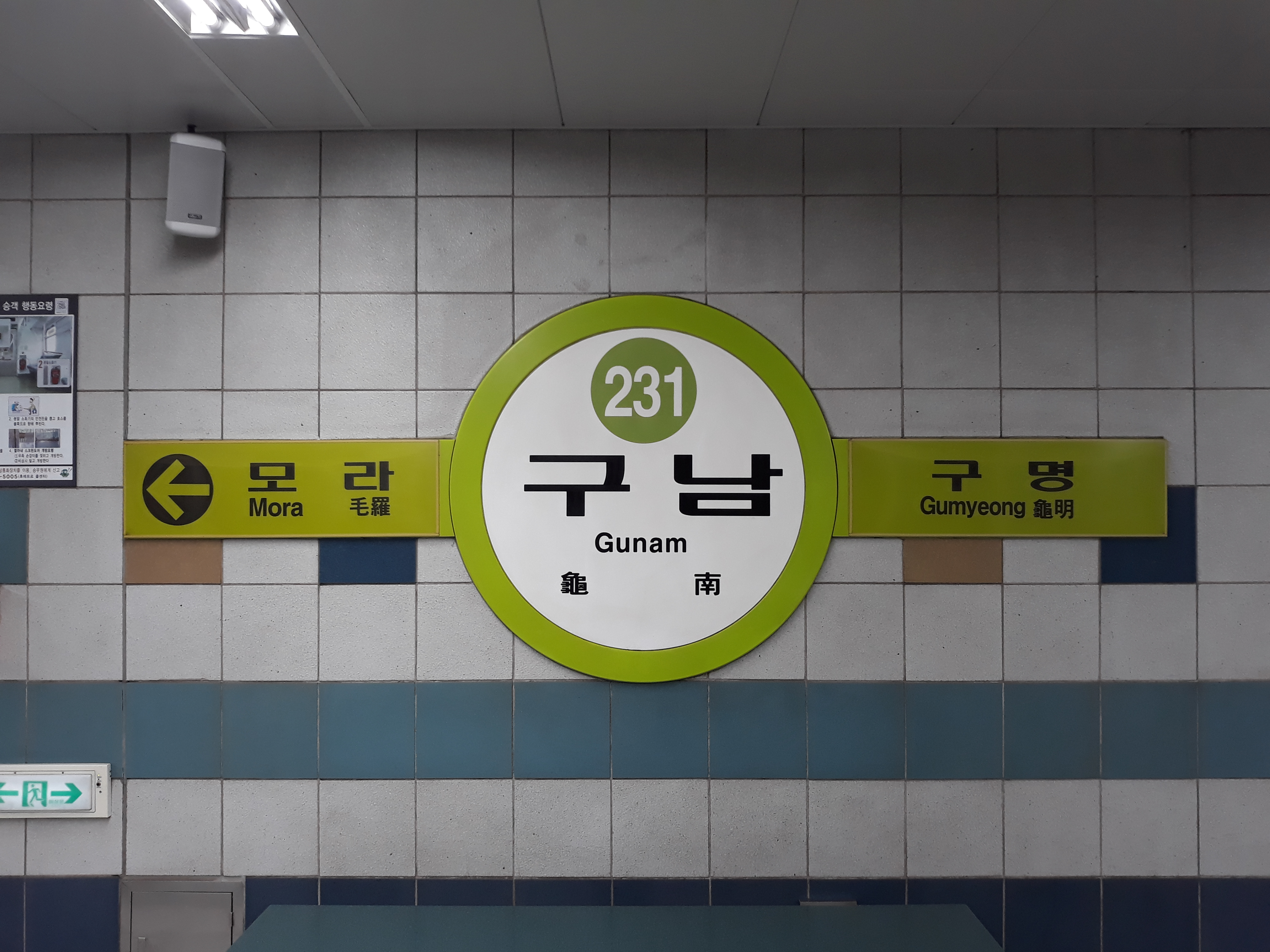

Korean name
- Hangul: 구남역
- Hanja: 龜南驛
- Revised Romanization: Gunam-yeok
- McCune–Reischauer: Kunam-yŏk

General information
- Location: Gupo-dong, Buk District, Busan; South Korea
- Coordinates: 35.1969°N 128.9949°E
- Operator: Busan Transportation Corporation
- Line: Busan Metro Line 2
- Platforms: 2
- Tracks: 2

Construction
- Structure type: Underground

Other information
- Station code: 231

History
- Opened: June 30, 1999; 27 years ago
Location

Gunam Station (Korean: 구남역) is a station on the Busan Metro Line 2 in Gupo-dong, Buk District, Busan, South Korea.

Preceding station	Busan Metro	Following station
Mora towards Jangsan	Line 2	Gumyeong towards Yangsan
