= 덕천역 =

덕천역 (德川驛) may refer to stations:

- Deokcheon Station, railway station on the Line 2 and Line 3 of Busan Metro
- Tŏkch'ŏn Station, railway station on the Pyongdok Line of Korean State Railway
