= Sukdeung station =

Station of the Busan Metro

312 숙등 Sukdeung
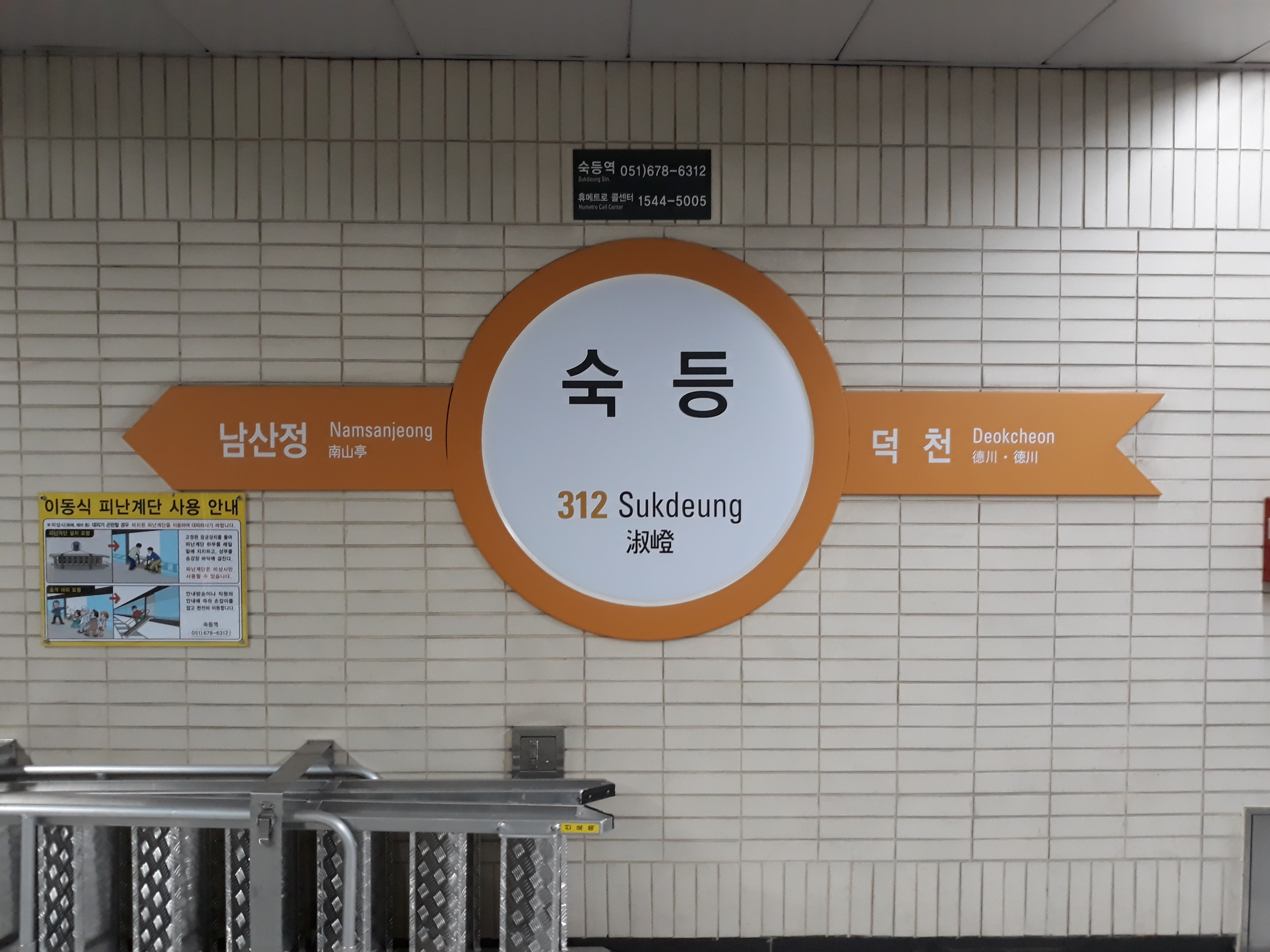

Korean name
- Hangul: 숙등역
- Hanja: 淑嶝驛
- Revised Romanization: Sukdeung yeok
- McCune–Reischauer: Suktŭng yŏk

General information
- Location: Deokcheon-dong, Buk District, Busan; South Korea
- Coordinates: 35.2120°N 129.0128°E
- Operator: Busan Transportation Corporation
- Line: Busan Metro Line 3
- Platforms: 2
- Tracks: 2

Construction
- Structure type: Underground

Other information
- Station code: 312

History
- Opened: November 28, 2005
Location

Sukdeung Station (Korean: 숙등역; Hanja: 淑嶝驛) is a station of the Busan Metro Line 3 in Deokcheon-dong, Buk District, Busan, South Korea.

Preceding station	Busan Metro	Following station
Namsanjeong towards Suyeong	Line 3	Deokcheon towards Daejeo
