= Mora station =

Station of the Busan Metro

230 모라 Mora
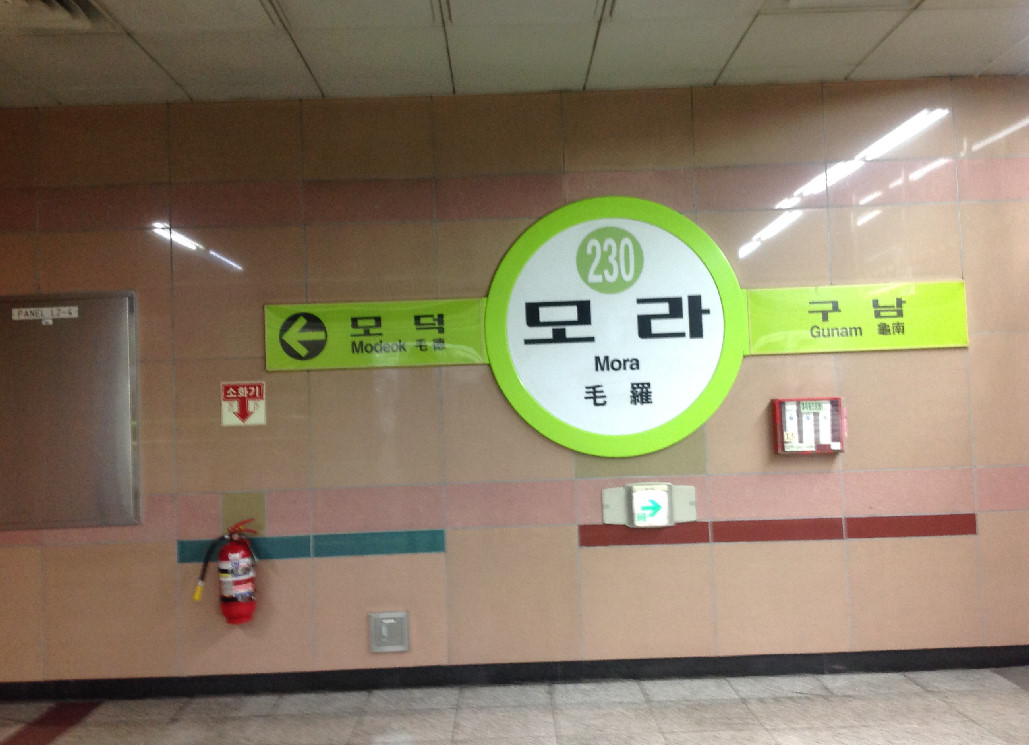

Korean name
- Hangul: 모라역
- Hanja: 毛羅驛
- Revised Romanization: Mora yeok
- McCune–Reischauer: Mora yŏk

General information
- Location: Mora-dong, Sasang District, Busan; South Korea
- Coordinates: 35.1896°N 128.9885°E
- Operator: Busan Transportation Corporation
- Line: Busan Metro Line 2
- Platforms: 2
- Tracks: 2

Construction
- Structure type: Underground

Other information
- Station code: 230

History
- Opened: June 30, 1999; 27 years ago
Location

Mora Station (Korean: 모라역; Hanja: 毛羅驛) is a station on the Busan Metro Line 2 in Mora-dong, Sasang District, Busan, South Korea. Not to be confused with Moran in Seoul.

Preceding station	Busan Metro	Following station
Modeok towards Jangsan	Line 2	Gunam towards Yangsan
