= Deokpo station =

Station of the Busan Metro

228 덕포 (부산도서관) Deokpo (Busan Library)
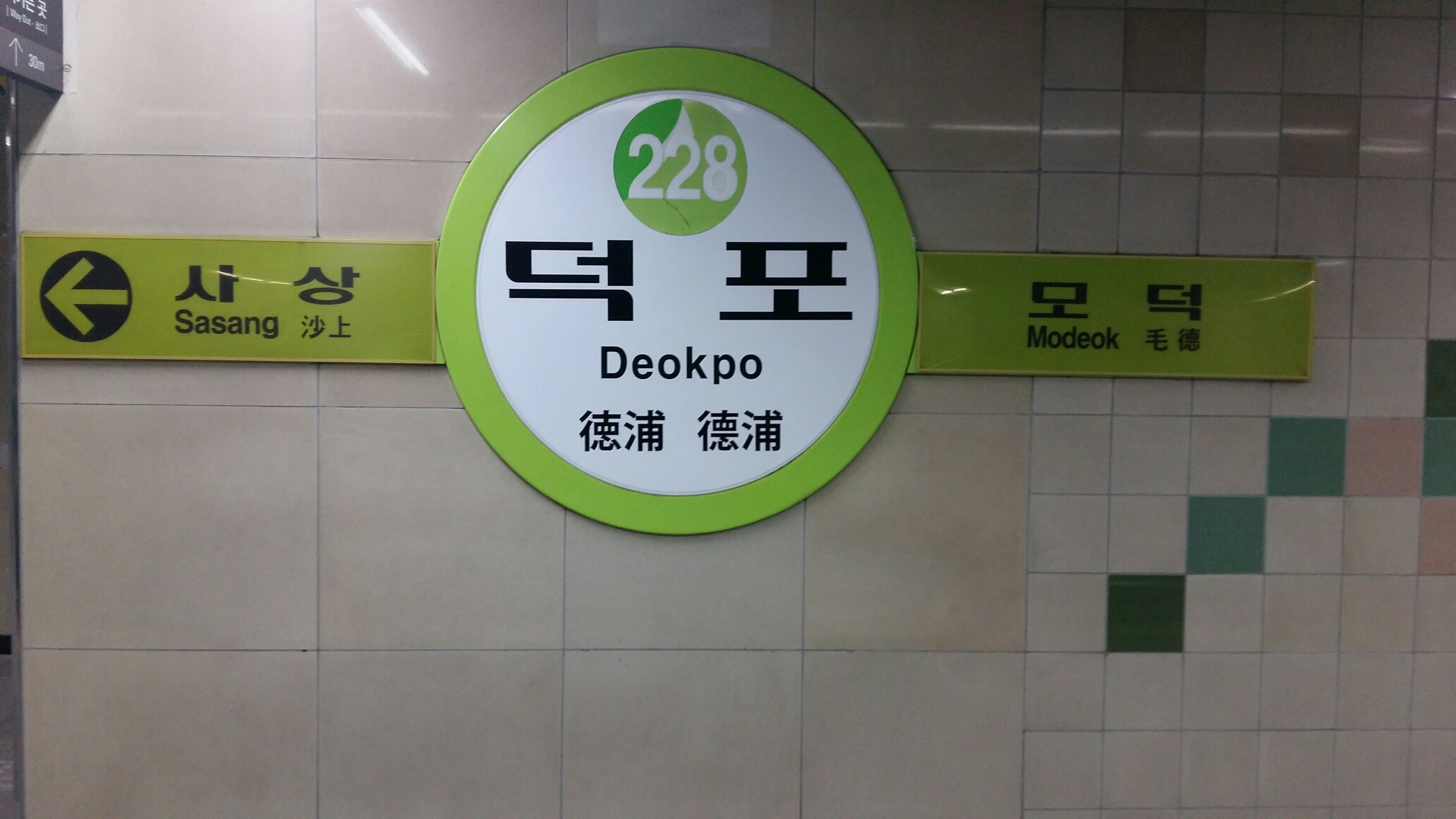

Korean name
- Hangul: 덕포역
- Hanja: 德浦驛
- Revised Romanization: Deokpo-yeok
- McCune–Reischauer: Tŏkp'o-yŏk

General information
- Location: Deokpo-dong, Sasang District, Busan; South Korea
- Coordinates: 35.1739°N 128.9840°E
- Operator: Busan Transportation Corporation
- Line: Busan Metro Line 2
- Platforms: 2
- Tracks: 2

Construction
- Structure type: Underground

Other information
- Station code: 228

History
- Opened: June 30, 1999; 27 years ago
Location

Deokpo Station (Korean: 덕포역) is a station on the Busan Metro Line 2 in Deokpo-dong, Sasang District, Busan, South Korea.

Preceding station	Busan Metro	Following station
Sasang towards Jangsan	Line 2	Modeok towards Yangsan
