= Yulli station =

Metro station in Busan, South Korea

236 율리 (KT금곡지점) Yulli (KT Geumgok Branch)
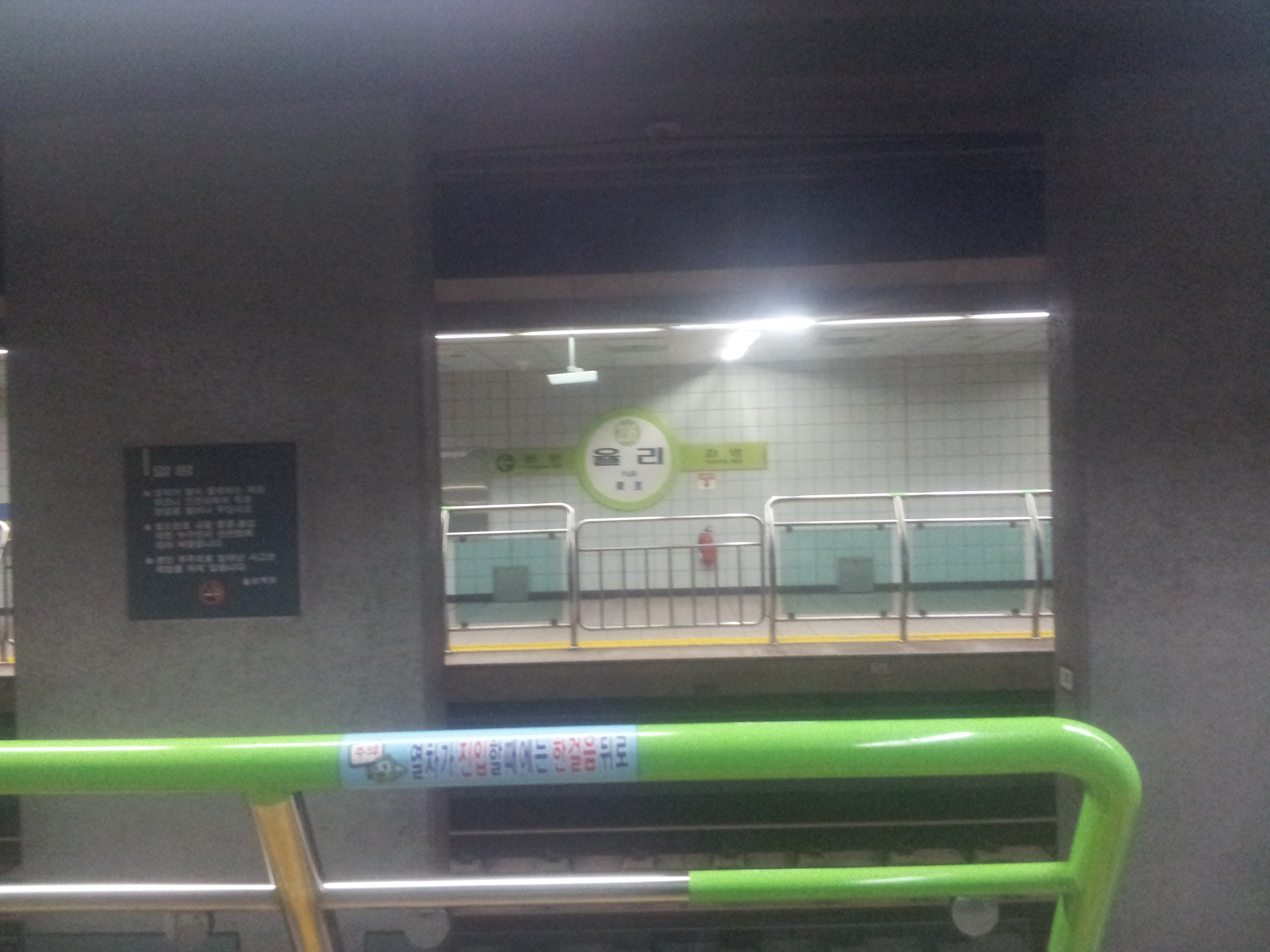

Korean name
- Hangul: 율리역
- Hanja: 栗里驛
- Revised Romanization: Yulri yeok
- McCune–Reischauer: Yulri yŏk

General information
- Location: Geumgok-dong, Buk District, Busan; South Korea
- Coordinates: 35.2465°N 129.0129°E
- Operator: Busan Transportation Corporation
- Line: Busan Metro Line 2
- Platforms: 2
- Tracks: 2

Construction
- Structure type: Underground

Other information
- Station code: 236

History
- Opened: June 30, 1999; 27 years ago
Location

Yulli Station (Korean: 율리역; Hanja: 栗里驛) is a station on the Busan Metro Line 2 in Geumgok-dong, Buk District, Busan, South Korea.

Preceding station	Busan Metro	Following station
Hwamyeong towards Jangsan	Line 2	Dongwon towards Yangsan
