= Gumyeong station =

Station of the Busan Metro

232 구명 Gumyeong
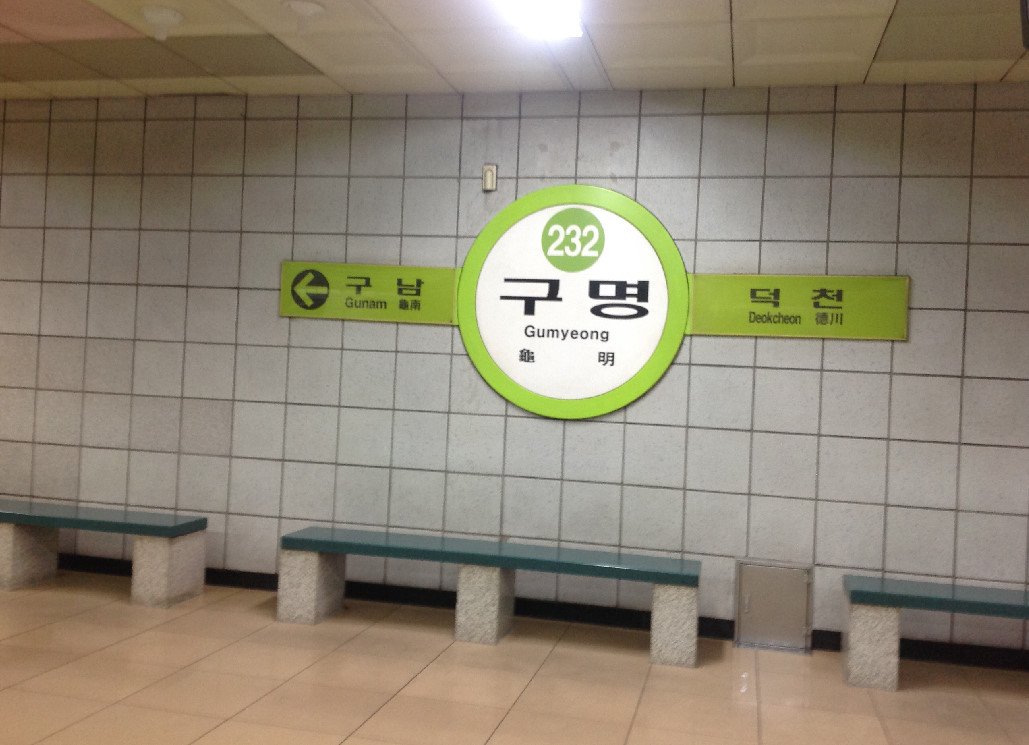

Korean name
- Hangul: 구명역
- Hanja: 龜明驛
- Revised Romanization: Gumyeong-yeok
- McCune–Reischauer: Kumyong-yŏk

General information
- Location: Gupo-dong, Buk District, Busan; South Korea
- Coordinates: 35.2028°N 128.9995°E
- Operator: Busan Transportation Corporation
- Line: Busan Metro Line 2
- Platforms: 2
- Tracks: 2

Construction
- Structure type: Underground

Other information
- Station code: 232

History
- Opened: June 30, 1999; 27 years ago
Location

Gumyeong Station (Korean: 구명역) is a station on the Busan Metro Line 2 in Gupo-dong, Buk District, Busan, South Korea.

| Preceding station | Busan Metro | Following station |
|---|---|---|
| Gunam towards Jangsan | Line 2 | Deokcheon towards Yangsan |
