= Dongwon station =

Station of the Busan Metro

237 동원 Dongwon
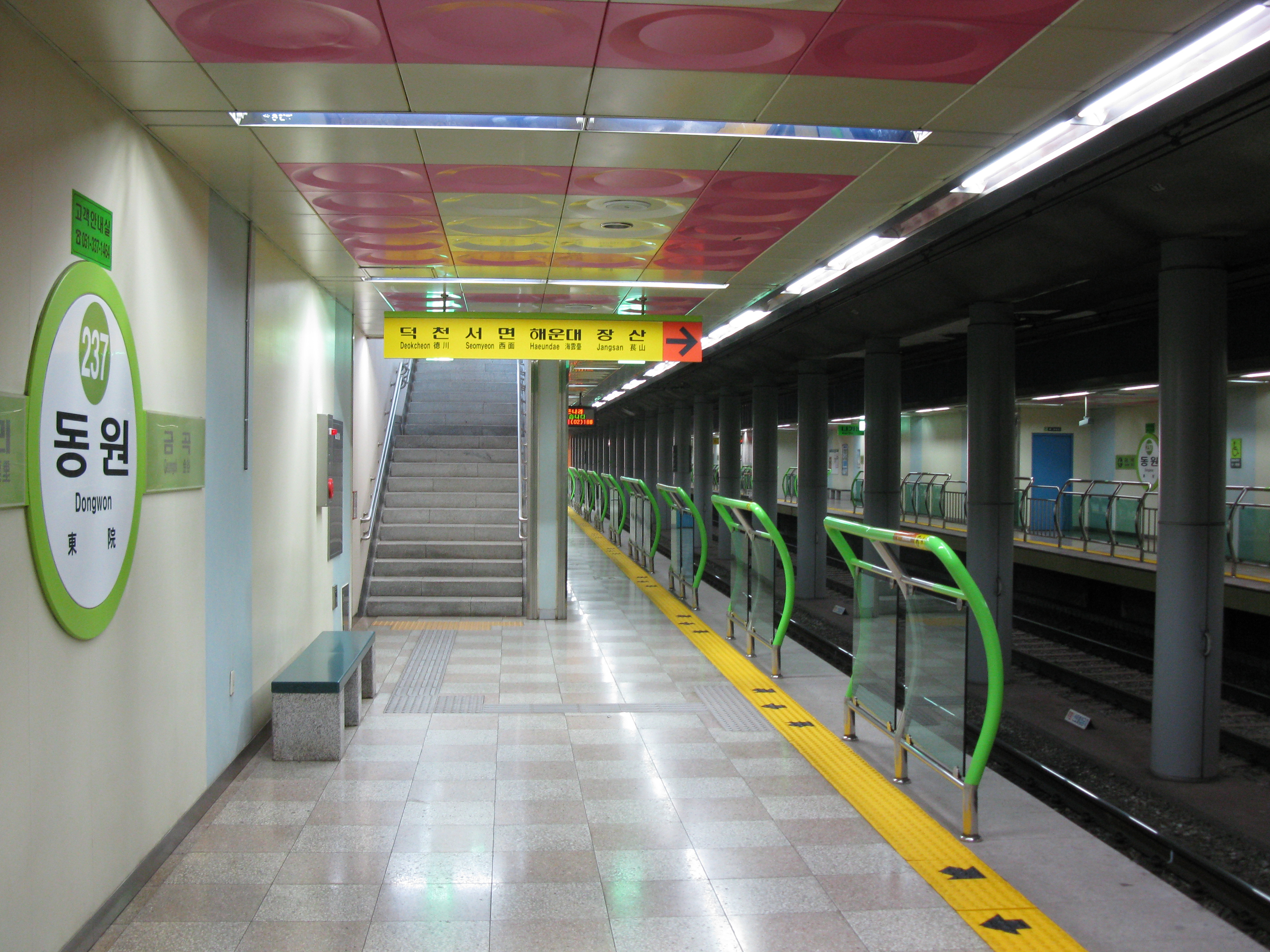

Korean name
- Hangul: 동원역
- Hanja: 東院驛
- Revised Romanization: Dongwon-yeok
- McCune–Reischauer: Tongwŏn-yŏk

General information
- Location: Geumgok-dong, Buk District, Busan; South Korea
- Coordinates: 35.2586°N 129.0124°E
- Operator: Busan Transportation Corporation
- Line: Busan Metro Line 2
- Platforms: 2
- Tracks: 2

Construction
- Structure type: Underground

Other information
- Station code: 237

History
- Opened: June 30, 1999; 27 years ago
Location

Dongwon Station (Korean: 동원역) is a station on the Busan Metro Line 2 in Geumgok-dong, Buk District, Busan, South Korea.

Preceding station	Busan Metro	Following station
Yulli towards Jangsan	Line 2	Geumgok towards Yangsan
