= Modeok station =

Station of the Busan Metro

229 모덕 Modeok
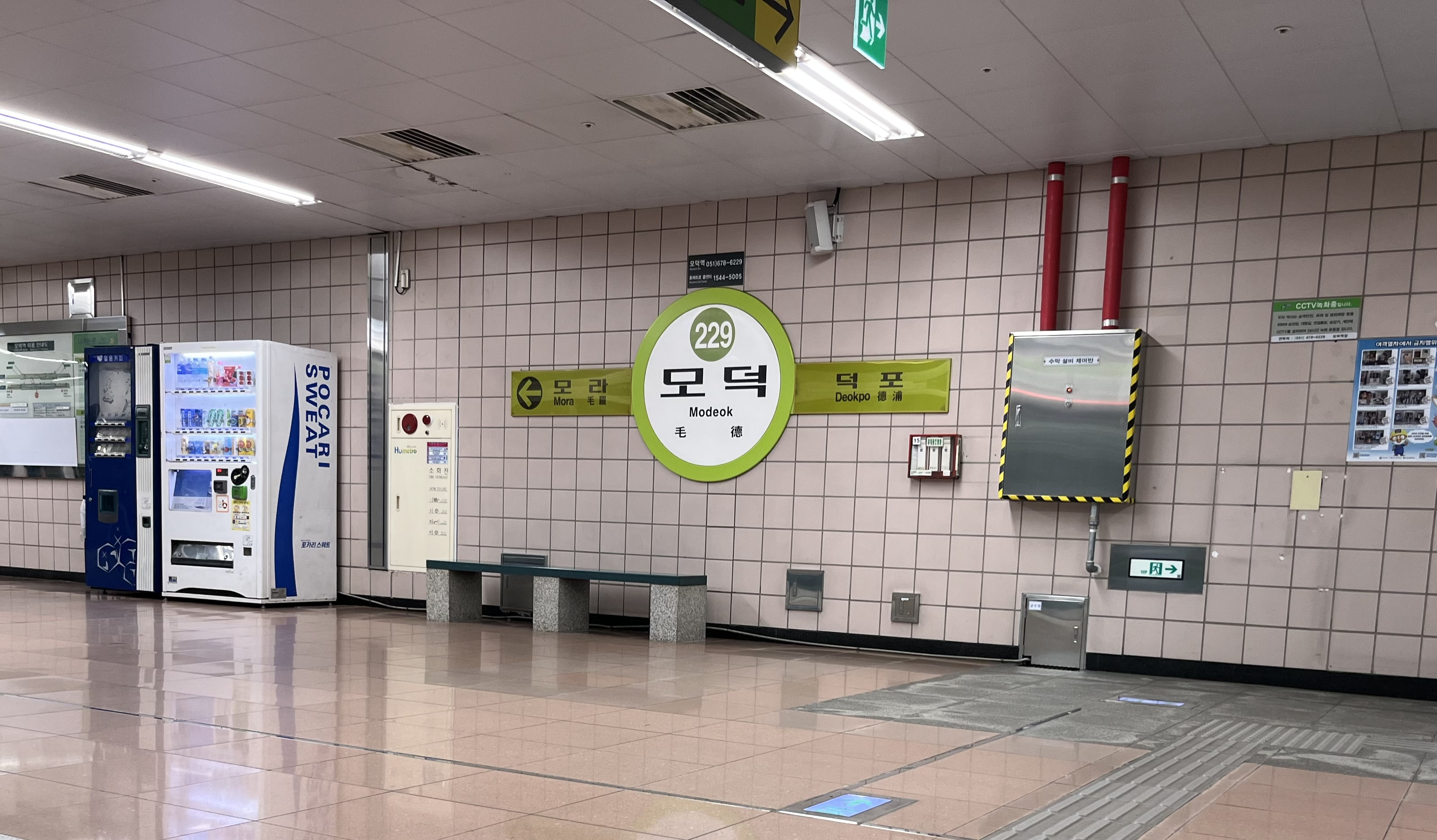

Korean name
- Hangul: 모덕역
- Hanja: 毛德驛
- Revised Romanization: Mydaek yeok
- McCune–Reischauer: Motŏk yŏk

General information
- Location: Deokpo-dong, Sasang District, Busan; South Korea
- Coordinates: 35.1804°N 128.9856°E
- Operator: Busan Transportation Corporation
- Line: Busan Metro Line 2
- Platforms: 2
- Tracks: 2

Construction
- Structure type: Underground

Other information
- Station code: 229

History
- Opened: June 30, 1999; 27 years ago
Location

Modeok Station (Korean: 모덕역; Hanja: 毛德驛) is a station on the Busan Metro Line 2 in Deokpo-dong, Sasang District, Busan, South Korea.

| Preceding station | Busan Metro | Following station |
|---|---|---|
| Deokpo towards Jangsan | Line 2 | Mora towards Yangsan |
