= Deokcheon station =

Station of the Busan Metro

233 313 덕천 Deokcheon
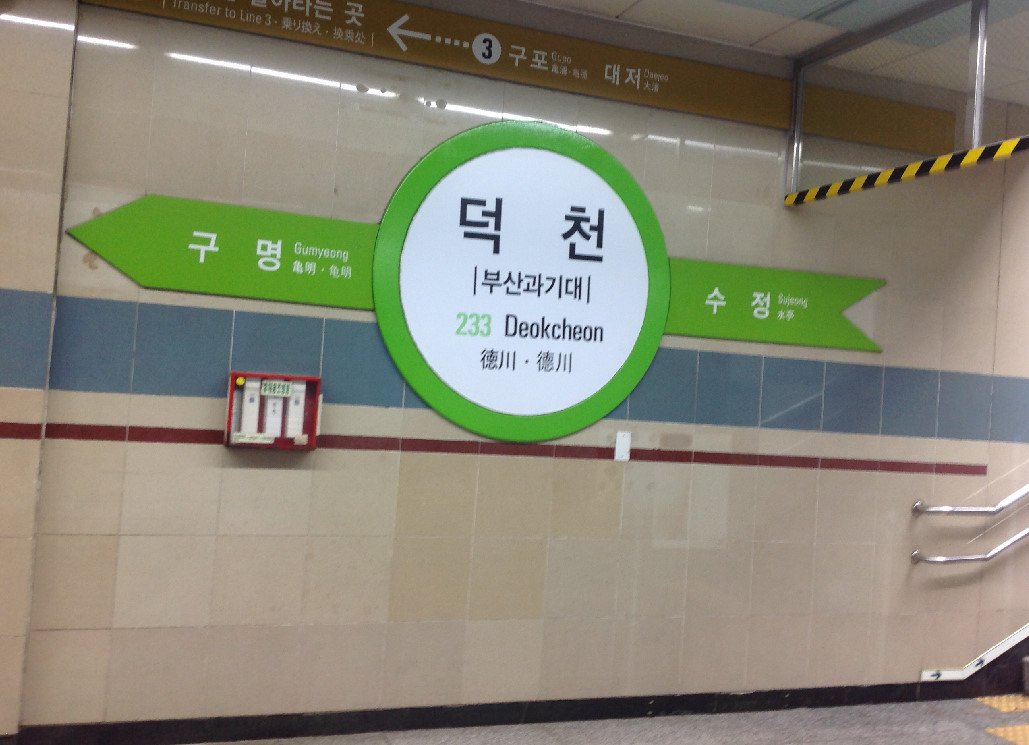
- Station Sign (Line 2)

Korean name
- Hangul: 덕천역
- Hanja: 德川驛
- Revised Romanization: Deokcheonnyeok
- McCune–Reischauer: Tŏkch'ŏnnyŏk

General information
- Location: Deokcheon-dong, Buk District, Busan; South Korea
- Coordinates: 35°12′36.45″N 129°0′19.25″E
- Operator: Busan Transportation Corporation
- Lines: Line 2 and Line 3
- Platforms: ● Line 2: 2 ● Line 3: 1
- Tracks: ● Line 2: 2 ● Line 3: 2

Construction
- Structure type: Underground
- Accessible: yes

Other information
- Station code: ● Line 2: 233 ● Line 3: 313

History
- Opened: ● Line 2: June 30, 1999; 27 years ago ● Line 3: November 28, 2005; 20 years ago

Services
Preceding station	Busan Metro	Following station
Gumyeong towards Jangsan	Line 2	Sujeong towards Yangsan
Sukdeung towards Suyeong	Line 3	Gupo towards Daejeo
Location

Deokcheon Station is a station on the Busan Metro Line 2 and Line 3 located in Deokcheon-dong, Buk District, Busan.

== Station facilities ==
A commercial area is located inside the station, including a McDonald's and an outlet store, both of which were the top 10 populated commercial areas in Busan on weekends in 2010.

== Gallery ==
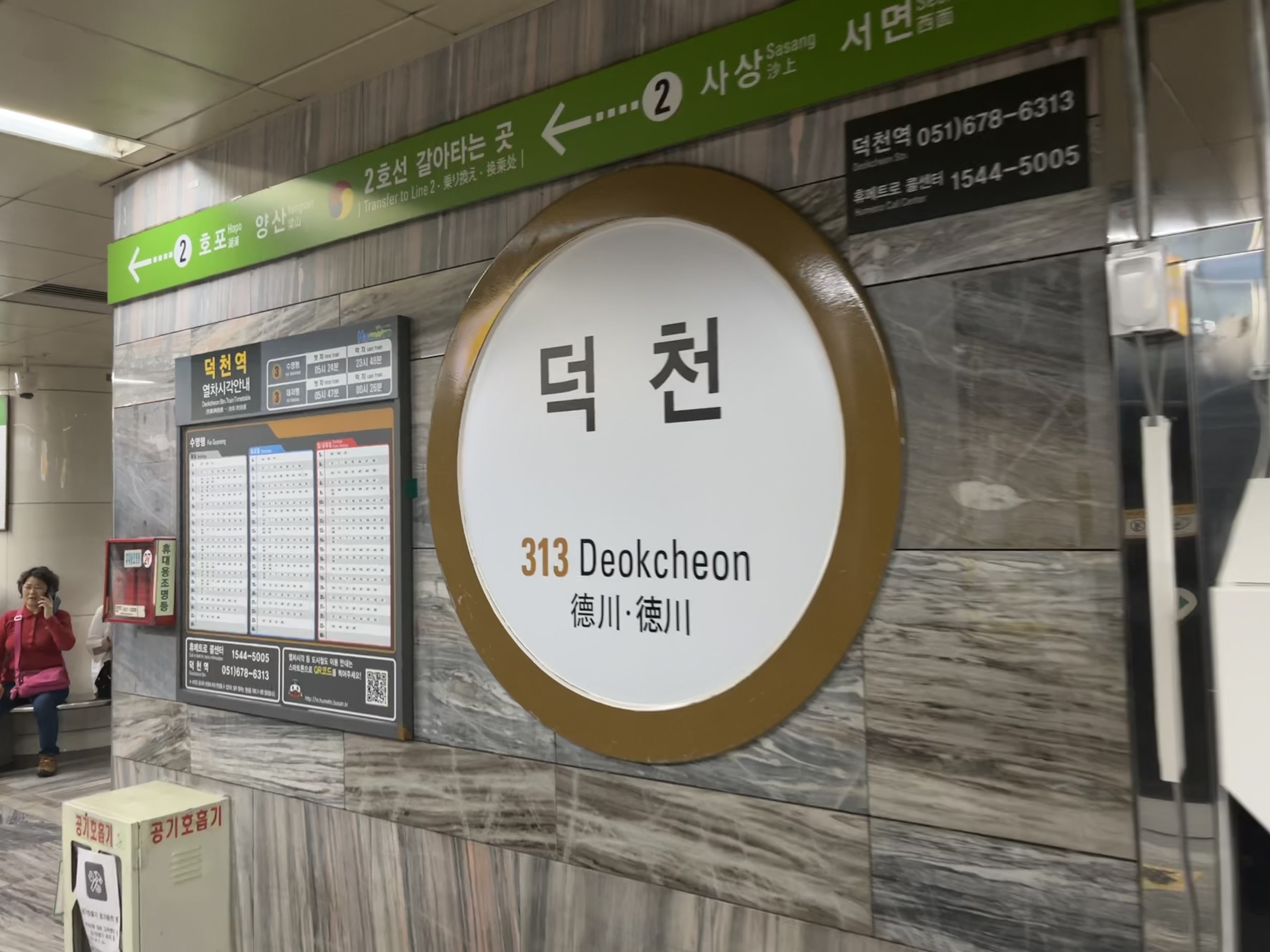
Station sign (Line 3)

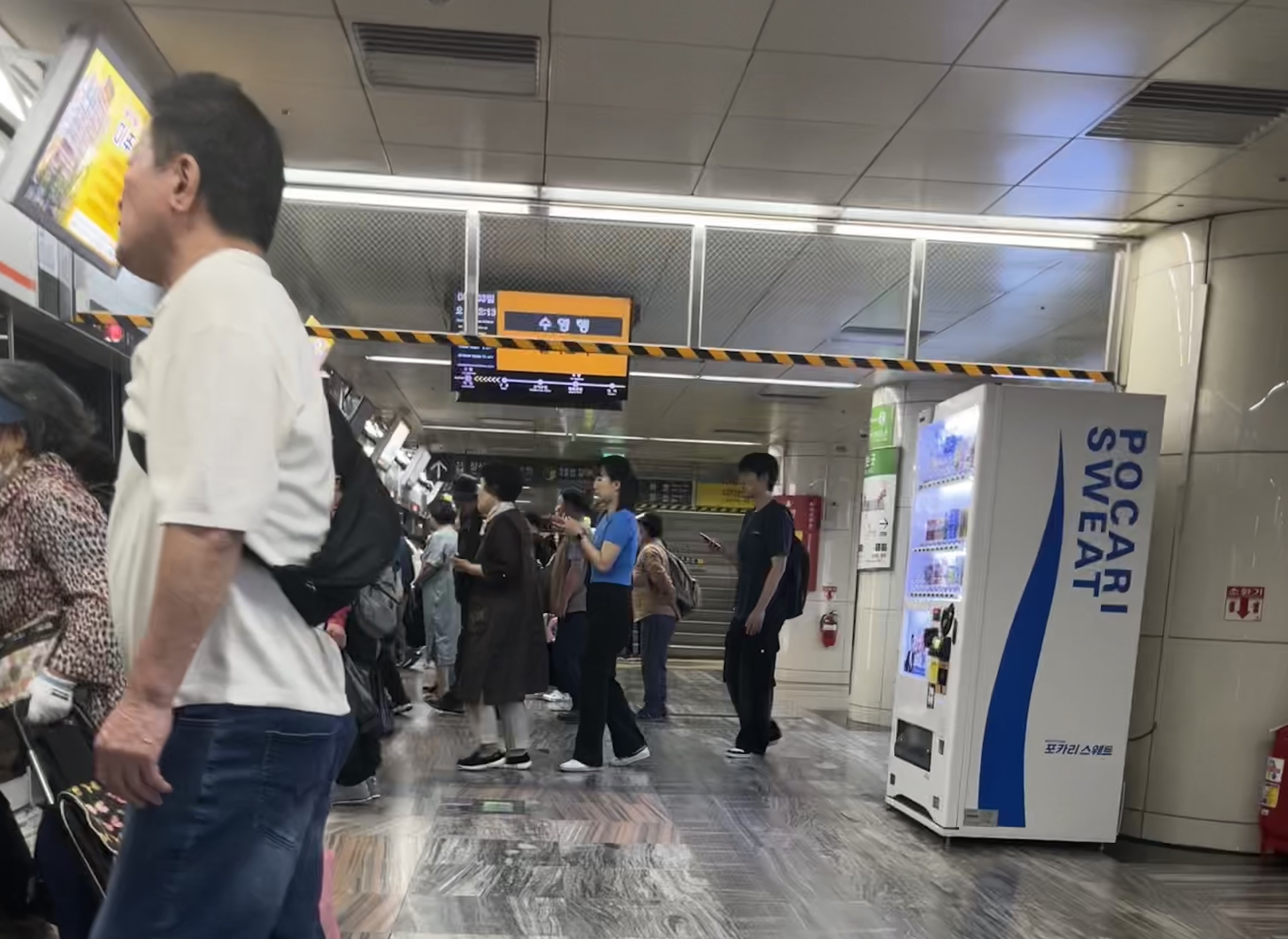
The interior of the station (Line 3)

== See also ==
- Busan Institute of Science and Technology
