= Cheongoksan (Jeongseon and Pyeongchang) =

Mountain in South Korea

Highest point
- Elevation: 1,255.7 m (4,120 ft)

Geography
- Location: South Korea

Korean name
- Hangul: 청옥산
- Hanja: 靑玉山
- RR: Cheongoksan
- MR: Ch'ŏngoksan

Cheongoksan (Korean: 청옥산) is a mountain in Gangwon Province, South Korea. Its base extends across the counties of Jeongseon and Pyeongchang. Cheongoksan has an elevation of 1,255.7 m (4,120 ft).

== See also ==
- List of mountains in Korea
