= Geumgok station (Busan Metro) =

Station of the Busan Metro

238 금곡 Geumgok
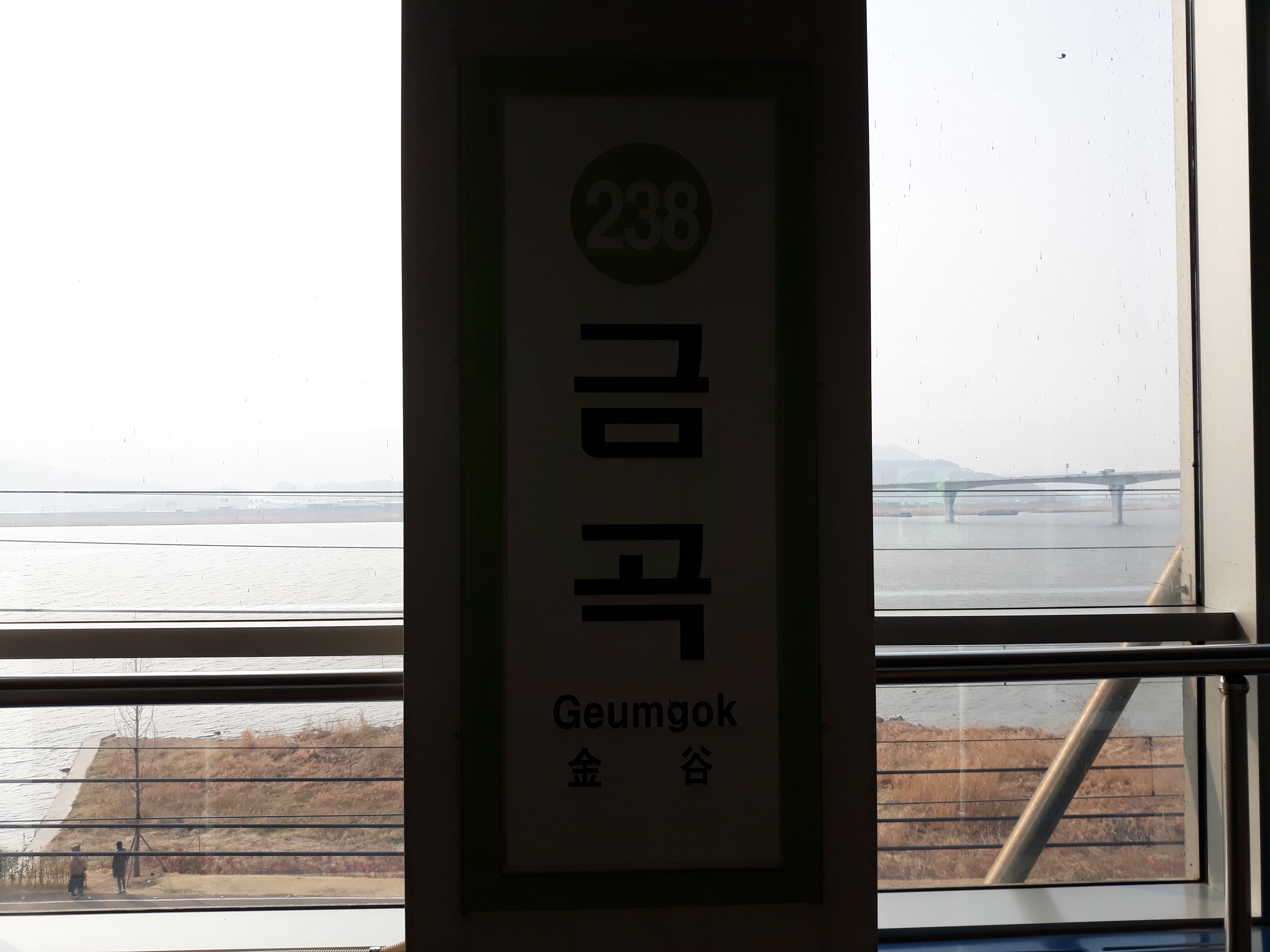

Korean name
- Hangul: 금곡역
- Hanja: 金谷驛
- Revised Romanization: Geumgok-yeok
- McCune–Reischauer: Kŭmgok-yŏk

General information
- Location: Geumgok-dong, Buk District, Busan; South Korea
- Coordinates: 35.2675°N 129.0169°E
- Operator: Busan Transportation Corporation
- Line: Busan Metro Line 2
- Platforms: 2
- Tracks: 2

Construction
- Structure type: Elevated

Other information
- Station code: 238

History
- Opened: June 30, 1999; 27 years ago
Location

Geumgok Station (Korean: 금곡역) is a station on the Busan Metro Line 2 in Geumgok-dong, Buk District, Busan, South Korea.

Preceding station	Busan Metro	Following station
Dongwon towards Jangsan	Line 2	Hopo towards Yangsan
