= Hwamyeong-dong =

- Hangul: 화명동
- Hanja: 華明洞
- RR: Hwamyeong-dong
- MR: Hwamyŏng-dong

Hwamyeong-dong (Korean: 화명동) is a region in Buk-gu, northern Busan, South Korea. It is situated along the east bank of the Nakdong River, and since 2003 has been divided into three dong, Hwamyeong 1, 2, and 3-dong. The total area of the three dong is approximately 12 km^{2} (5 sq mi). It was designed to serve as a commuter town for Busan, and was home to about 99,000 people as of February 2020.

== Name ==
There are many different theories regarding the origination of the name Hwamyeong. The most reliable theory is that Mt. Geumjeong, the mountain surrounding Hwamyeong, was once called Mt. Hwa, or Hwasan. This names derives from the mountain being described as an ideal or bright place, and since the Chinese letter for ideal is pronounced 'myeong' in Korean, the name Hwamyeong thus refers to an "ideal bright place." Another theory is that the district's original name was Hwe-Bulgi, which means 'bright sun' or 'red sun'. The literal translation of Hwamyeong, as it is currently spelled, is 'brightly shining,' and is derived from Chinese characters. This name was first attached to the region in 1914, during the period of Japanese rule. At that time, it was known as Hwamyeong-ri, a subdivision of Gupo-myeon. In 1963, it became a dong under the administration of Busanjin District. In 1978, it was transferred to Buk-gu, of which it remained a unitary part until its division in 2003.

== Transportation ==
Hwamyeong station lies on the Gyeongbu Line, and is served by several Mugunghwa-ho and Tonggeun trains daily.

There are two subway station in Hwamyeong-dong, which are named Hwamyeong station(Busan Metro) and Sujeong station(Busan Metro).

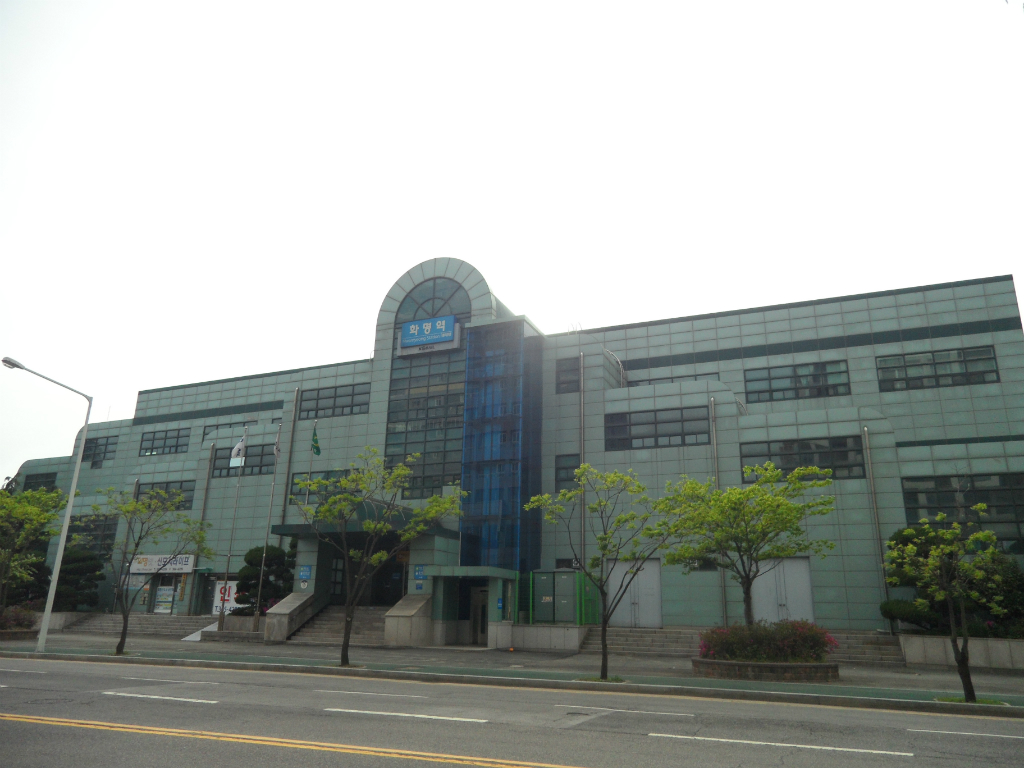
Train station

Hwamyeong is also served by Busan city bus lines 15, 59, 111, 111-1, 121, 126, 300, and 1009, Yangsan bus 21, 23, and 23-1, and Busan town shuttle (마을버스) Gyeumjung 1, Bookgu 3, Bookgu 7, and Bookgu 7-2.

== Tourism ==
Hwamyeong Ecological Park is located near Hwamyeong Station and next to the Nakdong River. It has walking trails, baseball fields, soccer pitches, tennis courts, basketball courts, an in-line skating rink, and many other amenities for the public to enjoy. It also features a cycling path that is part of Korea's cross-country cycle trail. At the southern end of the park, there is natural lotus habitat along with an adjacent aqua sports center and outdoor pool, which is open to the public during the Summer.

Hwamyeong Arboretum can be found along the banks of the Daecheon stream, which traverses Hwamyeong-dong. It has over 200,000 varieties of plants for visitors to observe, and is conveniently located adjacent to the Geumjeongsan hiking trail network. Visitors can look up where certain plants are located using the electronic plant dictionary provided on the website.
The Busan Fishing Village Folk Museum is located right in front of Hwamyeong station. It presents exhibitions detailing the fishing activity of Busan folk villages through the ages, traditional fishing technologies, historic sites, and folklore. The museum also has experiential learning programs for children to help them to understand life before Hwamyeong's rapid development and modernization.

The Hwamyeong Rose Park is right next to the Busan Fishing Village Folk Museum. It is a botanical park divided into 49 sections containing different rose species, and is especially popular during May and June, when the roses are in bloom. A basketball court, a football field, and a multipurpose sports field can also be found within the park.

== School ==
- Hwamyeong highschool
- Korea Communications University
- Myungjin Elementary School
- Yongsu Elementary School
- Geumgok High school
- Geummyeng Middle school
