= Cheongoksan (Donghae and Samcheok) =

Mountain in Gangwon Province, South Korea

Coordinates: 37°15′36″N 129°09′54″E

Highest point
- Elevation: 1,403.7 m (4,605 ft)

Geography
- Location: South Korea

Korean name
- Hangul: 청옥산
- Hanja: 靑玉山
- RR: Cheongoksan
- MR: Ch'ŏngoksan

Cheongoksan (Korean: 청옥산) is a mountain in Gangwon Province, South Korea. It is located on the border of the cities of Donghae and Samcheok. Cheongoksan has an elevation of 1,403.7 m (4,605 ft). Other nearby mountains are Gojeokdae (高積臺, 1,354 m) to the north, Jungbongsan (中峰山, 1,284 m) to the northwest, and Dutasan (頭陀山, 1,353 m) to the southeast.

== See also ==
- List of mountains in Korea
