= Mandeok-dong, Busan =

Mandeok-dong
- Country: South Korea

Area
  - Total: 8.77 km^{2} (3.39 sq mi)

Population (2011)
  - Total: 61,826
  - Density: 7,050/km^{2} (18,300/sq mi)

Korean name
- Hangul: 만덕동
- Hanja: 萬德洞
- RR: Mandeok-dong
- MR: Mandŏk-tong

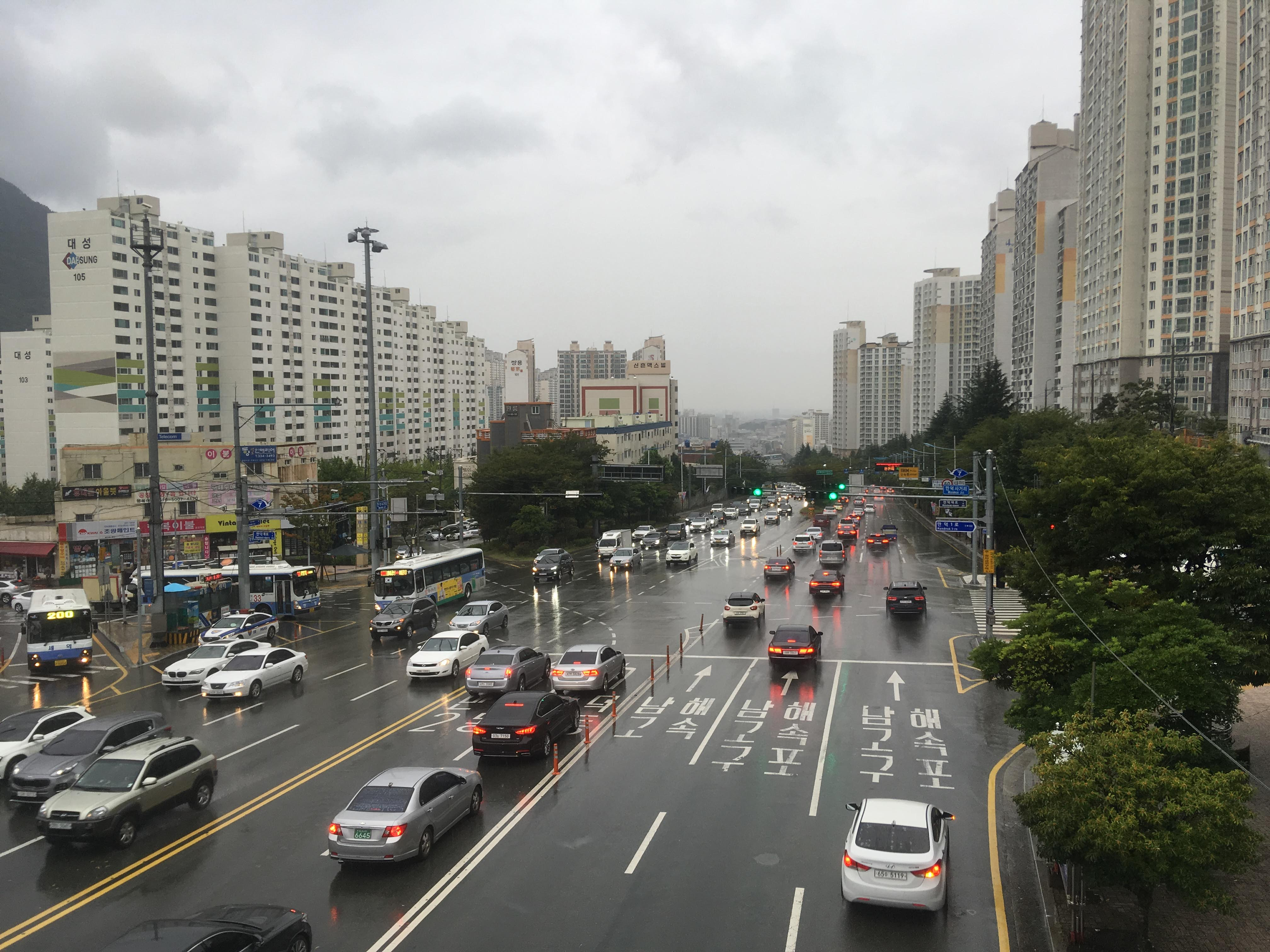
Mandeok-dong in Busan.

Mandeok-dong (Korean: 만덕동) is a neighborhood in Buk-gu, southern Busan, South Korea, which is further divided into three dong, Mandeok-1-dong, Mandeok-2-dong and Mandeok-3-dong.

== Transportation ==
- Mandeok Station of

== Tourist attraction ==
- Mandeoksa Temple Site

== See also ==
- Administrative divisions of South Korea
