= Cheongoksan (North Gyeongsang) =

Mountain in Bonghwa, South Korea

Highest point
- Elevation: 1,276.5 m (4,188 ft)

Geography
- Location: South Korea

Korean name
- Hangul: 청옥산
- Hanja: 靑玉山
- RR: Cheongoksan
- MR: Ch'ŏngoksan

Cheongoksan (Korean: 청옥산) is a mountain in Bonghwa County, North Gyeongsang Province in South Korea. It has an elevation of 1,276.5 m (4,188 ft).

== See also ==
- List of mountains in Korea
