= Buk District, Busan =

District of Busan, South Korea

Coordinates: 35.2°N 128.99°E

- Autonomous District
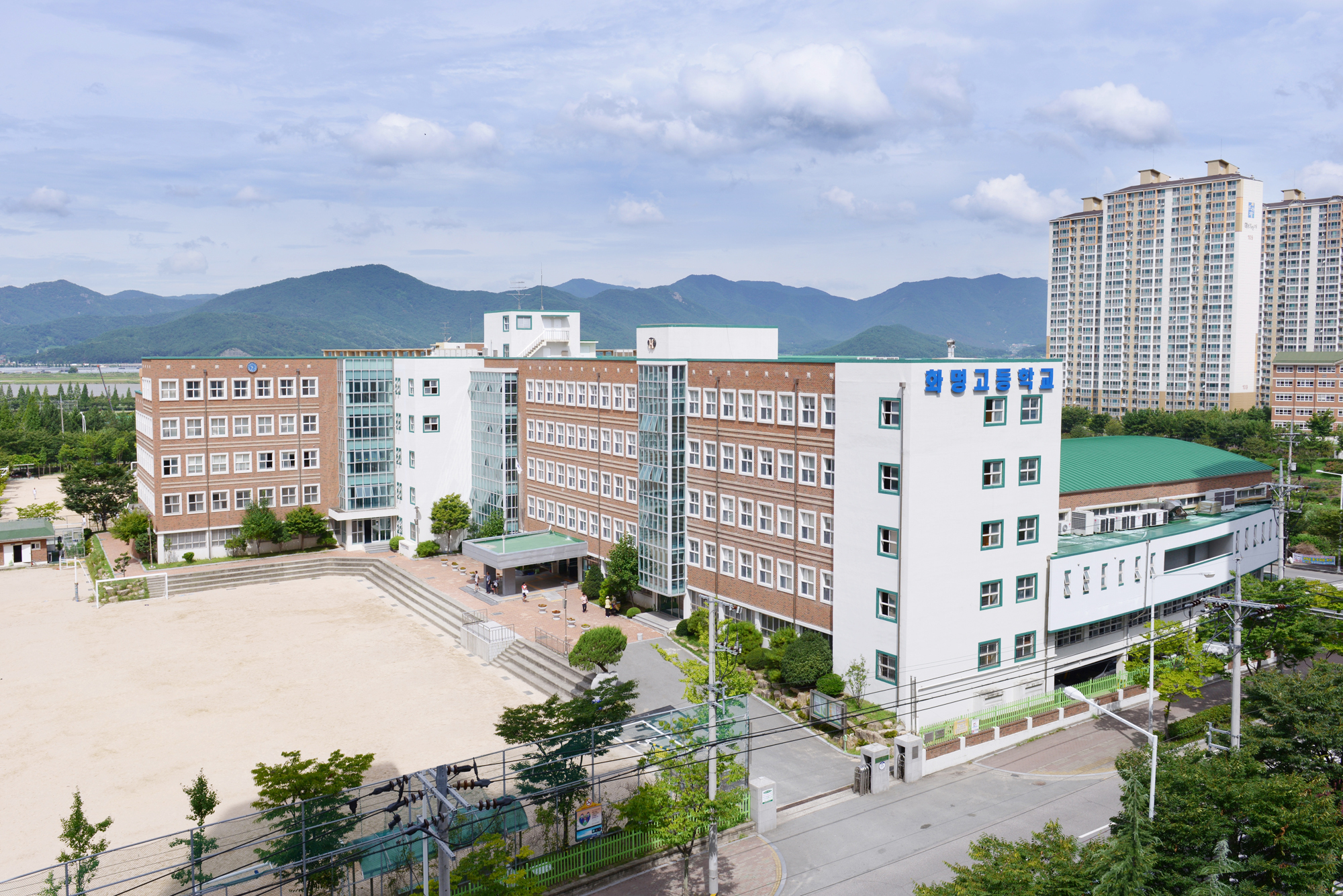
- Hwamyeong High School and surrounding apartments

- Flag

- Location of Buk District in Busan
- Country: South Korea
- Region: Yeongnam
- Provincial level: Busan
- Administrative divisions: 13 administrative dong

Government
  - Mayor: Jeong Myeong-hee (정명희)

Area
  - Total: 39.37 km^{2} (15.20 sq mi)

Population (2023)
  - Total: 275,773
  - Density: 7,004.65/km^{2} (18,142.0/sq mi)
  - Dialect: Gyeongsang
- Website: Buk District Office

Korean name
- Hangul: 북구
- Hanja: 北區
- RR: Buk-gu
- MR: Puk-ku

Daedong-Hwamyeong Bridge

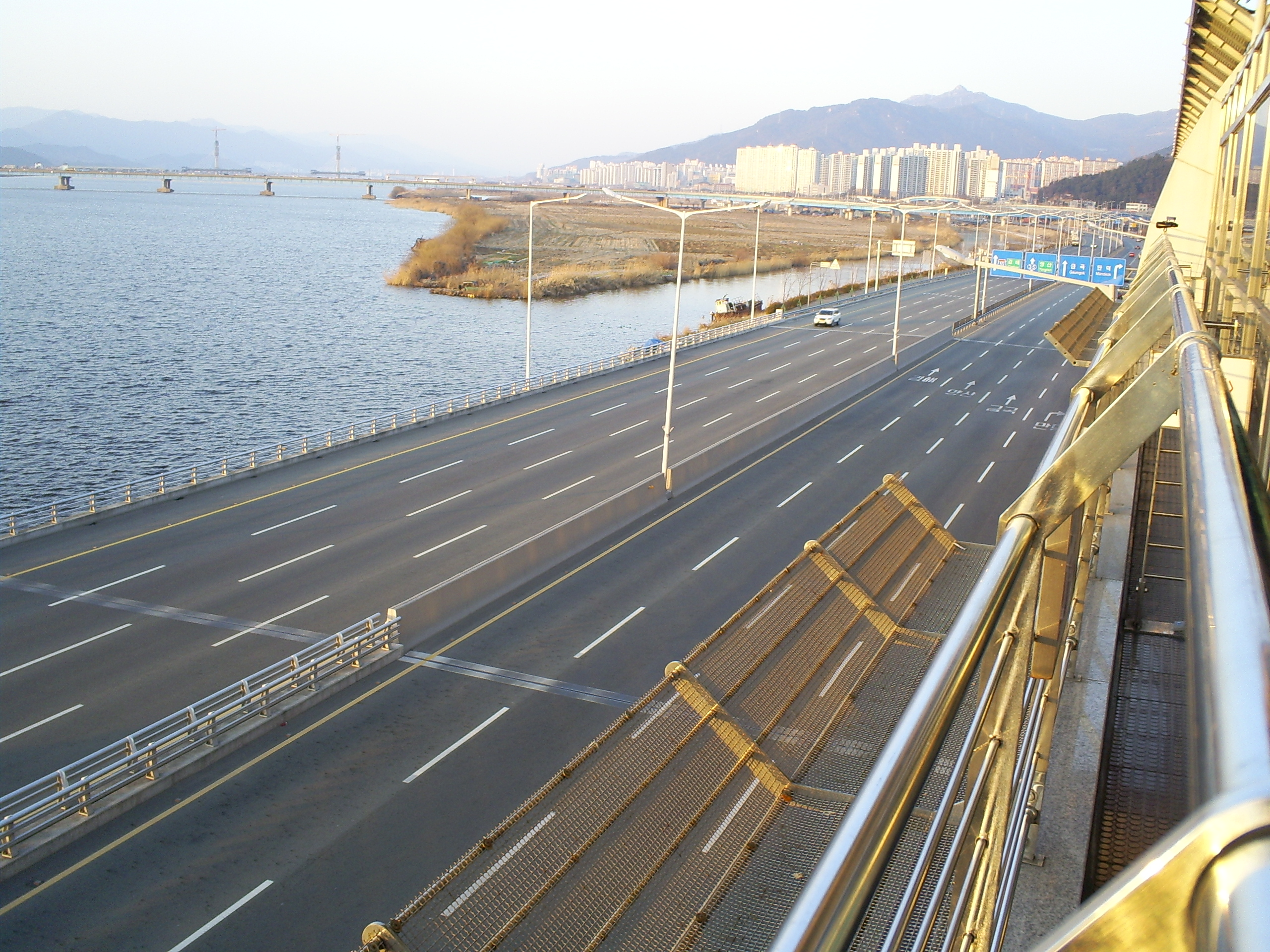
Gangbyeon Expressway

Buk District (Korean: 북구; lit. 'North District') is a gu (district) in north-central Busan, South Korea. The district is 39.37 square kilometers with a population of 275,773 as of 2023. It was established as a gu in 1978.

== Administrative divisions ==
Administrative divisions

Buk District is divided into 5 legal dong and further subdivided into 13 administrative dong as follows:

- Gupo-dong (3 administrative dong)
- Geumgok-dong
- Hwamyeong-dong (3 administrative dong)
- Deckcheon-dong (3 administrative dong)
- Mandeok-dong (3 administrative dong)

== Sister cities ==
- Jiaozhou, China

== Notable people ==
- Han Seung-woo: singer-songwriter, rapper, dancer, member of Victon
- Jungkook: singer-songwriter, member of BTS

== See also ==
- Geography of South Korea
- Subdivisions of South Korea
