= Gaya Station =

Gaya Station may refer to:

- Gaya station (Korail), Korea, on the Gaya Line
- Gaya station (Busan Metro)Korea
