= Seomyeon Medical Street =

Medical district in Busan, South Korea

Coordinates: 35.1578317°N 129.0543992°E

Seomyeon Medical Street (Korean: 서면메디컬스트리트) refers to a medical district in Busanjin-gu, Busan named after and centered on the thoroughfare within a 1 kilometre (0.62 mi) radius of the Seomyeon Lotte Department Store and Buam Station. It is one of three medical districts being devised by the Government of Busan and is the most concentrated in all of South Korea.

== Background ==
Located in Seomyeon near the Judies Taehwa shopping mall, Seomyeon Medical Street is home to a total of 160 cosmetic and other medical clinics, including those specializing in cosmetic surgery, dermatology, ophthalmology and dentistry. The Street area also provides a wide range of amenities and entertainment venues, including five-star hotel, large department store, large discount store, duty-free shop, casino, restaurants, beauty salon and clothing outlets.

== Medical tourism ==
The district's popularity amongst medical tourists from Russia, China, Japan and the United States has seen an influx in recent history. This has prompted city officials to invest ₩3,000,000,000 into the area, as well as found an information center and provide access to tour guides fluent in Chinese, English and Japanese.

== See also ==
- Seomyeon Station
- Harley Street
