= Gaegeum station =

Station of the Busan Metro

223 개금 (인제대학교 부산백병원) Gaegeum (Inje Univ. Busan Paik Hospital)
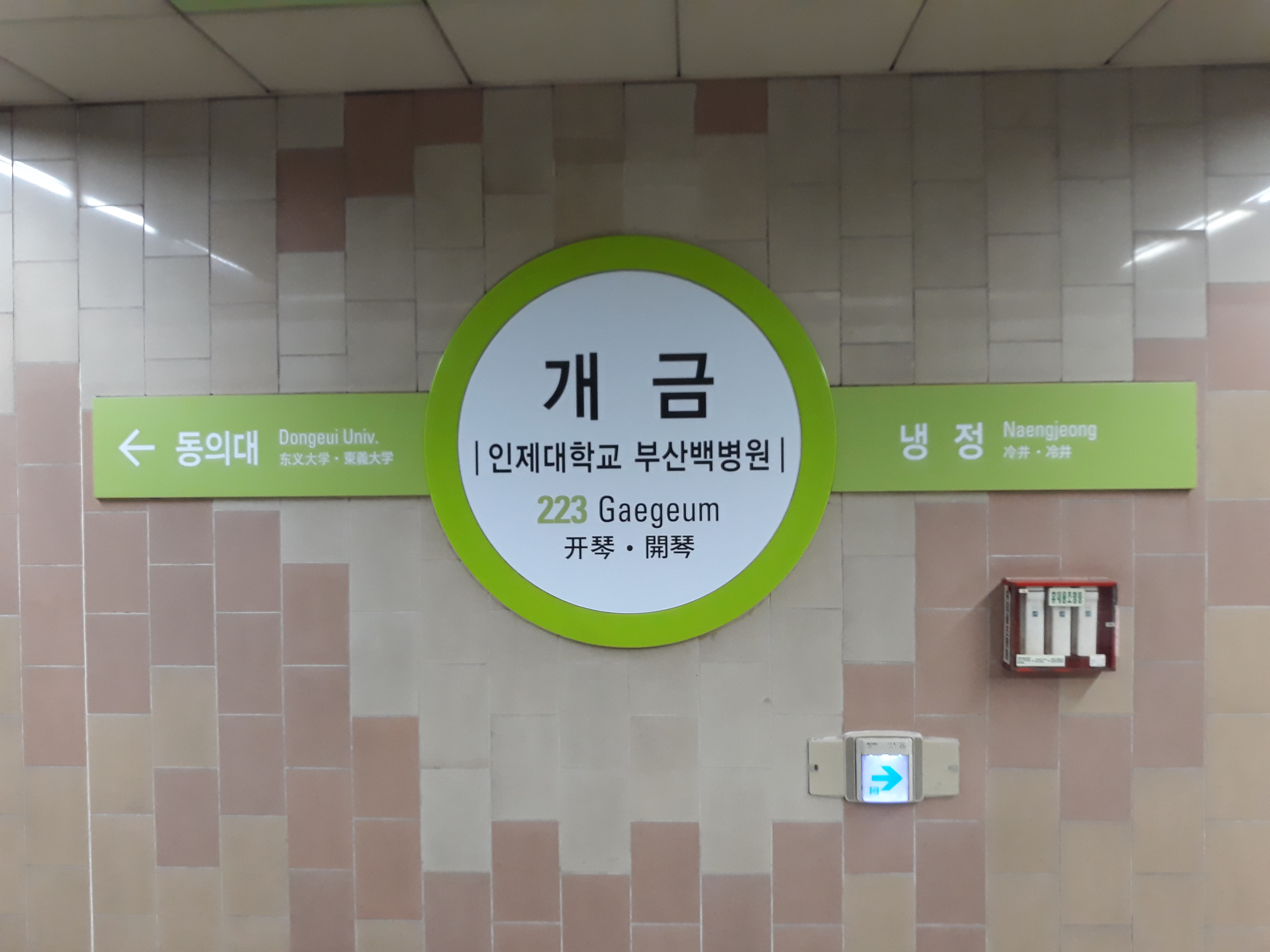

Korean name
- Hangul: 개금역
- Hanja: 開琴驛
- Revised Romanization: Gaegum-yeok
- McCune–Reischauer: Kaekŭm-yŏk

General information
- Location: Gaegeum-dong, Busanjin District, Busan; South Korea
- Coordinates: 35.1533°N 129.0205°E
- Operator: Busan Transportation Corporation
- Line: Busan Metro Line 2
- Platforms: 2
- Tracks: 2

Construction
- Structure type: Underground

Other information
- Station code: 223

History
- Opened: June 30, 1999; 27 years ago
Location

Gaegeum Station (Korean: 개금역) is a station on the Busan Metro Line 2 in Gaegeum-dong, Busanjin District, Busan, South Korea.

Preceding station	Busan Metro	Following station
Dongeui University towards Jangsan	Line 2	Naengjeong towards Yangsan
