= Dongeui University station =

Station of the Busan Metro

222 동의대 Dongeui Univ.
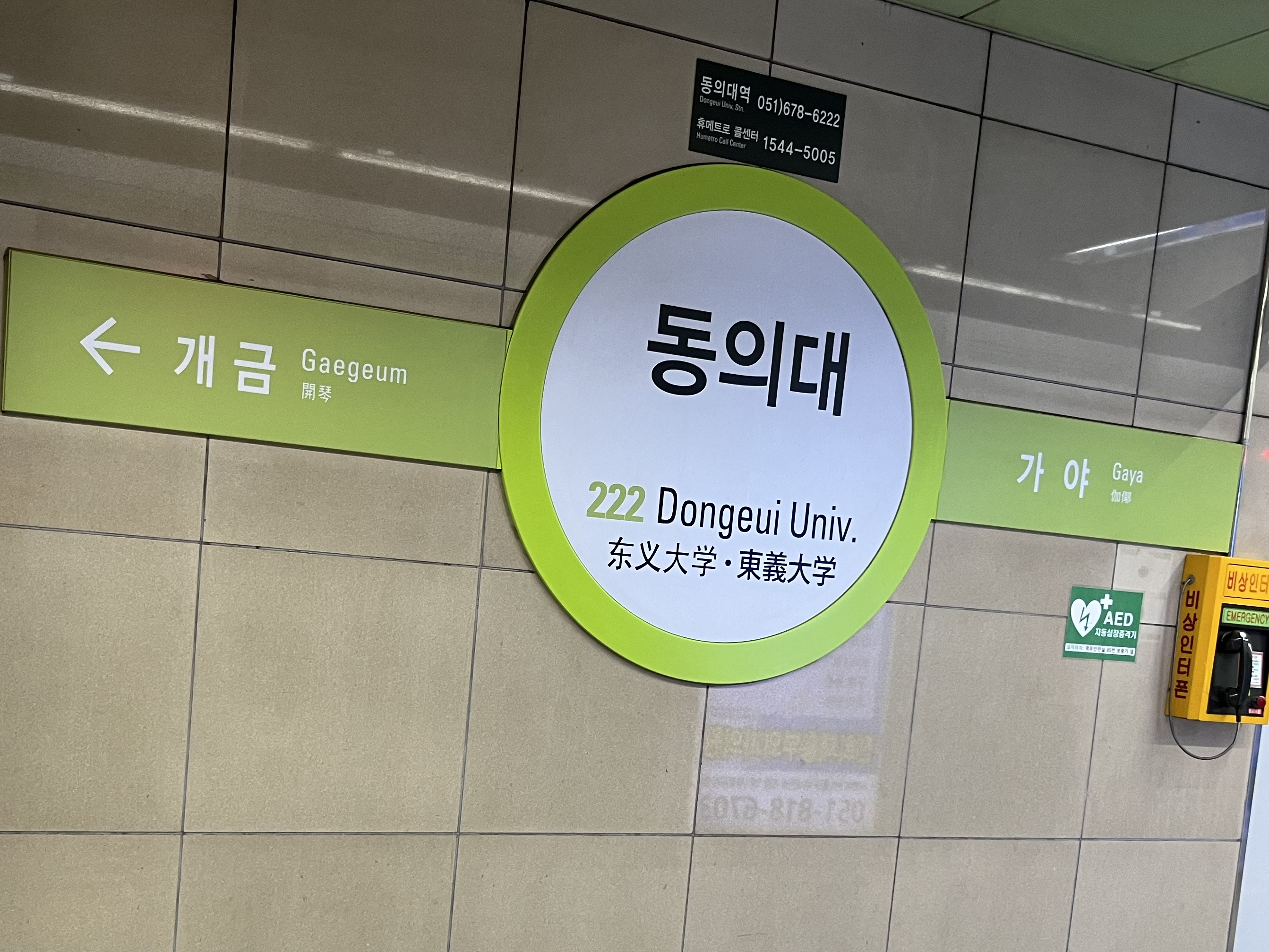

Korean name
- Hangul: 동의대역
- Hanja: 東義大驛
- Revised Romanization: Donguidae-yeok
- McCune–Reischauer: Tongŭitae-yŏk

General information
- Location: Gaya-dong, Busanjin District, Busan; South Korea
- Coordinates: 35.1540°N 129.0321°E
- Operator: Busan Transportation Corporation
- Line: Busan Metro Line 2
- Platforms: 2
- Tracks: 2

Construction
- Structure type: Underground

Other information
- Station code: 222

History
- Opened: June 30, 1999; 27 years ago
Location

Dongeui University Station (Korean: 동의대역) is a station on the Busan Metro Line 2 in Gaya-dong, Busanjin District, Busan, South Korea.

Preceding station	Busan Metro	Following station
Gaya towards Jangsan	Line 2	Gaegeum towards Yangsan
