= Naengjeong station =

Station of the Busan Metro

224 냉정 Naengjeong
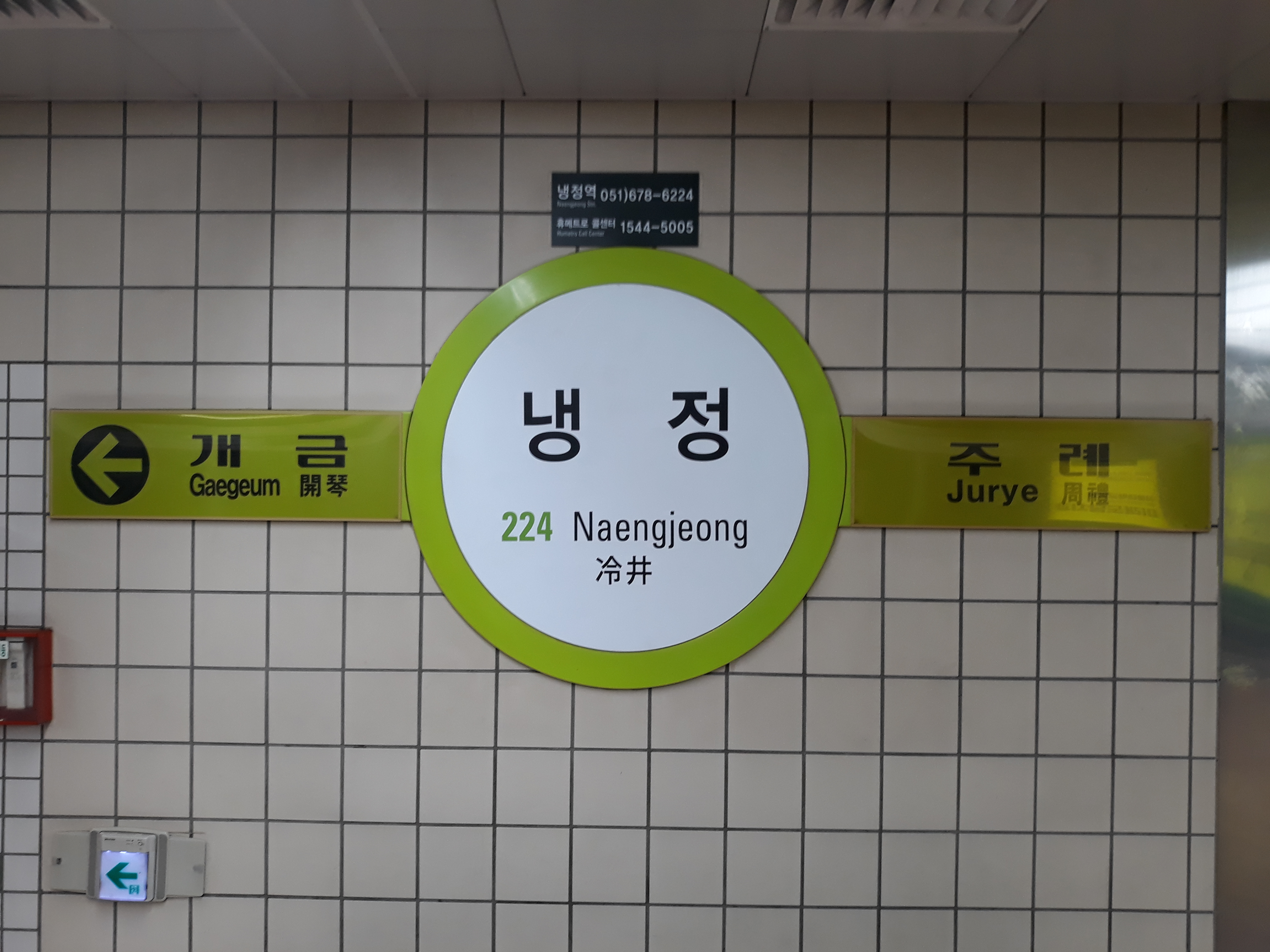

Korean name
- Hangul: 냉정역
- Hanja: 冷井驛
- Revised Romanization: Naengjeong yeok
- McCune–Reischauer: Naengchŏk yŏk

General information
- Location: Jurye-dong, Sasang District, Busan; South Korea
- Coordinates: 35.1513°N 129.0124°E
- Operator: Busan Transportation Corporation
- Line: Busan Metro Line 2
- Platforms: 2
- Tracks: 2

Construction
- Structure type: Underground

Other information
- Station code: 224

History
- Opened: June 30, 1999; 27 years ago
Location

Naengjeong Station (Korean: 냉정역; Hanja: 開琴驛) is a station on the Busan Metro Line 2 in Jurye-dong, Sasang District, Busan, South Korea.

Preceding station	Busan Metro	Following station
Gaegeum towards Jangsan	Line 2	Jurye towards Yangsan
