= Gaya station (Busan Metro) =

Station of the Busan Metro

221 가야 Gaya
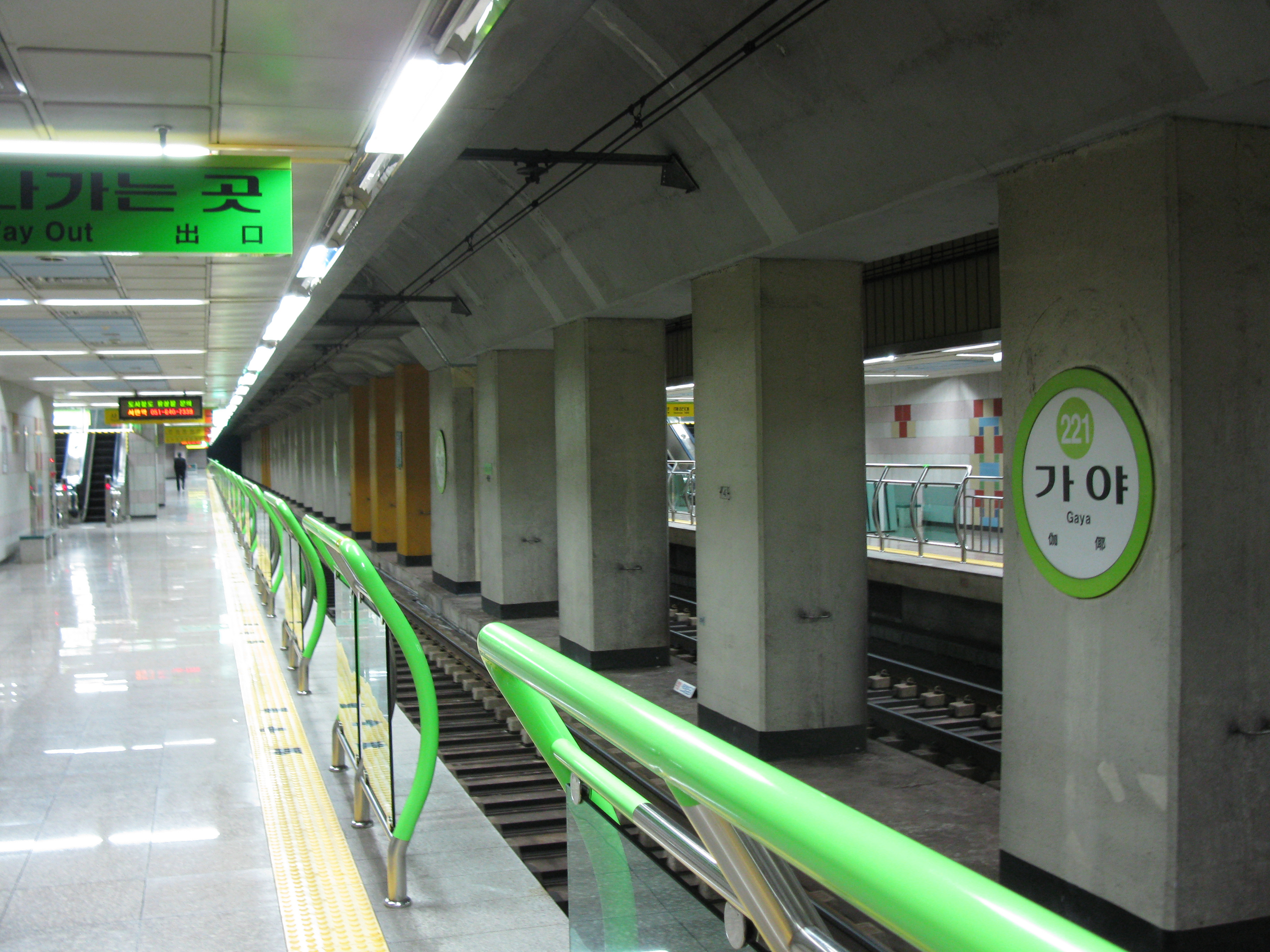

Korean name
- Hangul: 가야역
- Hanja: 伽倻驛
- Revised Romanization: Gaya-yeok
- McCune–Reischauer: Kaya-yŏk

General information
- Location: Gaya-dong, Busanjin District, Busan; South Korea
- Coordinates: 35.1559°N 129.0428°E
- Operator: Busan Transportation Corporation
- Line: Busan Metro Line 2
- Platforms: 2
- Tracks: 2

Construction
- Structure type: Underground

Other information
- Station code: 221

History
- Opened: June 30, 1999; 27 years ago
Location

Gaya Station (Korean: 가야역) is a station on the Busan Metro Line 2 in Gaya-dong, Busanjin District, Busan, South Korea. The station is unrelated to the Gaya Station which used to be operated by Korail.

Preceding station	Busan Metro	Following station
Buam towards Jangsan	Line 2	Dongeui University towards Yangsan
