= Buam station =

Station of the Busan Metro

220 부암 (온 종합병원) Buam (On General Hospital)
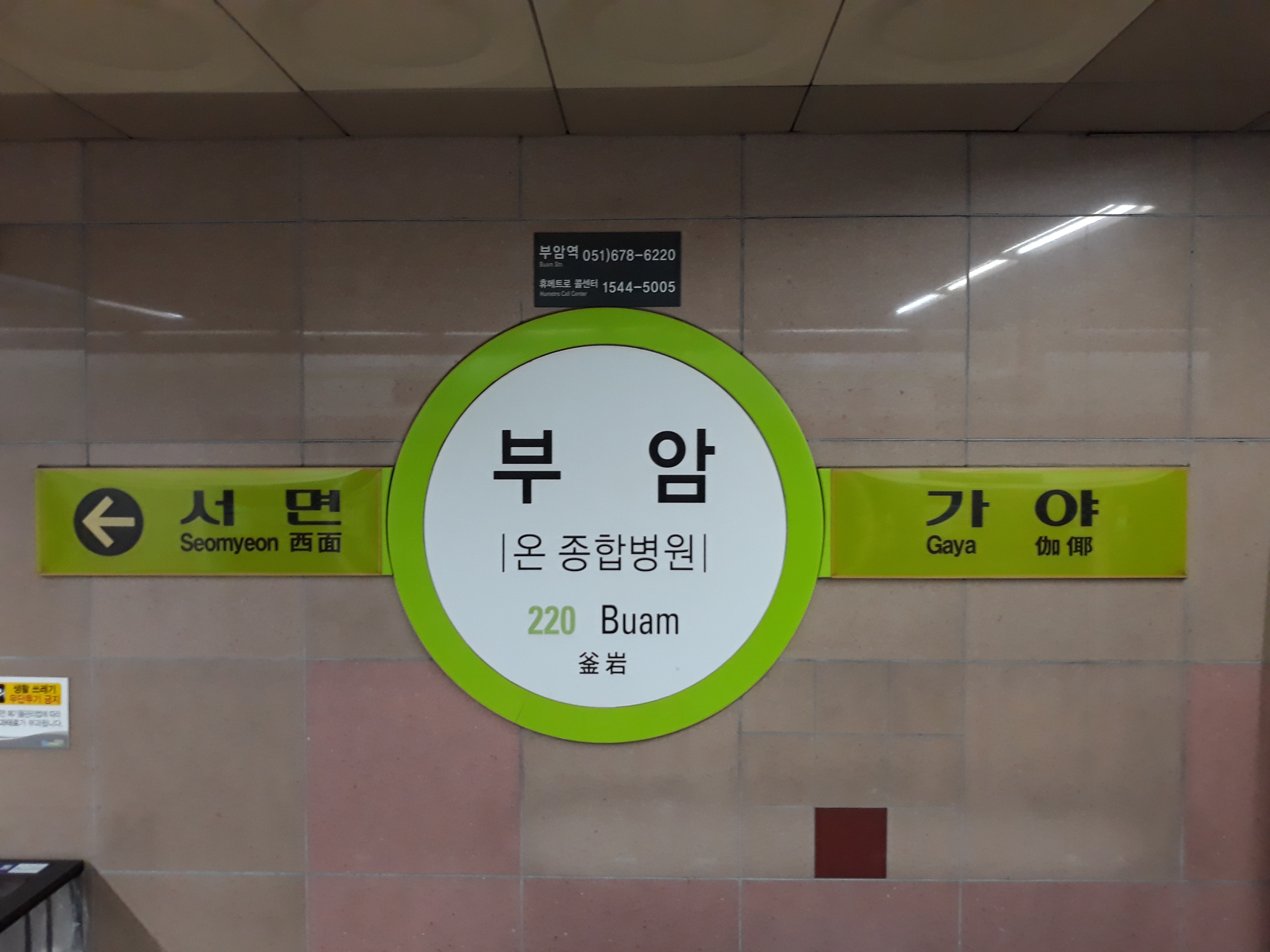

Korean name
- Hangul: 부암역
- Hanja: 釜岩驛
- Revised Romanization: Buam-yeok
- McCune–Reischauer: Puam-yŏk

General information
- Location: Beomcheon-dong, Busanjin District, Busan; South Korea
- Coordinates: 35.1574°N 129.0505°E
- Operator: Busan Transportation Corporation
- Line: Busan Metro Line 2
- Platforms: 2
- Tracks: 2

Construction
- Structure type: Underground

Other information
- Station code: 220

History
- Opened: June 30, 1999; 27 years ago
Location

Buam Station (Korean: 부암역; Hanja: 釜岩驛) is a station on the Busan Metro Line 2 in Beomcheon-dong, Busanjin District, Busan, South Korea.

Preceding station	Busan Metro	Following station
Seomyeon towards Jangsan	Line 2	Gaya towards Yangsan
