= Nampo (disambiguation) =

Nampo, or Namp'o is a city in North Korea.

Nampo or Nanpo may also refer to:

== Korea ==
- Nampo-dong, Chongjin, Songpyong-guyok, Chongjin, North Hamgyong Province, North Korea
- Nampo-dong, Busan, Jung District, Busan in South Korea
  - Nampo Station (Busan)

== Japan ==
- Ōta Nanpo or Ōta Nampo (1749–1823), Japanese poet and fiction writer
- Nanpō Islands, south of Tokyo
- Southern Expeditionary Army Group (Nanpō gun)

== China ==
- Nanpo, a township in Jingxi, Guangxi, China

== See also ==
- Nampo Station (disambiguation)
- Nanpu (disambiguation)
