= Jagalchi station =

Station of the Busan Metro

110 자갈치 Jagalchi
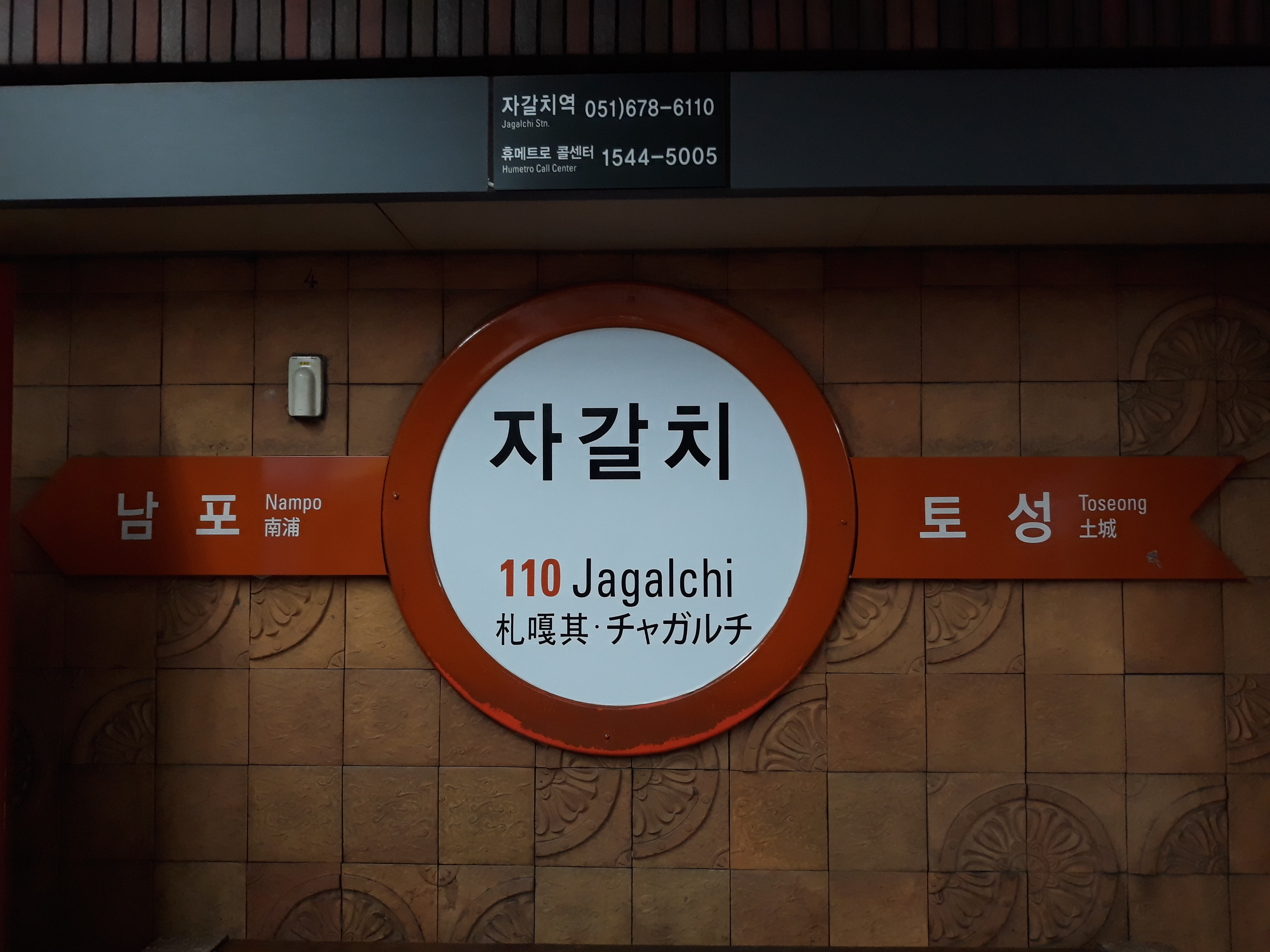

Korean name
- Hangul: 자갈치역
- Hanja: 자갈치驛
- Revised Romanization: Jagalchi yeok
- McCune–Reischauer: Chagalch'i yŏk

General information
- Location: Nampo-dong, Jung District, Busan; South Korea
- Coordinates: 35°05′51″N 129°01′37″E
- Operator: Busan Transportation Corporation
- Line: Busan Metro Line 1
- Platforms: 2
- Tracks: 2

Construction
- Structure type: Underground

Other information
- Station code: 110

History
- Opened: May 19, 1988; 38 years ago

Services
Preceding station	Busan Metro	Following station
Toseong towards Dadaepo Beach	Line 1	Nampo towards Nopo
Location

Jagalchi Station (Korean: 자갈치역) is a station of the Busan Metro Line 1 in Nampo-dong, Jung District, Busan, South Korea.

It opened on May 19, 1988 with the opening of Busan Metro Line 1.

The station serves three markets, the famous Gukje Market, Jagalchi Fish Market, and the only night market in Busan, Bupyeong Kkangtong Market.
