= Beomil Station =

Beomil Station (Korean: 범일역; Hanja: 凡一驛) is a railroad stations in Busan, South Korea.

- Beomil station (Korail)
- Beomil station (Busan Metro)
