= Choryang station =

Station of the Busan Metro

114 초량 Choryang
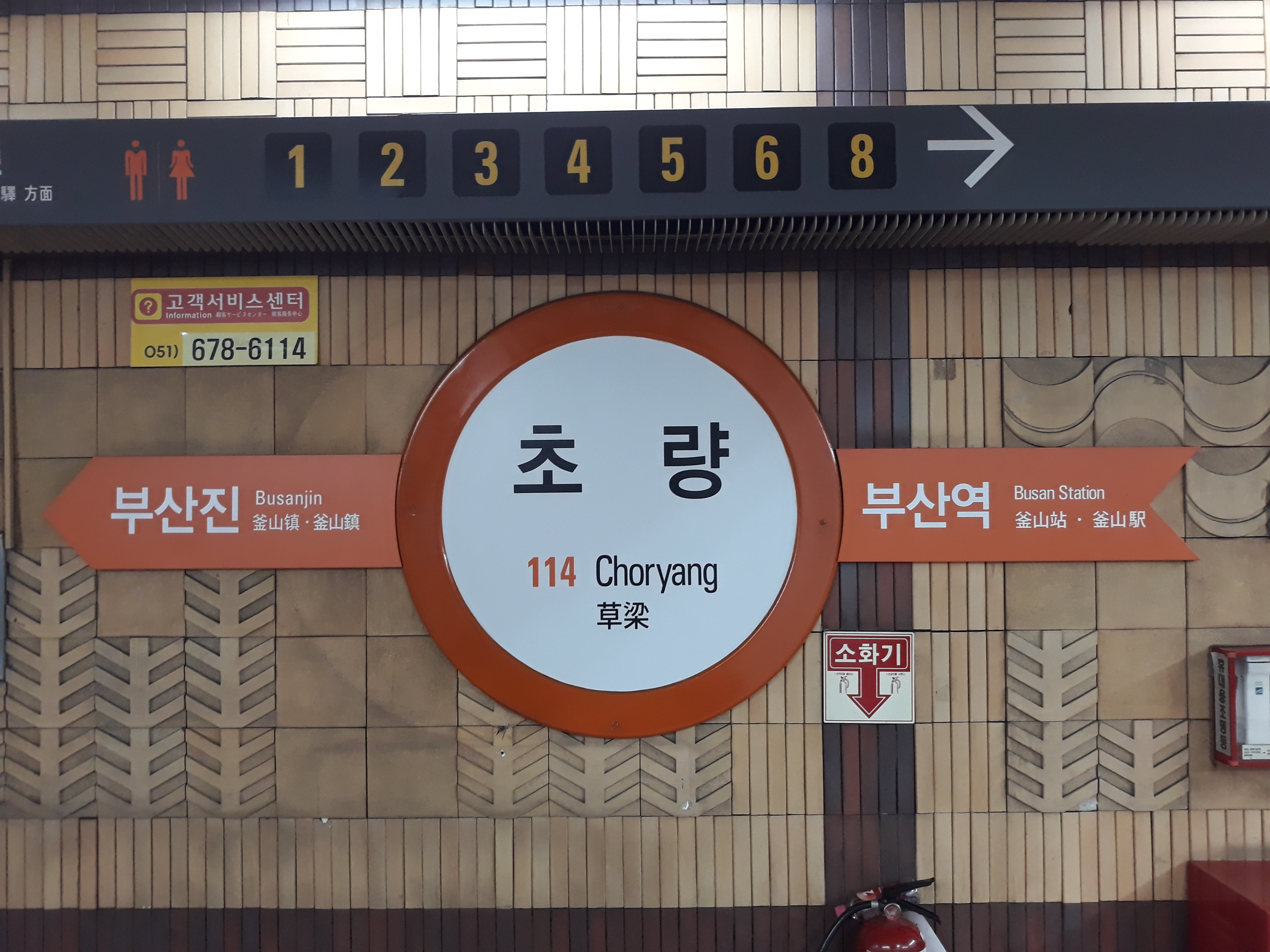

Korean name
- Hangul: 초량역
- Hanja: 草梁驛
- Revised Romanization: Choryang-yeok
- McCune–Reischauer: Ch'oryang-yŏk

General information
- Location: Choryang-dong, Dong District, Busan; South Korea
- Coordinates: 35°7′16.01″N 129°2′34.65″E
- Operator: Busan Transportation Corporation
- Line: Busan Metro Line 1
- Platforms: 2
- Tracks: 2

Construction
- Structure type: Underground

Other information
- Station code: 114

History
- Opened: May 15, 1987; 39 years ago

Services
Preceding station	Busan Metro	Following station
Busan Station towards Dadaepo Beach	Line 1	Busanjin towards Nopo
Location

Choryang Station (Korean: 초량역; Hanja: 草梁驛) is a station of the Busan Metro Line 1 in Choryang-dong, Dong District, Busan, South Korea.
