= Jwacheon station (Busan Metro) =

Station of the Busan Metro

116 좌천 Jwacheon
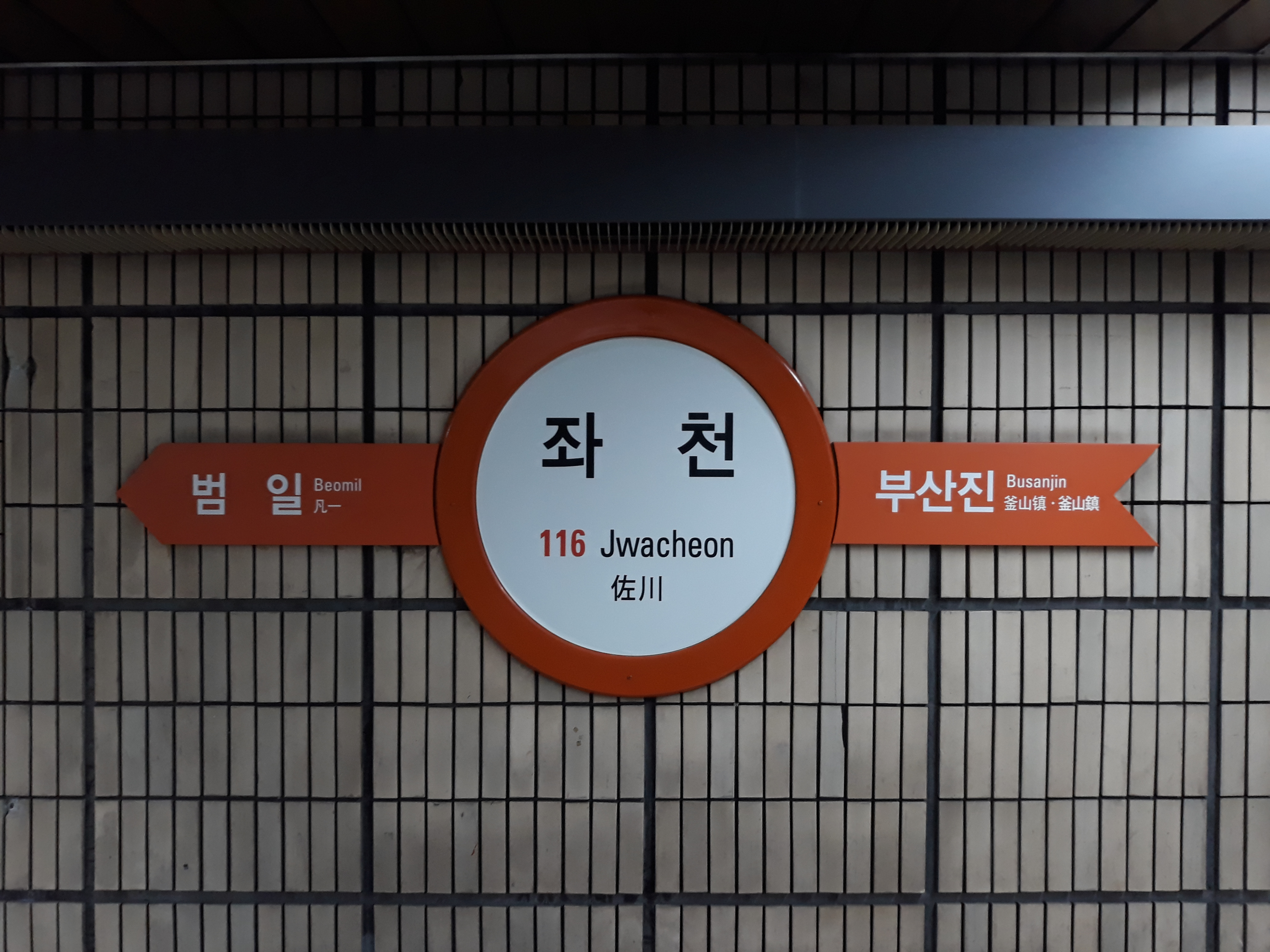

Korean name
- Hangul: 좌천역
- Hanja: 佐川驛
- Revised Romanization: Jwacheon yeok
- McCune–Reischauer: Chwach'ŏn yŏk

General information
- Location: Jwacheon-dong, Dong District, Busan; South Korea
- Coordinates: 35°08′03″N 129°03′15″E
- Operator: Busan Transportation Corporation
- Line: Busan Metro Line 1
- Platforms: 2
- Tracks: 2

Construction
- Structure type: Underground

Other information
- Station code: 116

History
- Opened: May 15, 1987; 39 years ago

Services
Preceding station	Busan Metro	Following station
Busanjin towards Dadaepo Beach	Line 1	Beomil towards Nopo
Location

Jwacheon Station (Korean: 좌천역; Hanja: 佐川驛) is a station of Busan Metro Line 1 in Jwacheon-dong, Dong District, Busan, South Korea. The station is unrelated to the Jwacheon Station of Korail.
