= Nampo-dong =

Neighborhood of Busan, South Korea

Coordinates: 35.09445°N 129.02944°E

- Hangul: 남포동
- Hanja: 南浦洞
- RR: Nampo-dong
- MR: Namp'o-dong

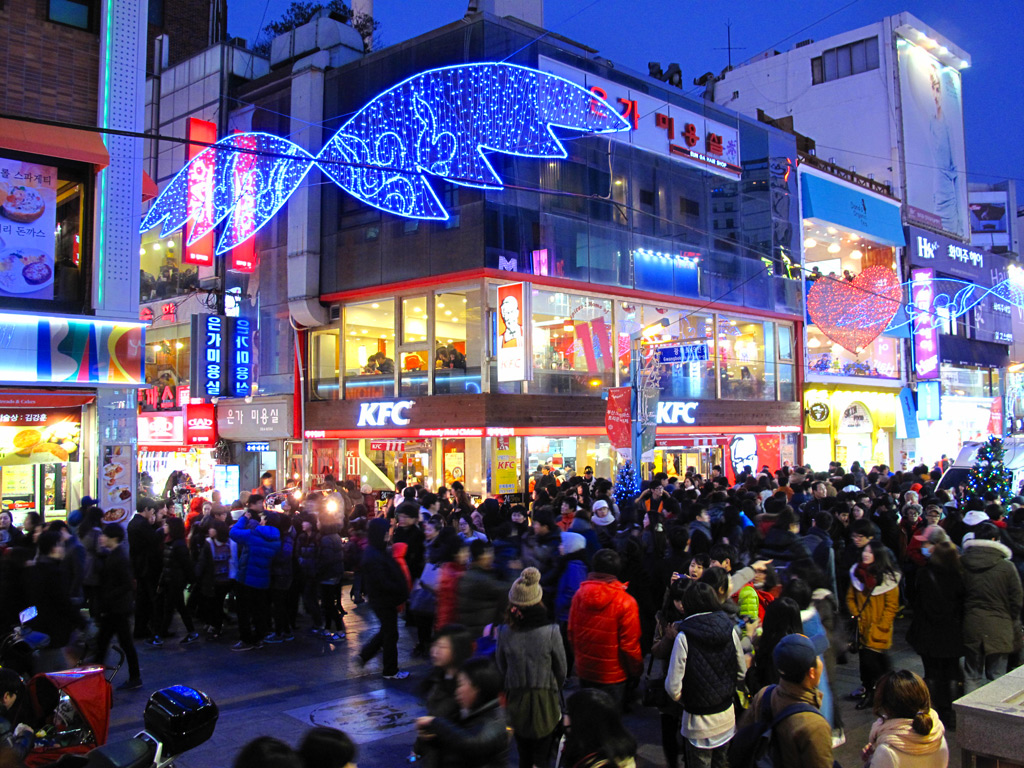
Nampo-Dong Christmas Lights

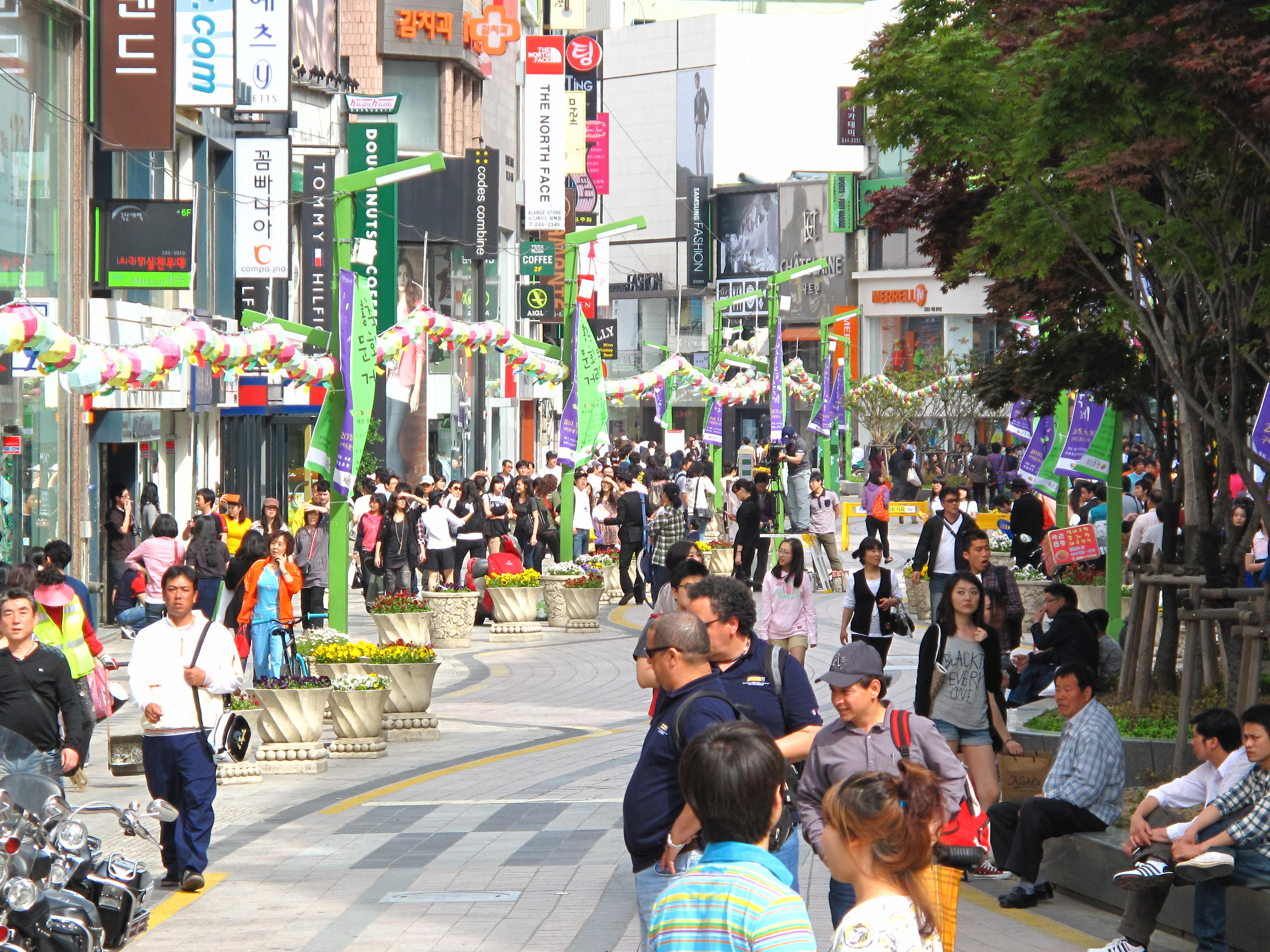
Main street in Nampo-dong

Nampo-dong (Korean: 남포동) is a central commercial and shopping area in Busan, South Korea. Nampo-dong is in Jung District in the southern center of the city, bordering the sea on the north side. Served by two bridges connecting Yeongdo District to the south, Nampo-dong is also accessible by Nampo Station subway. The area mainly consists of a long north-to-south street with a large walking area with shops, cafes, restaurants, and statues or other seasonal or permanent exhibits. Side streets also have numerous camera shops, and heading south the streets turn into Kangtong Market ("Tin-can Market") and Gukje Market, with foreign goods and street food, as well as Jagalchi Market, with fresh seafood for sale or dining as the streets approach the harbor. On the north end of Nampo-dong is the new Lotte Department Store. On the west side a narrow elevator leads up to Yongdusan Park with its tower. Nampo Station also has an extensive series of underground shops.

Nampo-dong tends to attract a cosmopolitan crowd of Japanese tourists, Russians, and westerners. As the area has restricted car access and is in a choke-point between the two halves of the city and Yeongdo Island to the south, parking is a continuing difficulty, though the area is easily walkable and reachable by bus or subway.
