= Beomnaegol station =

Station of the Busan Metro

118 범내골 (이샘병원) Beomnaegol (Esaem Hospital)
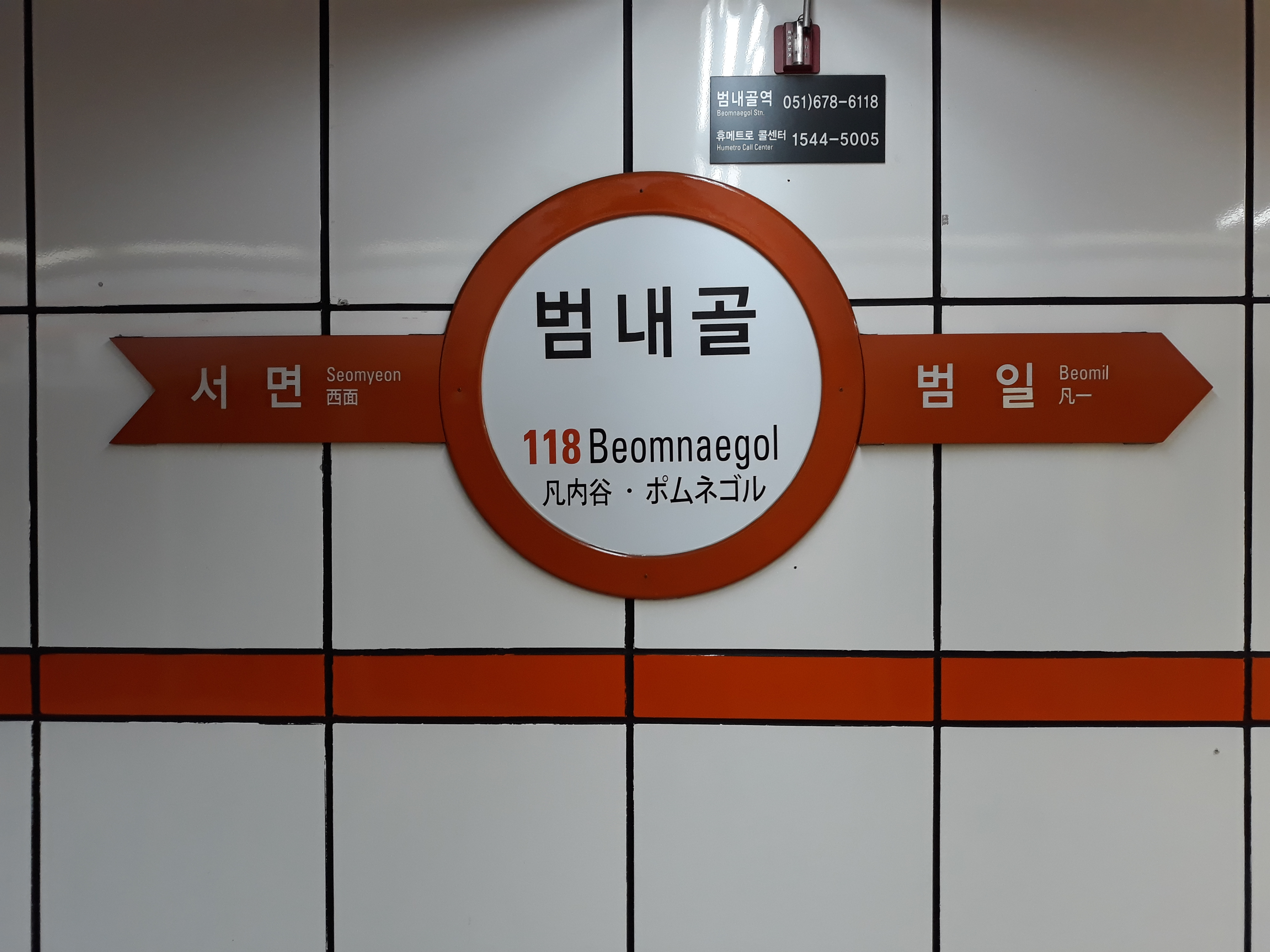

Korean name
- Hangul: 범내골역
- Hanja: 범내골驛
- Revised Romanization: Beomnaegol-yeok
- McCune–Reischauer: Pŏmnaekol-yŏk

General information
- Location: Beomcheon-dong, Busanjin District, Busan; South Korea
- Coordinates: 35°08′50″N 129°03′33″E
- Operator: Busan Transportation Corporation
- Line: Busan Metro Line 1
- Platforms: 1
- Tracks: 2

Construction
- Structure type: Underground

Other information
- Station code: 118

History
- Opened: July 19, 1985; 41 years ago

Services
Preceding station	Busan Metro	Following station
Beomil towards Dadaepo Beach	Line 1	Seomyeon towards Nopo
Location

Beomnaegol Station (Korean: 범내골역) is a station of the Busan Metro Line 1 in Beomcheon-dong, Busanjin District, Busan, South Korea.
