= Dongdaesin station =

Station of the Busan Metro

108 동대신 Dongdaesin
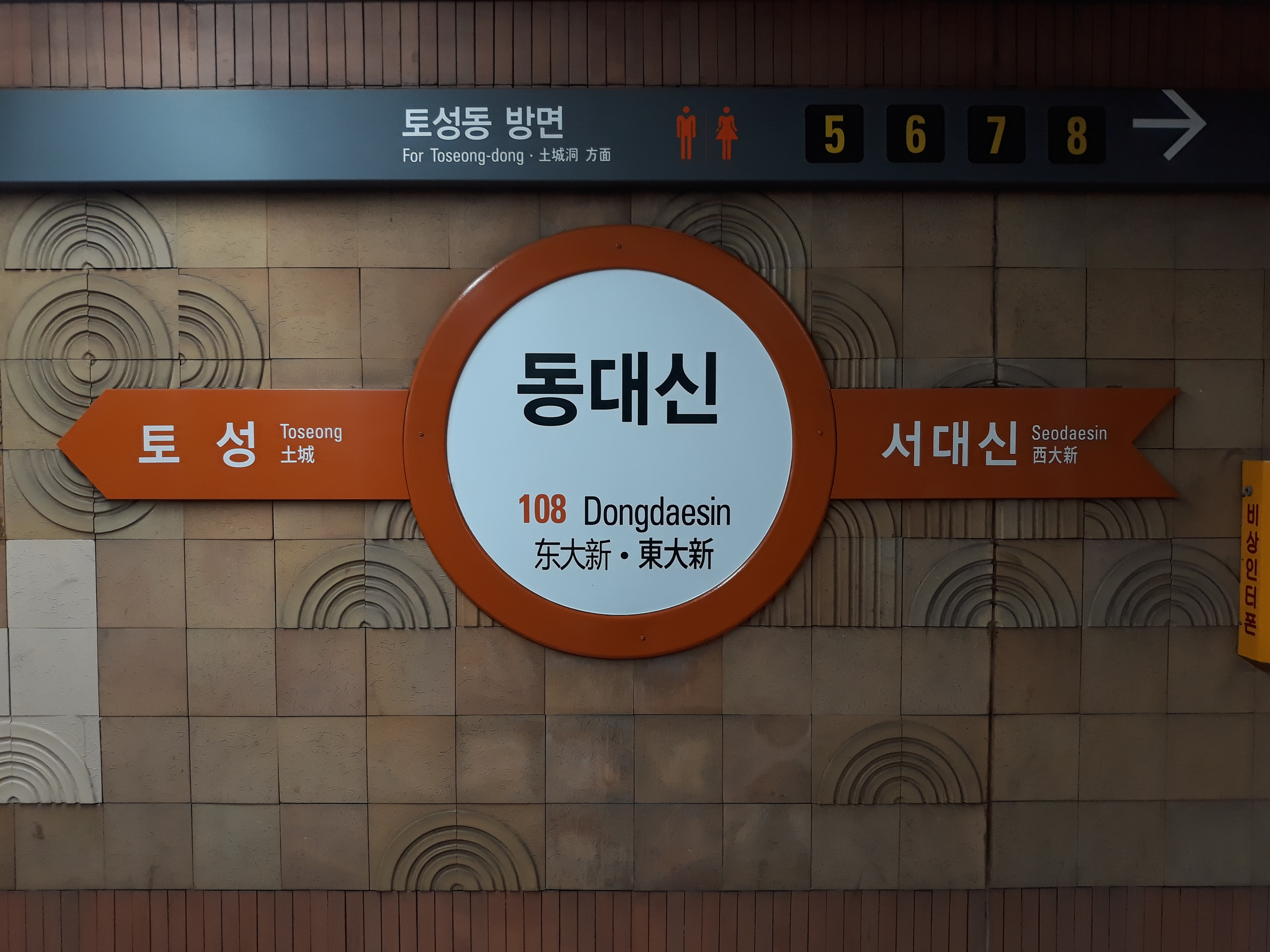

Korean name
- Hangul: 동대신역
- Hanja: 東大新驛
- Revised Romanization: Dongdaesin-yeok
- McCune–Reischauer: Tongdaesin-yŏk

General information
- Location: Dongdaesin-dong, Seo District, Busan; South Korea
- Coordinates: 35°06′38″N 129°01′04″E
- Operator: Busan Transportation Corporation
- Line: Busan Metro Line 1
- Platforms: 2
- Tracks: 2

Construction
- Structure type: Underground

Other information
- Station code: 108

History
- Opened: February 28, 1990; 36 years ago

Services
Preceding station	Busan Metro	Following station
Seodaesin towards Dadaepo Beach	Line 1	Toseong towards Nopo
Location

Dongdaesin Station (Korean: 동대신역; Hanja: 東大新驛) is a station of the Busan Metro Line 1 in Dongdaesin-dong, Seo District, Busan, South Korea.
