= Gukje Market =

Market in Busan, South Korea

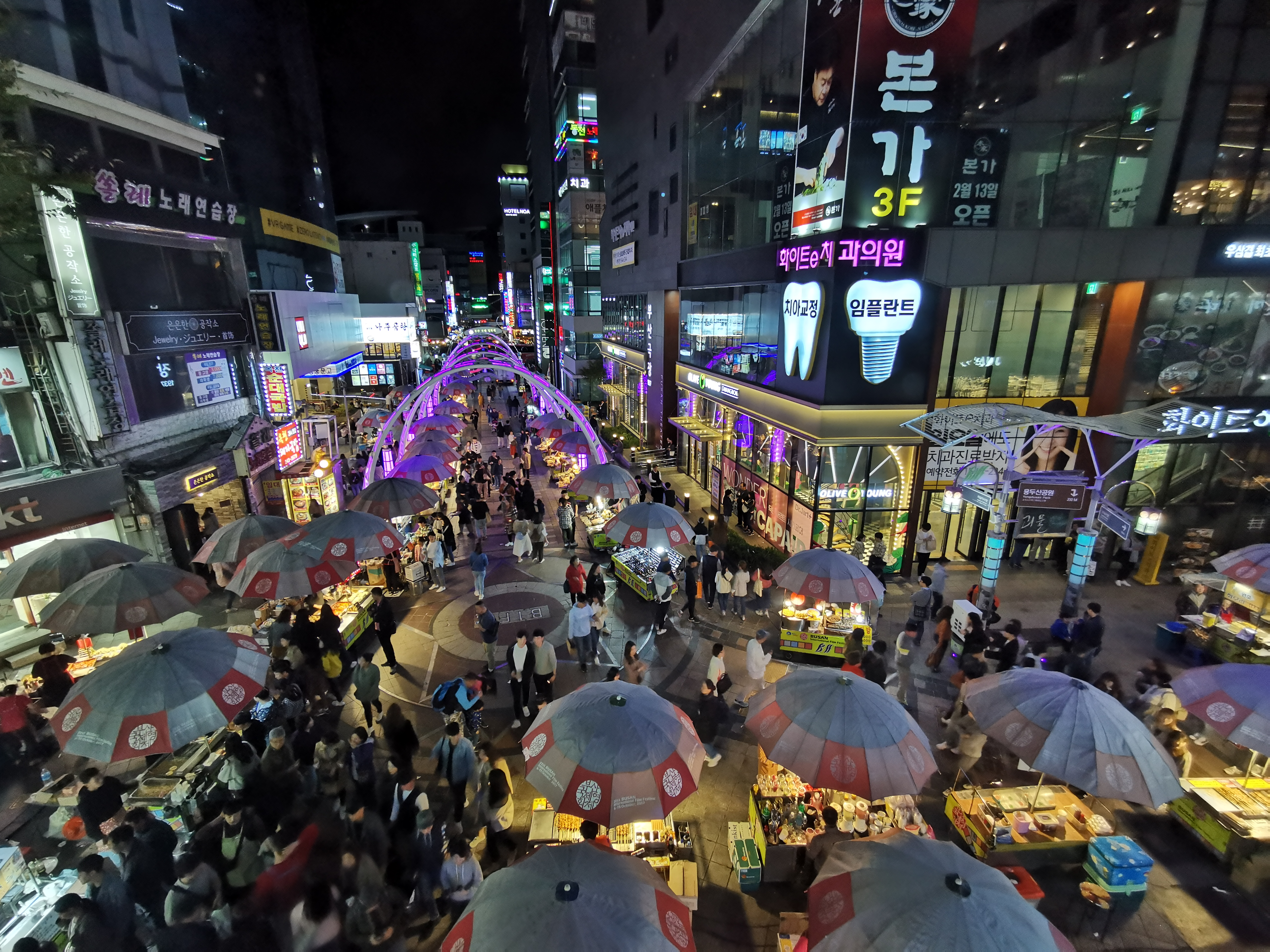
- The market at night (2019)
- Coordinates: 35.101°N 129.028°E
- Address: Sinchang-dong 4-ga, Jung District, Busan, South Korea
- Parking: Yongdusan Park Public Parking
- Website: eng.gukjemarket.co.kr (in English)

Korean name
- Hangul: 국제시장
- Hanja: 國際市場
- RR: Gukje sijang
- MR: Kukche sijang

Gukje Market (Korean: 국제시장) or Nampodong International Market is a market in Sinchang-dong, Jung District, Busan, South Korea. It was originally known by the name Dottaegi Market, and later as Jayu Market.

The market was founded in 1945 under the name Dotegi Market in an empty lot. It sold goods left behind by the Japanese during their departure from Korea after the Japanese Colonial Period ended. Items procured from foreign trade and with U.S Military members were also sold. This catapulted the rise of the markets business. In 1948 the name of the market changed to a free market and later to an international market in 1950. During the 1950–1953 Korean War, the market became a hotspot for commerce and culture, as people from all over the Korean peninsula sought refuge in the Busan area.

Today Gukje Market spans 6 zones, 12 buildings, 24 spaces and countless vendors. The market now sells a diverse array of goods, particularly machinery tools, kitchenware, and clothing. Newer storefronts, restaurants, and attractions have been added in recent years. It is accessible from the Jagalchi and Nampo subway stations. It is within walking distance to two other markets, Bupyeong Market and Jagalchi Market.

The market was famously depicted in the 2014 film of the same Korean name (English title Ode to My Father). The film is currently the fourth highest-grossing film in the history of South Korean cinema, with 14.2 million tickets sold.

== History ==
It is one of the oldest continuously operating marketplaces in South Korea, operating for nearly 80 years, having started in 1945, just after the Japanese colonial period. Its original name was Dottaegi Market (도떼기시장; lit. 'Bustling Market'). In 1948, it changed its name to Jayu Market (자유시장; lit. 'Freedom Market'). The market received its current name in May 1950.

The market changed drastically in character in the 1950s. Busan (Pusan) became the interim capital (18AUG1950-27OCT1950 & 4JAN1951-15AUG1953) and experienced an astounding mass immigration. During the Korean War, Busan would see nearly 800,000 refugees. In June 1950, 200,000 evacuees from Seoul, January 1951, 500,000 evacuees from Seoul, and 100,000 Refugees from North Korea after the Chinese people's volunteer force occupied Seoul. During this time, an influx of U.S. soldiers arrived in response to the U.S. Army constructing a military complex in the area, thus increasing need for trade and boosting the market's business and clientele. during the Korean War. Busan (then associated with the Pusan Perimeter), was a hub for refugees escaping the war. There, refugees set up stalls to sell goods and make a living. Of particular popularity was imported or foreign goods (particularly from the U.S. Army), which were generally forbidden for Koreans to own, let alone sell. Due to the increase in foreign goods, some illegal. A bustling Black market soon formed alongside Gukje Market. Koreans from across the peninsula, as well as Koreans who were just returning from Japan, settled down in Busan and started new lives there. By 1951, Busan held 1/3 of South Korea's Population. Many people had no family support network to lean on.

=== Fires ===
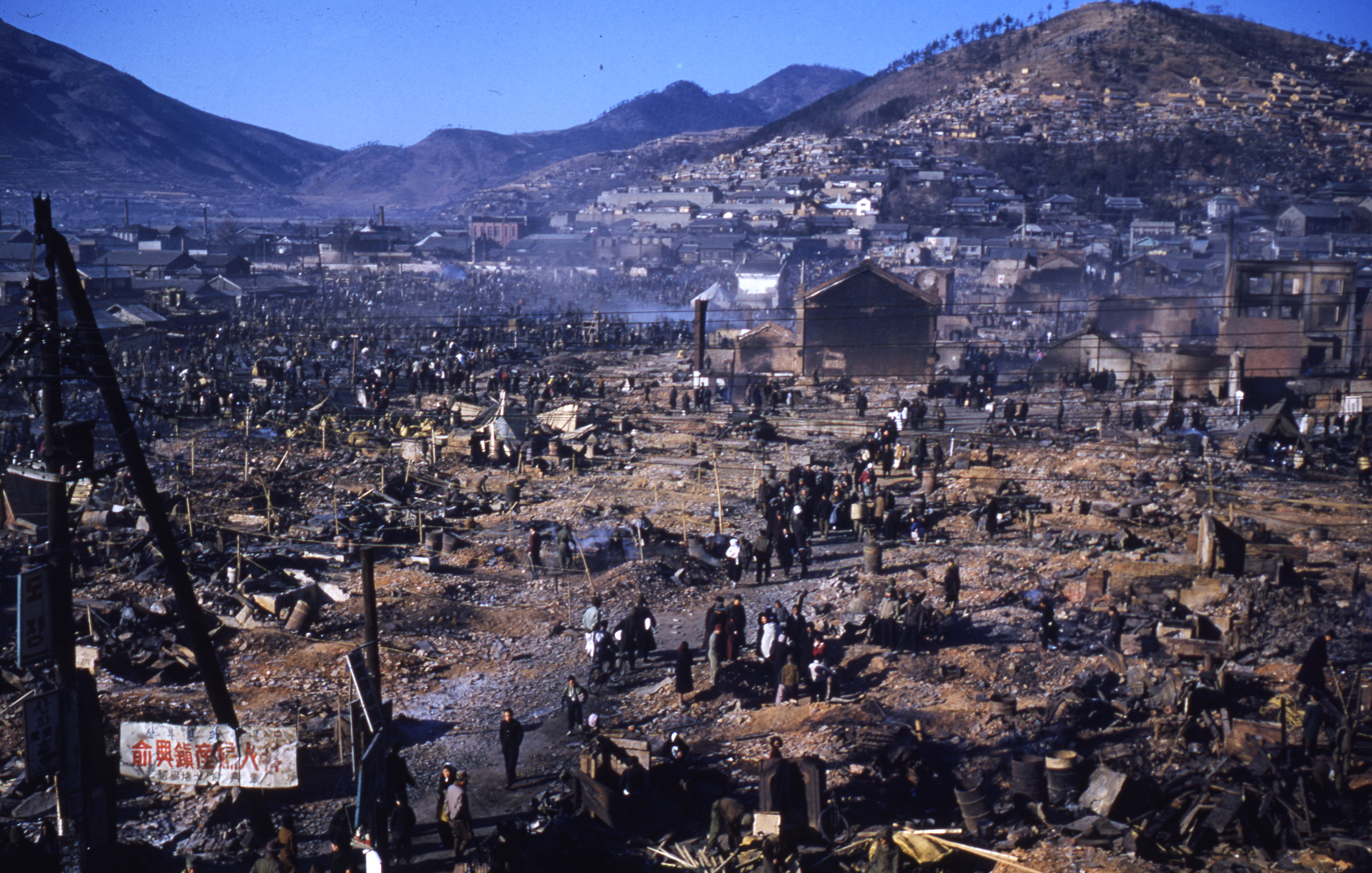
Ruins after the 1953 fire

Gukje Market has experienced significant damage from fires in 1950 and 1953. On January 30, 1953, there was a significant fire in the market. The fire was caused by three drunk cosmetics merchants, who knocked over an oil lamp in the market restaurant Chunhyangwon (춘향원), which was in the north part of the market. The fire spread rapidly and consumed the entire market. The fire spread to Changseon Market (창선시장) and largely destroyed that market as well. At the time, Busan had a significant number of Korean War refugees who lived in highly flammable shantytowns. Many of these shanty buildings were destroyed in the blaze. The fire continued for nine hours since its beginning, until 1:00 a.m. on January 31. The fire destroyed around 1,600 structures, caused damages of around 1 trillion won, and displaced 22,500 people from 6,800 households.

The market, which had been extremely large and bustling, didn't regain its former size and status after the 1953 fire, especially as the Korean War was cooling down and people were returning home.

=== Recent history ===
Until the 1990s, the market was considered a key place to acquire foreign goods. With the advent of the internet, that role has diminished. In 2023, it was reported that many traditional businesses in the market have closed or are struggling.. In an effort to modernize, shops catering to younger people and foreign clientele have replaced more traditional shops. In 2015 Gukje Market participated in the Global Luxury Mark Promotion Project. The initiative was to introduce the market on a global scale as a cultural landmark

The Korean title of the 2014 film Ode to My Father is actually the name of this market. The film centers around a family who owns a shop in the market ("Kkotbunine"), and their experience from the Korean War until the present day.

== Gallery ==
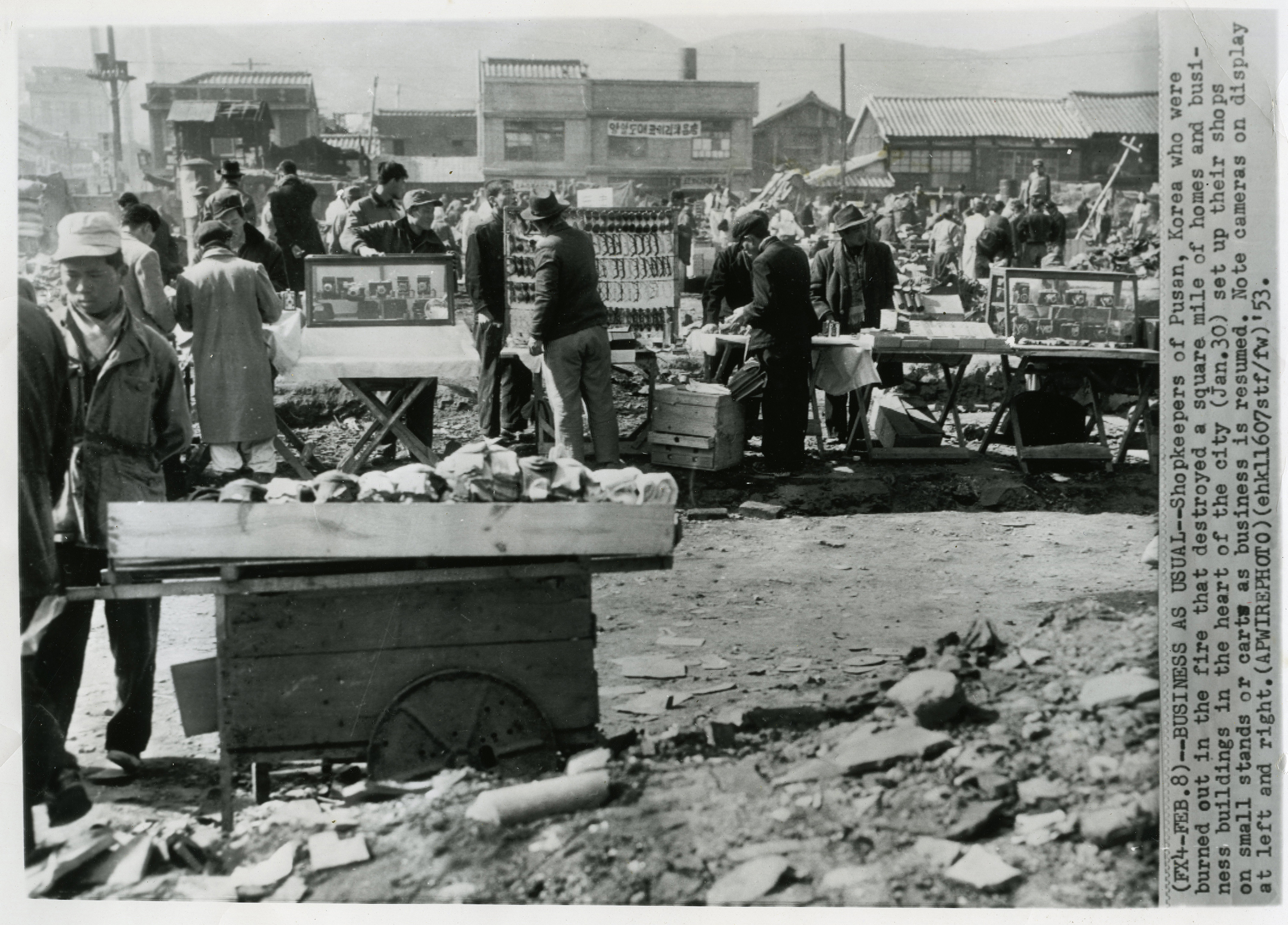
The market, with renewed activity around just a week after the fire (February 8, 1953)

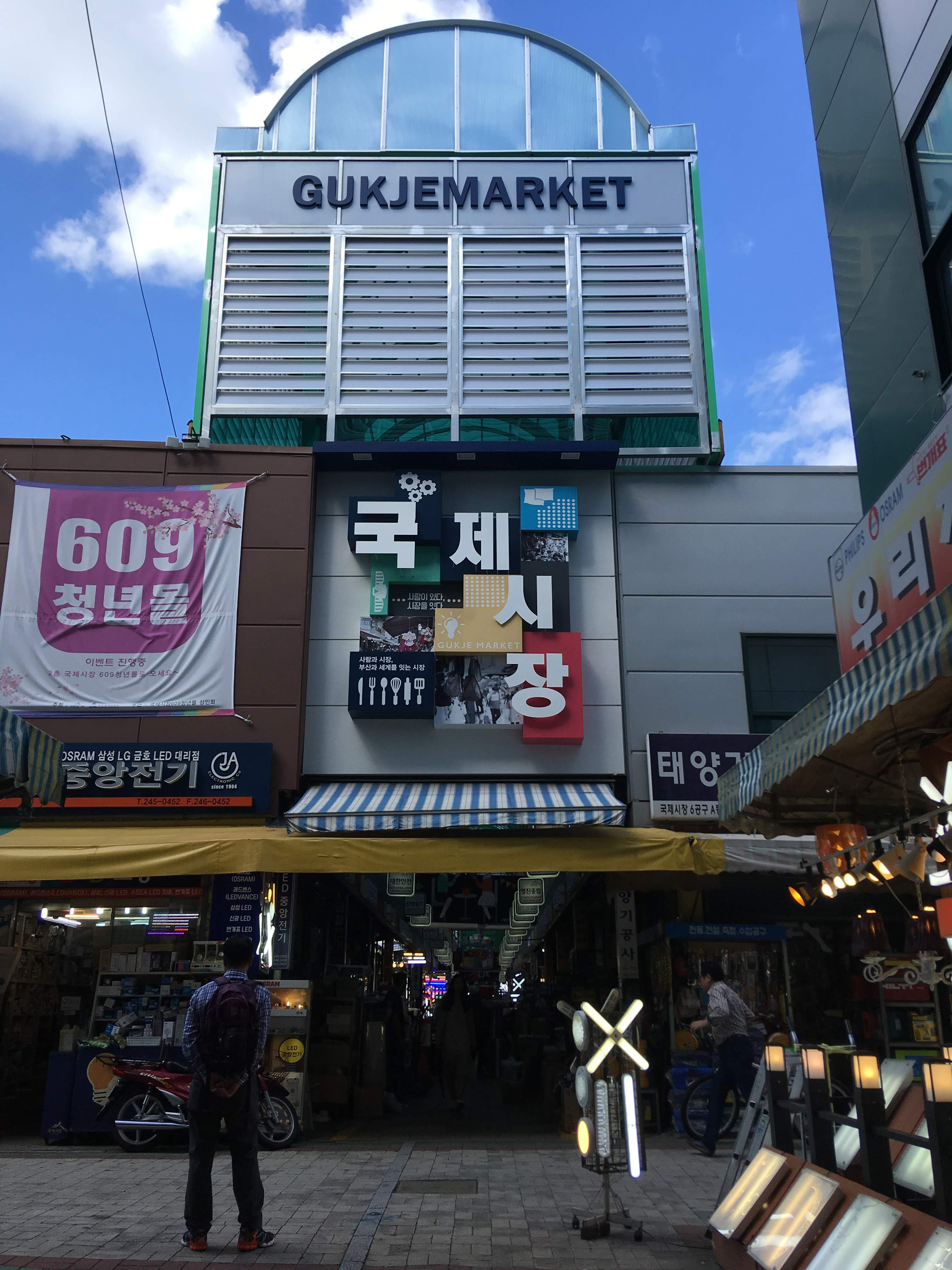
A sign for the market (2018)

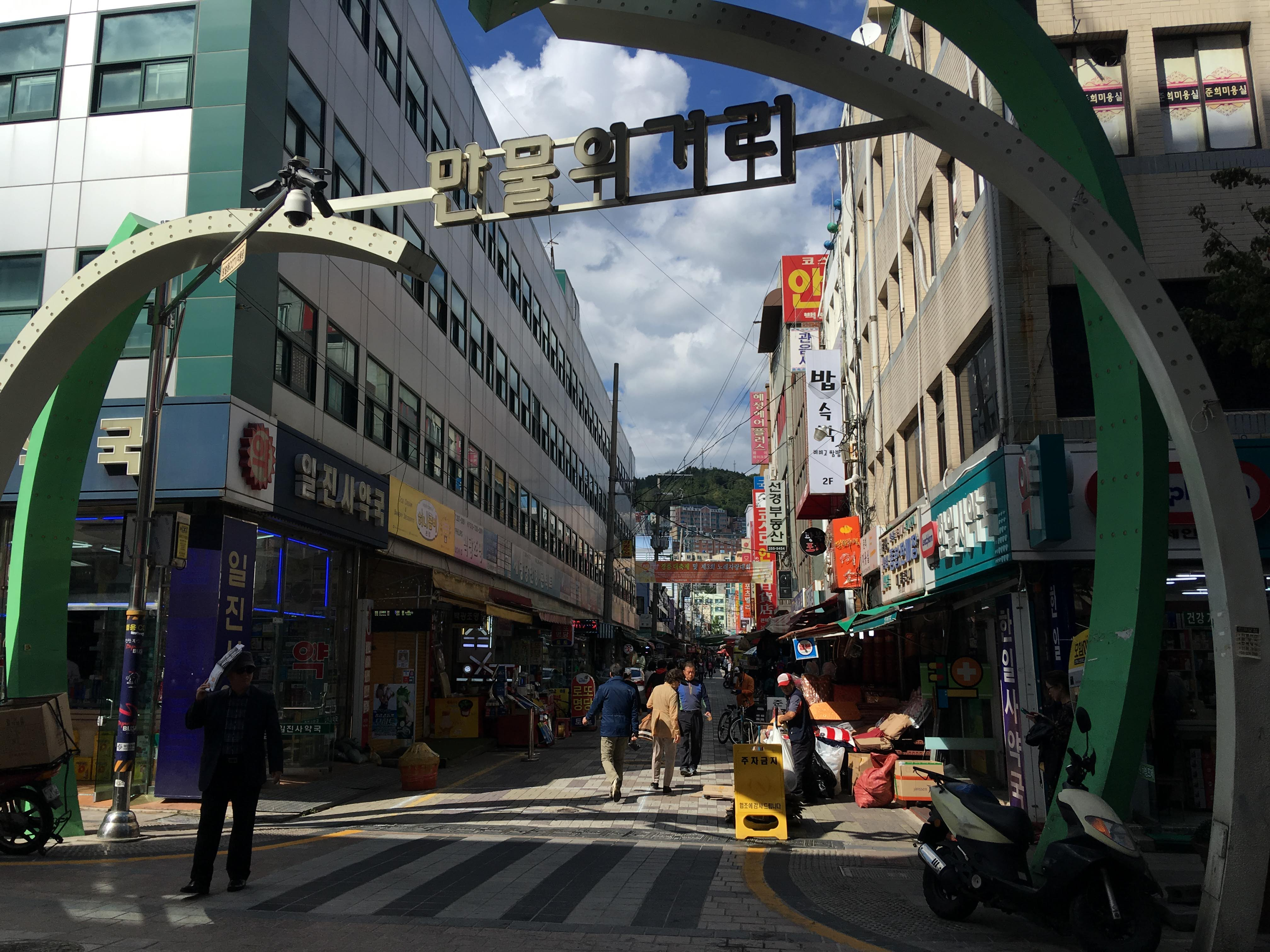
Manmul Street in the market (2018)

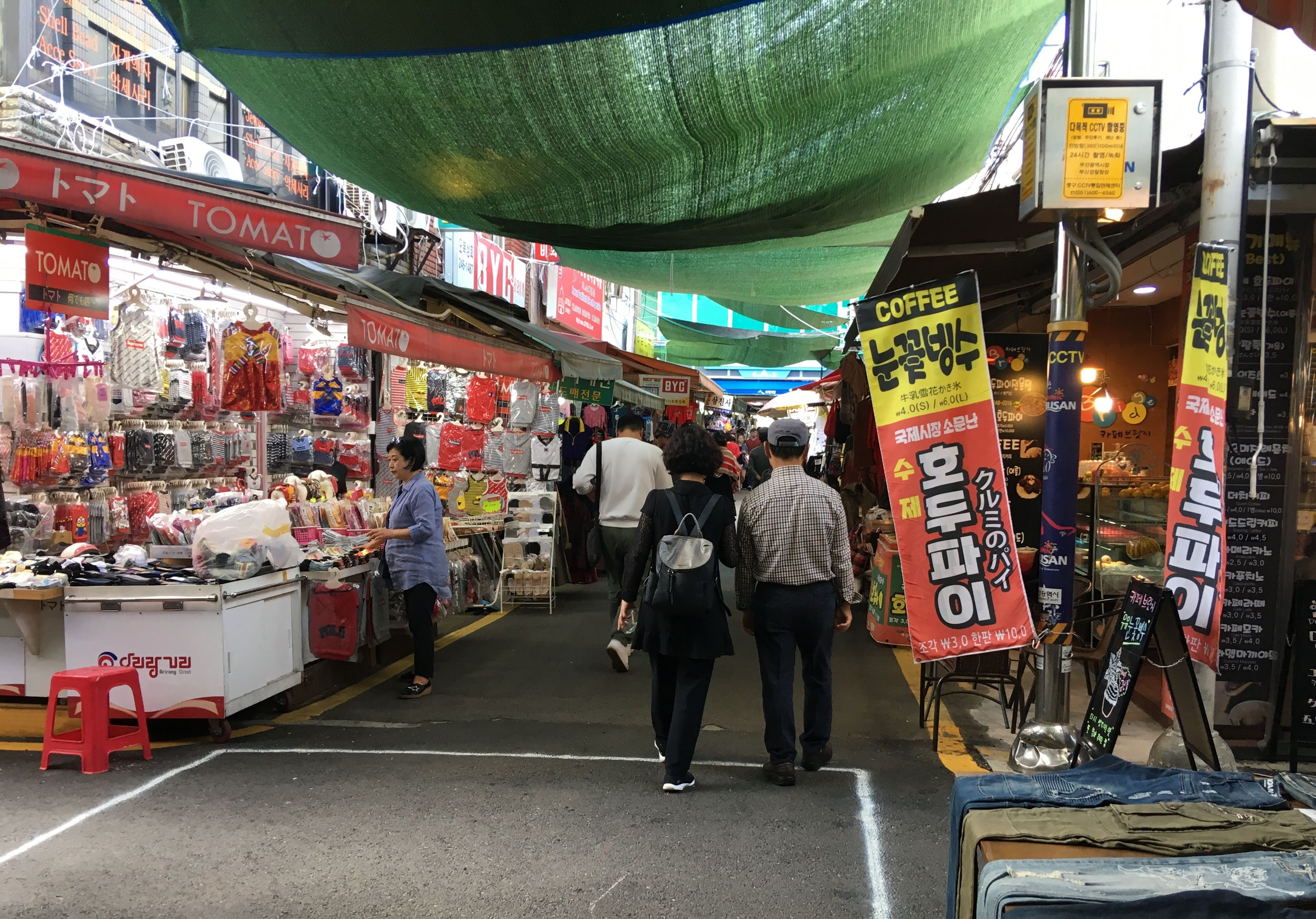
A street in the market (2018)

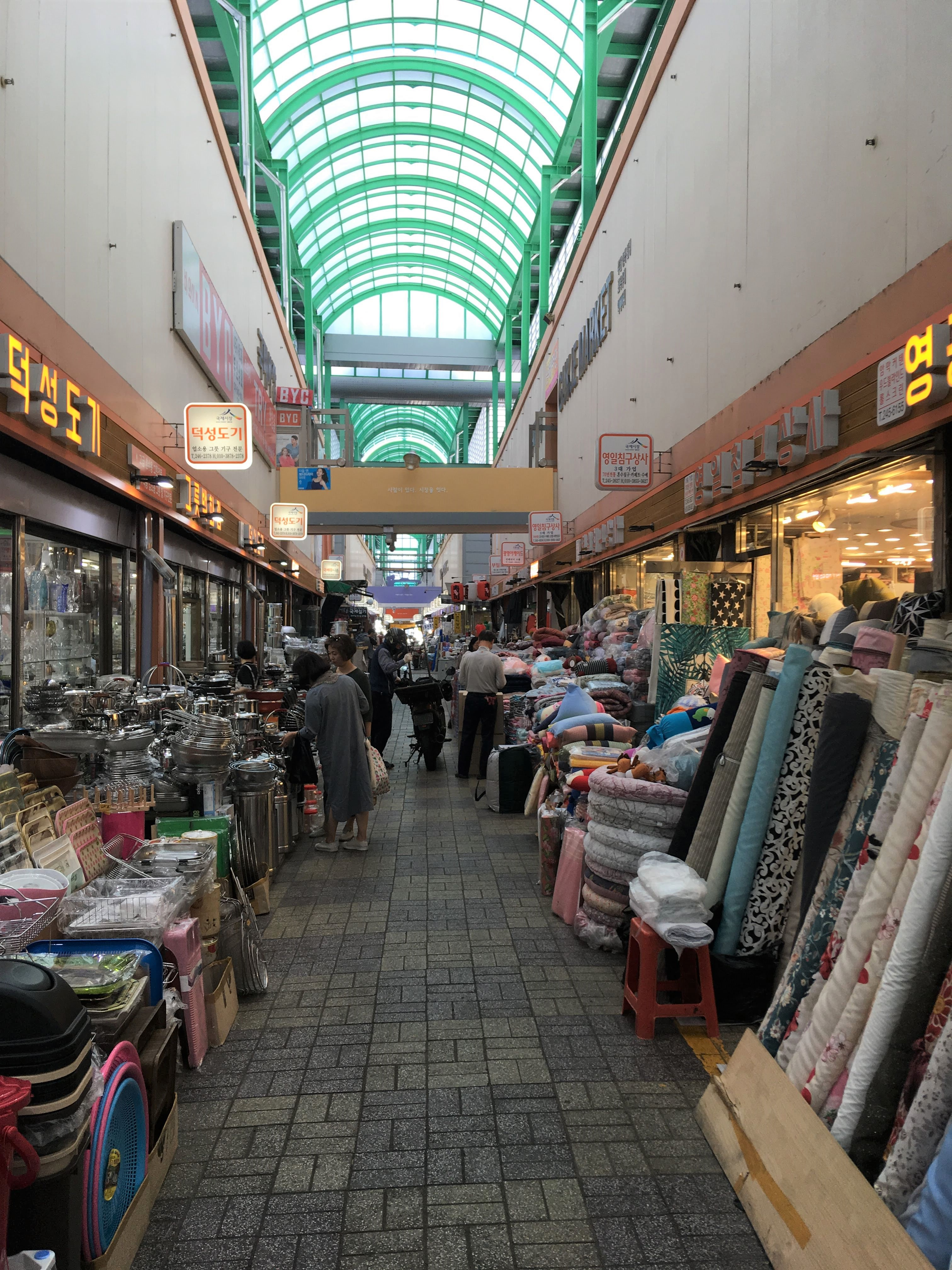
A covered shopping street (2018)

== See also ==
- List of markets in South Korea
- List of South Korean tourist attractions
