= Sinpyeong station =

Station of the Busan Metro

101 신평 Sinpyeong
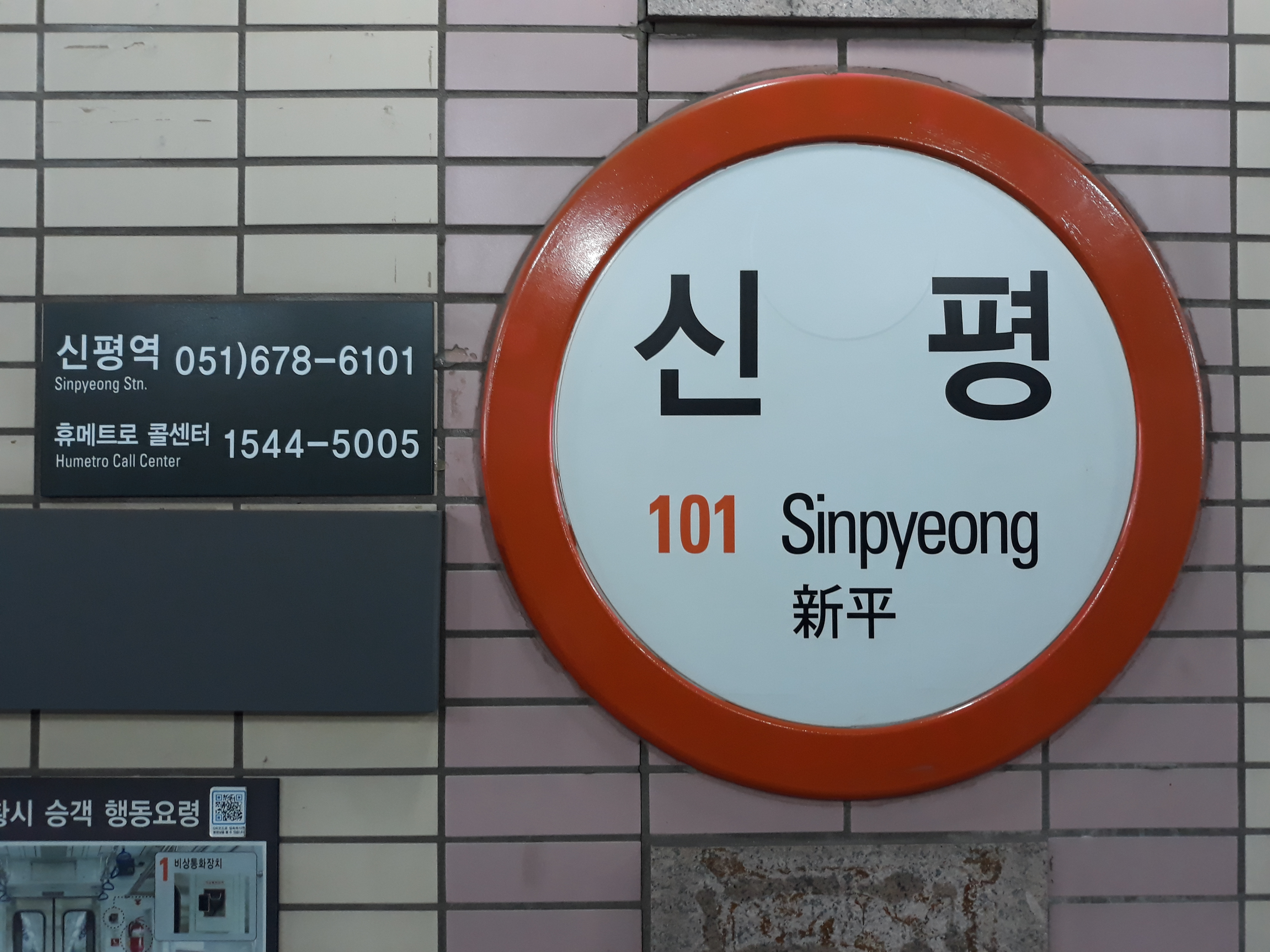

Korean name
- Hangul: 신평역
- Hanja: 新平驛
- Revised Romanization: Sinpyeongyeok
- McCune–Reischauer: Sinp'yŏngyŏk

General information
- Location: Sinpyeong-dong, Saha District, Busan; South Korea
- Coordinates: 35°05′44″N 128°57′38″E
- Operator: Busan Transportation Corporation
- Line: Line 1
- Platforms: 2
- Tracks: 2

Construction
- Structure type: Aboveground
- Accessible: yes

Other information
- Station code: 101

History
- Opened: June 23, 1994; 32 years ago

Services
| Preceding station | Busan Metro | Following station |
|---|---|---|
| Dongmae towards Dadaepo Beach | Line 1 | Hadan towards Nopo |
Location

Sinpyeong Station is a station of Busan Metro Line 1 located in Sinpyeong-dong, Saha District, Busan, South Korea.
