= Jungang station (Busan Metro) =

Station of the Busan Metro

112 중앙 Jungang
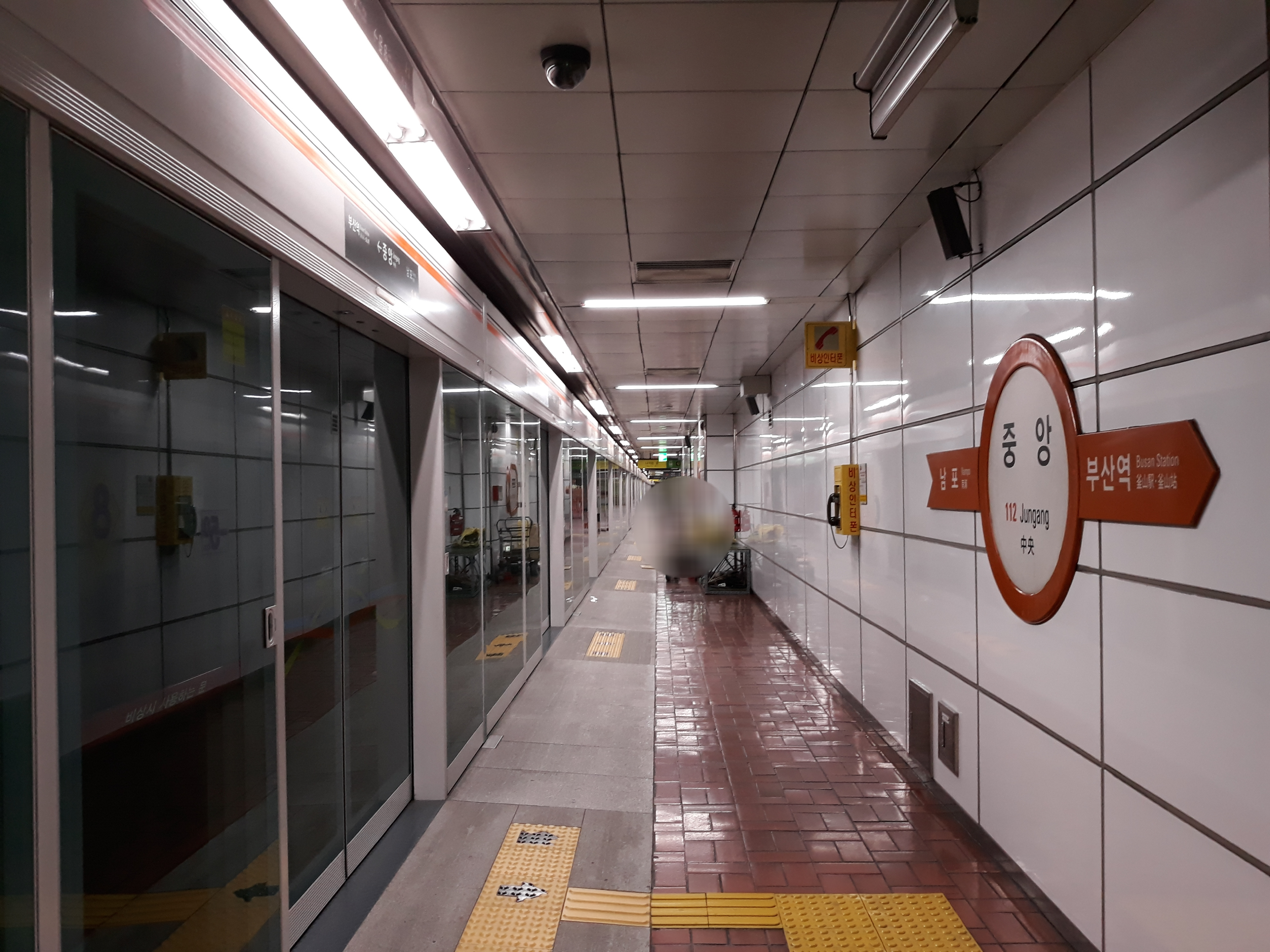

Korean name
- Hangul: 중앙역
- Hanja: 中央驛
- Revised Romanization: Jung-ang-yeok
- McCune–Reischauer: Chungang-yŏk

General information
- Location: Jungang-dong, Jung District, Busan; South Korea
- Coordinates: 35°06′03″N 129°01′11″E
- Operator: Busan Transportation Corporation
- Line: Line 1
- Platforms: 1
- Tracks: 2

Construction
- Structure type: Underground

Other information
- Station code: 112

History
- Opened: May 15, 1987; 39 years ago

Services
Preceding station	Busan Metro	Following station
Nampo towards Dadaepo Beach	Line 1	Busan Station towards Nopo
Location

Jungang station (Korean: 중앙역; Hanja: 中央驛) is a station of Busan Metro Line 1 in Jungang-dong, Jung District, Busan, South Korea.

== Station layout ==
G	Street Level
L1	Concourse	Faregates, Ticketing Machines, Station Control
L2; Platforms	Side platform, doors will open on the right
L2; Platforms	Westbound	← Line 1 toward Dadaepo Beach (Nampo)
L2; Platforms	Eastbound	→ Line 1 toward Nopo (Busan Station) →
L2; Platforms	Side platform, doors will open on the right

== Vicinity ==
- Exit 1: 7 Eleven
- Exit 2: Kohler
- Exit 3: Sinchang Nursing Hospital, NHN Travel Doctor Busan Branch
- Exit 4: SK Energy
- Exit 5: HOLLYS COFFEE
- Exit 6: Taipei Economic and Cultural Office in Busan
- Exit 7: Busan Regional Fair Trade Office
- Exit 8: Yuseong Cafe, Jangchunhyang
- Exit 9: Busan Regional Fair Trade Office
- Exit 10: GS25
- Exit 11: BMW Dongsung Motors Busan Central Exhibition Center, Milhanzum Center
- Exit 12: Hanjin
- Exit 13: GS25
- Exit 14: Hanjin
- Exit 15: China Southern Airlines Corporation Busan Branch
- Exit 17: Hanwha Insurance Busan Central Branch
