= Busanjin station (Busan Metro) =

Station of the Busan Metro, Busan, South Korea

Coordinates: 35.1278°N 129.0479°E

115 부산진 (해양수산부·동구청) Busanjin (Ministry of Oceans & Fisheries·Dong-gu Office)
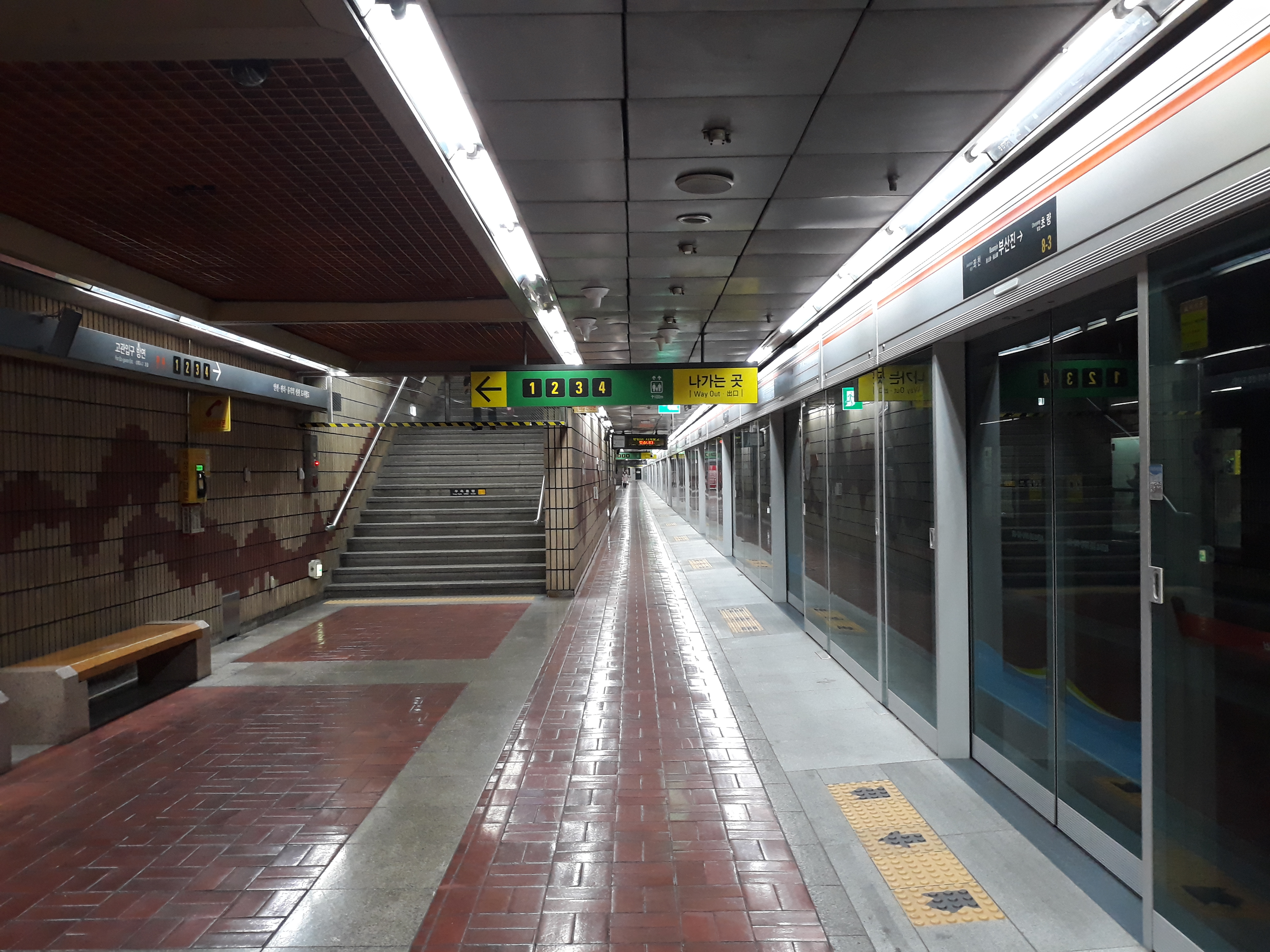

General information
- Location: Sujeong-dong, Dong District, Busan; South Korea
- Operator: Busan Transportation Corporation
- Line: Busan Metro Line 1
- Platforms: 2
- Tracks: 2

Construction
- Structure type: Underground

Other information
- Station code: 115

History
- Opened: May 15, 1987; 39 years ago

Services
Preceding station	Busan Metro	Following station
Choryang towards Dadaepo Beach	Line 1	Jwacheon towards Nopo
Location

Busanjin Station (Korean: 부산진역; Hanja: 釜山鎭驛) is a station of the Busan Metro Line 1 in Sujeong-dong, Dong District, Busan, South Korea. The station is unrelated to the Busanjin Station of Korail.
