= Toseong station =

Station of the Busan Metro

109 토성 Toseong
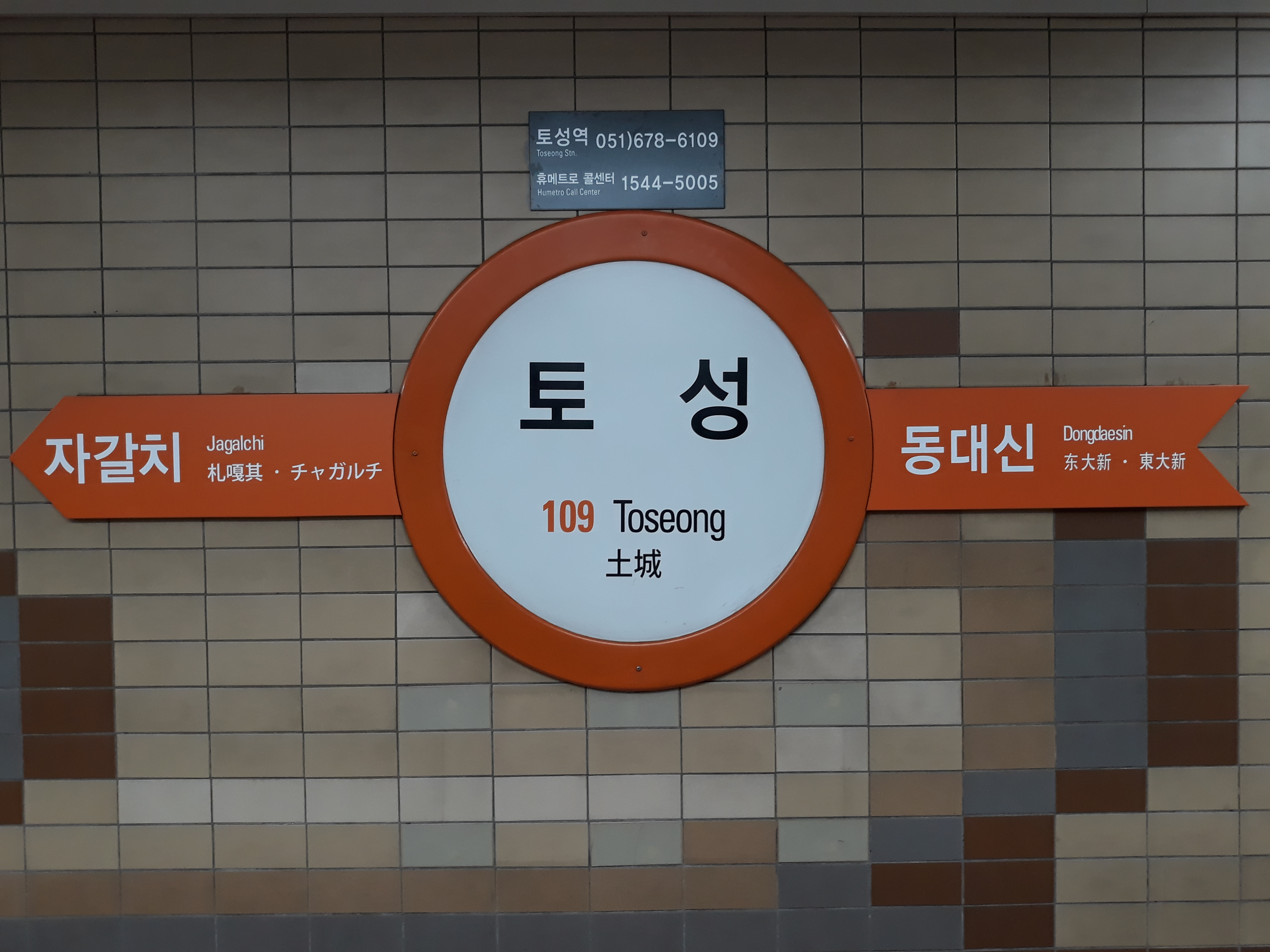

Korean name
- Hangul: 토성역
- Hanja: 土城驛
- Revised Romanization: Toseong yeok
- McCune–Reischauer: T'osŏng yŏk

General information
- Location: Toseong-dong, Seo District, Busan; South Korea
- Coordinates: 35°06′03″N 129°01′11″E
- Operator: Busan Transportation Corporation
- Line: Busan Metro Line 1
- Platforms: 2
- Tracks: 2

Construction
- Structure type: Underground

Other information
- Station code: 109

History
- Opened: May 19, 1988; 38 years ago

Services
Preceding station	Busan Metro	Following station
Dongdaesin towards Dadaepo Beach	Line 1	Jagalchi towards Nopo
Location

Toseong Station (Korean: 토성역; Hanja: 土城驛) is a station of Busan Metro Line 1 in Toseong-dong, Seo District, Busan, South Korea. The station opened in 1988 as Toseongdong Station (토성동역) but was changed to its current name in 2010.
