= Sasang–Hadan Line =

Light metro line in Busan, South Korea

Overview
- Status: Under construction
- Owner: Busan Metropolitan City
- Locale: Busan, South Korea
- Termini: Sasang Station; Hadan Station
- Stations: 6 (Phase 1), 13 (Phase 2)
- Website: https://www.humetro.busan.kr/

Service
- System: Busan Metro
- Operator: Busan Transportation Corporation
- Rolling stock: Woojin Industrial Systems BTC Class 5000

History
- Planned opening: 2027 (Phase 1), 2032 (Phase 2)

Technical
- Line length: 6.9 km (4.3 mi)
- Character: Underground automated light metro
- Signalling: ATC / ATO (manual and automatic operation)

Sasang–Hadan Line is a prospective light metro line in Busan, South Korea. The first phase will connect Sasang Station to Hadan Station. It is highly likely to open under the name "Line 5", scheduled to open in 2027. The second phase, connecting Hadan Station to Noksan Station, is scheduled to open in 2032.

Plans to construct a line from Noksan-dong to Sasang station have been proposed since the 1990s, but were cancelled due to the 1997 Asian financial crisis. In the 2000s, city planners opted to omit the relatively underdeveloped Noksan area in favor of building a shorter, 6.9km line from Sasang to Hadan station first, with the option for later expansion.

== Infrastructure ==
All stations will have elevators, escalators, and platform screen doors. The line will be equipped for unmanned automatic operation and will have a central control system for management of the entire line, eliminating the need for staff to be present at stations. Construction began in 2016 and is expected to be completed in 2026 with total operating expenses of 73.2 billion won.

== Stations ==
Station Number	Station name			Transfer	Distance in km	Total distance	Location	
Station Number	English	Hangul	Hanja	Transfer	Distance in km	Total distance	Location	
501	Sasang	사상	沙上	Busan–Gimhae Light Rail Transit	-	0.0	Busan	Sasang District
502	Saebyeok Market	새벽시장	晨昏市場				Busan	Sasang District
503	Sasang Smart City	사상스마트시티	思想스마트城市				Busan	Sasang District
504	Hakjang	학장	學長				Busan	Sasang District
505	Eomgung	엄궁	嚴宮				Busan	Saha District
506	Dong-a University	동아대학교	東亞大學					Saha District
507	Hadan	하단	下端	Busan Metro Line 1		6.90		Saha District

== See also ==
- Busan Metro
