= Seodaesin station =

Station of the Busan Metro

107 서대신 (삼육부산병원) Seodaesin (Sahmyook Busan Hospital)
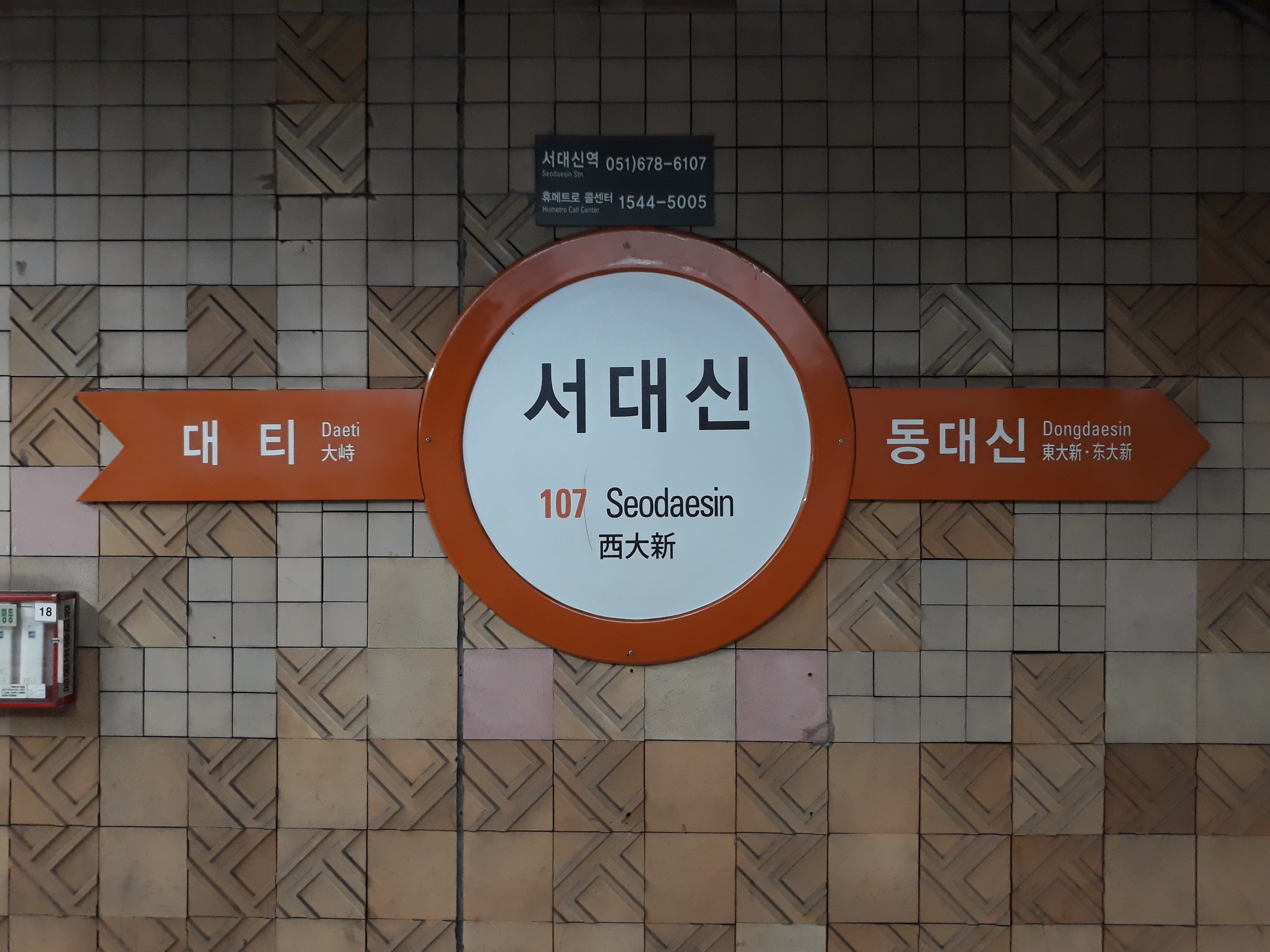

Korean name
- Hangul: 서대신역
- Hanja: 西大新驛
- Revised Romanization: Seodaesinnyeok
- McCune–Reischauer: Sŏdaesinnyŏk

General information
- Location: Seodaesin-dong, Seo District, Busan; South Korea
- Coordinates: 35°06′39″N 129°00′43″E
- Operator: Busan Transportation Corporation
- Line: Busan Metro Line 1
- Platforms: 1
- Tracks: 2

Construction
- Structure type: Underground

Other information
- Station code: 107

History
- Opened: February 28, 1990; 36 years ago

Services
Preceding station	Busan Metro	Following station
Daeti towards Dadaepo Beach	Line 1	Dongdaesin towards Nopo
Location

Seodaesin Station is a station of Busan Metro Line 1 in Seodaesin-dong, Seo District, Busan, South Korea.
