= Hadan station (Busan Metro) =

Station of the Busan Metro

Coordinates: 35°06′22″N 128°58′00″E

102 하단 (아트몰링) Hadan (Art Malling)
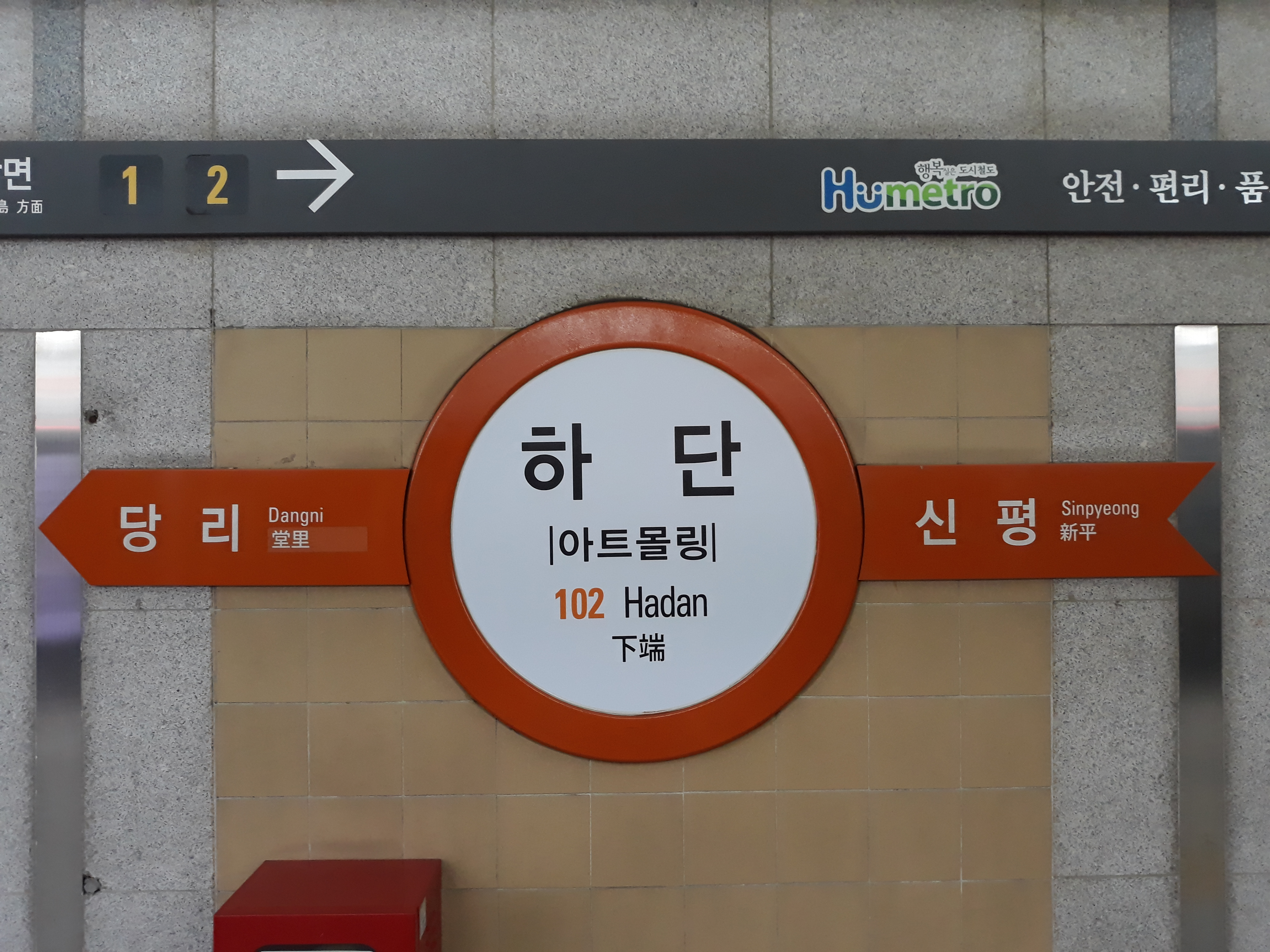

Korean name
- Hangul: 하단역
- Hanja: 下端驛
- Revised Romanization: Hadanyeok
- McCune–Reischauer: Hadanyŏk

General information
- Location: Hadan-dong, Saha District, Busan; South Korea
- Operator: Busan Transportation Corporation
- Line: Line 1
- Platforms: 2
- Tracks: 2

Construction
- Structure type: Underground

Other information
- Station code: 102

History
- Opened: June 23, 1994; 32 years ago

Services
Preceding station	Busan Metro	Following station
Sinpyeong towards Dadaepo Beach	Line 1	Dangni towards Nopo
Location

Hadan Station is a metro station of the Busan Metro Line 1 in Hadan-dong, Saha District, Busan, South Korea.
