= Nampo Station =

Nampo Station may refer to:

- Nampo Station (Busan)
- Namp'o Station (P'yŏngnam Line)
- Nampo Station (Boryeong)
