= Busan Metro Line 1 =

Subway line in Busan, South Korea

Line 1
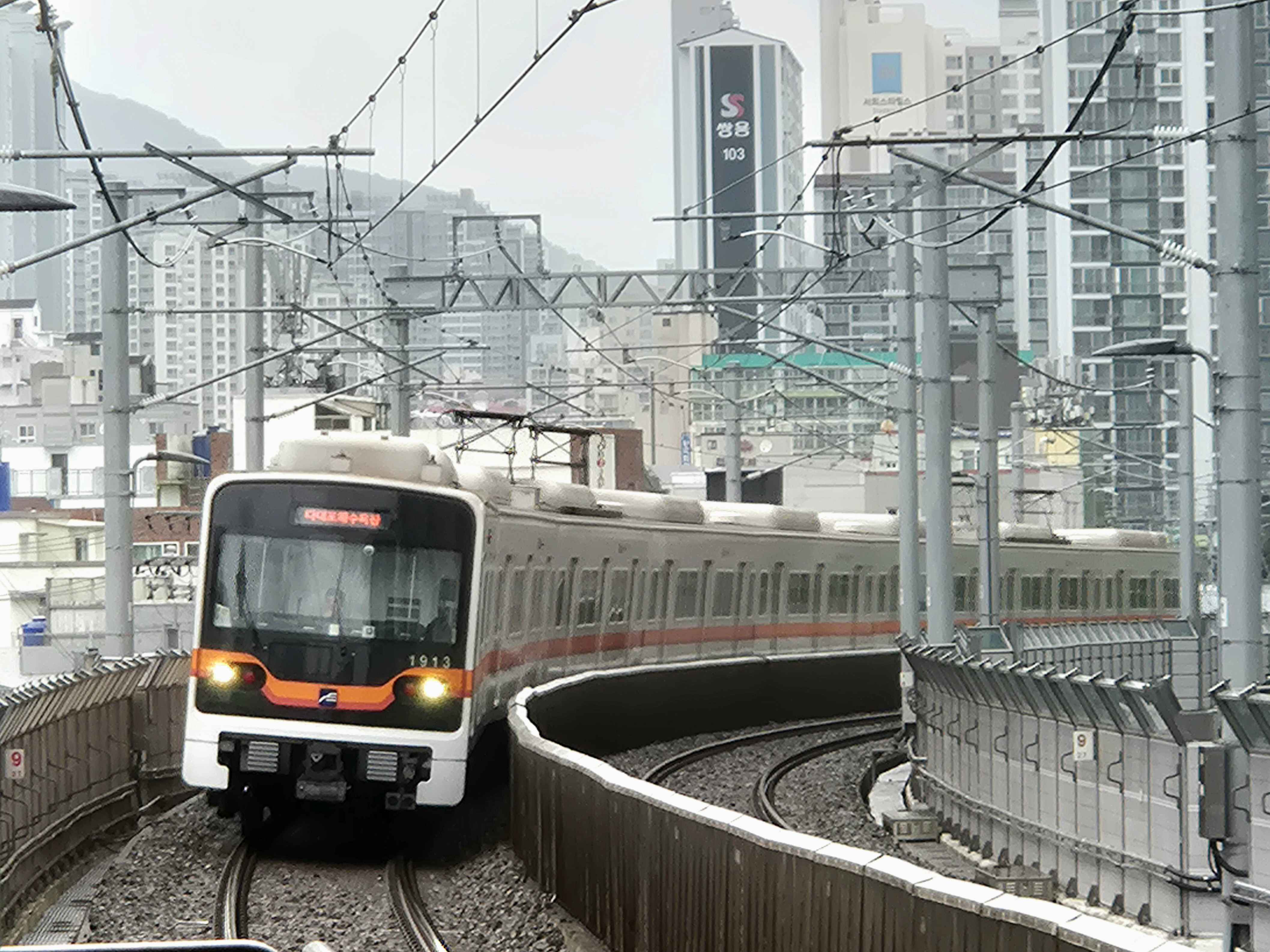
- Line 1 trainset 113 bound for Dadaepo Beach Station

Overview
- Native name: 1호선(1號線); Il Hoseon
- Status: Operational
- Owner: Busan Metropolitan City
- Termini: Dadaepo Beach; Nopo
- Stations: 40
- Website: https://www.humetro.busan.kr/

Service
- Type: Rapid transit
- System: Busan Metro
- Services: 1
- Operator: Busan Transportation Corporation
- Rolling stock: Hyundai Rotem BTC Class 1000 (second generation) Woojin Industrial Systems BTC Class 1000 (third generation)

History
- Opened: July 19, 1985; 41 years ago
- Last extension: 2017

Technical
- Line length: 40.5 km (25.2 mi)
- Number of tracks: 2
- Track gauge: 1,435 mm (4 ft 8 1/2 in)
- Operating speed: 80 km/h (50 mph)
- Signalling: ATC / ATO (manual and automatic operation)

Busan Metro Line 1 is the north-south route of the Busan Metro. It is 40.4 kilometres (25.1 mi) long with 40 stations, and is considered the second longest line of the Busan Metro system, just behind Line 2. But with Line 1 going to regions such as Jagalchi Station, Busan Station, Seomyeon Station, Dongnae Station, and Nopo Station, it is deemed the most popular line of all of the Busan Metro system. Line 1 uses 8-car trains. The line color is orange. Its station signs are circular with a white face and orange frame, boasting the name of the station in Korean in big Hangul letters with the smaller English name below it with the station number in orange beside it and the Hanja name at the bottom of their face in similar-sized font. Unlike in the other stations, Line 1's station signs typically lack arms sprouting from their sides, even on the outer walls; instead, the neighboring stations are printed on a black strip that runs across the outer wall; some exceptions exist as in Seomyeon station, where the signs use the designs used for Lines 3 and 4, albeit with an orange frame.

== History ==
Plans to create this line began in 1979. In 2009, Busan Transportation Corporation planned to complete the fifth section extension of the metro line by late 2013, but later on postponed it to November 2016.

=== 1980s ===
- June 13, 1981: Constructed the first section from Beomnaegol Station (118) to Nopo Station (134).
- July 28, 1983: Constructed the second section from Jungang Station (112) to Beomnaegol Station (118).
- August 14, 1984: Constructed the third section from Seodaesin Station (107) to Jungang Station (112).
- July 19, 1985: Opened the first section service from Beomnaegol Station (118) to Beomeosa Station (133).
- December 19, 1986 : Opened the first section service for Nopo Station (134).
- May 15, 1987: Opened the second section service from Jungang Station (112) to Beomnaegol Station (118).
- May 19, 1988: Opened the third section service from Toseong Station (109) to Jungang Station (112).

=== 1990s ===
- February 28, 1990: Opened the third section service from Seodaesin Station (107) to Toseong Station (109).
- July 24, 1990: Constructed the fourth section from Sinpyeong Station (101) to Seodaesin Station (107).
- June 23, 1994: Opened the fourth section from Sinpyeong Station (101) to Seodaesin Station (107).

=== 2000s ===
- November 20, 2009: Began construction for the fifth section from Dadae Station to Sinpyeong Station (101).

=== 2010s ===
- February 24, 2010: Seodaesin (107), Dongdaesin (108), Toseong (109), Nampo (111), Jungang (112), Choryang (114), Jwacheon (116), Beomil (117), Bujeon (120), Yeonsan (123), Myeongnyun (126), Jangjeon (129), Guseo (130), Namsan (132), and (134) Nopo stations were renamed by removing the 'dong' at the end.
- April 20, 2017: Opened the fifth section service from Dadaepo Beach Station (095) to Sinpyeong Station (101).

== Hours of operation ==
The hours of operation of Line 1 start at 5:05 for the ride from Sinpyeong to Nopo at Sinpyeong Station and 5:10 for Nopo to Sinpyeong at Nopo Station. The hours end with the last trains arriving in Sinpyeong at 00:35 and Nopo at 00:30. A ride through the entire line takes about 1 hour 2 minutes.

== List of stations ==
All stations are in Busan.

| Station Number | Station name | | | Transfer | Distance in km | Total distance | Location |
| Station Number | English | Hangul | Hanja | Transfer | Distance in km | Total distance | Location |
|---|---|---|---|---|---|---|---|
| 095 | Dadaepo Beach (Morundae) | 다대포해수욕장 (몰운대) | 多大浦海水浴場 (沒雲臺) | | - | 0.0 | Saha |
| 096 | Dadaepo Harbor | 다대포항 | 多大浦港 | | 1.6 | 1.6 | Saha |
| 097 | Natgae | 낫개 | 낫개 | | 1.3 | 2.9 | Saha |
| 098 | Sinjangnim | 신장림 | 新長林 | | 0.8 | 3.7 | Saha |
| 099 | Jangnim | 장림 | 長林 | | 1.1 | 4.8 | Saha |
| 100 | Dongmae | 동매 | 동매 | | 1.5 | 6.3 | Saha |
| 101 | Sinpyeong | 신평 | 新平 | | 1.6 | 7.9 | Saha |
| 102 | Hadan | 하단 | 下端 | | 1.6 | 9.5 | Saha |
| 103 | Dangni | 당리 (사하구청) | 堂里 | | 0.8 | 10.3 | Saha |
| 104 | Saha | 사하 | 沙下 | | 0.9 | 11.2 | Saha |
| 105 | Goejeong | 괴정 | 槐亭 | | 0.9 | 12.1 | Saha |
| 106 | Daeti | 대티 (동주대학) | 大峙 | | 0.8 | 12.9 | Saha |
| 107 | Seodaesin | 서대신 | 西大新 | | 1.4 | 14.3 | Seo |
| 108 | Dongdaesin | 동대신 | 東大新 | | 0.7 | 15.0 | Seo |
| 109 | Toseong | 토성 | 土城 | | 1.2 | 16.2 | Seo |
| 110 | Jagalchi | 자갈치 | 자갈치 | | 1.0 | 17.2 | Jung |
| 111 | Nampo | 남포 | 南浦 | | 0.7 | 17.9 | Jung |
| 112 | Jungang | 중앙 (그린손해보험) | 中央 | | 0.9 | 18.8 | Jung |
| 113 | Busan Station | 부산역 | 釜山驛 | Gyeongbu; Gyeongbu HSR Saemaeul-ho services Mugunghwa-ho services | 1.1 | 19.9 | Dong |
| 114 | Choryang | 초량 | 草梁 | | 0.8 | 20.7 | Dong |
| 115 | Busanjin | 부산진 | 釜山鎮 | Saemaeul-ho services Mugunghwa-ho services | 0.8 | 21.5 | Dong |
| 116 | Jwacheon | 좌천 (일산기독병원) | 佐川 | | 1.0 | 22.5 | Dong |
| 117 | Beomil | 범일 | 凡一 | | 0.9 | 23.4 | Dong |
| 118 | Beomnaegol | 범내골 | 범내골 | | 0.8 | 24.2 | Busanjin |
| 119 | Seomyeon | 서면 | 西面 | Busan Metro Line 2 | 1.2 | 25.4 | Busanjin |
| 120 | Bujeon | 부전 | 釜田 | Saemaeul-ho services Mugunghwa-ho services | 0.6 | 26.0 | Busanjin |
| 121 | Yangjeong | 양정 (동의과학대학·부산여자대학) | 楊亭 | | 1.4 | 27.4 | Busanjin |
| 122 | City Hall | 시청 (연제) | 市廳 | | 0.8 | 28.2 | Yeonje |
| 123 | Yeonsan | 연산 | 蓮山 | Busan Metro Line 3 | 0.9 | 29.1 | Yeonje |
| 124 | Busan Nat'l Univ. of Edu. | 교대 | 敎育大 | Donghae Line | 1.0 | 30.1 | Yeonje |
| 125 | Dongnae | 동래 | 東萊 | Busan Metro Line 4 | 1.2 | 31.3 | Dongnae |
| 126 | Myeongnyun | 명륜 | 明倫 | | 0.8 | 32.1 | Dongnae |
| 127 | Oncheonjang | 온천장 (우리들병원) | 溫泉場 | | 1.0 | 33.1 | Dongnae |
| 128 | Pusan Nat'l Univ. | 부산대 | 釜山大 | | 1.1 | 34.2 | Geumjeong |
| 129 | Jangjeon | 장전 (부산가톨릭대학교) | 長箭 | | 1.0 | 35.2 | Geumjeong |
| 130 | Guseo | 구서 | 久瑞 | | 1.1 | 36.3 | Geumjeong |
| 131 | Dusil | 두실 | 斗室 | | 1.0 | 37.3 | Geumjeong |
| 132 | Namsan | 남산 | 南山 | | 1.0 | 38.3 | Geumjeong |
| 133 | Beomeosa | 범어사 | 梵魚寺 | | 0.9 | 39.2 | Geumjeong |
| 134 | Nopo | 노포 (종합버스터미널) | 老圃 | | 1.2 | 40.4 | Geumjeong |
