= Nanpu =

Nanpu may refer to:

- Nanpū, limited express train service in Japan operated by JR Shikoku
- Nanpu Bridge, Bridge in Shanghai, China
- Nanpu Bridge station, station on Shanghai Metro Line 4
- Nanbu County in Sichuan, formerly romanized as Nanpu
- Nanpu Island, island in Panyu, Guangdong, China
- Nanpu Town, town in Quanzhou, Fujian, China

== See also ==
- Nampo (disambiguation)
