= Beomil station (Busan Metro) =

Station of the Busan Metro

117 범일 Beomil
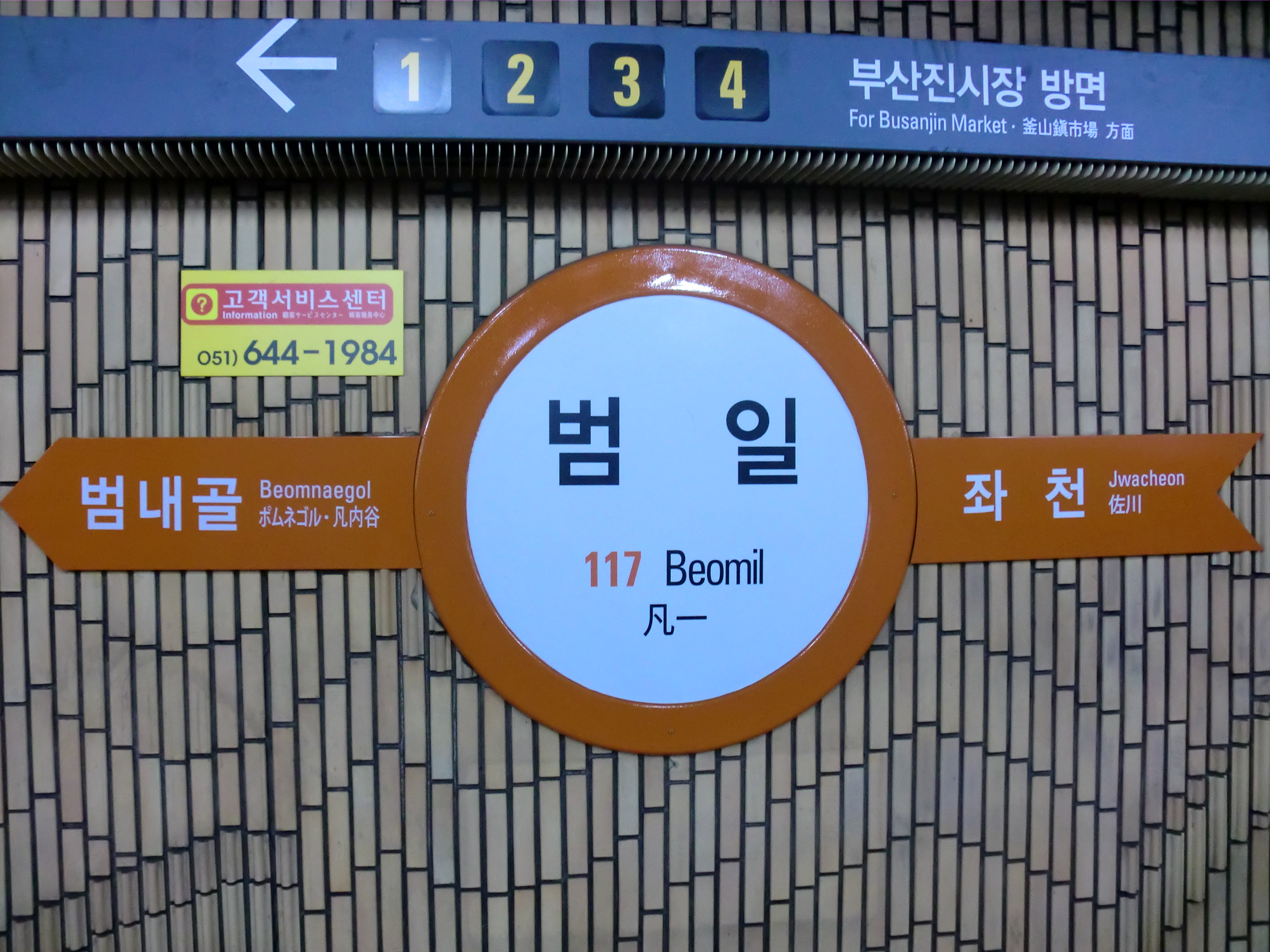

Korean name
- Hangul: 범일역
- Hanja: 凡一驛
- Revised Romanization: Beomil-yeok
- McCune–Reischauer: Pŏmil-yŏk

General information
- Location: Beomil-dong, Dong District, Busan; South Korea
- Coordinates: 35°08′29″N 129°03′34″E
- Operator: Busan Transportation Corporation
- Line: Busan Metro Line 1
- Platforms: 2
- Tracks: 2

Construction
- Structure type: Underground

Other information
- Station code: 117

History
- Opened: May 15, 1987; 39 years ago

Services
Preceding station	Busan Metro	Following station
Jwacheon towards Dadaepo Beach	Line 1	Beomnaegol towards Nopo
Location

Beomil Station (Korean: 범일역; Hanja: 凡一驛) is a station of the Busan Metro Line 1 in Beomil-dong, Dong District, Busan, South Korea. The station is unrelated to the Beomil Station of Korail.
