= Beomil station (Korail) =

Metro station in Busan, South Korea

범일
Beomil
- Beomil station (Korail)

Korean name
- Hangul: 범일역
- Hanja: 凡一驛
- Revised Romanization: Beomil-yeok
- McCune–Reischauer: Pŏmil-yŏk

General information
- Location: Beomcheon-dong, Busanjin District, Busan; South Korea
- Coordinates: 35.1451°N 129.0575°E
- Operator: Korail
- Line: Donghae Line

History
- Opened: April 2, 1943
Location

Beomil station (Korean: 범일역; Hanja: 凡一驛) is a railway station of the Donghae Line in Beomcheon-dong, Busanjin District, Busan, South Korea. The station is unrelated to the Beomil station of Busan Metro.
