= Nampo station (Busan Metro) =

Station of the Busan Metro

111 남포 (해동병원) Nampo (Haedong Hospital)
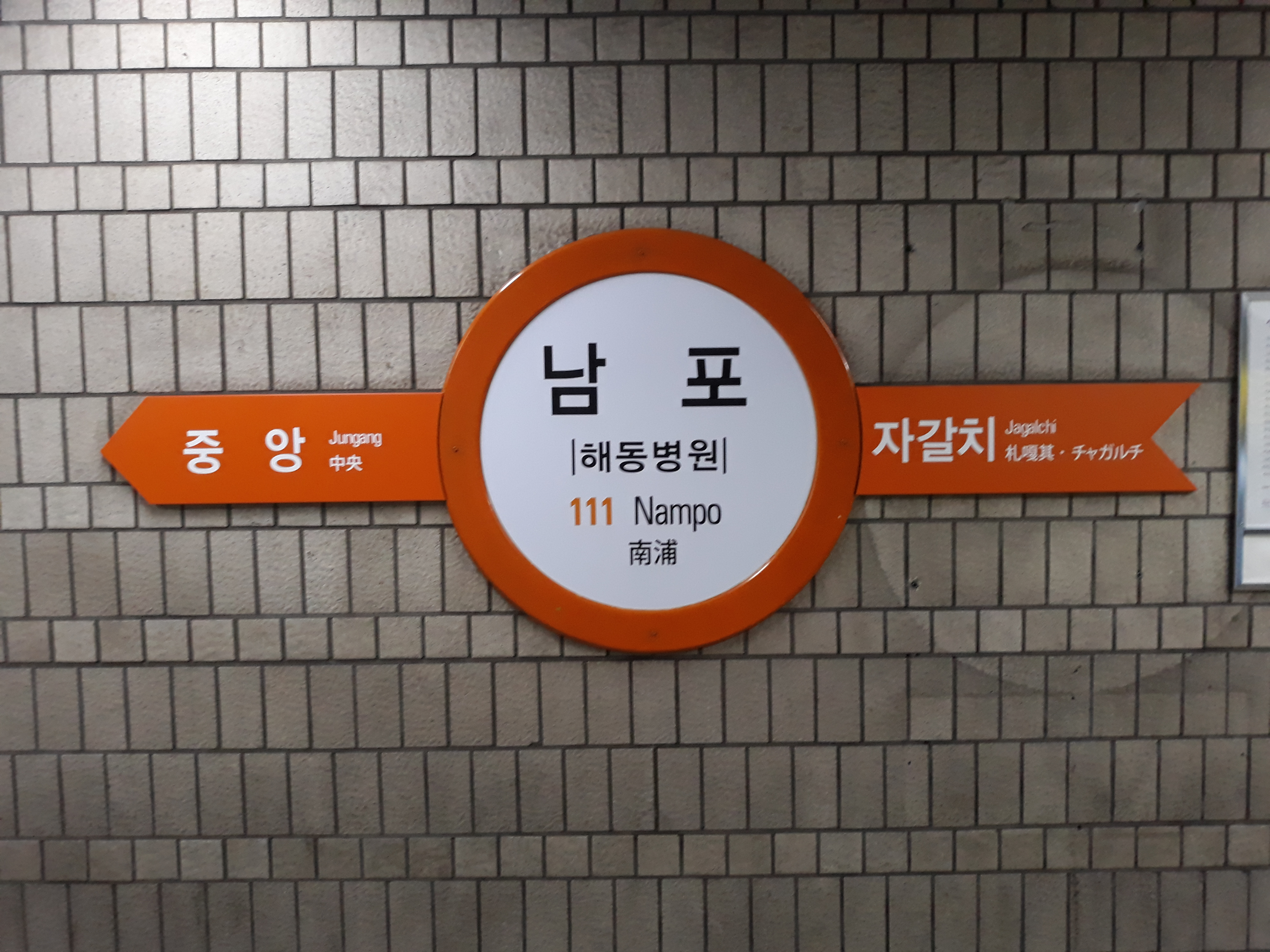

Korean name
- Hangul: 남포역
- Hanja: 南浦驛
- Revised Romanization: Nampoyeok
- McCune–Reischauer: Namp'oyŏk

General information
- Location: Nampo-dong, Jung District, Busan; South Korea
- Coordinates: 35.097883°N 129.034663°E
- Operator: Busan Transportation Corporation
- Line: Busan Metro Line 1
- Platforms: 2
- Tracks: 2

Construction
- Structure type: Underground

Other information
- Station code: 111

History
- Opened: May 19, 1988; 38 years ago

Services
| Preceding station | Busan Metro | Following station |
|---|---|---|
| Jagalchi towards Dadaepo Beach | Line 1 | Jungang towards Nopo |
Location

Nampo Station (a.k.a. Nampodong Station) is a station of Busan Metro Line 1 in Nampo-dong, Jung District, Busan, South Korea.
