= Jagalchi Market =

Largest fish market in South Korea

Coordinates: 35°05′48″N 129°01′48″E

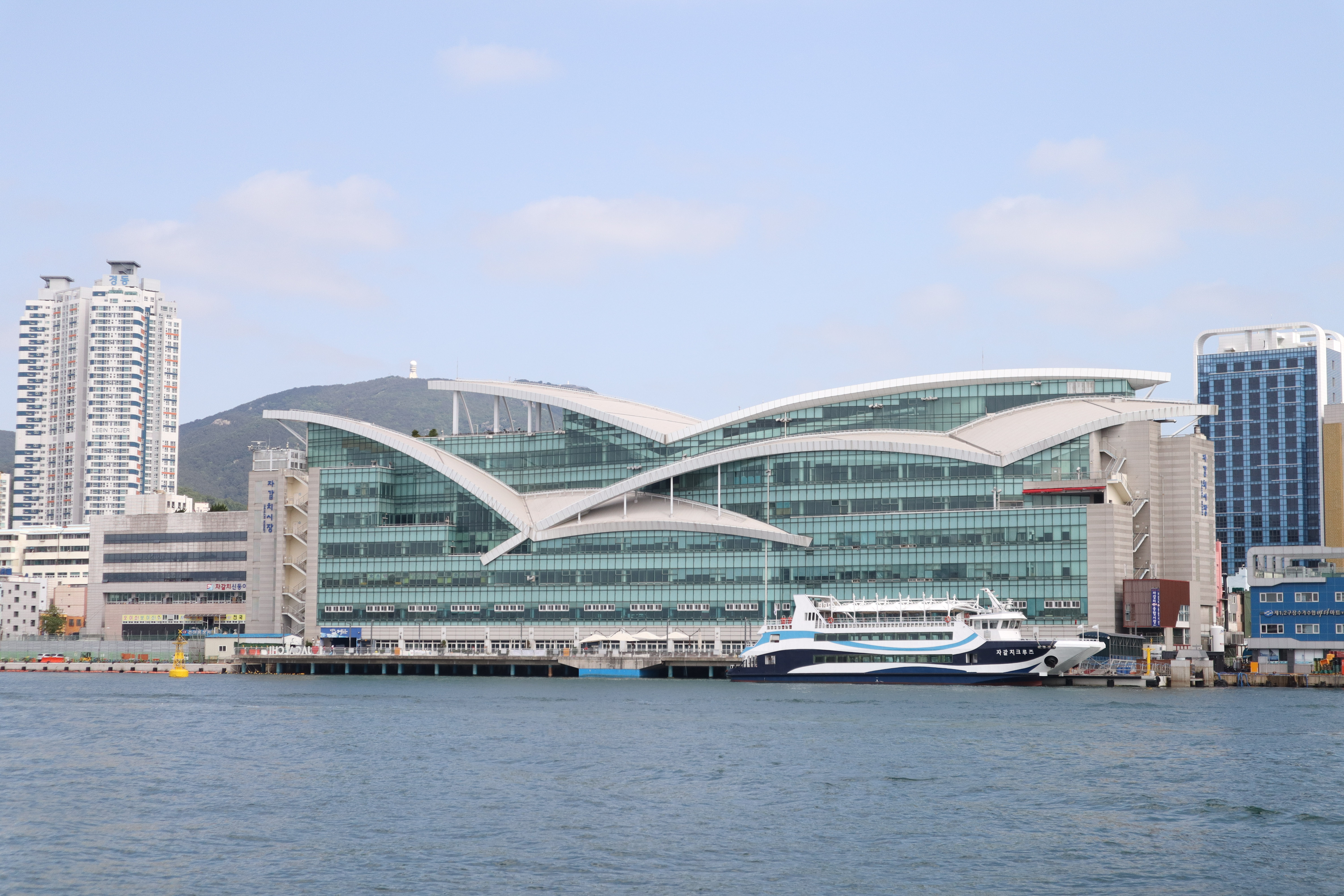
- Market main building in 2020
- Address: 52 Jagalchihaean-ro, Jung District, Busan, South Korea
- Parking: Underground
- Website: www.bisco.or.kr/jagalchimarket/ (in Korean)

Korean name
- Hangul: 자갈치시장
- Hanja: 자갈치市場
- RR: Jagalchi sijang
- MR: Chagalch'i sijang

Jagalchi Fish Market (Korean: 자갈치시장) is a fish market in Busan, South Korea. The market is located on the edge of Nampo Port (남포항), Busan. It is considered to be the largest fish market in South Korea.

The name is said to have originated from jagal (자갈; lit. 'gravel') because the market used to be surrounded by gravel. This is one of the ten landmarks of Busan, so many tourists visit there to shop.

Various goods can be found in this market, which spans 3 kilometers. Near the Yeongdo Grand Bridge, one can find dehydrated anchovies, sea laver, and various shellfish. Across from the city hall, shops sell herbal medicine and animal-based remedies. The market is known for their female vendors, who are called "Jagalchi Ajumma". The term dates back to the post-Korean War, when women would sell goods on the street in this area.

The market hosts the Busan Jagalchi Festival in autumn. The festival's slogan is "Oiso! Boiso! Saiso!" ("Come! See! Buy!"). Individuals can participate in singing, dancing, catching fish, and eating fresh fish.

There are two floors of underground parking.

== Gallery ==
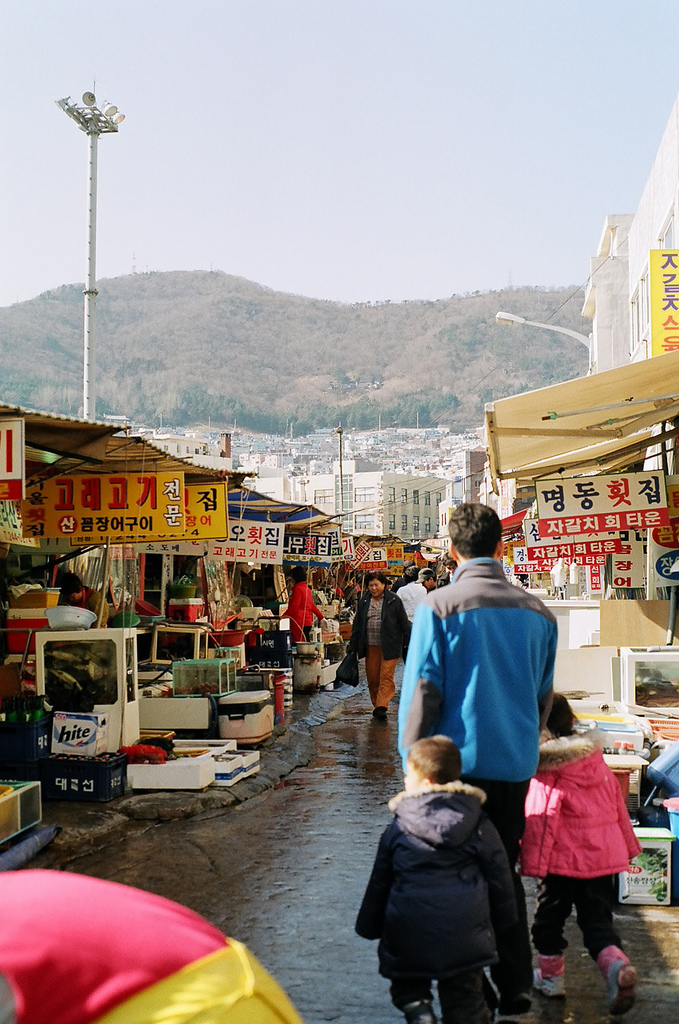
Hoe (Korean raw fish dish) restaurants in the market

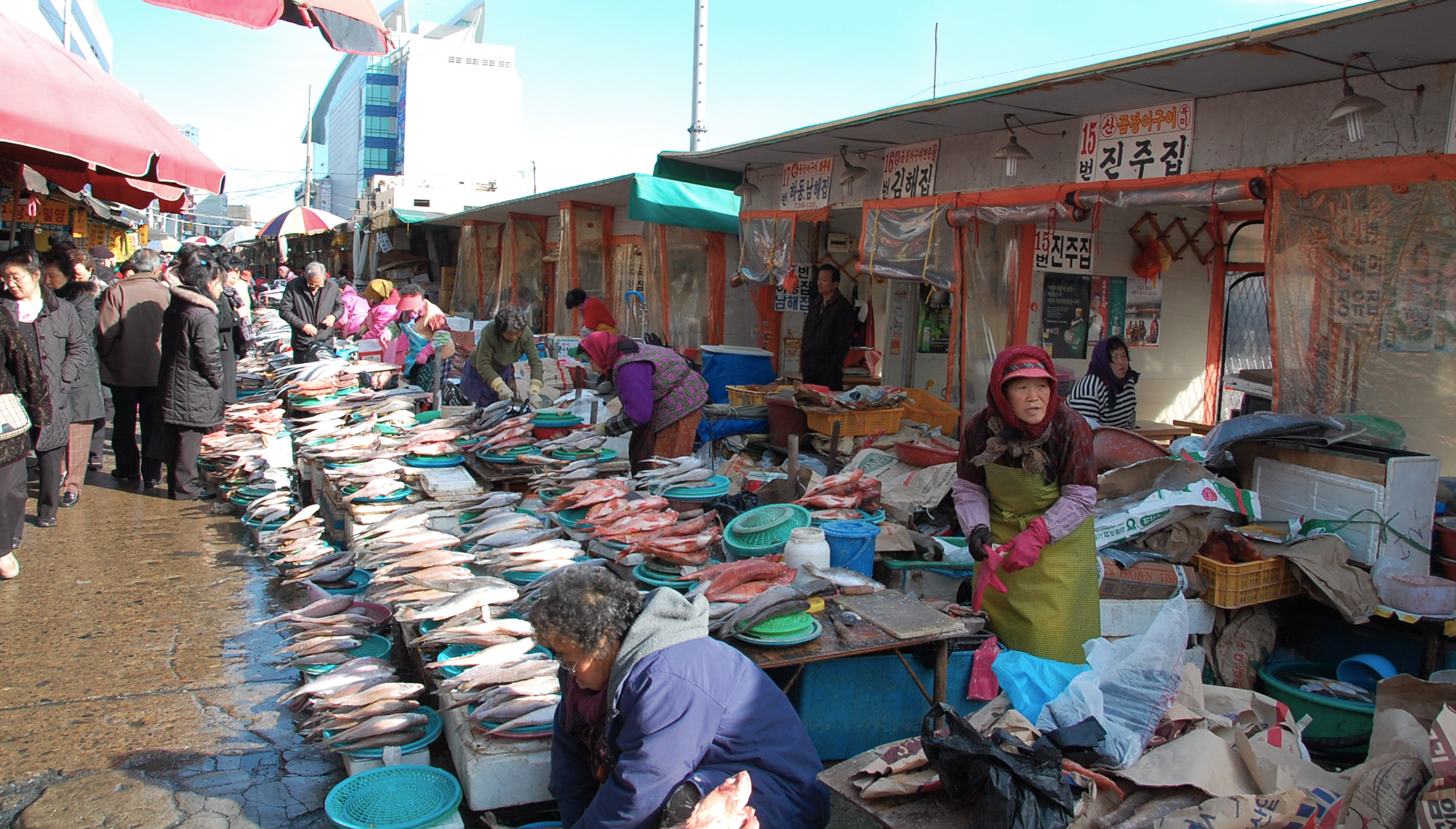

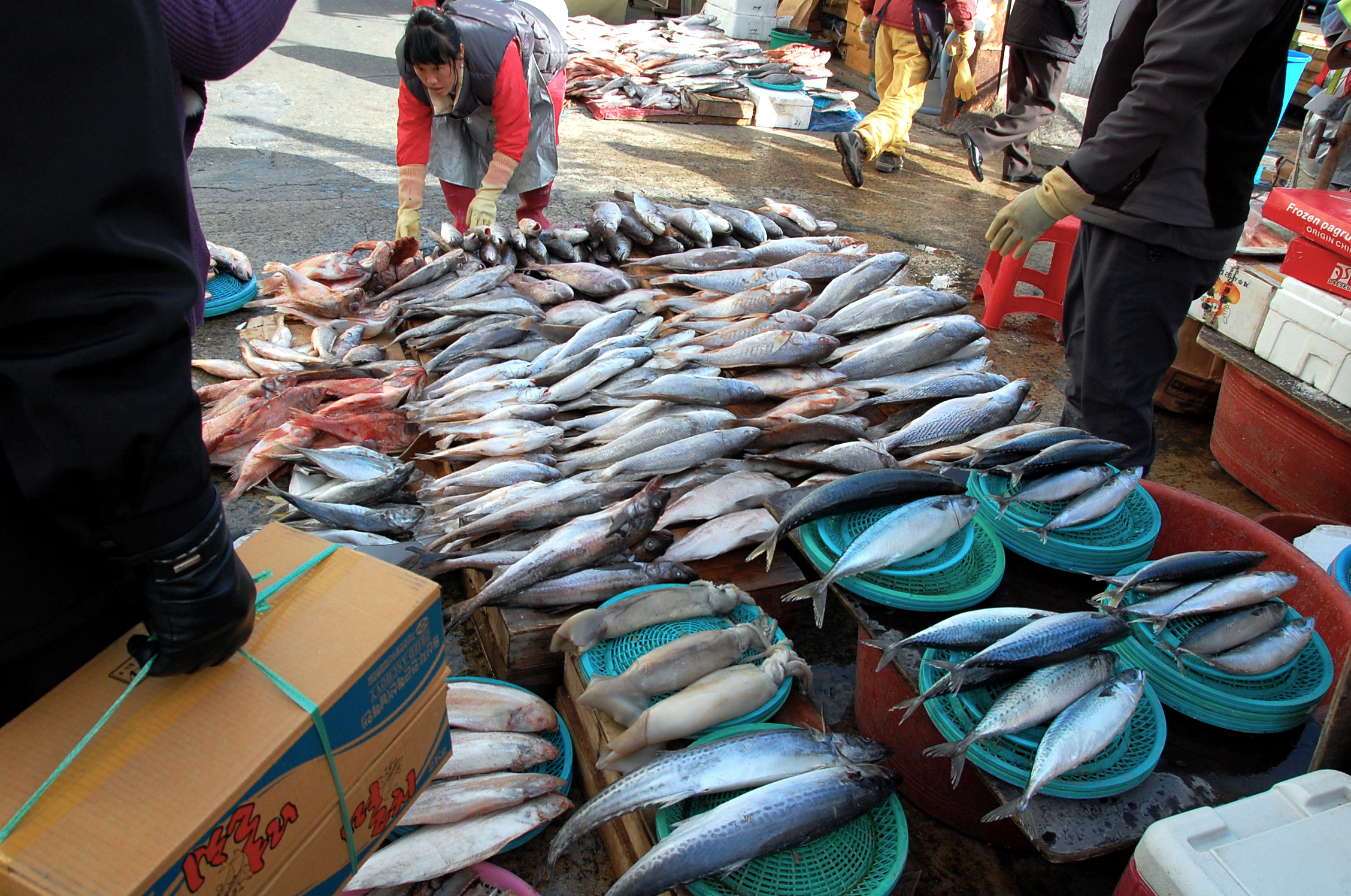
Jagalchi Fish Market

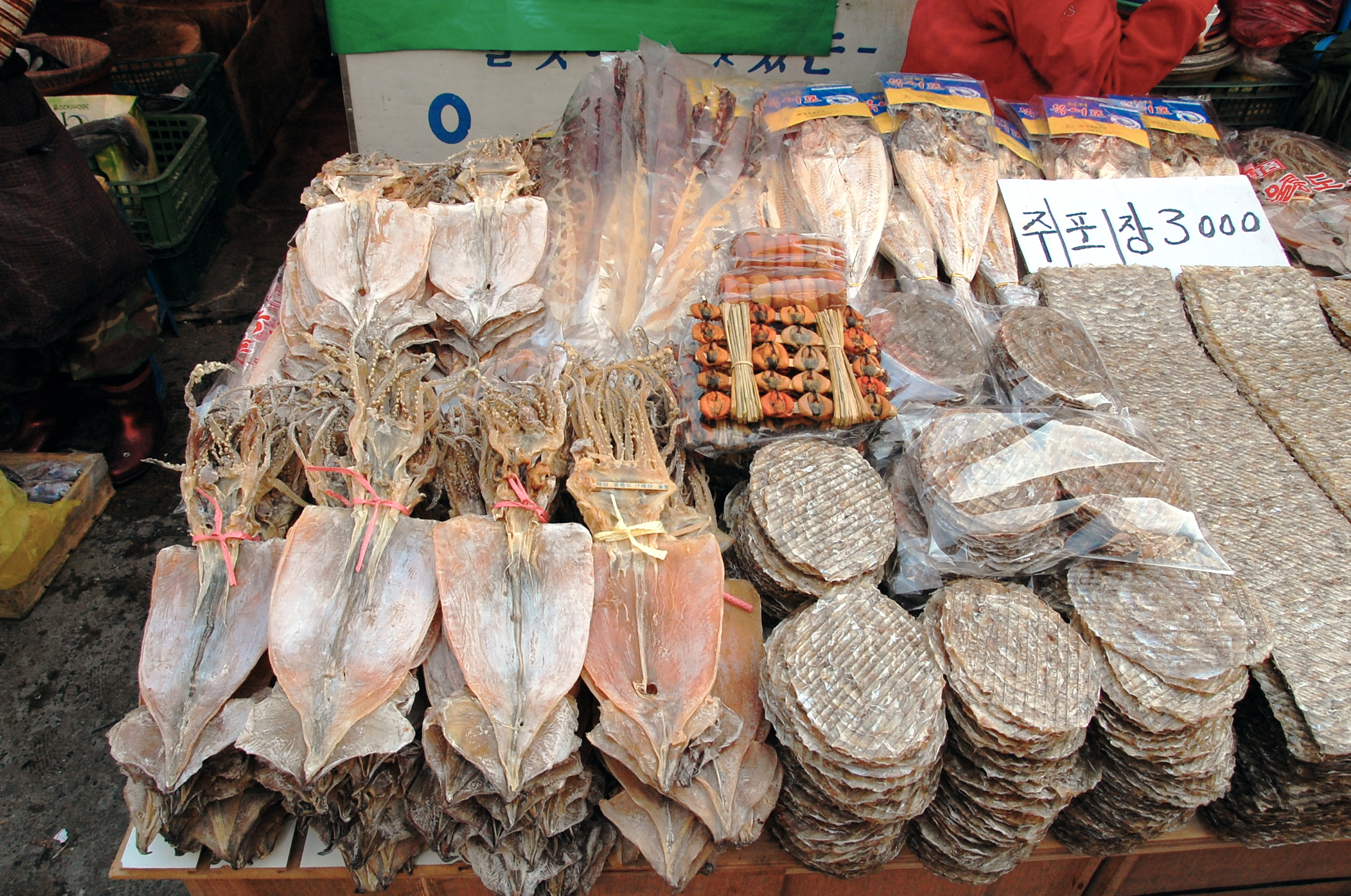
Dried seafood

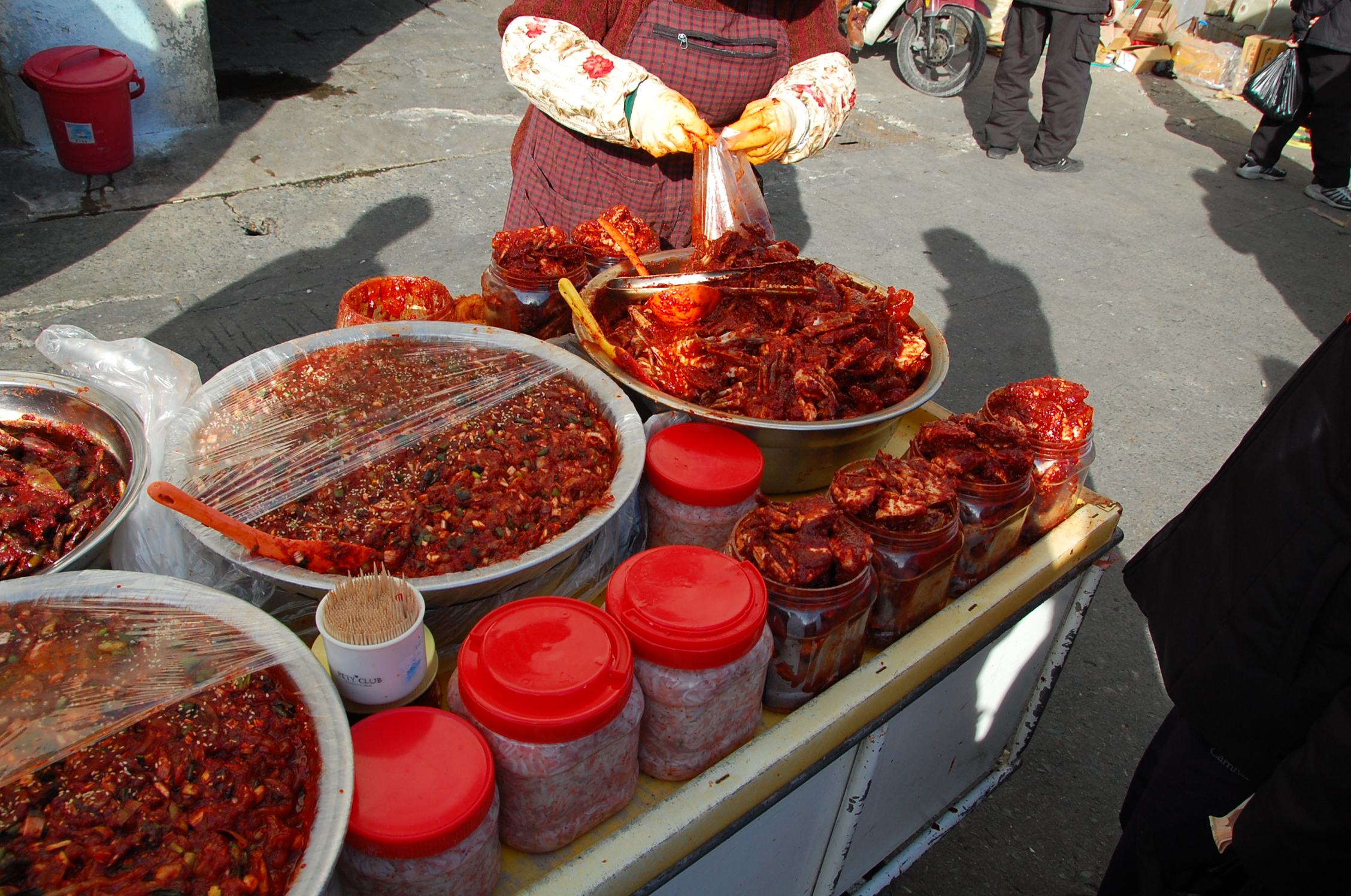
Food stall selling yangnyeom gejang (양념게장), marinated crabs in gochujang sauce (Korean chili pepper condiment).

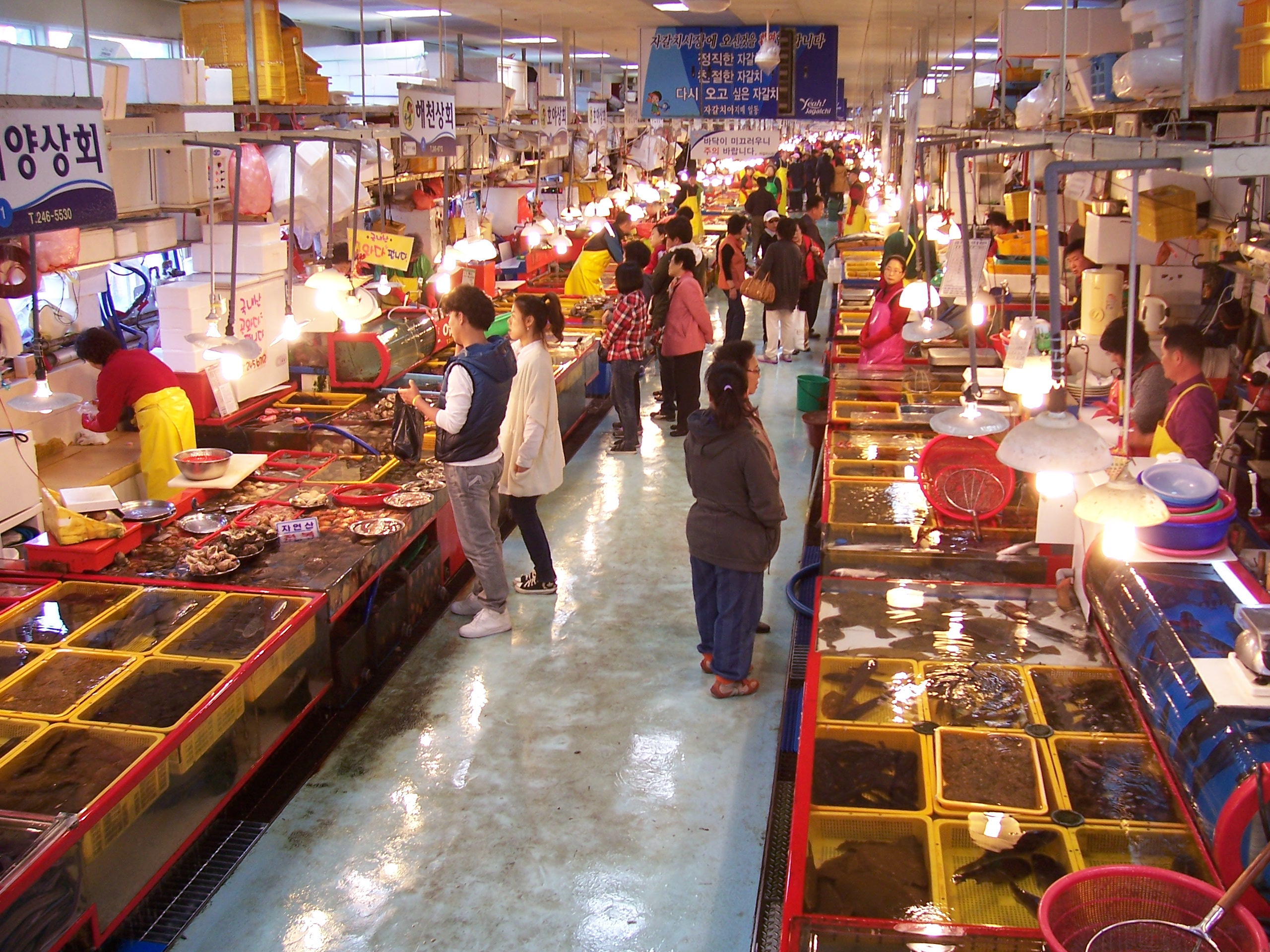

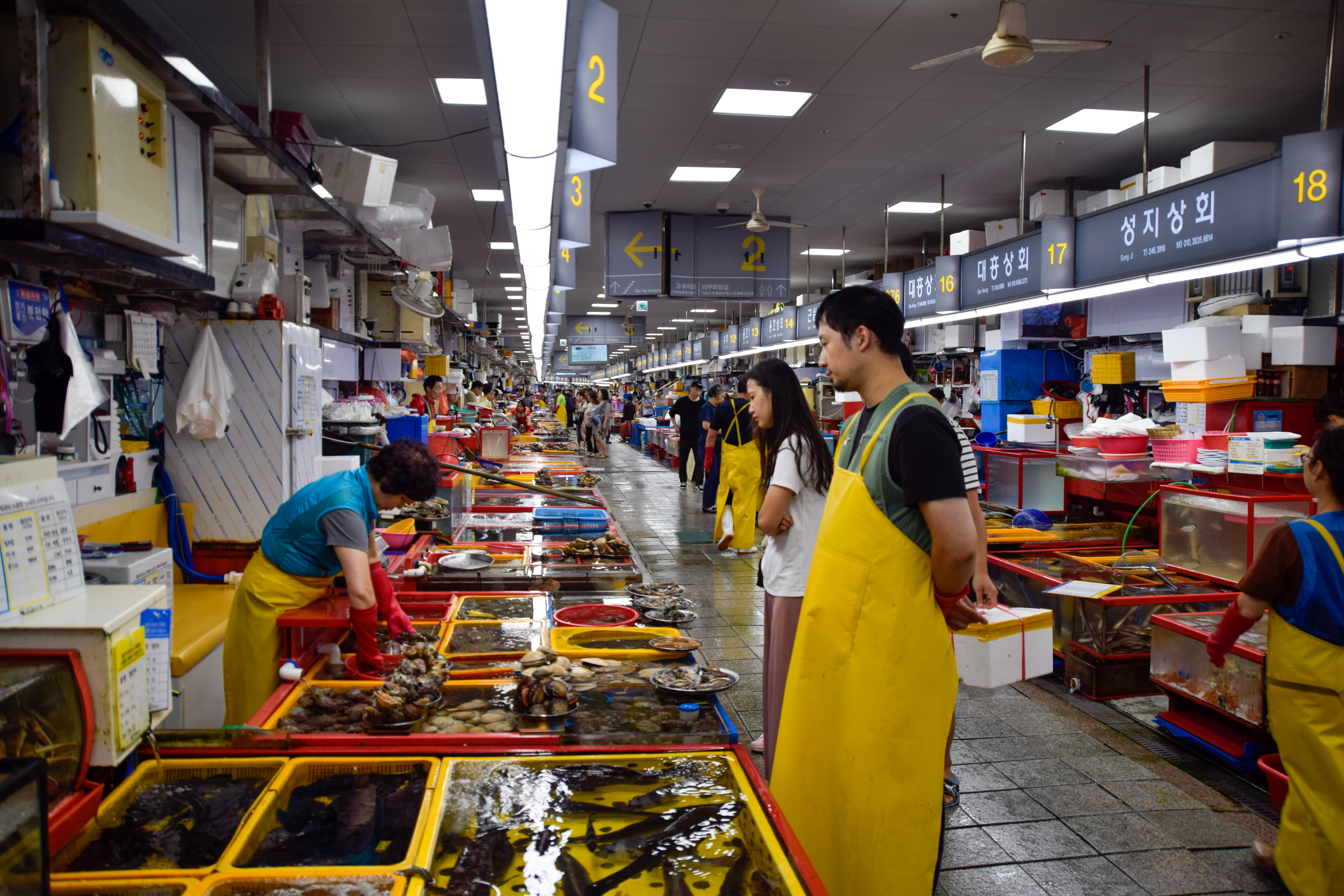

== See also ==
- List of markets in South Korea
- List of South Korean tourist attractions
- Busanjin Market
