= Nopo station =

Station of the Busan Metro

134 노포 (종합버스터미널) Nopo (General Bus Terminal)
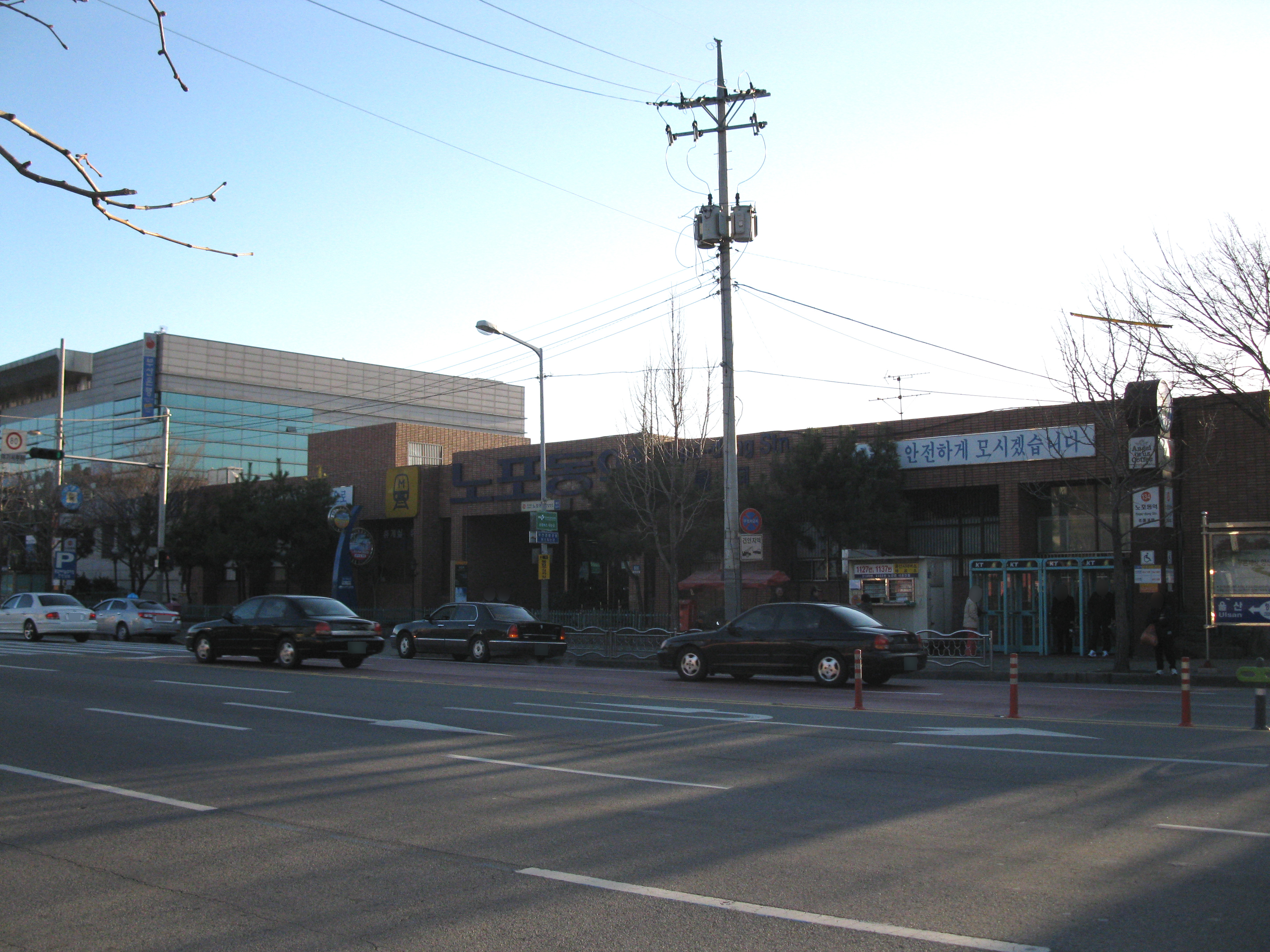

Korean name
- Hangul: 노포역
- Hanja: 老圃驛
- Revised Romanization: nopoyeok
- McCune–Reischauer: nopoyŏk

General information
- Location: Nopo-dong, Geumjeong District, Busan; South Korea
- Coordinates: 35°17′1″N 129°5′42″E
- Operator: Busan Transportation Corporation
- Line: Line 1
- Platforms: 2
- Tracks: 2

Construction
- Structure type: On ground
- Accessible: yes

Other information
- Station code: 134

History
- Opened: December 19, 1986; 39 years ago
- Former names: Nopo-dong

Services
| Preceding station | Busan Metro | Following station |
|---|---|---|
| Beomeosa towards Dadaepo Beach | Line 1 | Terminus |
Location

Nopo Station is a station of Busan Metro Line 1 and Yangsan Metro located in Nopo-dong, Geumjeong District, Busan, South Korea. The subname in parentheses is General Bus Terminal.

== Station layout ==
| G | Street level | Exit |

| L1; Concourse | Lobby | Customer service, shops, vending machines, ATMs |

| L2; Platforms | Side platform, doors will open on the right |
| L2; Platforms | Southbound | ← Line 1 toward Dadaepo Beach (Beomeosa) |
| L2; Platforms | Northbound | Line 1 Alighting passengers only→ |
| L2; Platforms | Side platform, doors will open on the right |
