= List of Busan Metro stations =

Busan Metro lines and stations

There are currently 114 stations on South Korea's Busan Metro core network operated by the Busan Transportation Corporation (HuMetro). Line 1, the first section to open, began operation on July 19, 1985, between Nopo-dong and Beomnaegol. As of 2025, the core network extends 116.5 km (72.4 mi) and consists of four lines; these intersect at several points, with Seomyeon Station serving as the primary crossing for Lines 1 and 2 in central Busan.

== Stations ==
=== Line 1 ===
Station Number	Station name			Transfer	Distance in km	Total distance	Location
Station Number	English	Hangul	Hanja	Transfer	Distance in km	Total distance	Location
095	Dadaepo Beach (Morundae)	다대포해수욕장 (몰운대)	多大浦海水浴場 (沒雲臺)		-	0.0	Saha
096	Dadaepo Harbor	다대포항	多大浦港		1.6	1.6	Saha
097	Natgae	낫개	낫개		1.3	2.9	Saha
098	Sinjangnim	신장림	新長林		0.8	3.7	Saha
099	Jangnim	장림	長林		1.1	4.8	Saha
100	Dongmae	동매	동매		1.5	6.3	Saha
101	Sinpyeong	신평	新平		1.6	7.9	Saha
102	Hadan	하단	下端		1.6	9.5	Saha
103	Dangni	당리 (사하구청)	堂里		0.8	10.3	Saha
104	Saha	사하	沙下		0.9	11.2	Saha
105	Goejeong	괴정	槐亭		0.9	12.1	Saha
106	Daeti	대티 (동주대학)	大峙		0.8	12.9	Saha
107	Seodaesin	서대신	西大新		1.4	14.3	Seo
108	Dongdaesin	동대신	東大新		0.7	15.0	Seo
109	Toseong	토성	土城		1.2	16.2	Seo
110	Jagalchi	자갈치	자갈치		1.0	17.2	Jung
111	Nampo	남포	南浦		0.7	17.9	Jung
112	Jungang	중앙 (그린손해보험)	中央		0.9	18.8	Jung
113	Busan Station	부산역	釜山驛	Gyeongbu; Gyeongbu HSR Saemaeul-ho services Mugunghwa-ho services	1.1	19.9	Dong
114	Choryang	초량	草梁		0.8	20.7	Dong
115	Busanjin	부산진	釜山鎮	Saemaeul-ho services Mugunghwa-ho services	0.8	21.5	Dong
116	Jwacheon	좌천 (일산기독병원)	佐川		1.0	22.5	Dong
117	Beomil	범일	凡一		0.9	23.4	Dong
118	Beomnaegol	범내골	범내골		0.8	24.2	Busanjin
119	Seomyeon	서면	西面	Busan Metro Line 2	1.2	25.4	Busanjin
120	Bujeon	부전	釜田	Saemaeul-ho services Mugunghwa-ho services	0.6	26.0	Busanjin
121	Yangjeong	양정 (동의과학대학·부산여자대학)	楊亭		1.4	27.4	Busanjin
122	City Hall	시청 (연제)	市廳		0.8	28.2	Yeonje
123	Yeonsan	연산	蓮山	Busan Metro Line 3	0.9	29.1	Yeonje
124	Busan Nat'l Univ. of Edu.	교대	敎育大	Donghae Line	1.0	30.1	Yeonje
125	Dongnae	동래	東萊	Busan Metro Line 4	1.2	31.3	Dongnae
126	Myeongnyun	명륜	明倫		0.8	32.1	Dongnae
127	Oncheonjang	온천장 (우리들병원)	溫泉場		1.0	33.1	Dongnae
128	Pusan Nat'l Univ.	부산대	釜山大		1.1	34.2	Geumjeong
129	Jangjeon	장전 (부산가톨릭대학교)	長箭		1.0	35.2	Geumjeong
130	Guseo	구서	久瑞		1.1	36.3	Geumjeong
131	Dusil	두실	斗室		1.0	37.3	Geumjeong
132	Namsan	남산	南山		1.0	38.3	Geumjeong
133	Beomeosa	범어사	梵魚寺		0.9	39.2	Geumjeong
134	Nopo	노포 (종합버스터미널)	老圃		1.2	40.4	Geumjeong

=== Line 2 ===
Station Number	Station name English	Station name Hangul	Station name Hanja	Transfer	Distance in km	Total distance	Location	
201	Jangsan	장산 (해운대 백병원)	萇山		---	0.0	Busan	Haeundae
202	Jung-dong	중동	中洞		0.9	0.9	Busan	Haeundae
203	Haeundae	해운대	海雲臺		0.9	1.8	Busan	Haeundae
204	Dongbaek	동백	冬栢		1.2	3.0	Busan	Haeundae
205	BEXCO	벡스코	벡스코	Donghae Line	1.1	4.1	Busan	Haeundae
206	Centum City	센텀시티 (벡스코·신세계)	센텀시티		0.8	4.9	Busan	Haeundae
207	Millak	민락	民樂		1.0	5.9	Busan	Suyeong
208	Suyeong	수영	水營	Busan Metro Line 3	0.9	6.8	Busan	Suyeong
209	Gwangan	광안	廣安		0.9	7.7	Busan	Suyeong
210	Geumnyeonsan	금련산 (좋은강안병원)	金蓮山		0.9	8.6	Busan	Suyeong
211	Namcheon	남천 (KBS∙수영구청)	南川		0.9	9.5	Busan	Suyeong
212	Kyunsung Univ. · Pukyong Nat'l Univ.	경성대·부경대 (동명대학교)	慶星大·釜慶大		0.8	10.3	Busan	Nam
213	Daeyeon	대연 (고려병원)	大淵		0.9	11.2	Busan	Nam
214	Motgol	못골 (남구청)	池谷		0.7	11.9	Busan	Nam
215	Jigegol	지게골	支架谷		0.9	12.8	Busan	Nam
216	Munhyeon	문현	門峴		0.8	13.6	Busan	Nam
217	Busan International Finance Center·Busan Bank	국제금융센터·부산은행	國際金融센터·釜山銀行		0.8	14.4	Busan	Nam
218	Jeonpo	전포	田浦		0.8	15.2	Busan	Busanjin
219	Seomyeon	서면	西面	Busan Metro Line 1	1.1	16.3	Busan	Busanjin
220	Buam	부암 (온 종합병원)	釜岩		0.8	17.1	Busan	Busanjin
221	Gaya	가야	伽倻		0.7	17.8	Busan	Busanjin
222	Dong-eui Univ.	동의대	東義大		0.9	18.7	Busan	Busanjin
223	Gaegeum	개금	開琴		1.1	19.8	Busan	Busanjin
224	Naengjeong	냉정	冷亭		0.8	20.6	Busan	Sasang
225	Jurye	주례	周礼		0.9	21.5	Busan	Sasang
226	Gamjeon	감전 (사상구청)	甘田		1.2	22.7	Busan	Sasang
227	Sasang	사상 (서부터미널)	沙上	Busan–Gimhae Light Rail Transit	1.1	23.8	Busan	Sasang
228	Deokpo	덕포	德浦		1.2	25.0	Busan	Sasang
229	Modeok	모덕	毛德		1.0	25.8	Busan	Sasang
230	Mora	모라	毛羅		1.0	26.8	Busan	Sasang
231	Gunam	구남	亀南		1.1	27.9	Busan	Buk
232	Gumyeong	구명	亀明		0.7	28.6	Busan	Buk
233	Deokcheon	덕천 (부산과기대)	德川	Busan Metro Line 3	1.2	29.8	Busan	Buk
234	Sujeong	수정 (방송통신대)	水亭		1.5	31.3	Busan	Buk
235	Hwamyeong	화명	華明		1.5	32.8	Busan	Buk
236	Yulli	율리	栗里		1.2	34.0	Busan	Buk
237	Dongwon	동원	東院		1.5	35.5	Busan	Buk
238	Geumgok	금곡	金谷		1.0	36.5	Busan	Buk
239	Hopo	호포	湖浦		1.5	38.0	South Gyeongsang	Yangsan
240	Jeungsan	증산	甑山		3.5	41.5	South Gyeongsang	Yangsan
241	Pusan Nat'l Univ. Yangsan Campus	부산대양산캠퍼스	釜山大梁山캠퍼스		1.0	42.5	South Gyeongsang	Yangsan
242	Namyangsan	남양산 (범어)	南梁山		1.1	43.6	South Gyeongsang	Yangsan
243	Yangsan	양산 (시청·양산대학)	梁山		1.6	45.2	South Gyeongsang	Yangsan

=== Line 3 ===
Station Number	Station name English	Station name Hangul	Station name Hanja	Transfer	Distance in km	Total distance	Location
301	Suyeong	수영	水營	Busan Metro Line 2	---	0.0	Suyeong
302	Mangmi	망미 (병무청)	望美		1.0	1.0	Suyeong
303	Baesan	배산	盃山		1.2	2.2	Yeonje
304	Mulmangol	물만골	물만골		1.1	3.3	Yeonje
305	Yeonsan	연산	蓮山	Busan Metro Line 1	1.1	4.4	Yeonje
306	Geoje	거제	巨堤	Donghae Line	0.7	5.1	Yeonje
307	Sports Complex	종합운동장 (빅토리움)	綜合運動場		0.7	5.8	Yeonje
308	Sajik	사직	社稷		0.8	6.6	Dongnae
309	Minam	미남	美南	Busan Metro Line 4	0.8	7.4	Dongnae
310	Mandeok	만덕	萬德		3.3	10.7	Buk
311	Namsanjeong	남산정 (부산폴리텍대학)	南山亭		1.1	11.8	Buk
312	Sukdeung	숙등 (부민병원)	淑嶝		1.0	12.8	Buk
313	Deokcheon	덕천 (부산과기대)	德川	Busan Metro Line 2	0.7	13.5	Buk
314	Gupo	구포	龜浦	Gyeongbu High Speed Railway ITX-Saemaeul services Mugunghwa-ho services	1.1	14.6	Buk
315	Gangseo-gu Office	강서구청	江西區廳		1.6	16.2	Gangseo
316	Sports Park	체육공원	體育公園		1.1	17.3	Gangseo
317	Daejeo	대저	大猪	Busan–Gimhae Light Rail Transit	0.8	18.1	Gangseo

=== Line 4 ===
Station Number	Station name			Transfer	Distance in km	Total distance	Location
Station Number	English	Hangul	Hanja	Transfer	Distance in km	Total distance	Location
401	Minam	미남	美南	Busan Metro Line 3	---	0.0	Dongnae
402	Dongnae	동래	東萊	Busan Metro Line 1	1.0	1.0	Dongnae
403	Suan	수안 (동래읍성임진왜란역사관)	壽安 (東來邑城壬辰倭亂歷史館)		0.7	1.7	Dongnae
404	Nangmin	낙민	樂民		0.6	2.3	Dongnae
405	Chungnyeolsa	충렬사 (안락·부산항운병원)	忠烈祠 (安樂)		0.6	2.9	Dongnae
406	Myeongjang	명장	鳴藏		0.6	3.5	Dongnae
407	Seo-dong	서동	書洞		0.9	4.4	Geumjeong
408	Geumsa	금사	錦絲		0.6	5.0	Geumjeong
409	Banyeo Agricultural Market	반여농산물시장	盤如農産物市場		0.7	5.7	Haeundae
410	Seokdae	석대	石坮		1.1	6.8	Haeundae
411	Youngsan University	영산대 (아랫반송)	靈山大 (아랫盤松)		1.2	8.0	Haeundae
412	Witbansong	윗반송	윗盤松		1.3	9.3	Haeundae
413	Gochon	고촌	古村		0.6	9.9	Gijang
414	Anpyeong	안평 (고촌주택단지)	安平 (古村住宅團地)		0.9	10.8	Gijang
