= Witbansong station =

Station of the Busan Metro

412 윗반송 Witbansong
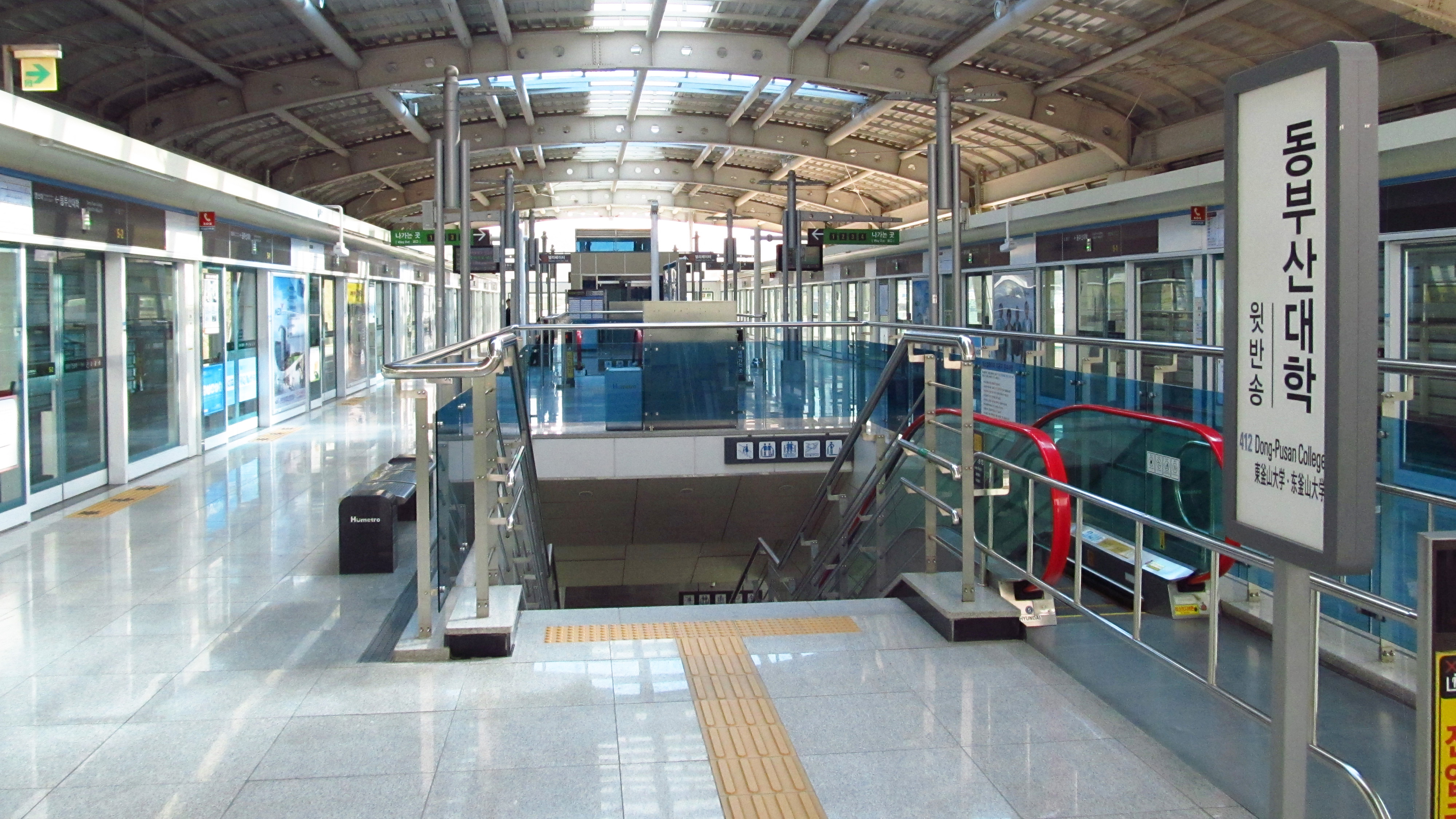

Korean name
- Hangul: 윗반송역
- Hanja: 윗盤松驛
- Revised Romanization: Witbansong-yeok
- McCune–Reischauer: Witpansong-yŏk

General information
- Location: Bansong-dong, Haeundae District, Busan; South Korea
- Coordinates: 35.2324°N 129.1538°E
- Operator: Busan Transportation Corporation
- Line: Line 4
- Platforms: 1
- Tracks: 2

Construction
- Structure type: Aboveground

Other information
- Station code: 412

History
- Opened: March 30, 2011
- Former names: Dong-Pusan College (2011–2020)

Services
Preceding station	Busan Metro	Following station
Youngsan University towards Minam	Line 4	Gochon towards Anpyeong
Location

Witbansong Station (Korean: 윗반송역; Hanja: 윗盤松驛) is a station of the Busan Metro Line 4 in Bansong-dong, Haeundae District, Busan, South Korea. The station name Dong-Pusan College which came from the nearby Dong-Pusan College was renamed to Witbansong which means the upper Bansong-dong on 1 January 2021 because Dong-Pusan College closed down in September 2020.

== Station Layout ==
L2; Platforms
L2; Platforms	Southbound	← Line 4 toward Minam (Youngsan University)
L2; Platforms	Island platform, doors will open on the left
L2; Platforms	Northbound	Line 4 toward Anpyeong (Gochon) →

L1; Concourse	Lobby	Customer Service, Shops, Vending machines, ATMs

G	Street level	Exit
