= Youngsan University station =

Station of the Busan Metro

411 영산대 (아랫반송) Youngsan Univ. (Araetbansong)
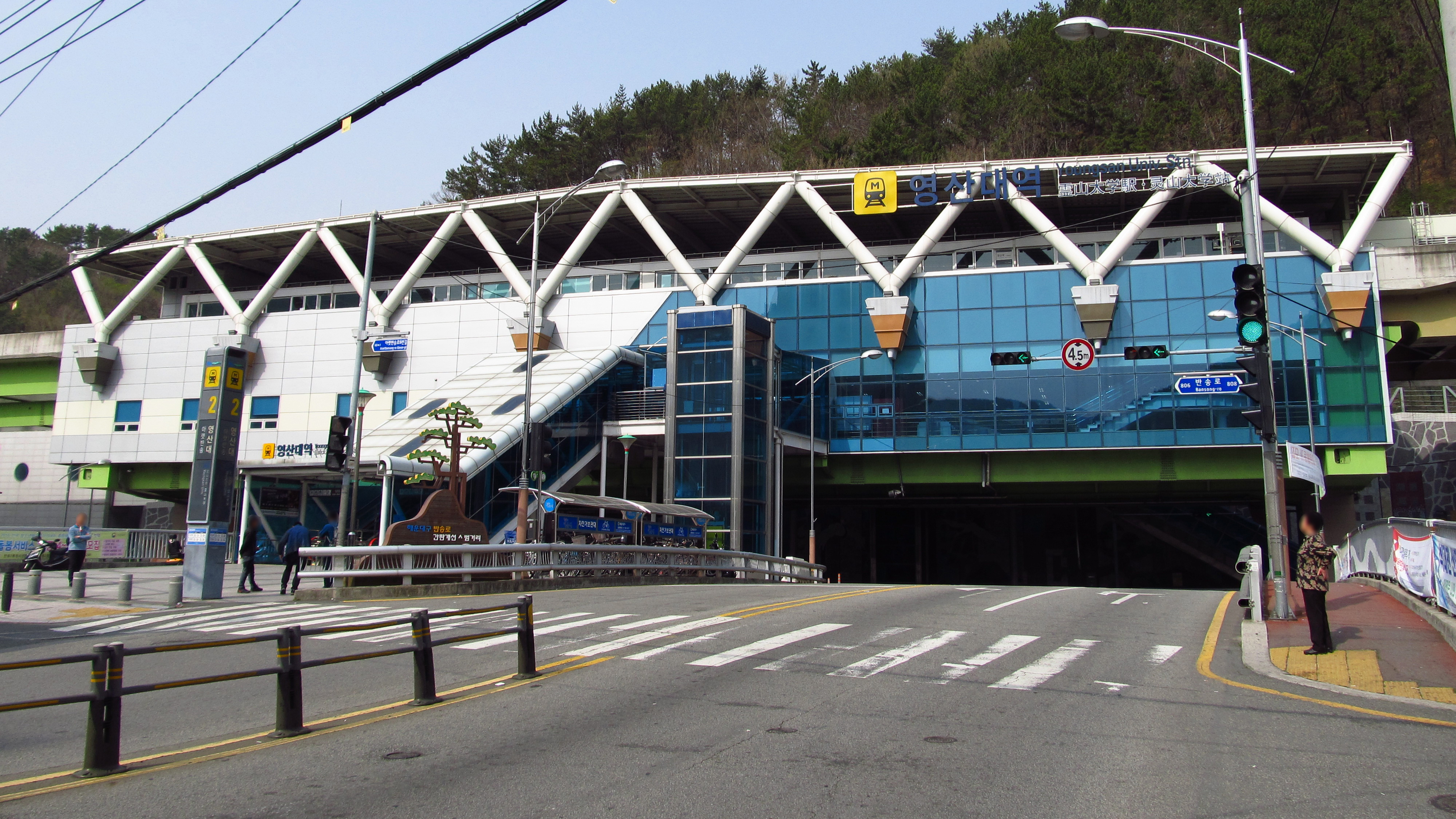

Korean name
- Hangul: 영산대역
- Hanja: 霊山大驛
- Revised Romanization: Yeongsandae yeok
- McCune–Reischauer: Yŏngsantae yŏk

General information
- Location: Bansong-dong, Haeundae District, Busan; South Korea
- Coordinates: 35.2256°N 129.1462°E
- Operator: Busan Transportation Corporation
- Line: Line 4
- Platforms: 1
- Tracks: 2

Construction
- Structure type: Aboveground

Other information
- Station code: 411

History
- Opened: March 30, 2011

Services
Preceding station	Busan Metro	Following station
Seokdae towards Minam	Line 4	Witbansong towards Anpyeong
Location

Youngsan University station (Korean: 영산대역; Hanja: 霊山大驛) is a station of Busan Metro Line 4 in Bansong-dong, Haeundae District, Busan, South Korea. The station name comes from the nearby Youngsan University.

== Station Layout ==
L2; Platforms
L2; Platforms	Southbound	← Line 4 toward Minam (Seokdae)
L2; Platforms	Island platform, doors will open on the left
L2; Platforms	Northbound	Line 4 toward Anpyeong (Witbansong) →

L1; Concourse	Lobby	Customer Service, Shops, Vending machines, ATMs

G	Street level	Exit

== Gallery ==
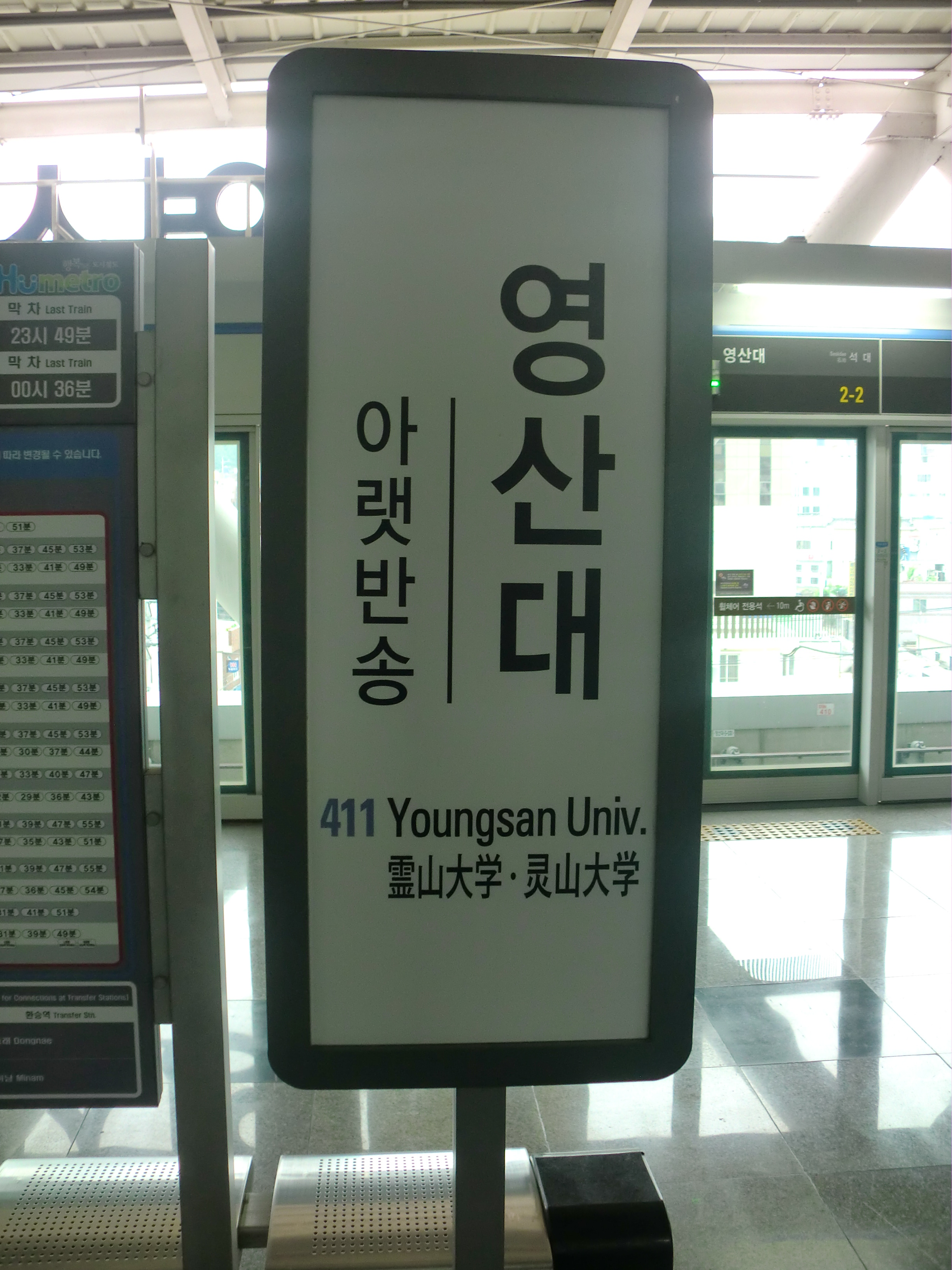
Youngsan University Station Sign

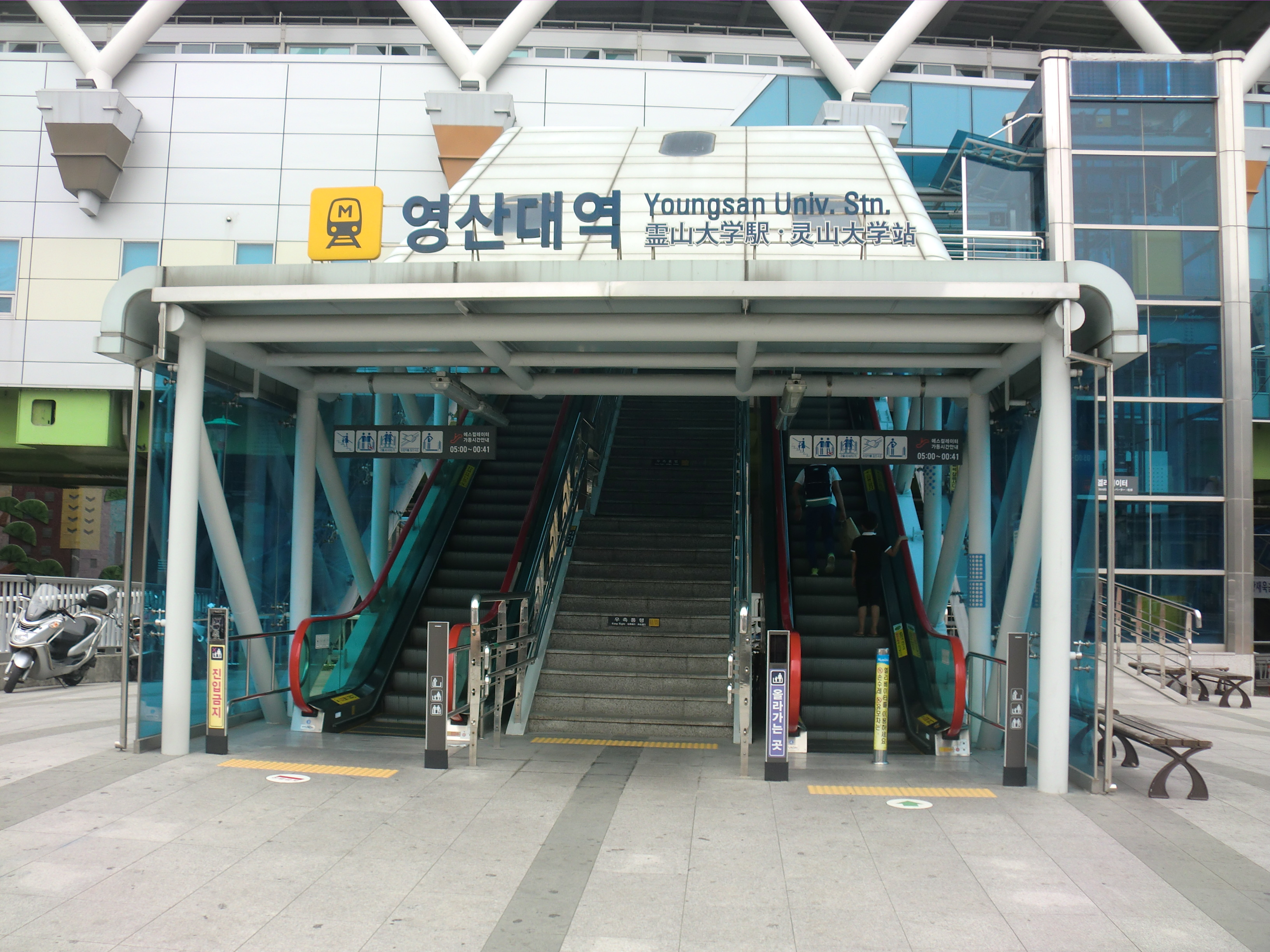
Youngsan University Station Entrance No. 4
