= Geumsa station =

Station of the Busan Metro

408 금사 Geumsa
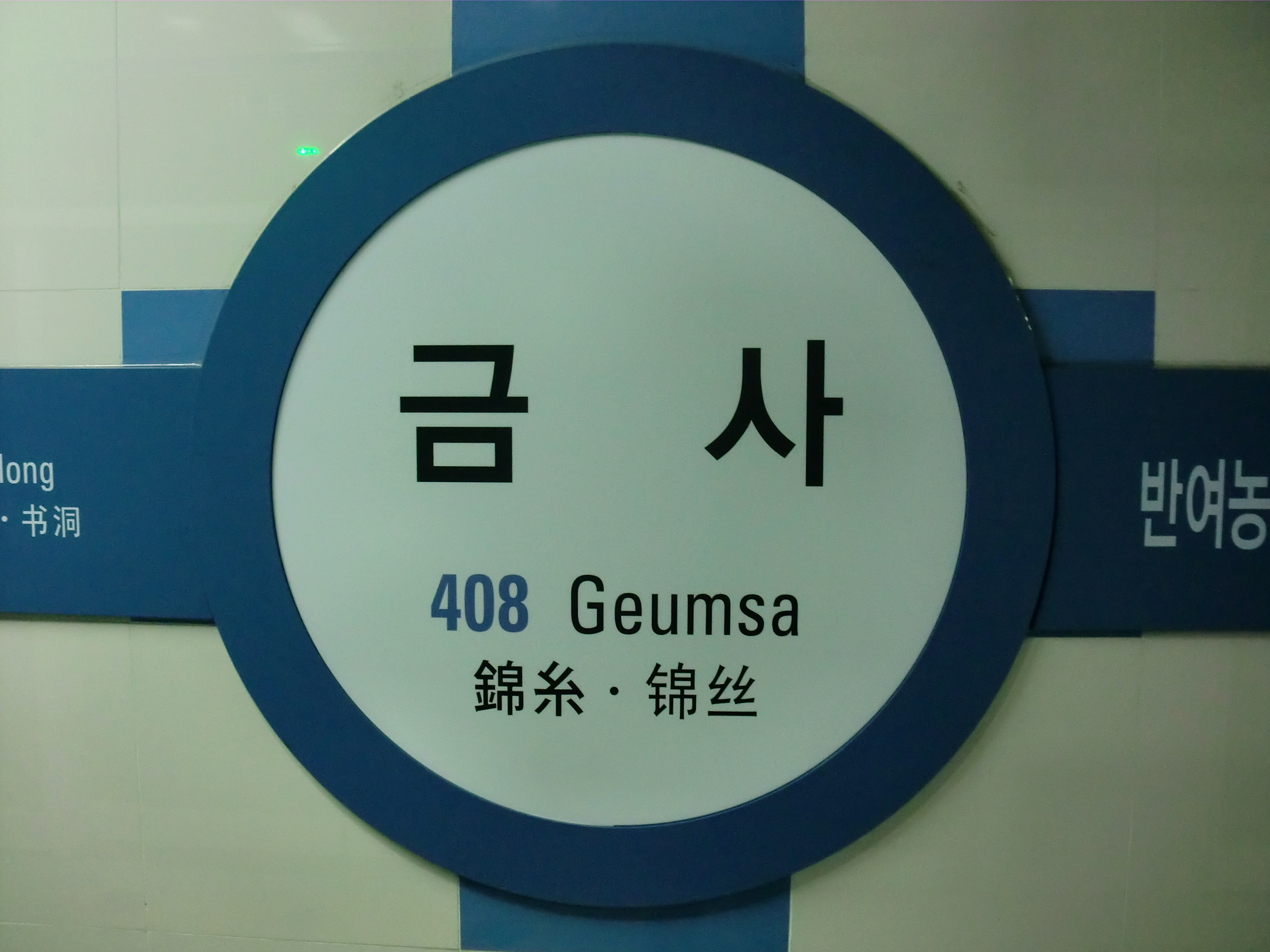

Korean name
- Hangul: 금사역
- Hanja: 錦絲驛
- Revised Romanization: Geumsa-yeok
- McCune–Reischauer: Kŭmsa-yŏk

General information
- Location: Geumsahoedong-dong, Geumjeong District, Busan; South Korea
- Coordinates: 35.2158°N 129.1152°E
- Operator: Busan Transportation Corporation
- Line: Line 4
- Platforms: 1
- Tracks: 2

Construction
- Structure type: Underground

Other information
- Station code: 408

History
- Opened: March 30, 2011

Services
Preceding station	Busan Metro	Following station
Seo-dong towards Minam	Line 4	Banyeo Agricultural Market towards Anpyeong
Location

Geumsa Station (Korean: 금사역) is an underground station of the Busan Metro Line 4 in Geumsahoedong-dong, Geumjeong District, Busan, South Korea.

== Station layout ==
G	Street level	Exit

L1; Concourse	Lobby	Customer Service, Shops, Vending machines, ATMs
L2; Platforms	Southbound	← Line 4 toward Minam (Seo-dong)
L2; Platforms	Island platform, doors open on the left
L2; Platforms	Northbound	Line 4 toward Anpyeong (Banyeo Agricultural Market) →

== Vicinity ==
- Exit 1: S-oil
- Exit 2:
- Exit 3: Geumjeong Furniture
- Exit 4: Geumsa Bus Stop
