= Suan station =

Station of the Busan Metro

403 수안 (동래읍성임진왜란역사관·힘찬병원) Suan (Dongnae-eup Seongimjin War History Museum·Himchan Hospital)
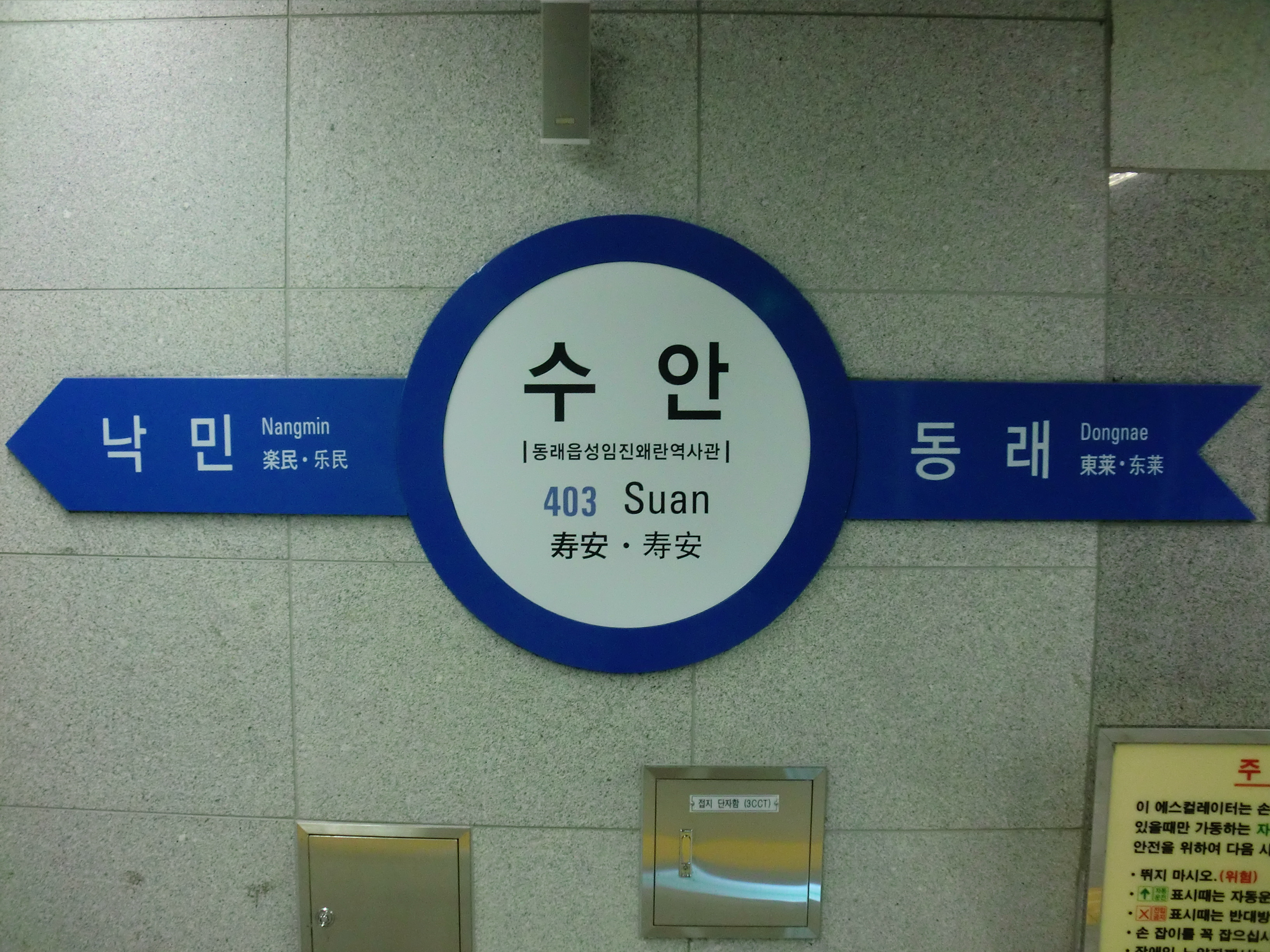

Korean name
- Hangul: 수안역
- Hanja: 壽安驛
- Revised Romanization: Suan yeok
- McCune–Reischauer: Suan yŏk

General information
- Location: Suan-dong, Dongnae District, Busan; South Korea
- Coordinates: 35.2017°N 129.0839°E
- Operator: Busan Transportation Corporation
- Line: Line 4
- Platforms: 2
- Tracks: 2

Construction
- Structure type: Underground

Other information
- Station code: 403

History
- Opened: March 30, 2011

Services
Preceding station	Busan Metro	Following station
Dongnae towards Minam	Line 4	Nangmin towards Anpyeong
Location

Suan Station (Korean: 수안역; Hanja: 壽安驛) is a station of Busan Metro Line 4 in Suan-dong, Dongnae District, Busan, South Korea.

This station features a museum to the Siege of Dongnae, one of the first battles of the Imjin War. Inside the museum is a scale model of Dongnaeeupsong as it was at that time, interactive activities, and artifacts found during the construction of the station.

== Station Layout ==
G	Street level	Exit

L1; Concourse	Lobby	Customer Service, Shops, Vending machines, ATMs

L2; Platforms	Side platform, doors will open on the right
L2; Platforms	Southbound	← Line 4 toward Minam (Dongnae)
L2; Platforms	Northbound	Line 4 toward Anpyeong (Nangmin)→
L2; Platforms	Side platform, doors will open on the right

== Vicinity ==
- Exit 1: Kanada Dental Clinic
- Exit 2: Korean BBQ
- Exit 3: Kanada Dental Clinic
- Exit 4: Shinhan Bank Dongrae Central Branch
- Exit 5:
- Exit 6: National Pension Service Dongnae Geumjeong Governor
- Exit 7: Forbidden City Cafe, Jangchung-dong Royal Foot Bossam Busan Direct Store
- Exit 8: Greenjoy Dongnae
