= Seokdae station =

Station of the Busan Metro

410 석대 Seokdae
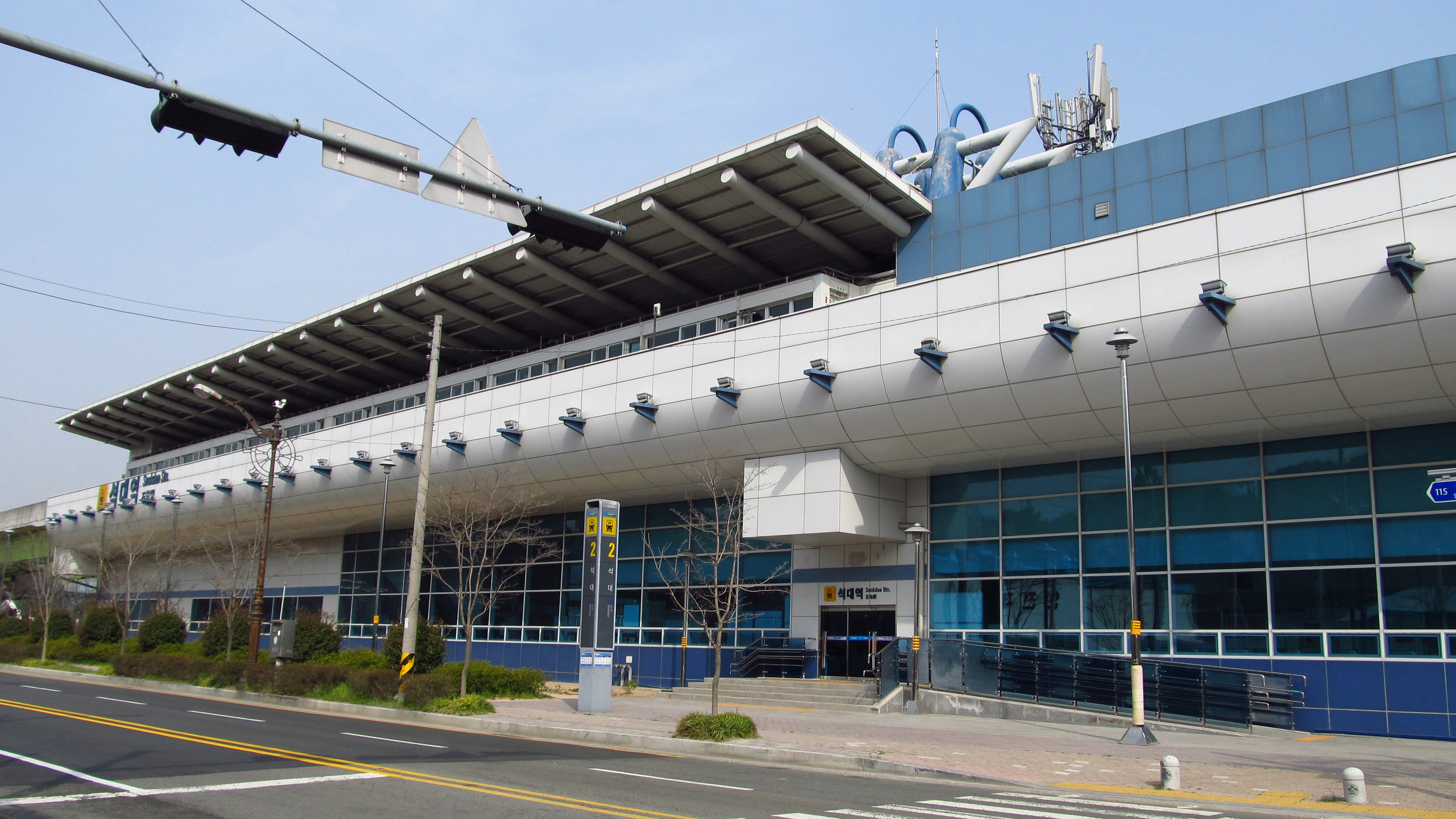

Korean name
- Hangul: 석대역
- Hanja: 石坮驛
- Revised Romanization: Seokdae yeok
- McCune–Reischauer: Sŏktae yŏk

General information
- Location: Seokdae-dong, Haeundae District, Busan; South Korea
- Coordinates: 35.2181°N 129.1369°E
- Operator: Busan Transportation Corporation
- Line: Line 4
- Platforms: 1
- Tracks: 2

Construction
- Structure type: Aboveground

Other information
- Station code: 410

History
- Opened: March 30, 2011

Services
Preceding station	Busan Metro	Following station
Banyeo Agricultural Market towards Minam	Line 4	Youngsan University towards Anpyeong
Location

Seokdae Station (Korean: 석대역; Hanja: 石坮驛) is an aboveground station of the Busan Metro Line 4 in Seokdae-dong, Haeundae District, Busan, South Korea.

== Station Layout ==
L2; Platforms
L2; Platforms	Southbound	← Line 4 toward Minam (Banyeo Agricultural Market)
L2; Platforms	Island platform, doors will open on the left
L2; Platforms	Northbound	Line 4 toward Anpyeong (Youngsan University) →

L1; Concourse	Lobby	Customer Service, Shops, Vending machines, ATMs

G	Street level	Exit

== Gallery ==
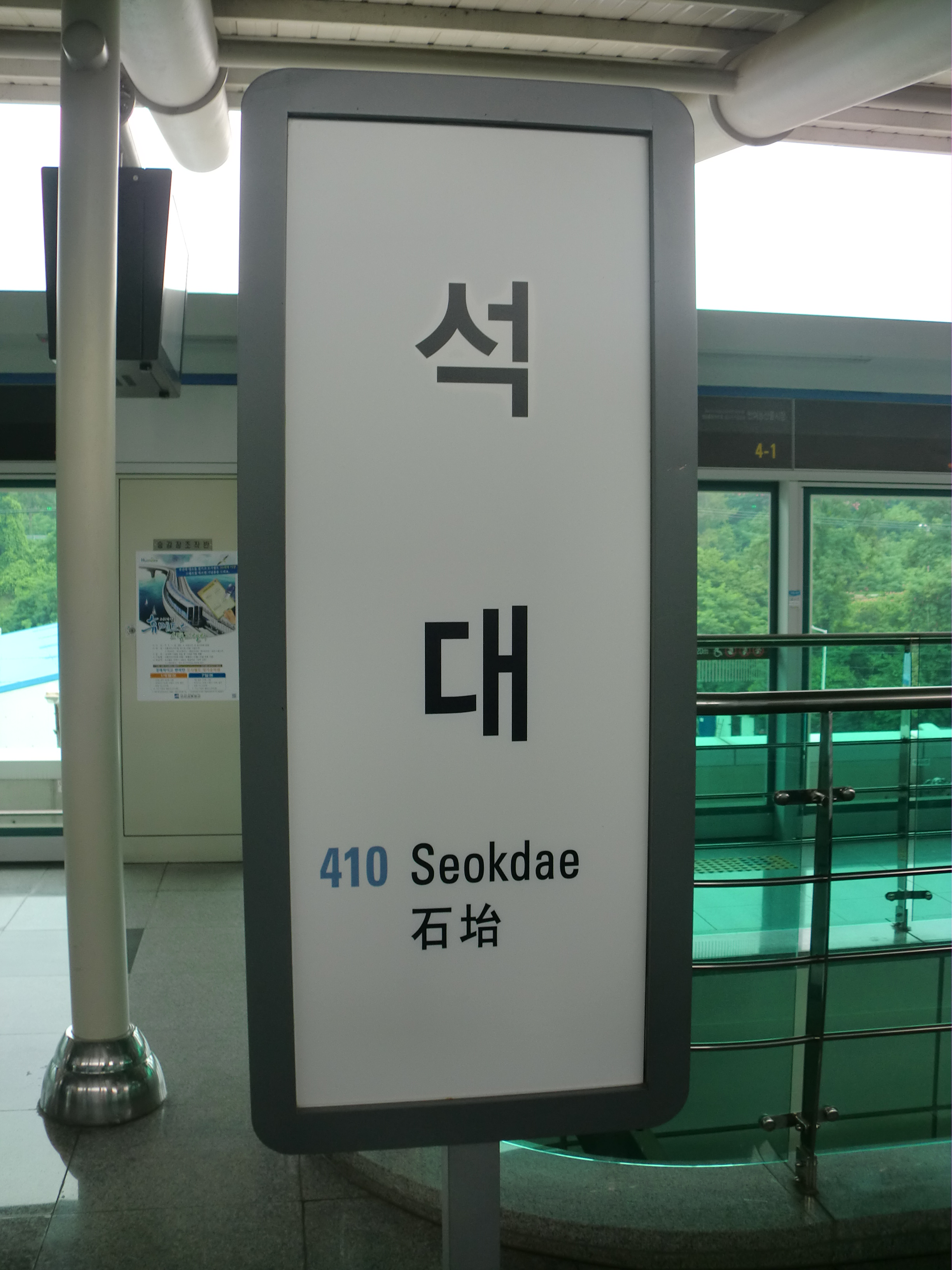
Station Sign
