= Seo-dong station =

Station of the Busan Metro

407 서동 Seo-dong
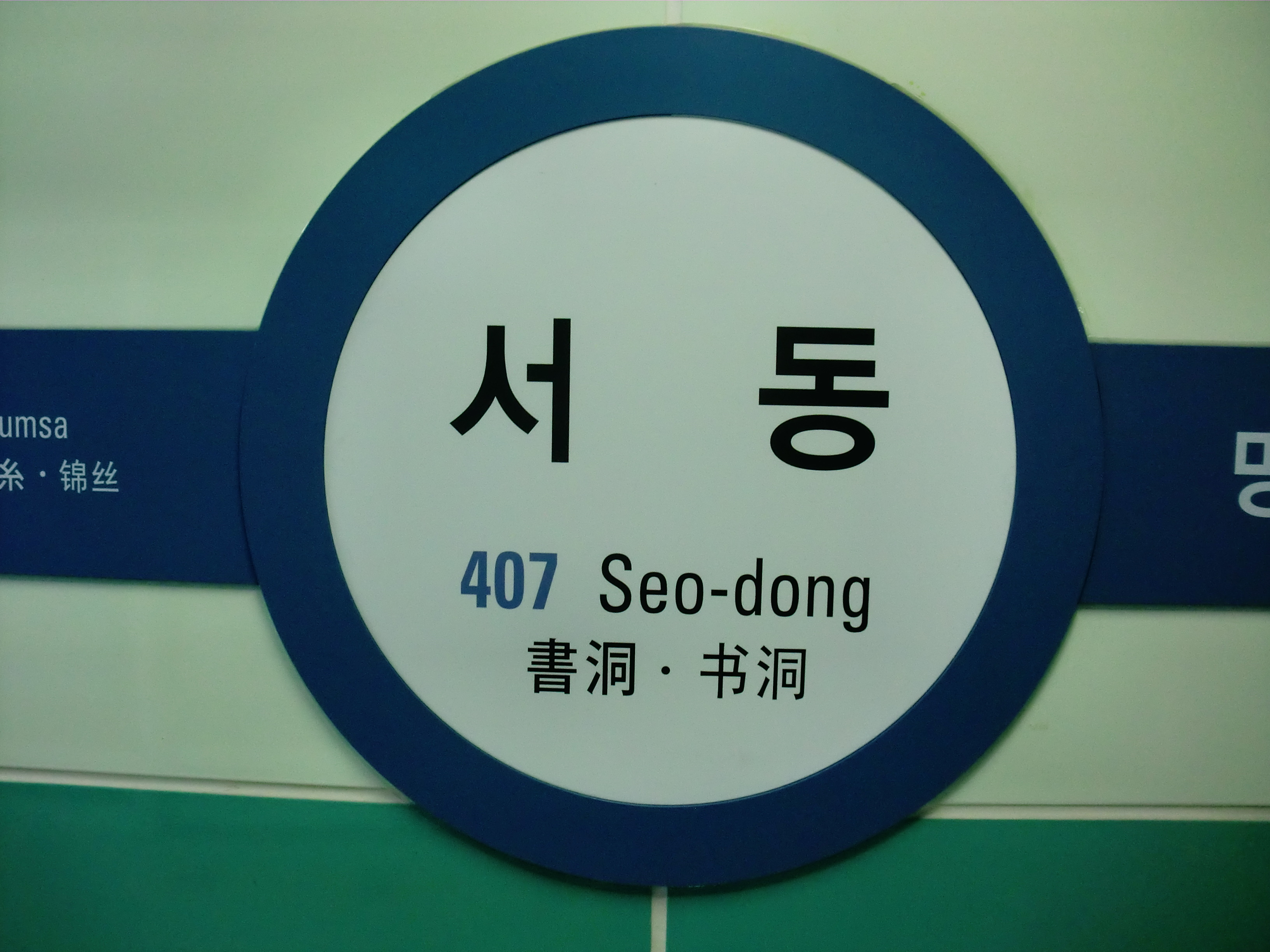

Korean name
- Hangul: 서동역
- Hanja: 書洞驛
- Revised Romanization: Seodong yeok
- McCune–Reischauer: Sŏtong yŏk

General information
- Location: Seo-dong, Geumjeong District, Busan; South Korea
- Coordinates: 35.2132°N 129.1075°E
- Operator: Busan Transportation Corporation
- Line: Line 4
- Platforms: 2
- Tracks: 2

Construction
- Structure type: Underground

Other information
- Station code: 407

History
- Opened: March 30, 2011

Services
Preceding station	Busan Metro	Following station
Myeongjang towards Minam	Line 4	Geumsa towards Anpyeong
Location

Seo-dong Station (Korean: 서동역; Hanja: 書洞驛) is an underground station of the Busan Metro Line 4 in Seo-dong, Geumjeong District, Busan, South Korea.

== Station Layout ==
G	Street level	Exit

L1; Concourse	Lobby	Customer Service, Shops, Vending machines, ATMs

L2; Platforms	Side platform, doors will open on the right
L2; Platforms	Southbound	← Line 4 toward Minam (Myeongjang)
L2; Platforms	Northbound	Line 4 toward Anpyeong (Geumsa) →
L2; Platforms	Side platform, doors will open on the right

== Vicinity ==
- Exit 1: Hyundai Oilbank
- Exit 2:
- Exit 3: Kia Auto Q Service
- Exit 4:
