= Banyeo Agricultural Market station =

Station of the Busan Metro

409 반여농산물시장 Banyeo Agricultural Market
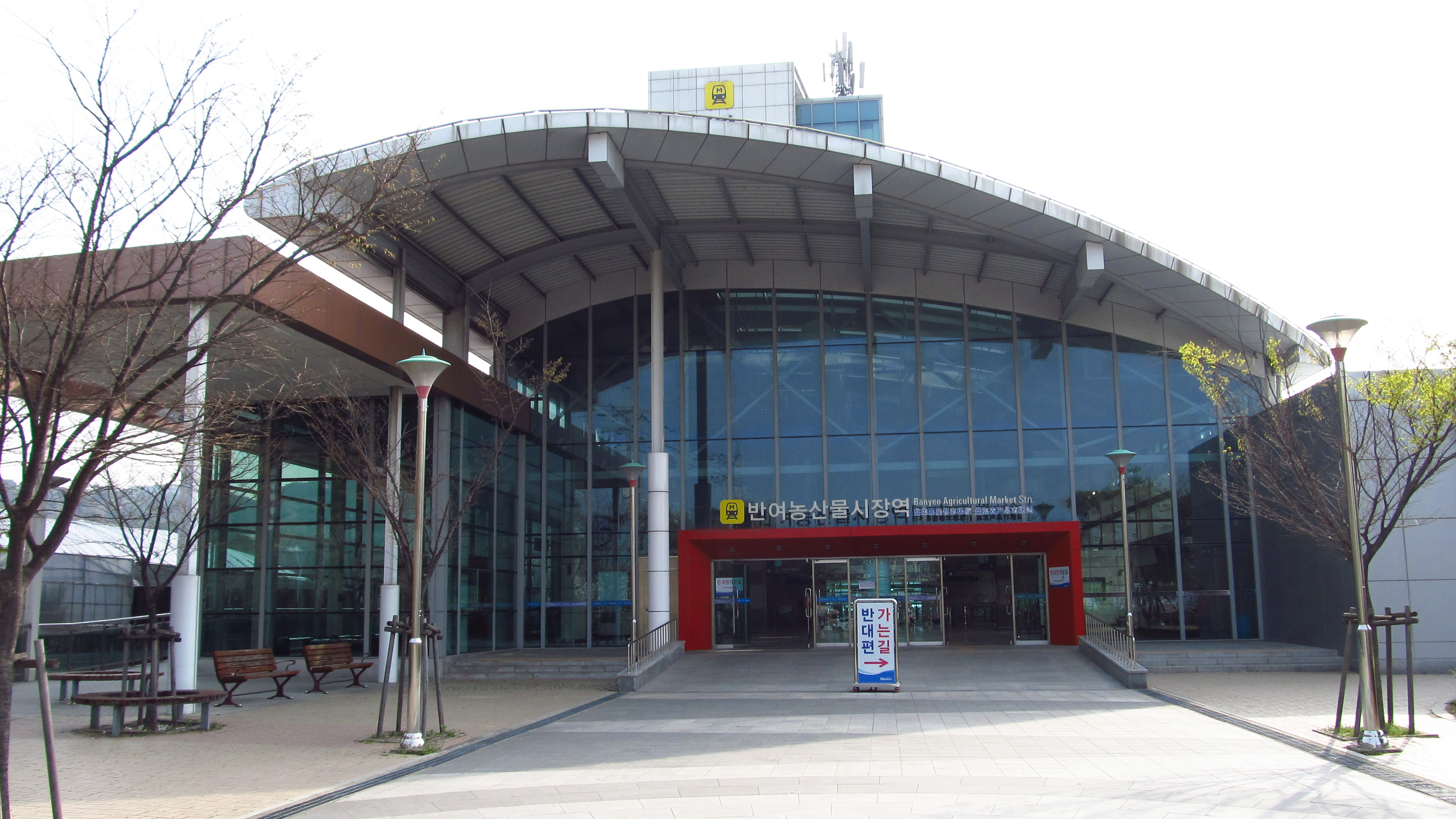
- Banyeo Agricultural Market Station Entrance No. 1

Korean name
- Hangul: 반여농산물시장역
- Hanja: 盤如農産物市場驛
- Revised Romanization: Banyeo Nongsanmulsijang-yeok
- McCune–Reischauer: Panyŏ Nongsanmulsijang-yŏk

General information
- Location: Seokdae-dong, Haeundae District, Busan; South Korea
- Coordinates: 35.218°N 129.124°E
- Operator: Busan Transportation Corporation
- Line: Line 4
- Platforms: 2
- Tracks: 2
- Bus routes: 5-1 36 43 107 115-1 184 189-1

Construction
- Structure type: Underground

Other information
- Station code: 409

History
- Opened: March 30, 2011

Services
Preceding station	Busan Metro	Following station
Geumsa towards Minam	Line 4	Seokdae towards Anpyeong
Location
- Location within Busan

Banyeo Agricultural Market Station (Korean: 반여농산물시장역; Hanja: 盤如農産物市場驛) is a station of the Busan Metro Line 4 in Seokdae-dong, Haeundae District, Busan, South Korea. The station name comes from the nearby Banyeo Agricultural Products Wholesale Market.

It is the last underground station before proceed the next elevated station named Seokdae.

== Station Layout ==
G	Street level	Exit

L1; Concourse	Lobby	Customer Service, Shops, Vending machines, ATMs

L2; Platforms	Side platform, doors will open on the right
L2; Platforms	Southbound	← Line 4 toward Minam (Geumsa)
L2; Platforms	Northbound	Line 4 toward Anpyeong (Seokdae) →
L2; Platforms	Side platform, doors will open on the right

== Gallery ==
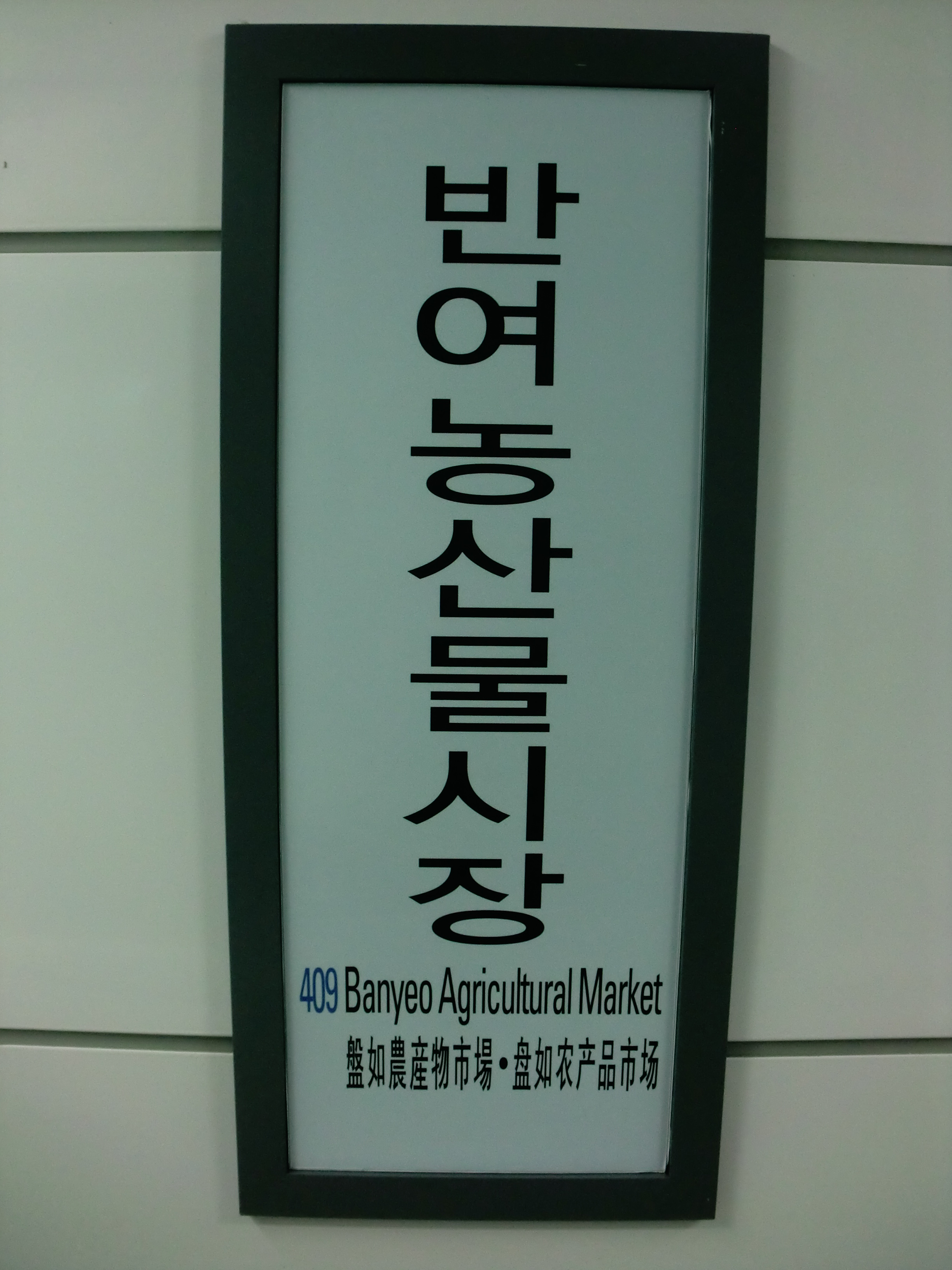
Banyeo Agricultural Market Station Sign
