= Gochon station =

Station of the Busan Metro

413 고촌 Gochon
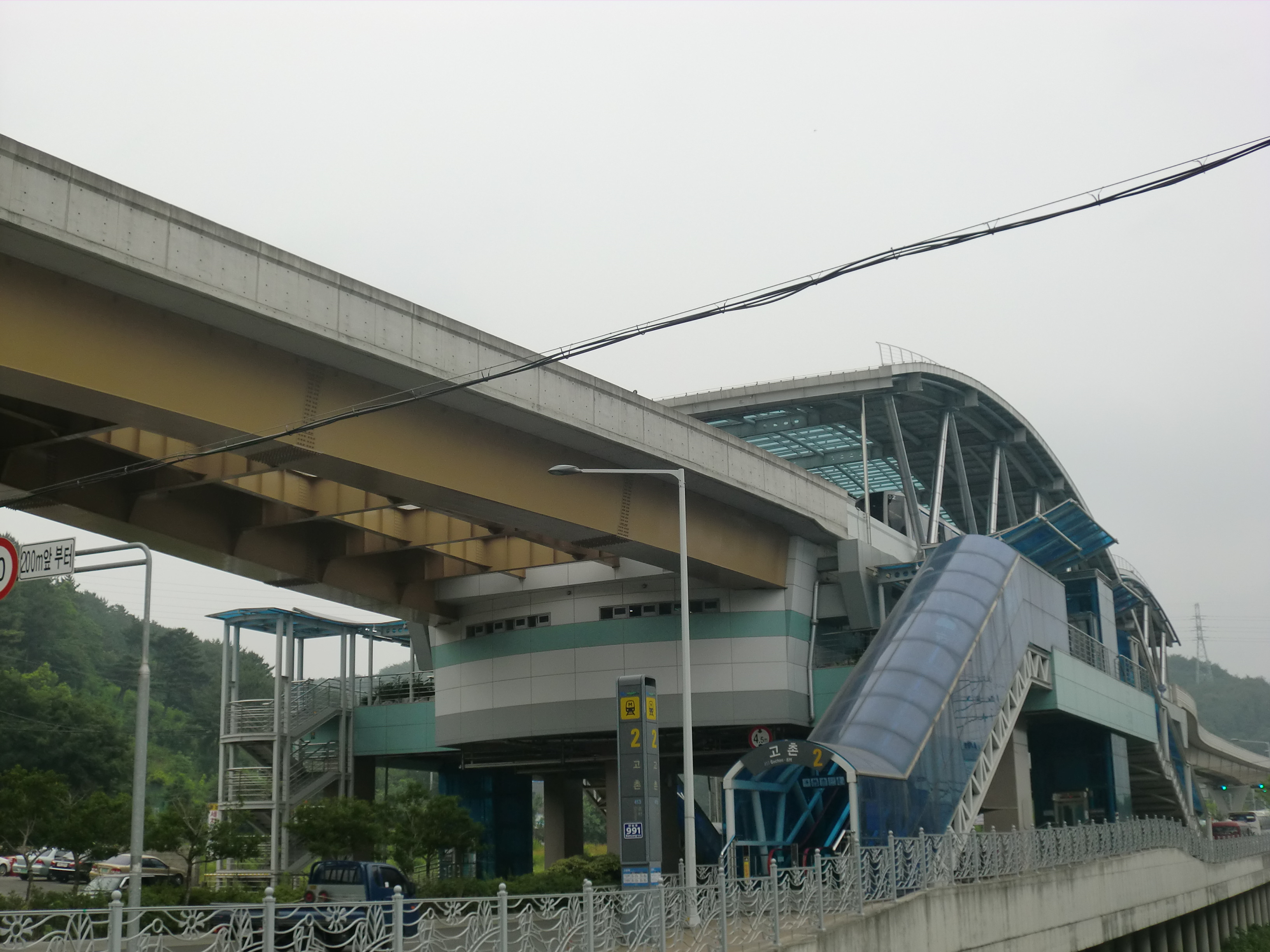

Korean name
- Hangul: 고촌역
- Hanja: 古村驛
- Revised Romanization: Gochon-yeok
- McCune–Reischauer: Koch'on-yŏk

General information
- Location: Cheolma-myeon, Gijang County, Busan; South Korea
- Coordinates: 35.2360°N 129.1605°E
- Operator: Busan Transportation Corporation
- Line: Line 4
- Platforms: 1
- Tracks: 2

Construction
- Structure type: Aboveground

Other information
- Station code: 413

History
- Opened: March 30, 2011

Services
Preceding station	Busan Metro	Following station
Witbansong towards Minam	Line 4	Anpyeong Terminus
Location

Gochon Station (Korean: 고촌역) is a station of the Busan Metro Line 4 in Cheolma-myeon, Gijang County, Busan, South Korea. This station name comes from Gochon-ri, Cheolma-myeon.

== Station Layout ==
L2; Platforms
L2; Platforms	Southbound	← Line 4 toward Minam (Witbansong)
L2; Platforms	Island platform, doors will open on the left
L2; Platforms	Northbound	Line 4 toward Anpyeong (Terminus) →

L1; Concourse	Lobby	Customer Service, Shops, Vending machines, ATMs

G	Street level	Exit

== Gallery ==
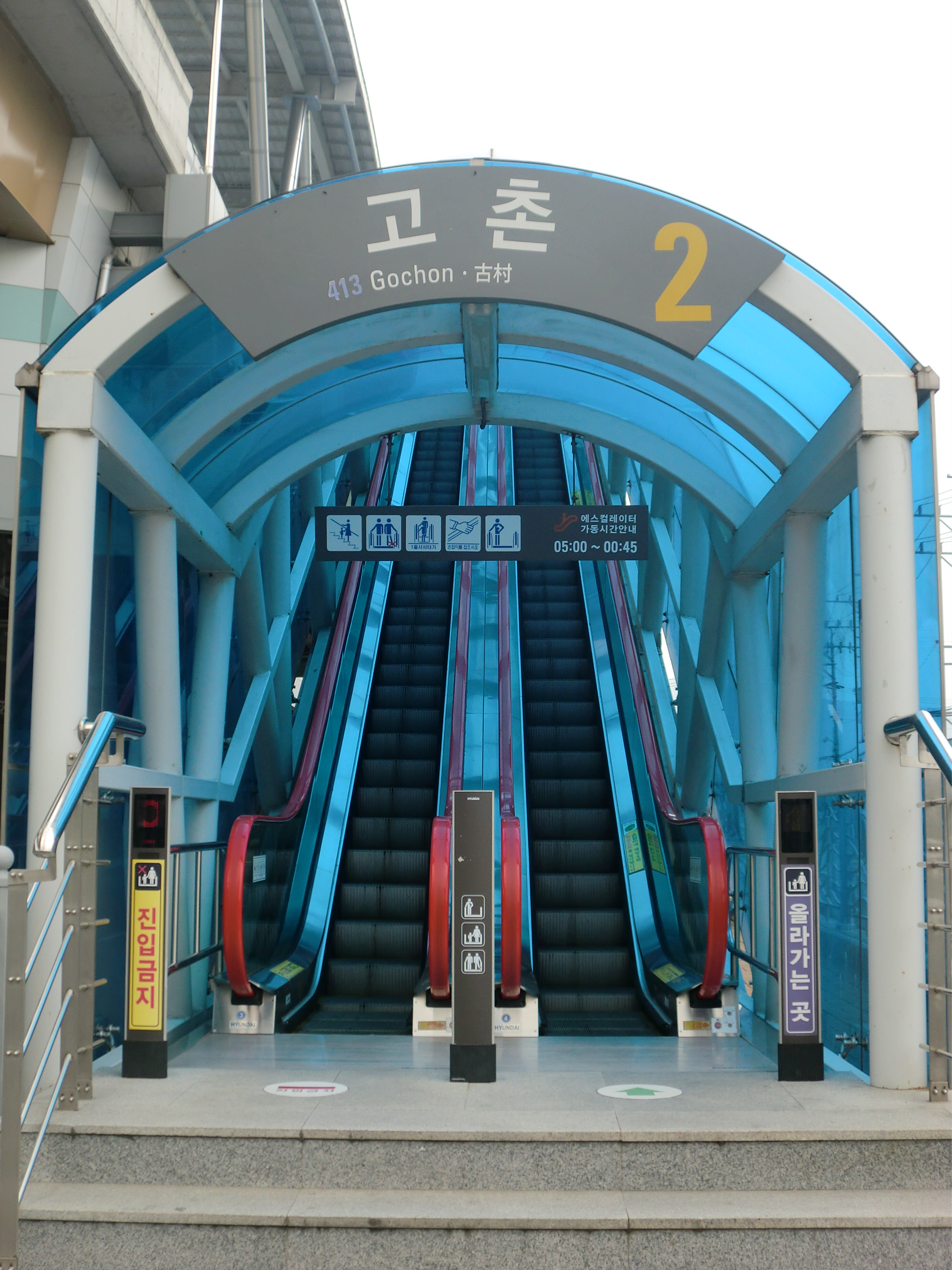
Gochon Station Entrance No. 2

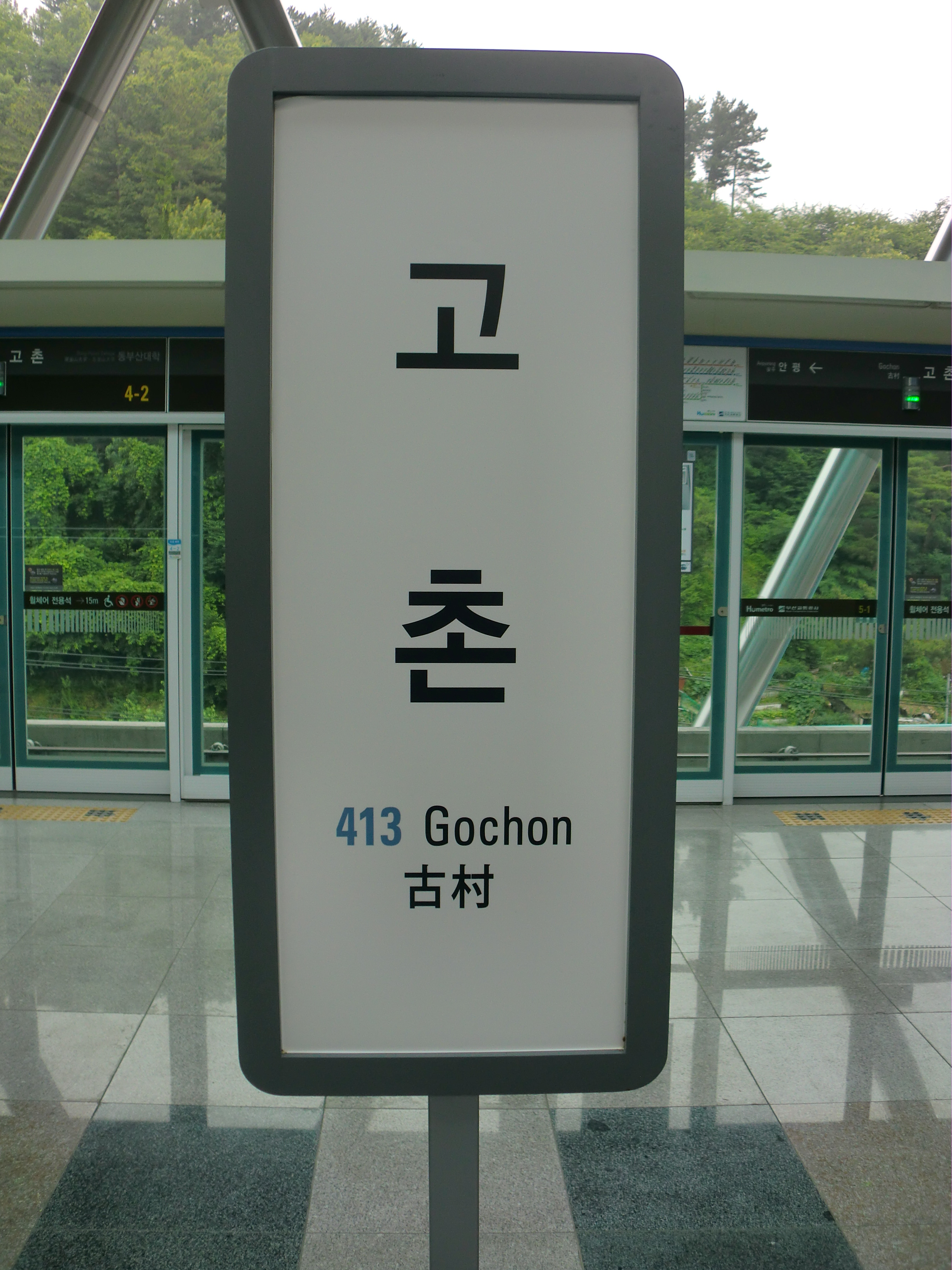
Gochon Station Sign

== Vicinity ==
- Exit 1: GS Gas Station
- Exit 2: Bus Stop
