= Dongnae station (Busan Metro) =

Station of the Busan Metro

125 402 동래 (한국건강관리협회) Dongnae (Korea Health Management Association)
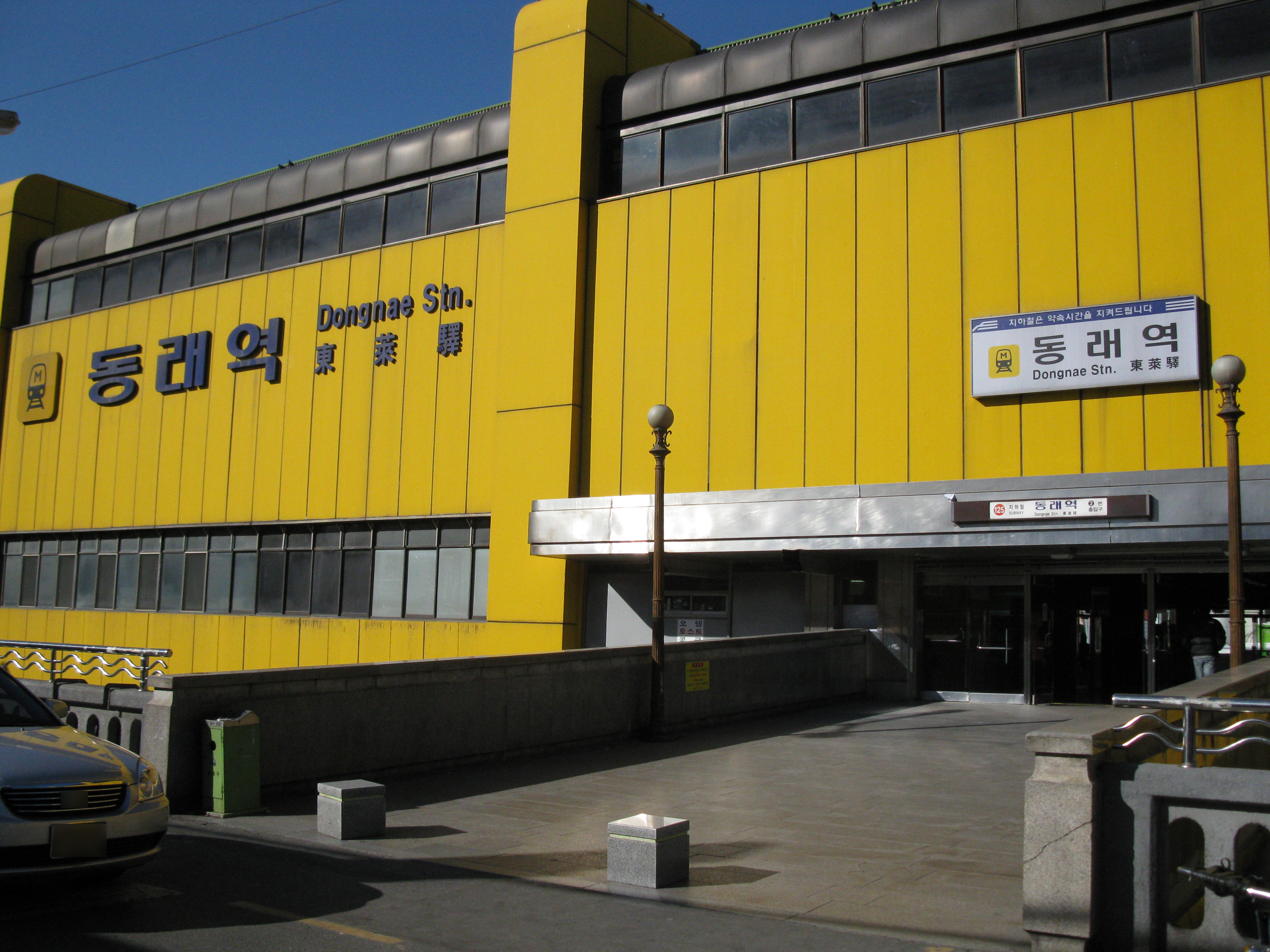
- Dongnae Station Entrance No. 2

Korean name
- Hangul: 동래역
- Hanja: 東萊驛
- Revised Romanization: Dongnae-yeok
- McCune–Reischauer: Tongnae-yŏk

General information
- Location: Oncheon-dong/Myeongnyun-dong, Dongnae District, Busan; South Korea
- Coordinates: 35°12′20″N 129°04′43″E
- Operator: Busan Transportation Corporation
- Lines: Line 1 Line 4
- Platforms: 2
- Tracks: 2

Construction
- Structure type: Aboveground (Line 1); Underground (Line 4)

Other information
- Station code: 125 (Line 1); 402 (Line 4)

History
- Opened: July 19, 1985 (Line 1); March 30, 2011 (Line 4)

Services
Preceding station	Busan Metro	Following station
Busan National University of Education towards Dadaepo Beach	Line 1	Myeongnyun towards Nopo
Minam Terminus	Line 4	Suan towards Anpyeong
Location

Dongnae Station (Korean: 동래역; Hanja: 東萊驛) is a station of the Busan Metro Line 1 and Busan Metro Line 4 in Oncheon-dong and Myeongnyun-dong, Dongnae District, Busan, South Korea. The station is unrelated to the Dongnae Station of Korail.

== Station Layout ==
=== Line 1 ===
Myeongnyun ↑
S/B | | N/B
↓ Busan National University of Education

Southbound	← ● Line 1 toward Dadaepo Beach
Northbound	● Line 1 toward Nopo →

=== Line 4 ===
Suan ↑
S/B | | N/B
↓ Minam

Southbound	← ● Line 4 toward Minam
Northbound	● Line 4 toward Anpyeong →

== Gallery ==
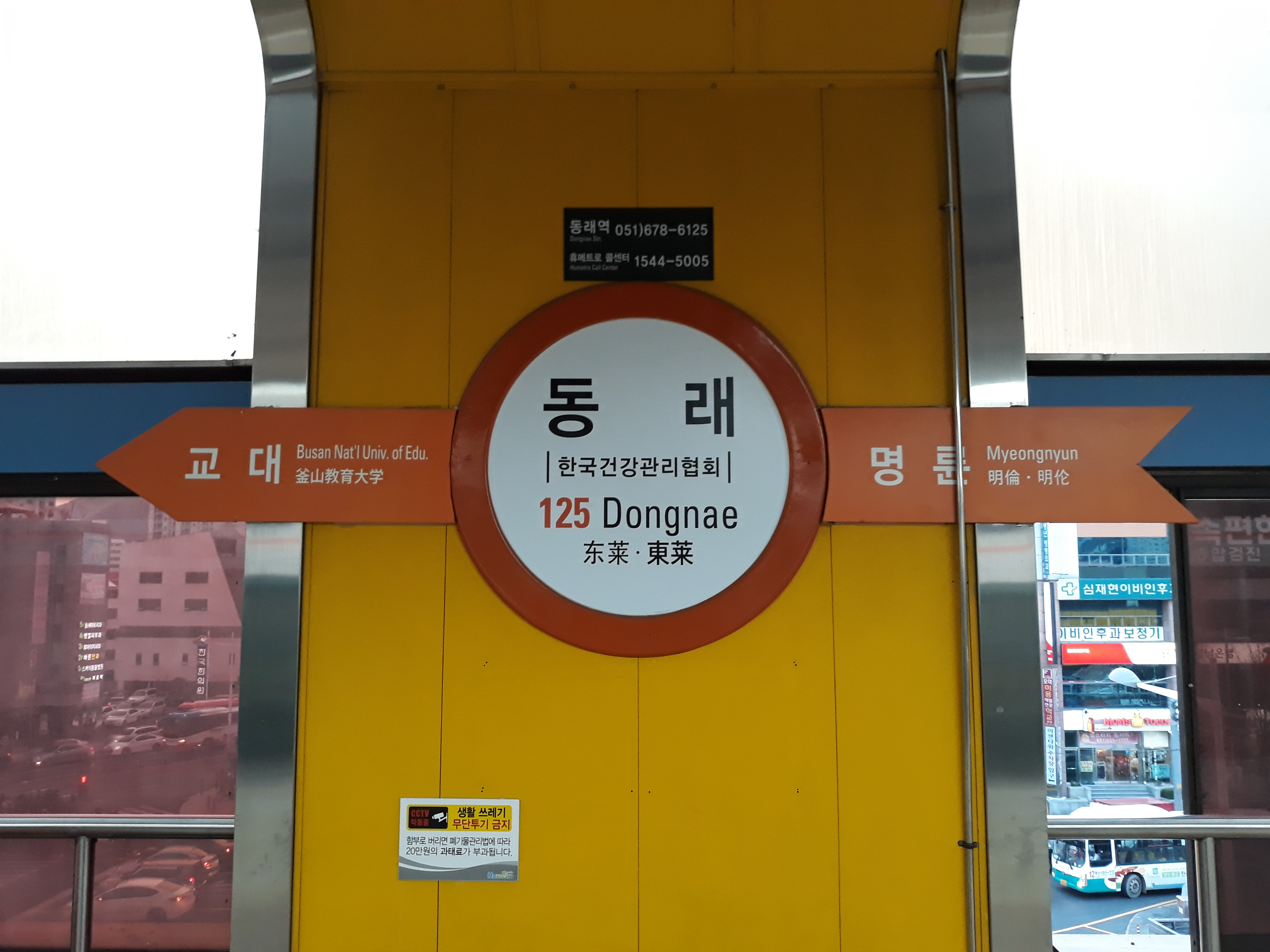
Station Sign (Line 1)

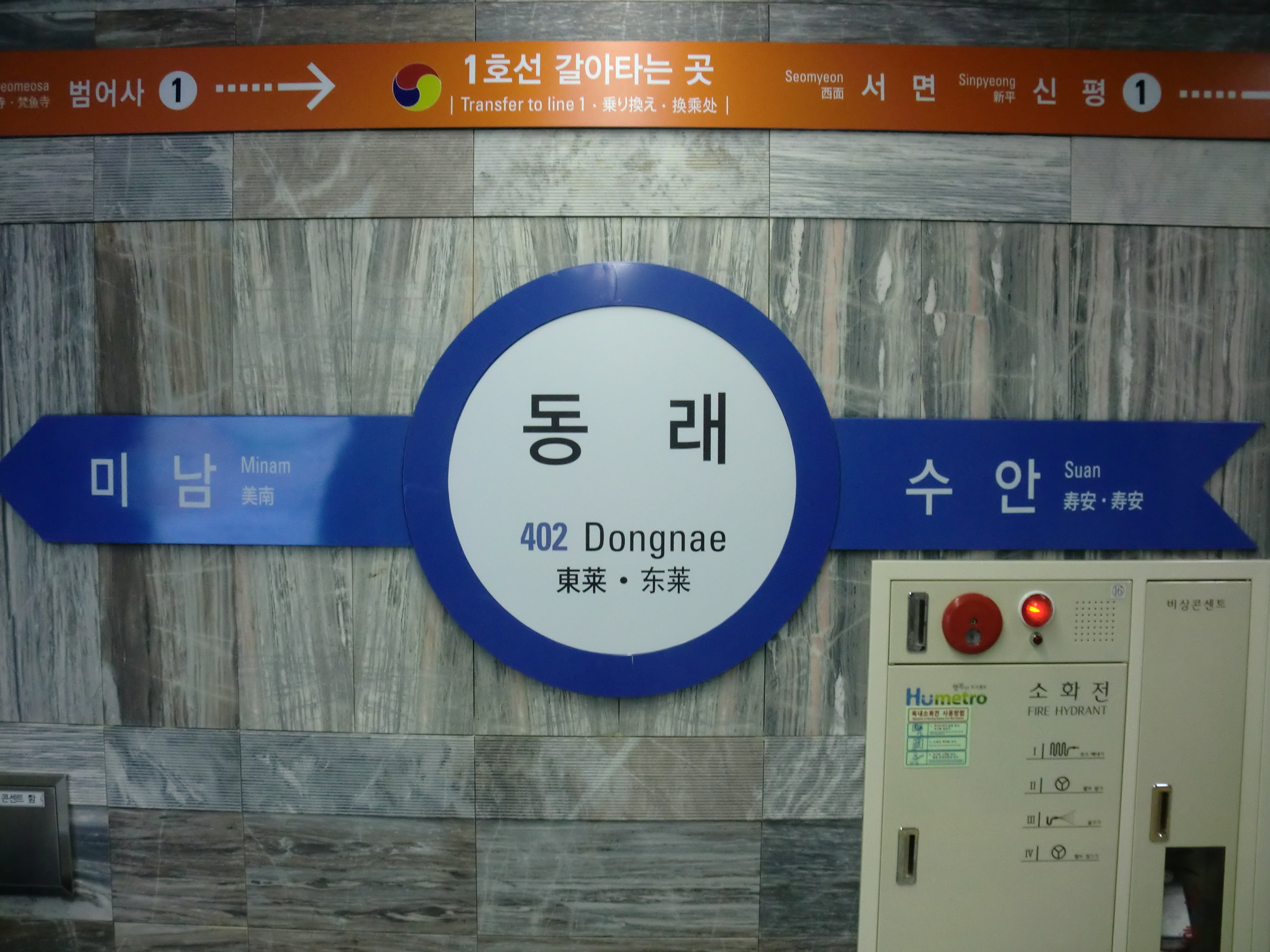
Station Sign (Line 4)

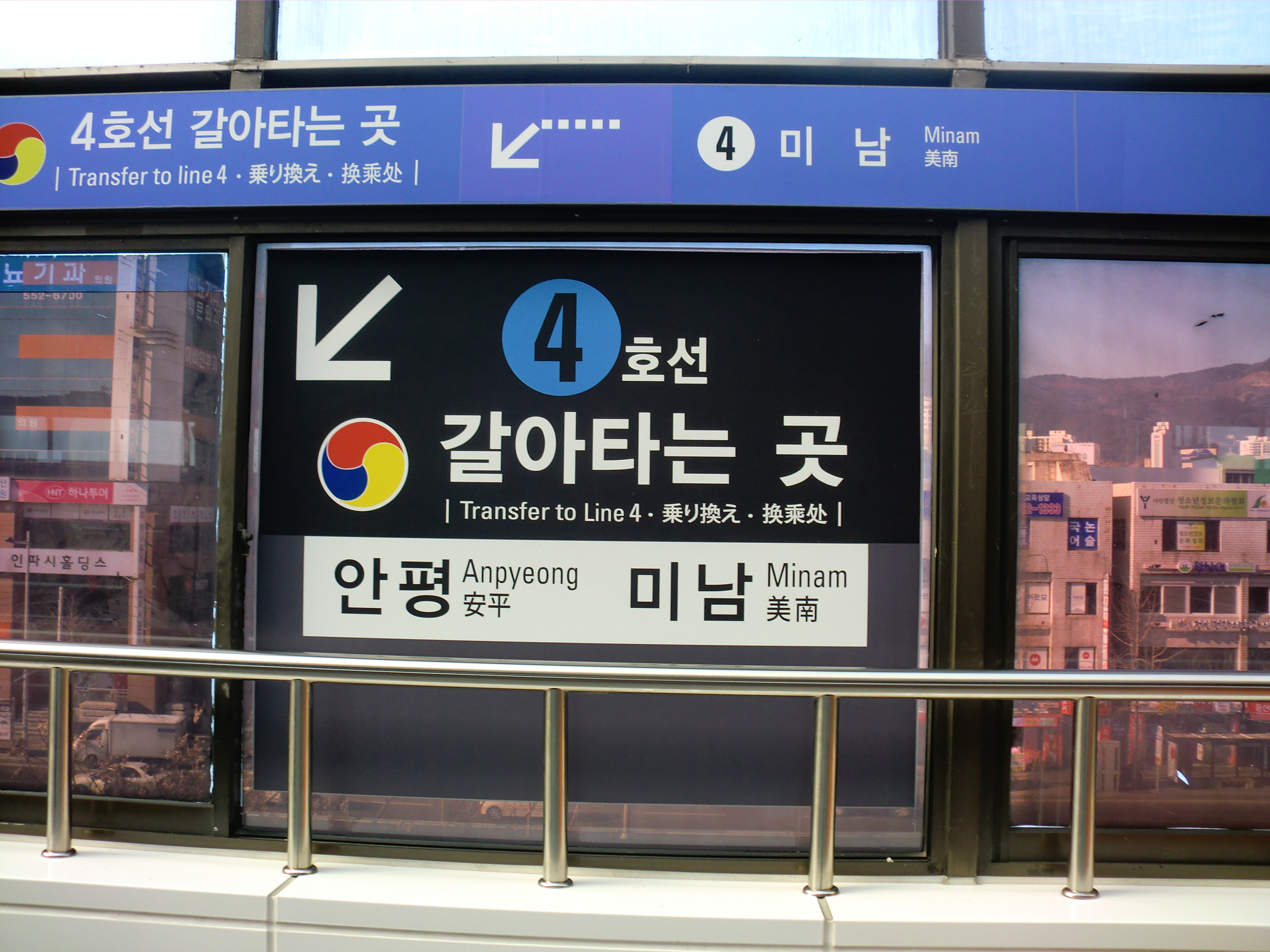
Line 4 Transferring
