= Myeongnyun station =

Station of the Busan Metro

126 명륜 Myeongnyun
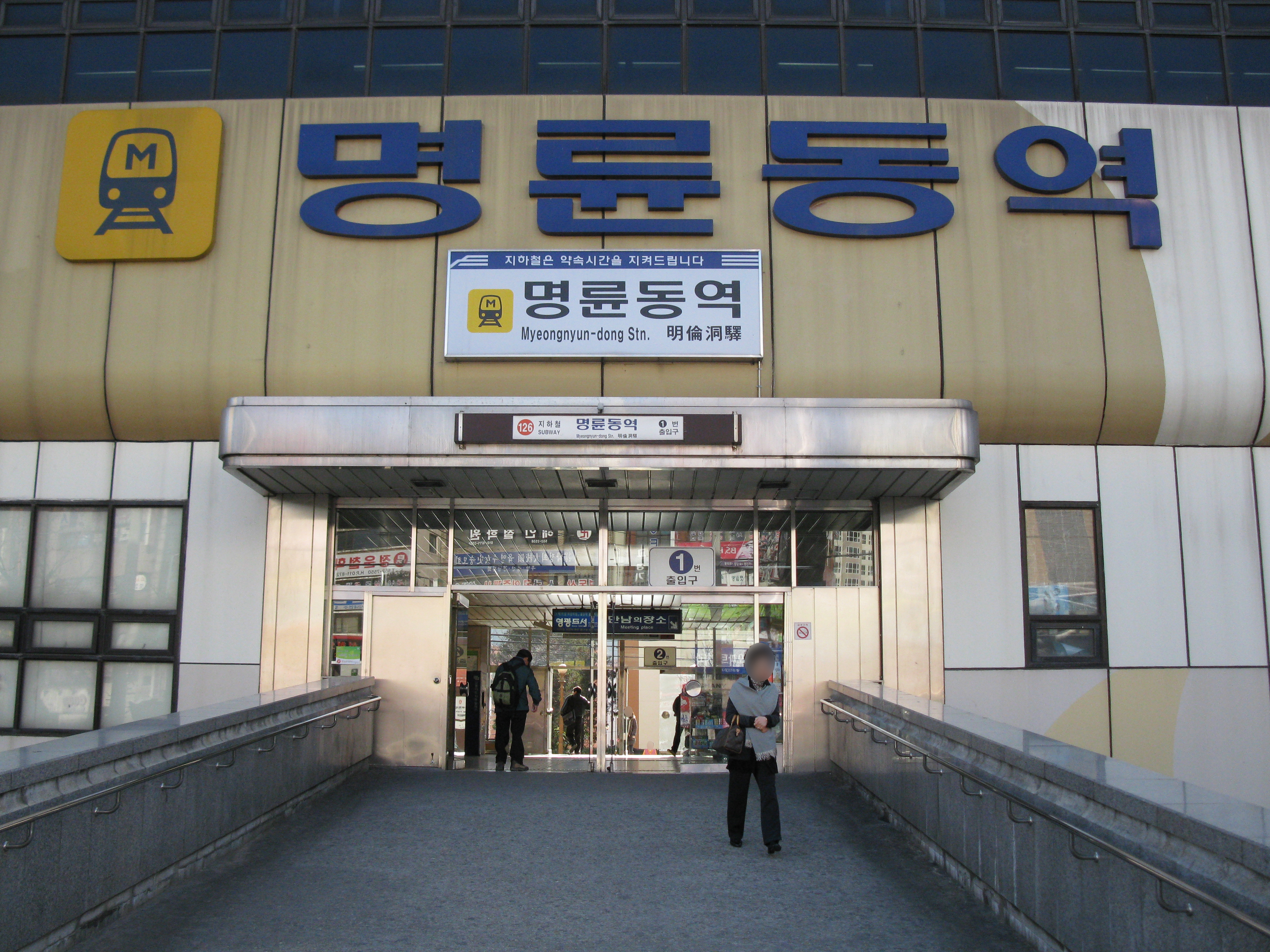

Korean name
- Hangul: 명륜역
- Hanja: 明倫驛
- Revised Romanization: Myeongryun yeok
- McCune–Reischauer: Myŏngryun yŏk

General information
- Location: Myeongnyun-dong, Dongnae District, Busan; South Korea
- Coordinates: 35°12′44″N 129°04′46″E
- Operator: Busan Transportation Corporation
- Line: Line 1
- Platforms: 2
- Tracks: 2

Construction
- Structure type: Aboveground

Other information
- Station code: 126

History
- Opened: July 19, 1985
- Former names: Myeongnyun-dong

Services
Preceding station	Busan Metro	Following station
Dongnae towards Dadaepo Beach	Line 1	Oncheonjang towards Nopo
Location

Myeongnyun Station (Korean: 명륜역; Hanja: 明倫驛) is a station of Busan Metro Line 1 in Myeongnyun-dong, Dongnae District, Busan, South Korea.

== Station Layout ==
G	Street level	Exit

L1; Concourse	Lobby	Customer Service, Shops, Vending machines, ATMs

L2; Platforms	Side platform, doors will open on the right
L2; Platforms	Southbound	← Line 1 toward Dadaepo Beach (Dongnae)
L2; Platforms	Northbound	Line 1 toward Nopo (Oncheonjang)→
L2; Platforms	Side platform, doors will open on the right

== Gallery ==
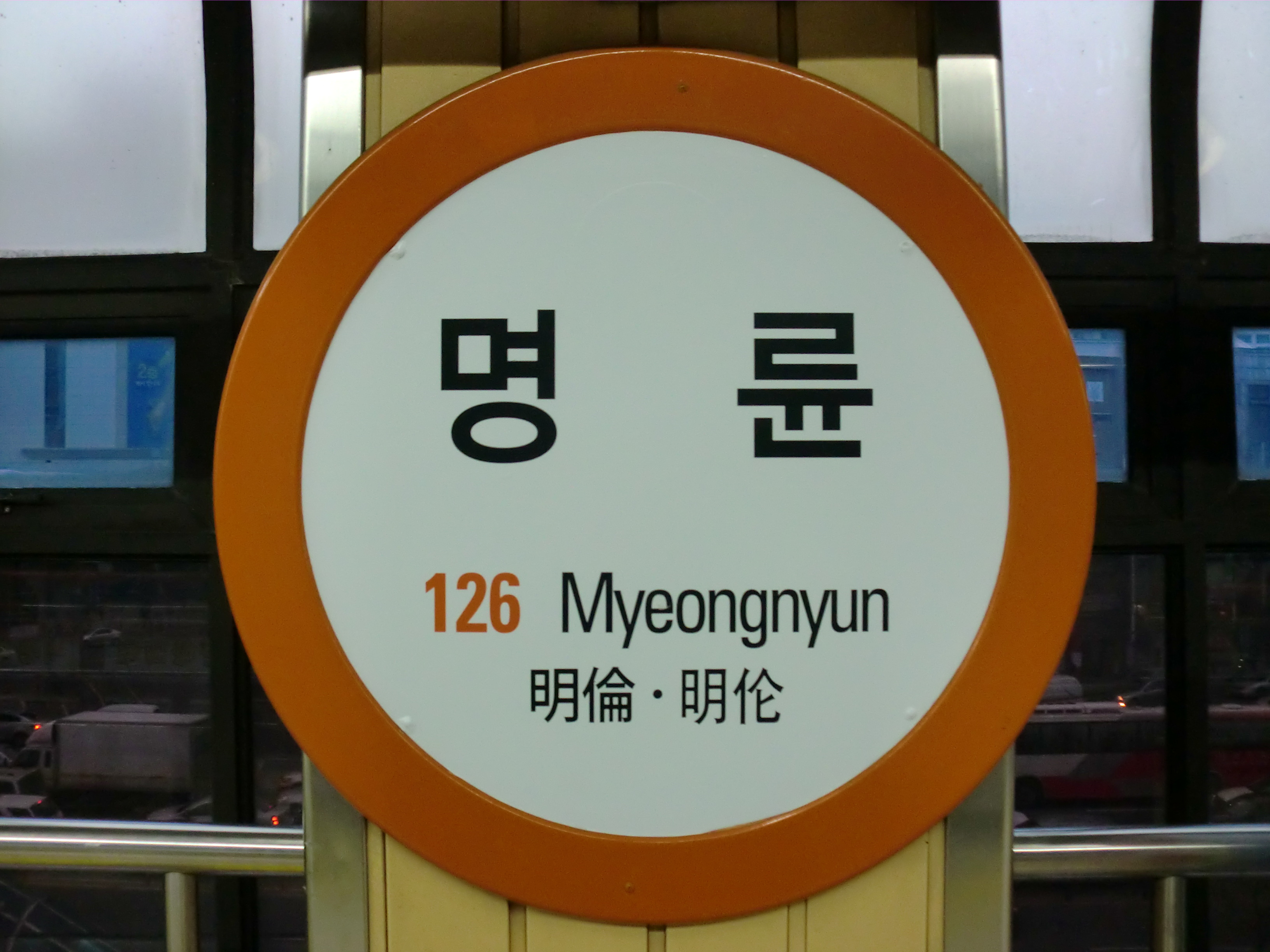
Station Sign

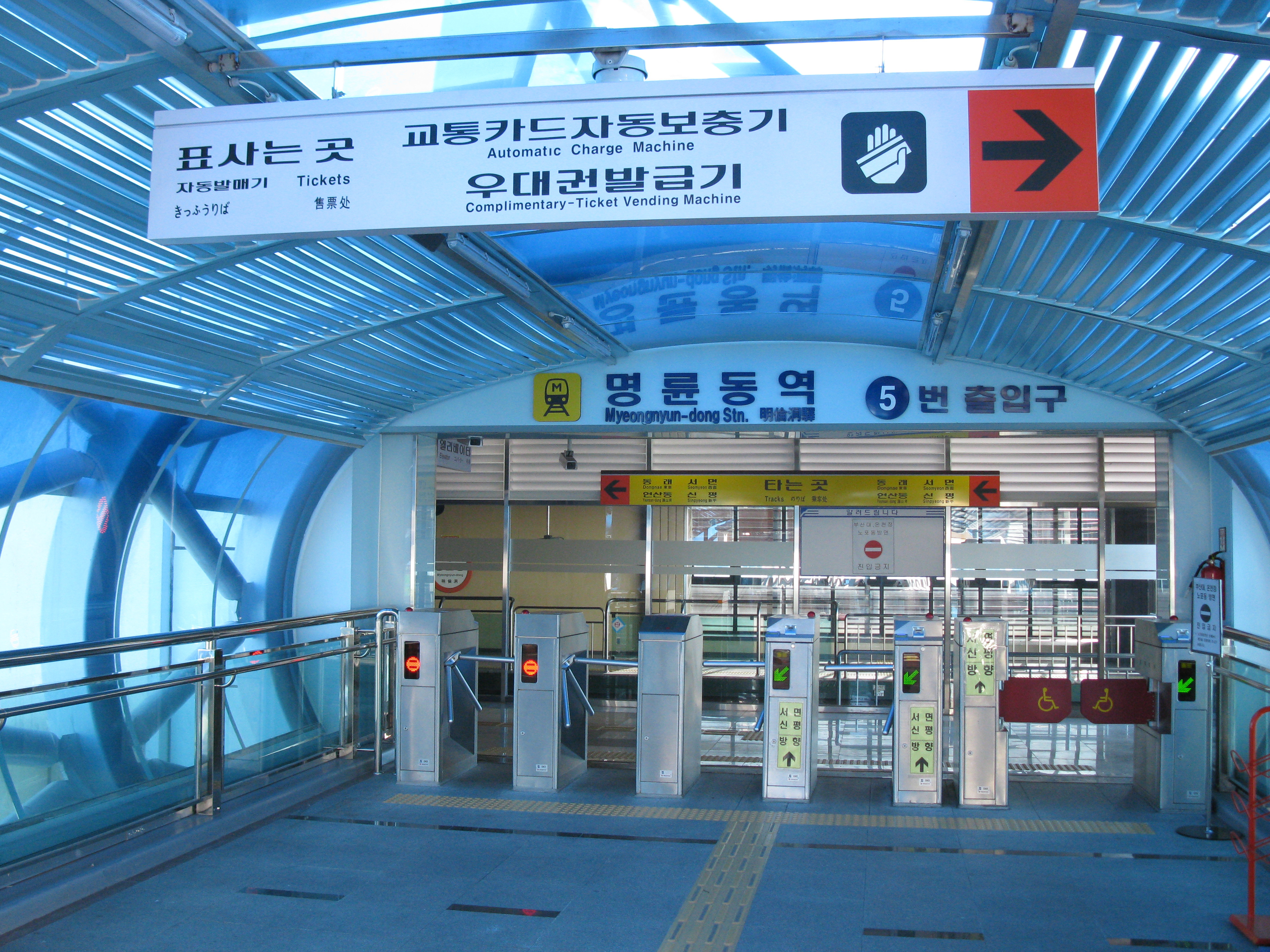
Station No. 5 Entrance
