= Busan Metro Line 4 =

Rubber-tyred subway line in Busan, South Korea

Line 4
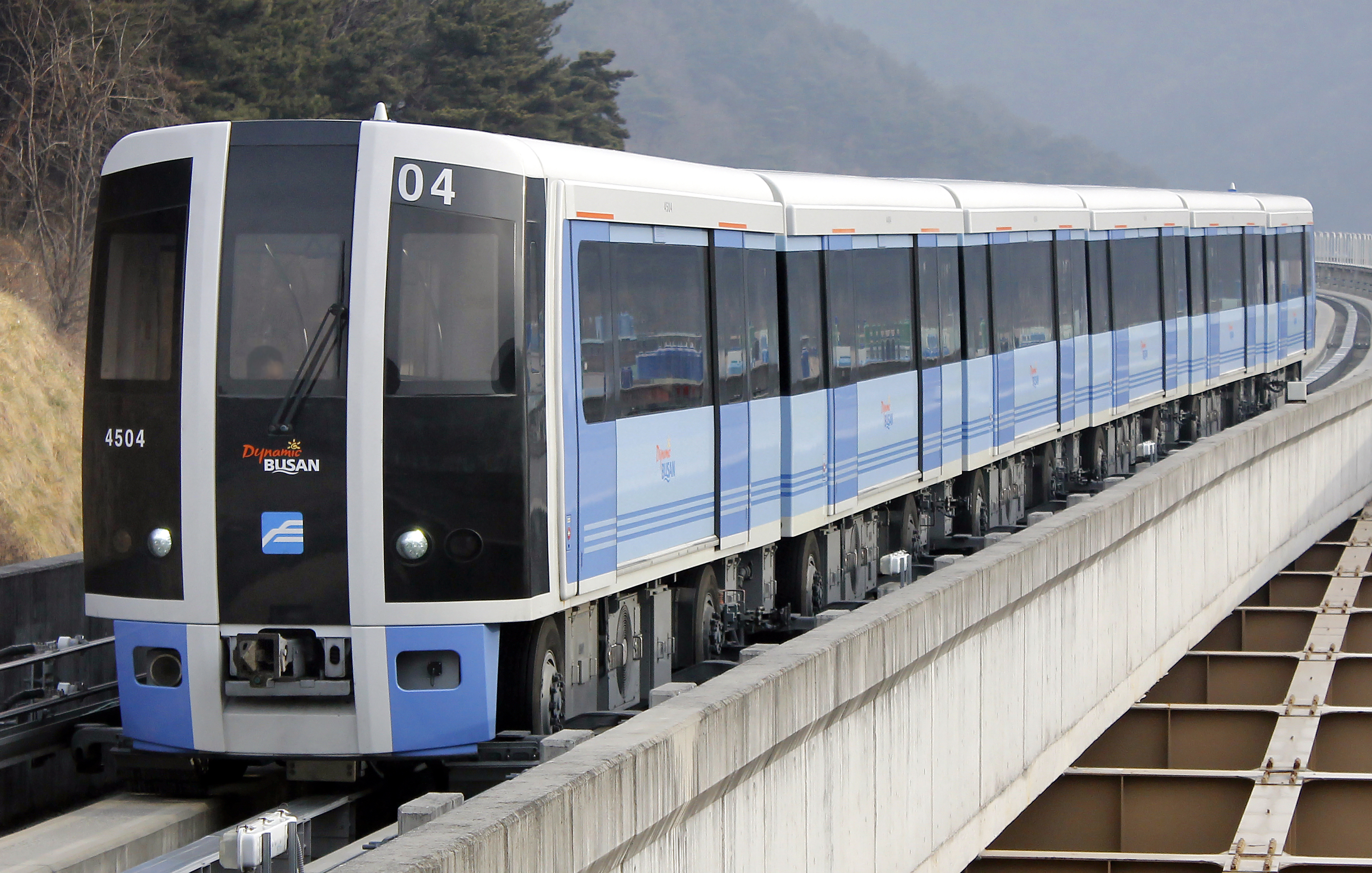

Overview
- Native name: 4호선(4號線); Sa Hoseon
- Status: Operational
- Termini: Anpyeong; Minam
- Stations: 14

Service
- Type: Light metro Rubber-tyred metro
- System: Busan Metro
- Services: 1
- Operator(s): Busan Transportation Corporation
- Depot(s): Anpyeong
- Rolling stock: Woojin Industrial EMU Class 4000

History
- Opened: 30 March 2011; 15 years ago

Technical
- Line length: 10.8 km (6.7 mi)
- Number of tracks: 2
- Track gauge: 1,700 mm (5 ft 6 15/16 in)
- Electrification: 750 V DC guide bars

Busan Metro Line 4 (4호선) is a rubber-tyred light metro line of the Busan Metro network that connects part of Gijang-gun, Busan, and upper Haeundae-gu, Busan, into Dongnae-gu, Busan Korea. It is operated by the Busan Transportation Corporation. Opened on 30 March 2011, the line is a rapid transit (metro) system consisting of 14 stations - 8 underground, 1 on-ground, and 5 above-ground. The line color is blue. A trip through the entire line takes about 24 minutes. Unlike lines 1 to 3 of Busan Metro, the trains are driverless and run with pneumatic tires on concrete track (Roll way) between two guide bars. Line 4 was originally planned to be simply a branch of Line 3 (similar to Seoul Subway Line 2's Sinjeong and Seongsu branches), but was turned into its own line later.

Line 4's station signs have blue frames, sharing their design with the station sign design used in some stations of Line 1, such as Seomyeon and Dongnae. Their main body is white and circled by a blue frame and the station name is printed in big Hangul near the top with smaller English and Hanja names near the bottom, with the English name having the station number beside it. The arm that points to the next station has that station's name in it and a pointed end, while the arm that has the previous station's name printed on it and points to that station has a concave indent.

== Lines 3 and 4 ==
While Busan Metro Line 3 was being planned, the planners thought about making what is now Busan Metro Line 4 the 2nd phase of Busan Metro Line 3. However, for several reasons, they have made this 2nd phase into a new line called Busan Subway Line 4.

== Archaeology ==
Compared to Line 3, Line 4 took quite a long time for its construction. There are many reasons for this; however the most significant one is that there were many artifacts found in the construction site of the line, including those from the time of the Three Kingdoms of Korea and the Joseon dynasty. These artifacts had great historical value, so they caused the completion date of the line to be delayed from its original date of opening in 2008. Some of these artifacts are being displayed inside a historical museum dedicated to this in Suan Station (the museum opened on 28 January 2011).

== Rolling stock ==
Woojin Industrial System Company Limited, supplied urban rubber tire trains for Line 4.

== List of stations ==
All stations are in Busan.

Station Number	Station name			Transfer	Distance in km	Total distance	Location
Station Number	English	Hangul	Hanja	Transfer	Distance in km	Total distance	Location
401	Minam	미남	美南	Busan Metro Line 3	---	0.0	Dongnae
402	Dongnae	동래	東萊	Busan Metro Line 1	1.0	1.0	Dongnae
403	Suan	수안 (동래읍성임진왜란역사관)	壽安 (東來邑城壬辰倭亂歷史館)		0.7	1.7	Dongnae
404	Nangmin	낙민	樂民		0.6	2.3	Dongnae
405	Chungnyeolsa	충렬사 (안락·부산항운병원)	忠烈祠 (安樂)		0.6	2.9	Dongnae
406	Myeongjang	명장	鳴藏		0.6	3.5	Dongnae
407	Seo-dong	서동	書洞		0.9	4.4	Geumjeong
408	Geumsa	금사	錦絲		0.6	5.0	Geumjeong
409	Banyeo Agricultural Market	반여농산물시장	盤如農産物市場		0.7	5.7	Haeundae
410	Seokdae	석대	石坮		1.1	6.8	Haeundae
411	Youngsan University	영산대 (아랫반송)	靈山大 (아랫盤松)		1.2	8.0	Haeundae
412	Witbansong	윗반송	윗盤松		1.3	9.3	Haeundae
413	Gochon	고촌	古村		0.6	9.9	Gijang
414	Anpyeong	안평 (고촌주택단지)	安平 (古村住宅團地)		0.9	10.8	Gijang

== See also ==
- Busan Metro
- Transportation in South Korea
