= Sajik station =

Station of the Busan Metro

308 사직 Sajik
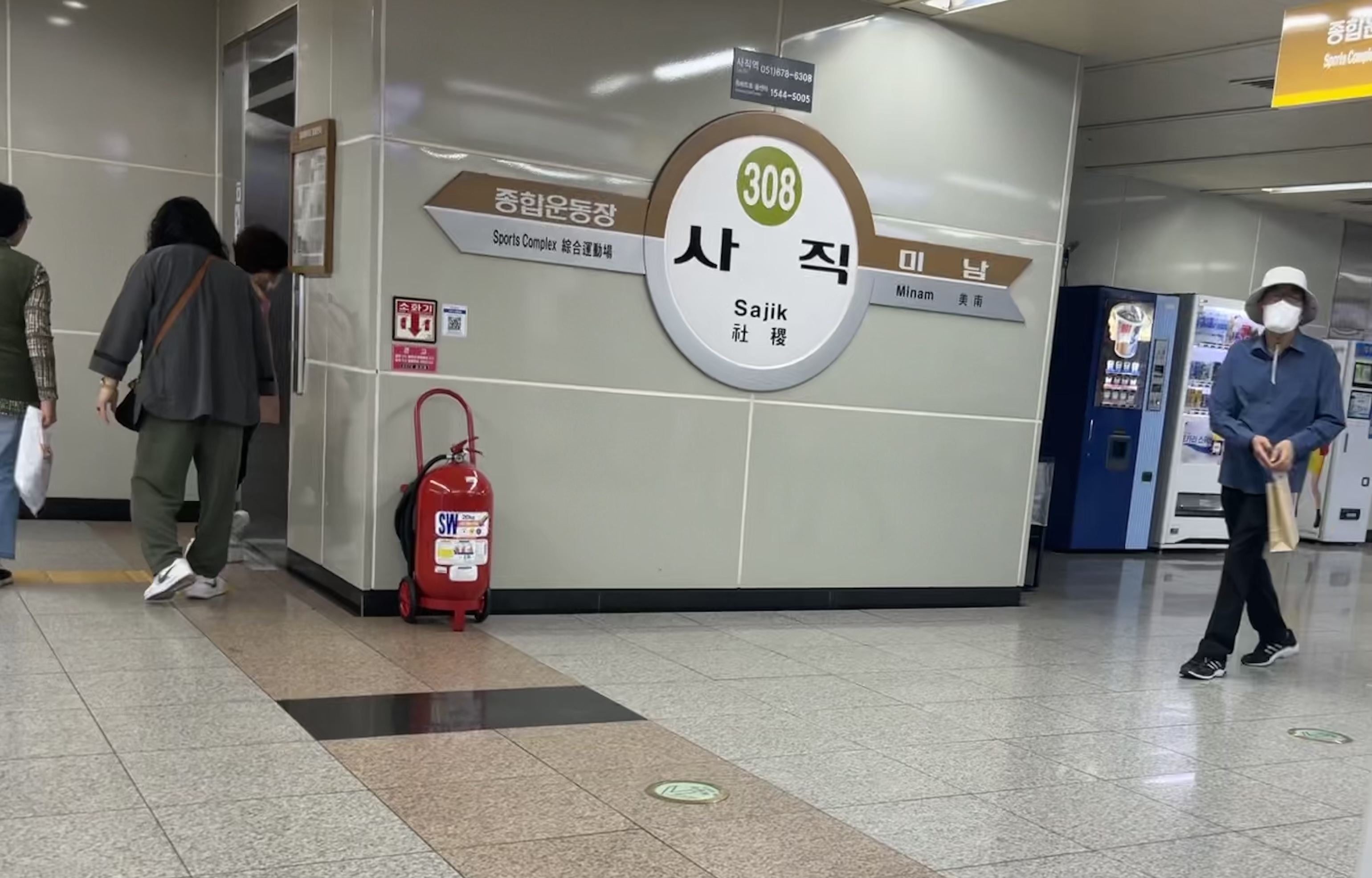

Korean name
- Hangul: 사직역
- Hanja: 社稷驛
- Revised Romanization: Sajik yeok
- McCune–Reischauer: Sachik yŏk

General information
- Location: Sajik-dong, Dongnae District, Busan; South Korea
- Coordinates: 35.1990°N 129.0651°E
- Operator: Busan Transportation Corporation
- Line: Busan Metro Line 3
- Platforms: 2
- Tracks: 2

Construction
- Structure type: Underground

Other information
- Station code: 308

History
- Opened: November 28, 2005

Services
Preceding station	Busan Metro	Following station
Sports Complex towards Suyeong	Line 3	Minam towards Daejeo
Location

Sajik Station (Korean: 사직역; Hanja: 社稷驛) is a station of Busan Metro Line 3 in Sajik-dong, Dongnae District, Busan, South Korea. It is associated with the Busan Sajik Baseball Stadium, home of the Lotte Giants.
