= Geumsahoedong-dong =

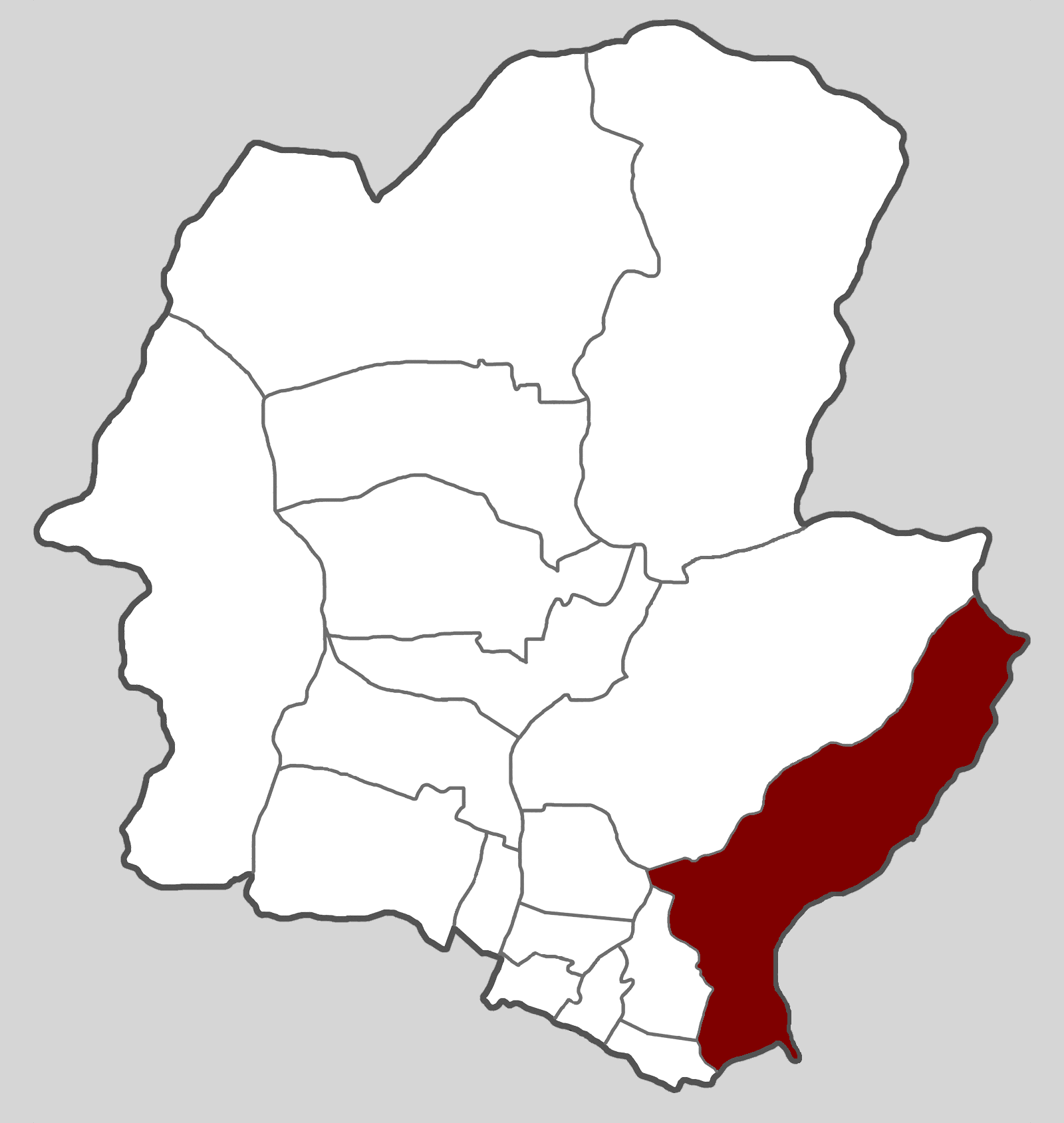
- Coordinates: 35°13′47.14″N 129°7′21.83″E
- Country: South Korea
- Administrative divisions: 1 administrative dong

Area
  - Total: 5.52 km^{2} (2.13 sq mi)

Population (2011)
  - Total: 10,660
  - Density: 1,931/km^{2} (5,000/sq mi)

Korean name
- Hangul: 금사회동동
- Hanja: 錦絲回東洞
- RR: Geumsahoedong-dong
- MR: Kŭmsahoedong-dong

Geumsahoedong-dong (Korean: 금사회동동) is a dong (neighborhood) in Geumjeong District, Busan, South Korea. It encompasses the entirety of Geumsa-dong and Hoedong-dong, both of which are administrative subdivisions.

Geumsahoedong-dong is situated in the northeastern part of Busan, an area characterized by a mix of residential neighborhoods and local commerce. The district is well-connected by public transportation, including the Busan Metro Line 4, which serves the region.

== See also ==
- Geography of South Korea
- Administrative divisions of South Korea
