= Bansong-dong =

Neighborhood in Busan, South Korea

Coordinates: 35°13′52″N 129°09′09″E

- Hangul: 반송동
- Hanja: 盤松洞
- RR: Bansong-dong
- MR: Pansong-dong

Bansong-dong (Korean: 반송동) is a dong (neighborhood) located in Haeundae District, Busan, South Korea. It is named for the ban-song (Pinus densiflora for. Multicaulis) a small pine tree still plentiful in the area. Encircled by (and encircling) hills north of Mt. Jang (Jangsan, 장산) and away from the famous Haeundae Beach, Bansong-dong has not participated in the economic growth experienced elsewhere in Haeundae District. The population of the three administrative dong (Bansong 1-dong, Bansong 2-dong and Bansong 3-dong) which make up Bansong-dong is 59,000.

== Notable people from Bansong-dong ==
- Kyungri (Real Name: Park Gyeong-ree, Korean: 경리), South Korean singer, dancer, actress and K-pop idol, member of the South Korean K-pop girlgroup Nine Muses, its subunit Nine Muses A and a former member of the project group Nasty Nasty.

== Accident ==
- 2019 Busan Wildfire
