= Anpyeong station =

Station of the Busan Metro

414 안평 (고촌주택단지) Anpyeong (Gochon Housing Complex)
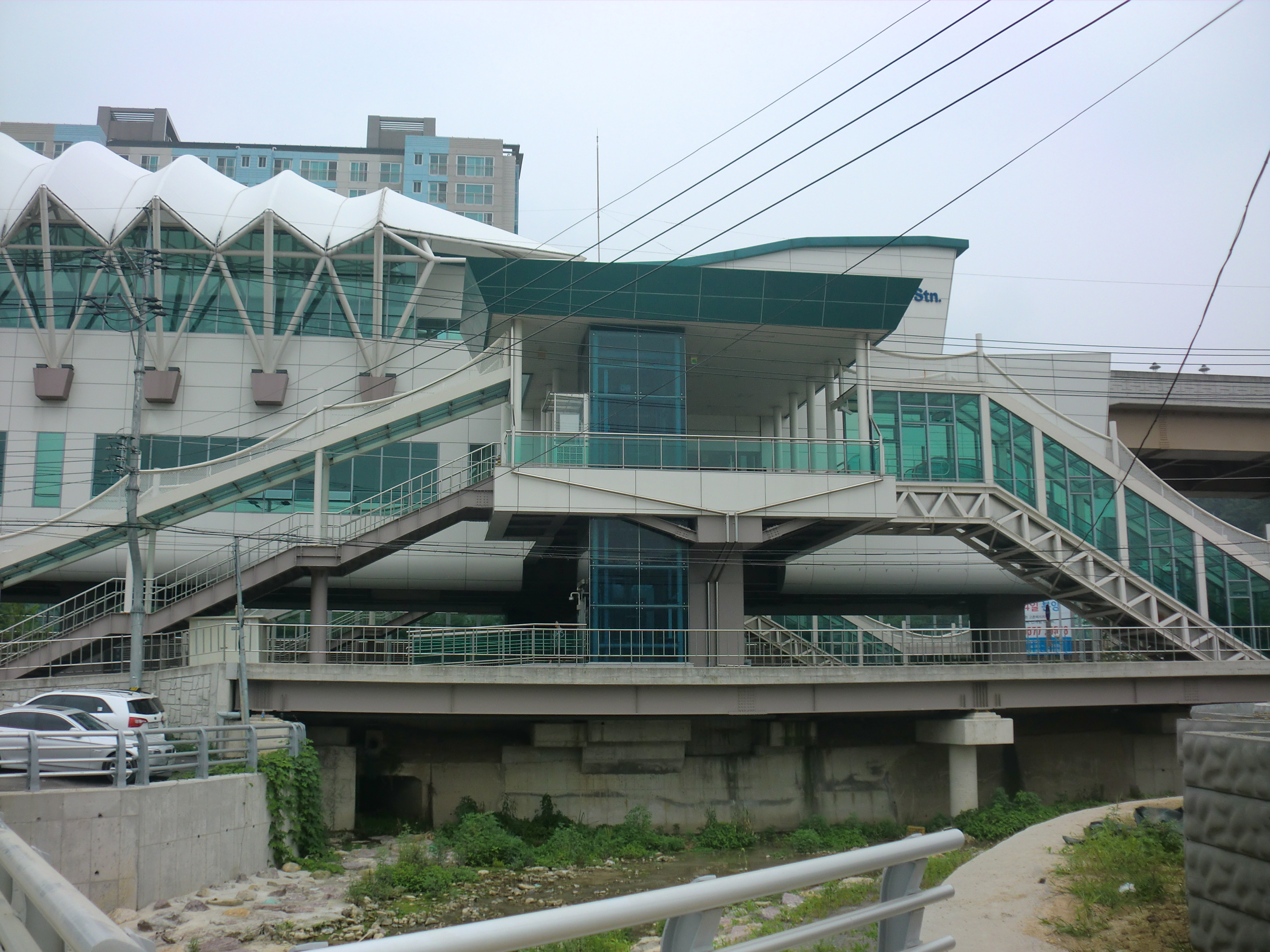

Korean name
- Hangul: 안평역
- Hanja: 安平驛
- RR: Anpyeong-yeok
- MR: Anp'yŏng-yŏk

General information
- Location: Cheolma-myeon, Gijang County, Busan; South Korea
- Coordinates: 35.2373°N 129.1718°E
- Operator: Busan Transportation Corporation
- Line: Line 4
- Platforms: 1
- Tracks: 2

Construction
- Structure type: Aboveground
- Parking: Yes (at Parking Lot)

Other information
- Station code: 414

History
- Opened: March 30, 2011

Services
Preceding station	Busan Metro	Following station
Gochon towards Minam	Line 4	Terminus
Location

Anpyeong station (Korean: 안평역; Hanja: 安平驛) is a station of the Busan Metro Line 4 in Cheolma-myeon, Gijang County, Busan, South Korea.

== Station Layout ==
L2; Platforms
L2; Platforms	Southbound	← Line 4 toward Minam (Gochon)
L2; Platforms	Island platform, doors will open on the left
L2; Platforms	Northbound	Line 4 Alighting Passengers Only →

L1; Concourse	Lobby	Customer Service, Shops, Vending machines, ATMs

G	Street level	Exit

== Gallery ==
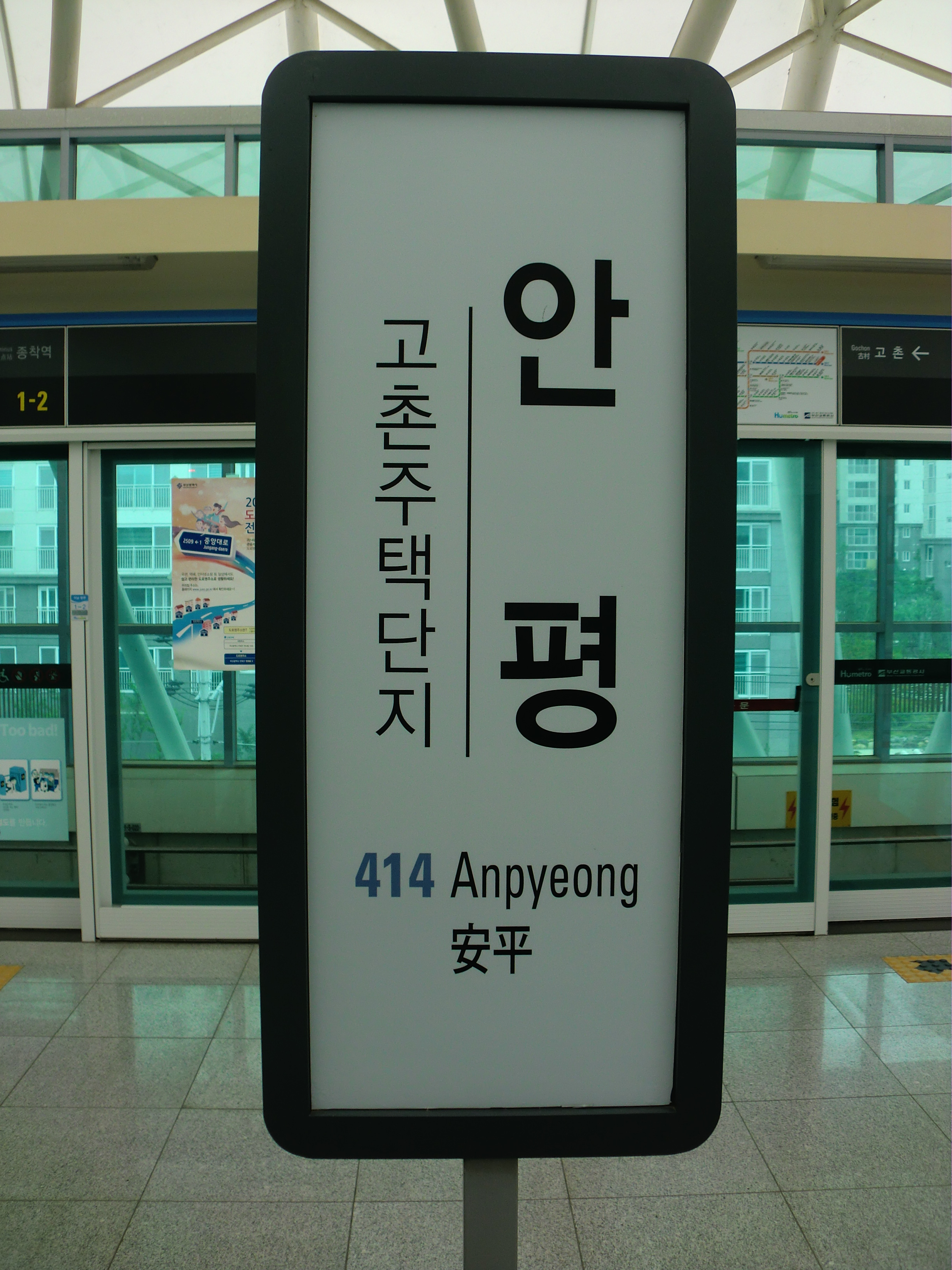
Anpyeong Station Sign

== Vicinity ==
- Exit 2: Anpyeong Station Parking Lot
