= Minam station =

Station of the Busan Metro

309 401 미남 (세화병원) Minam (Sehwa Hospital)
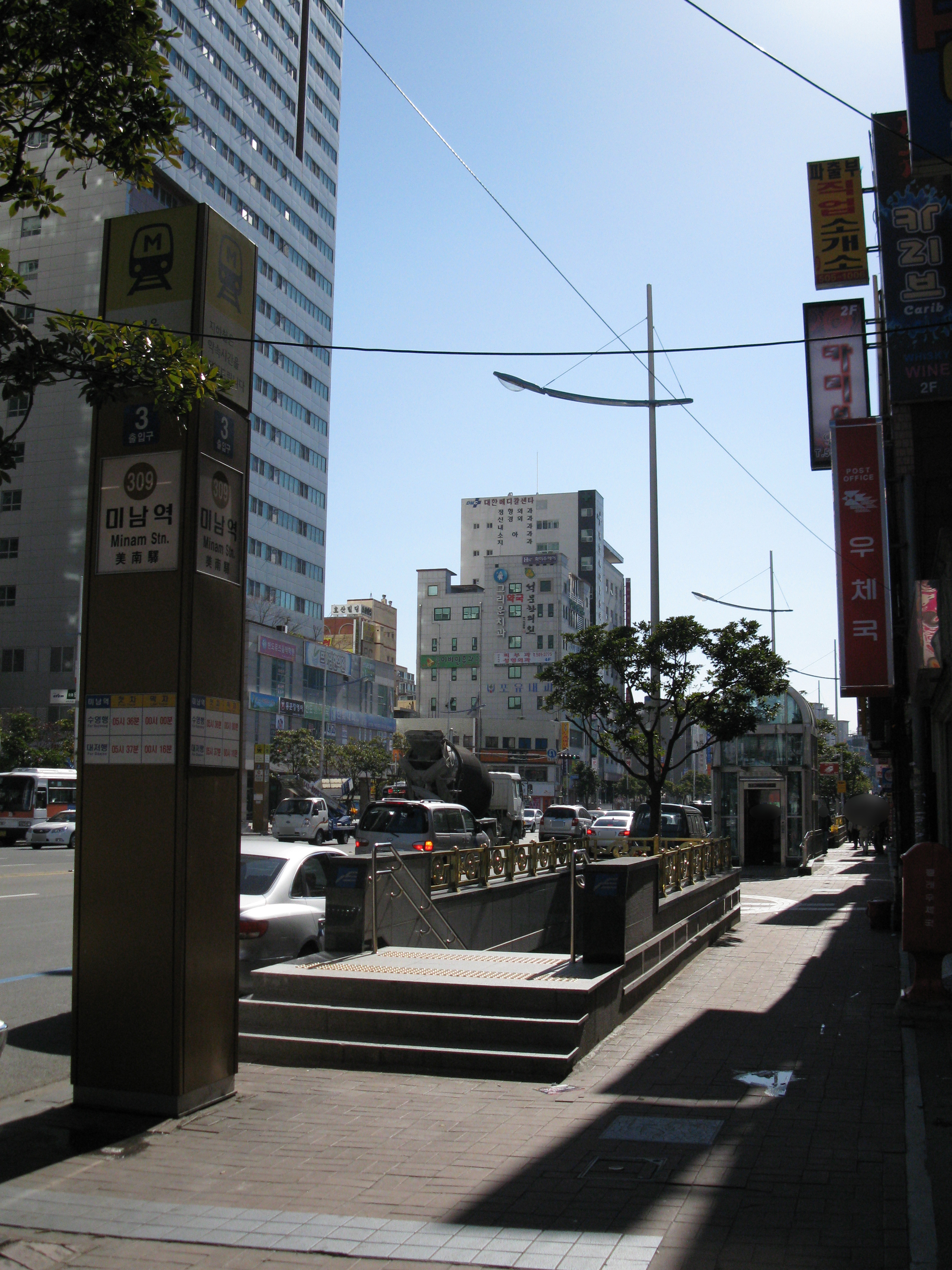
- Minam Station Entrance No. 3

Korean name
- Hangul: 미남역
- Hanja: 美南驛
- Revised Romanization: Minamnyeok
- McCune–Reischauer: Minamnyŏk

General information
- Location: Oncheon-dong, Dongnae District, Busan; South Korea
- Coordinates: 35°12′19.5″N 129°4′4.85″E
- Operator: Busan Transportation Corporation
- Lines: Line 3 Line 4
- Platforms: 1
- Tracks: 2

Construction
- Structure type: Underground
- Accessible: Yes

Other information
- Station code: ● Line 3: 309 ● Line 4: 401

History
- Opened: ● Line 3: November 28, 2005 ● Line 4: March 30, 2011

Services
Preceding station	Busan Metro	Following station
Sajik towards Suyeong	Line 3	Mandeok towards Daejeo
Terminus	Line 4	Dongnae towards Anpyeong
Location

Minam Station (Korean: 미남역; Hanja: 美南驛) is an underground station of Busan Metro Line 3 and Line 4 located in Oncheon-dong, Dongnae District, Busan.

== Station Layout ==
G	Street Level	Exits
L1; Concourse	Lobby	Customer Service, Shops, Vending machines, ATMs
Line 3 Platforms	Southbound	← Line 3 toward Suyeong (Sajik)
Line 3 Platforms	Island platform, doors open on the left
Line 3 Platforms	Northbound	Line 3 toward Daejeo (Mandeok) →
Line 4 Platforms	Southbound	← Line 4 Alighting Passengers Only
Line 4 Platforms	Island platform, doors open on the left
Line 4 Platforms	Northbound	Line 4 toward Anpyeong (Dongnae) →

== Gallery ==
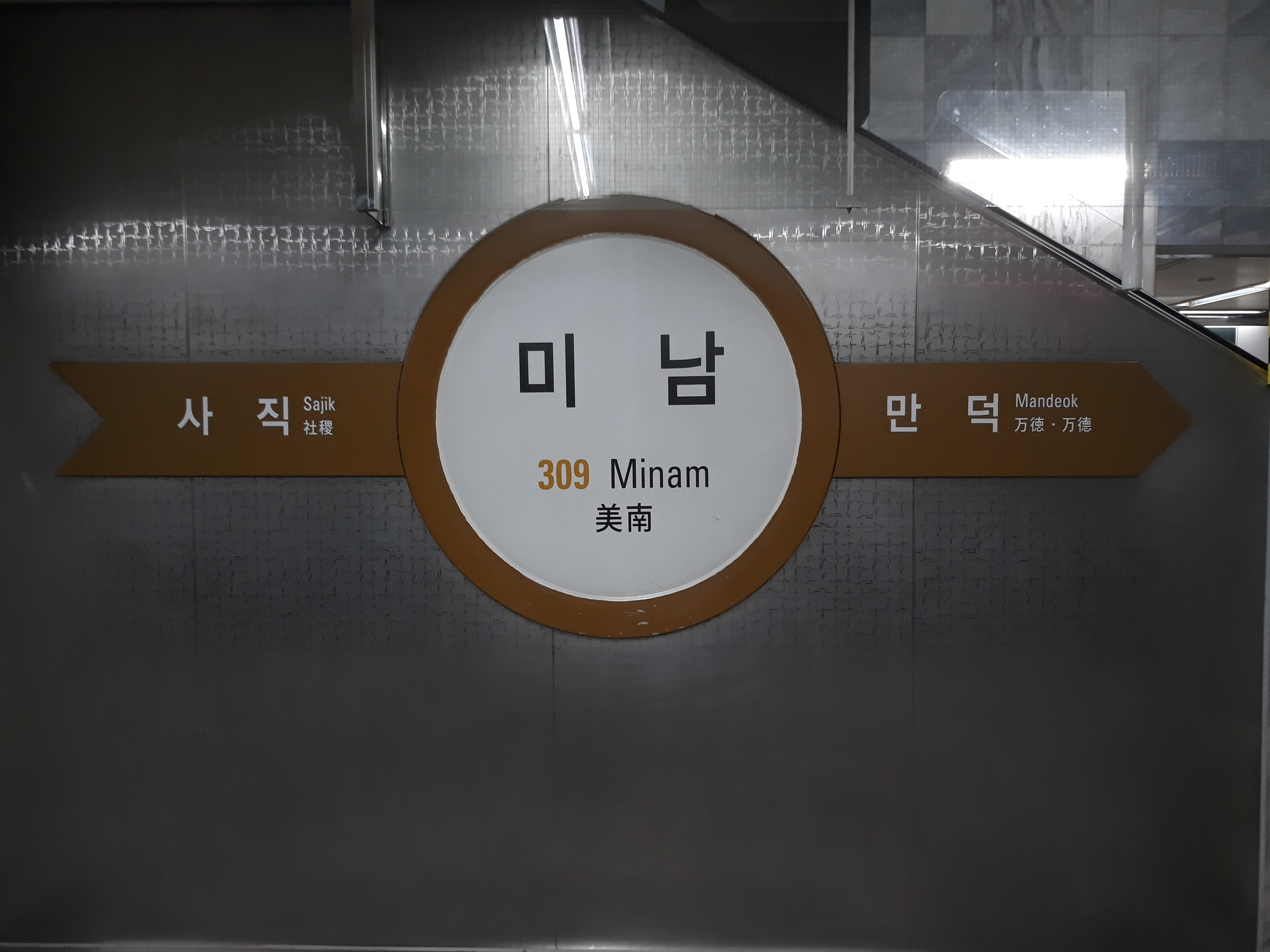
Station Sign (Line 3)

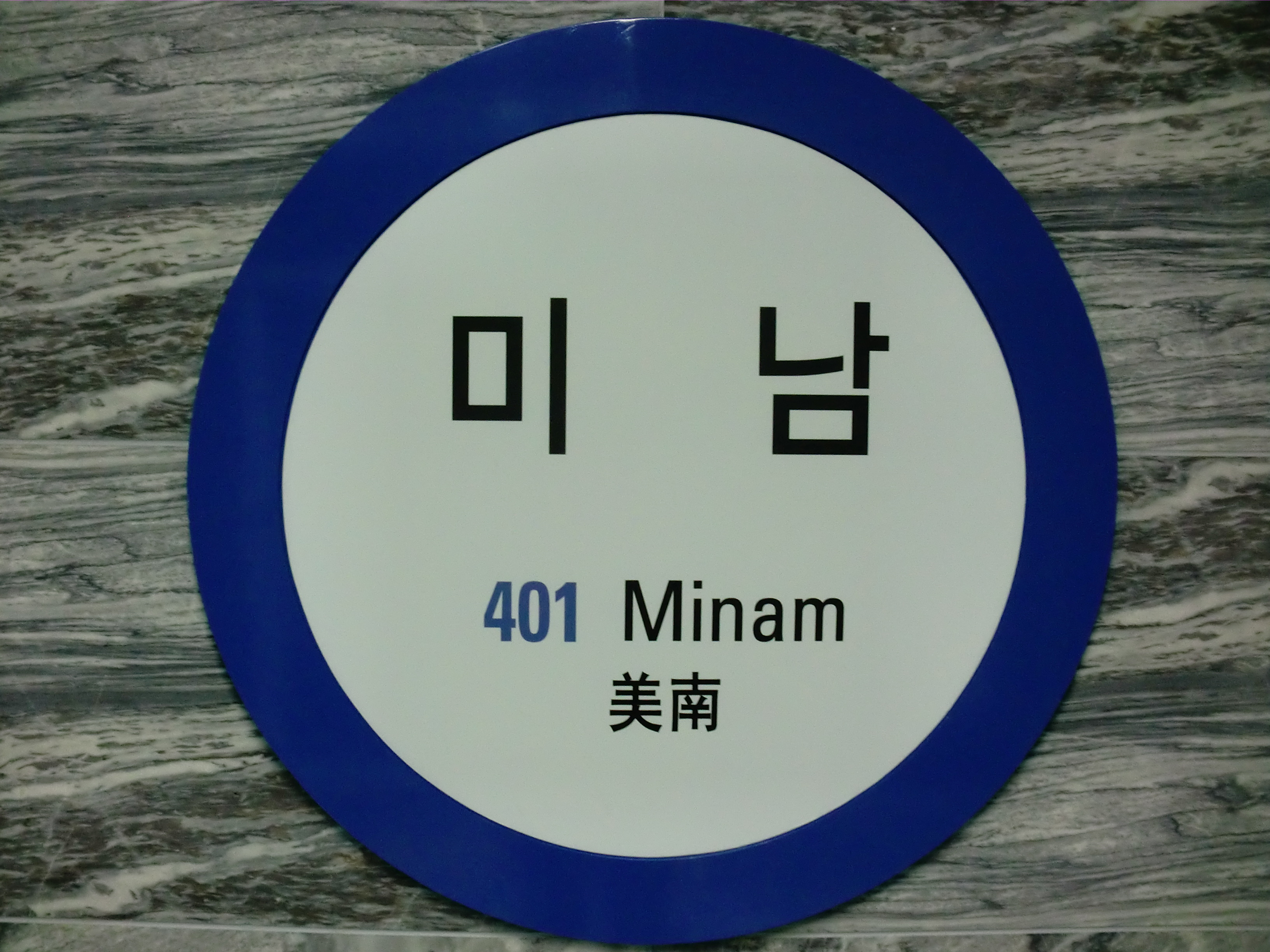
Station Sign (Line 4)
