= Busan Transportation Corporation =

Operator of Busan Metro, South Korea

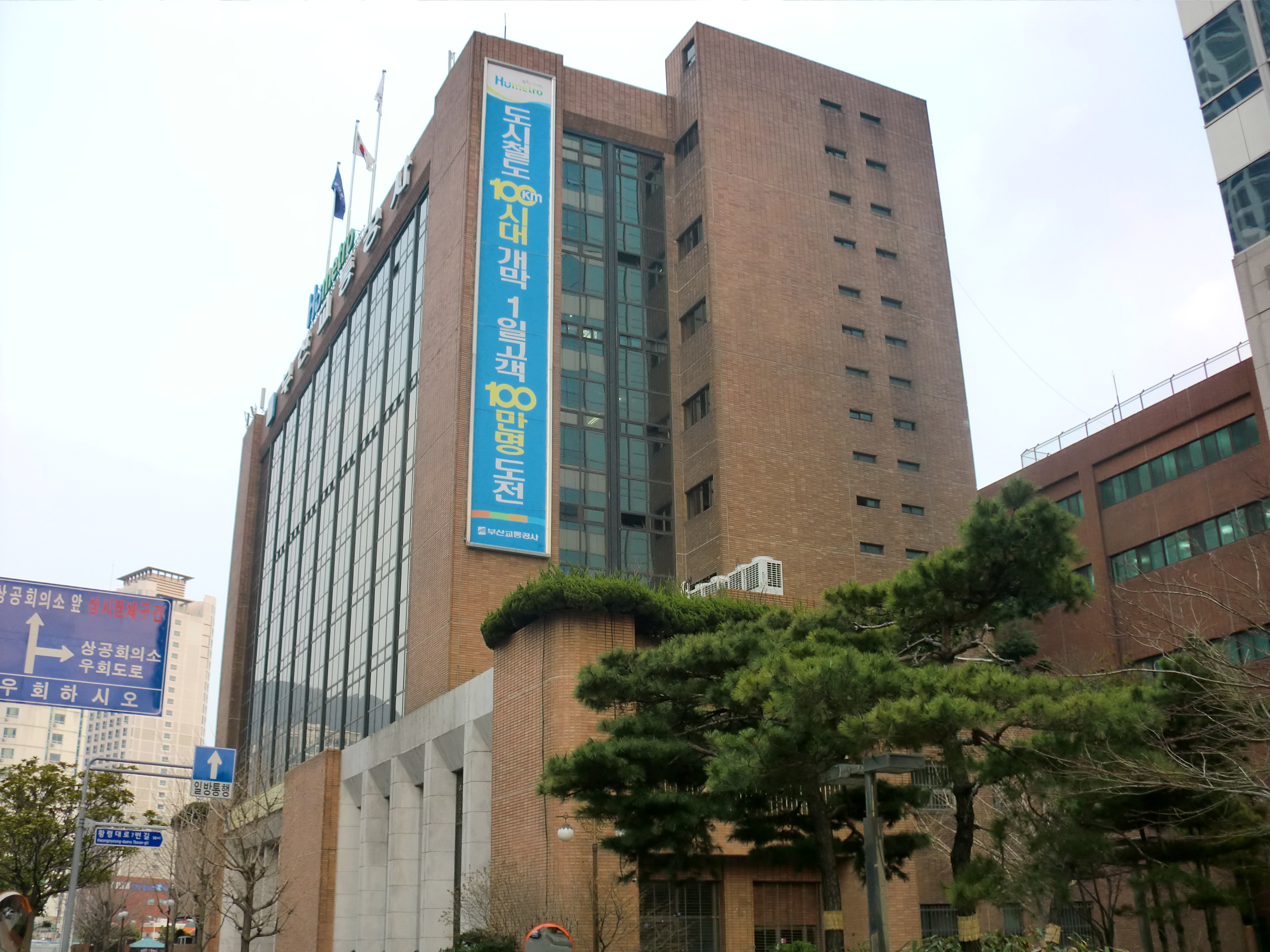
- The headquarters of the Busan Transportation Corporation, the operator of Lines 1-4
- Native name: 부산교통공사 (hangul) 釜山交通公社 (hanja)
- Industry: Rapid transit
- Founded: January 1, 2006
- Headquarters: 20 Jungang-daero 644beon-gil, Busanjin District, Busan, South Korea
- Website: www2.humetro.busan.kr

The Busan Transportation Corporation (Korean: 부산교통공사; Hanja: 釜山交通公社) is a South Korean transport company based in Busan, that was established on January 1, 2006, following the abolition of the Busan Urban Transit Authority founded in 1987.

The Busan Transportation Corporation currently operates the Busan Metro lines 1 to 4 and the Busan Gimhae light rail transit, both in Busan and Gimhae, South Korea.

Information about the routes is provided in Korean, English, Chinese, and Japanese.

== Background ==
The Corporation is governed by those of bureaucratic positions; with its system regulated by article 2 of the Auto Transportation Business Enforcement Law. It is responsible for all operations relating to the transportation system's construction and coherence. The corporation is led by the president, who oversees two departments (audit and safety & management) and four headquarters (planning, administration, general operations, and construction).

=== Logo ===
The Busan Transportation Corporation's logo depicts an image of a railway car in a square form.

== Social Activities ==
The corporation also own their own football club: Busan Transportation Corporation FC.

== See also ==
- Busan Subway
- Busan Subway Line 1
- Busan Subway Line 2
- Busan Subway Line 3
- Busan Subway Line 4
- Transportation in South Korea
- Busan Transportation Corporation FC
