= Saha station =

Station of the Busan Metro

Coordinates: 35°05′59″N 128°59′00″E

104 사하 Saha
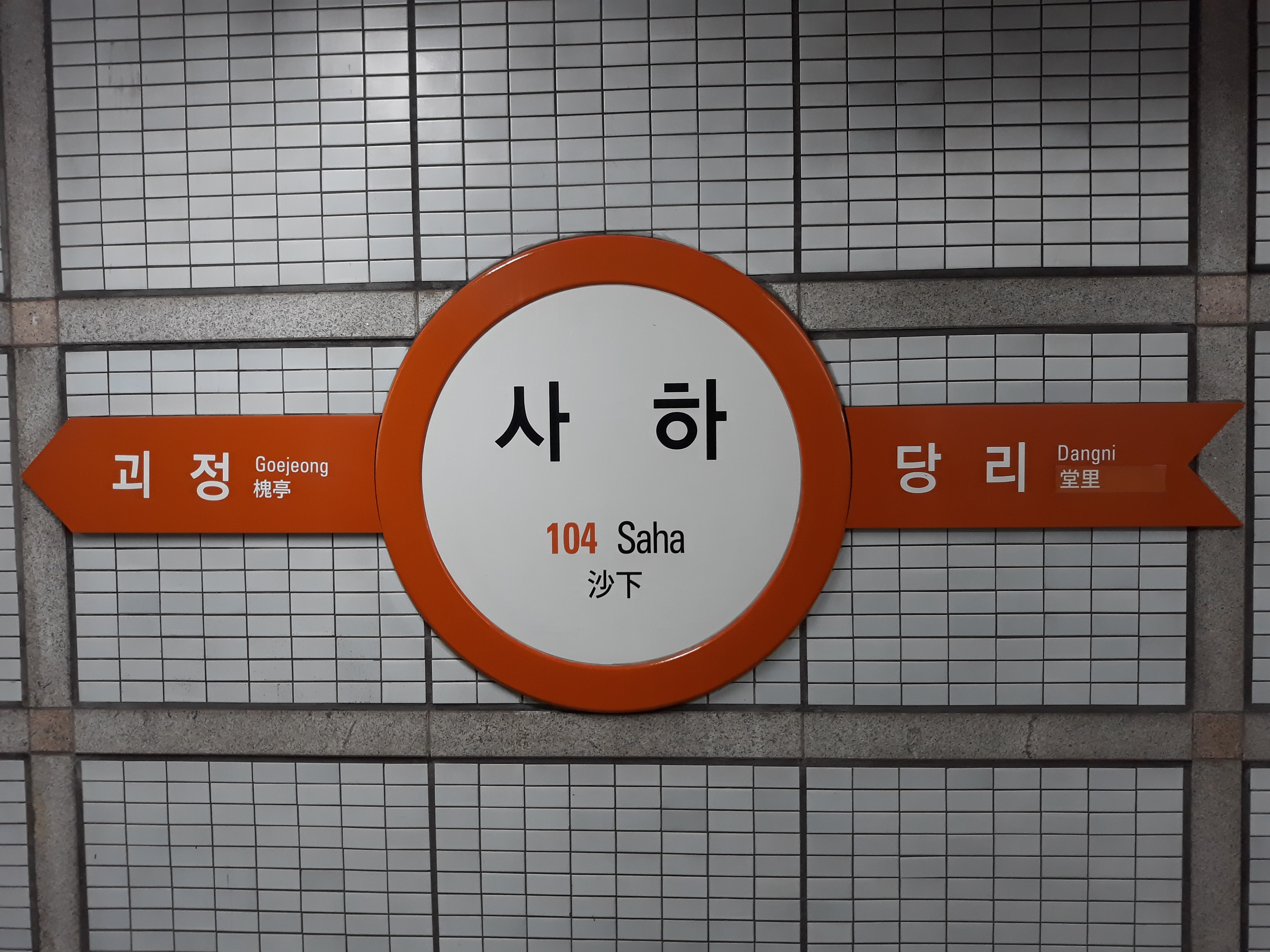
- Station Sign

Korean name
- Hangul: 사하역
- Hanja: 沙下驛
- Revised Romanization: Saha-yeok
- McCune–Reischauer: Saha-yŏk

General information
- Operator: Busan Transportation Corporation
- Line: Line 1
- Platforms: 2
- Tracks: 2

Construction
- Structure type: Underground

History
- Opened: June 23, 1994; 32 years ago

Services
Preceding station	Busan Metro	Following station
Dangni towards Dadaepo Beach	Line 1	Goejeong towards Nopo
Location

Saha Station is a metro station of Busan Subway Line 1 located in Saha-gu, Busan, South Korea.

== History ==
The station was opened on June 23, 1994.
