= Sinjangnim station =

Station of the Busan Metro

098 신장림 Sinjangnim
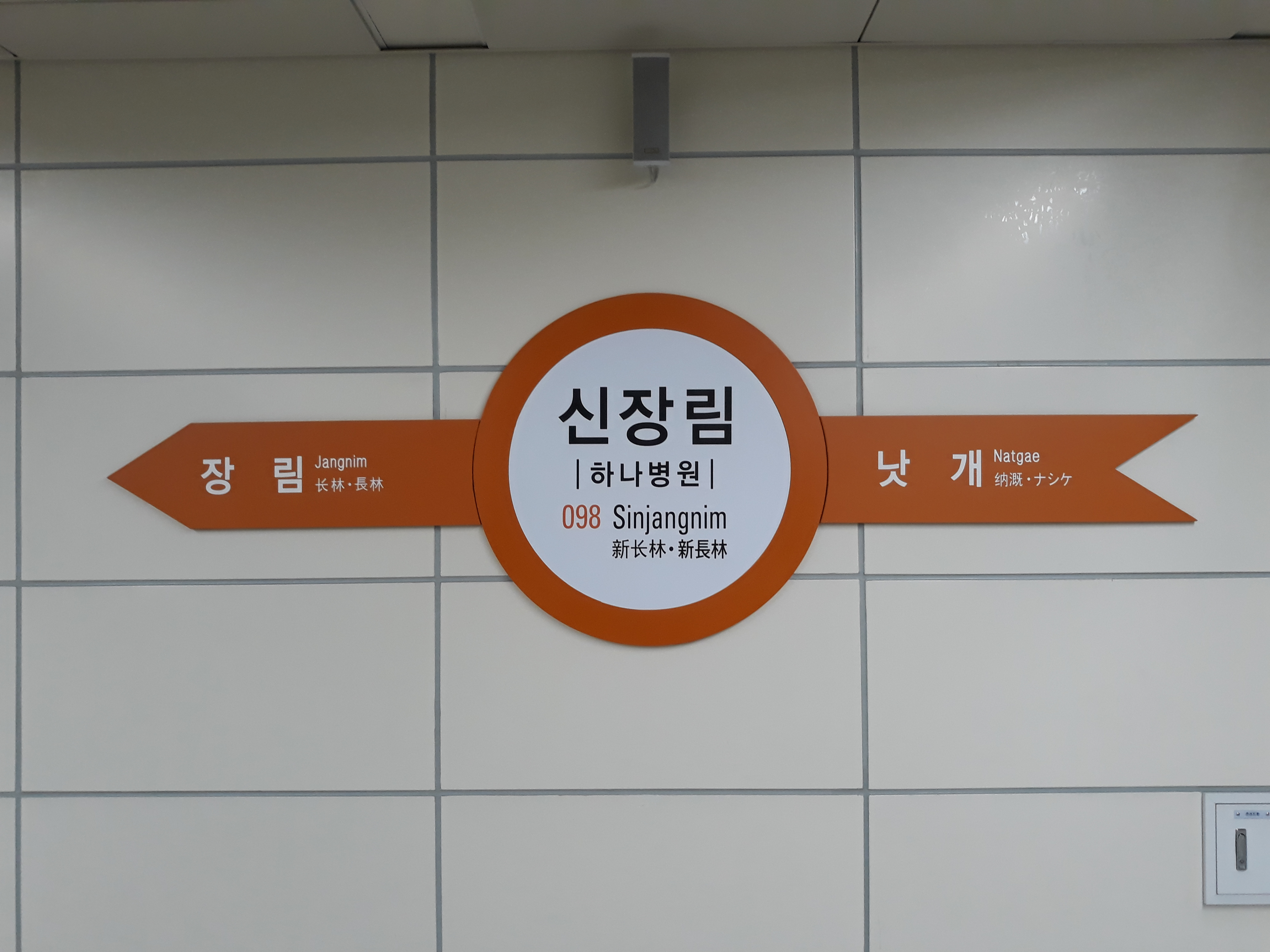

Korean name
- Hangul: 신장림역
- Hanja: 新長林驛
- Revised Romanization: Sinjangnim yeok
- McCune–Reischauer: Sinchangnim yŏk

General information
- Location: Jangrim-dong, Saha District, Busan; South Korea
- Coordinates: 35.0746°N 128.9766°E
- Operator: Busan Transportation Corporation
- Line: Line 1
- Platforms: 2
- Tracks: 2

Construction
- Structure type: Underground

Other information
- Station code: 098

History
- Opened: April 20, 2017; 9 years ago

Services
Preceding station	Busan Metro	Following station
Natgae towards Dadaepo Beach	Line 1	Jangnim towards Nopo
Location

Sinjangnim Station (Korean: 신장림역; Hanja: 新長林驛) is a station of the Busan Metro Line 1 in Jangrim-dong, Saha District, Busan, South Korea.

== Station Layout ==
G	Street level	Exit

L1; Concourse	Lobby	Customer Service, Shops, Vending machines, ATMs

L2; Platforms	Side platform, doors will open on the right
L2; Platforms	Southbound	← Line 1 toward Dadaepo Beach (Natgae)
L2; Platforms	Northbound	Line 1 toward Nopo (Jangnim)→
L2; Platforms	Side platform, doors will open on the right
