= Natgae station =

Station of the Busan Metro

097 낫개 Natgae
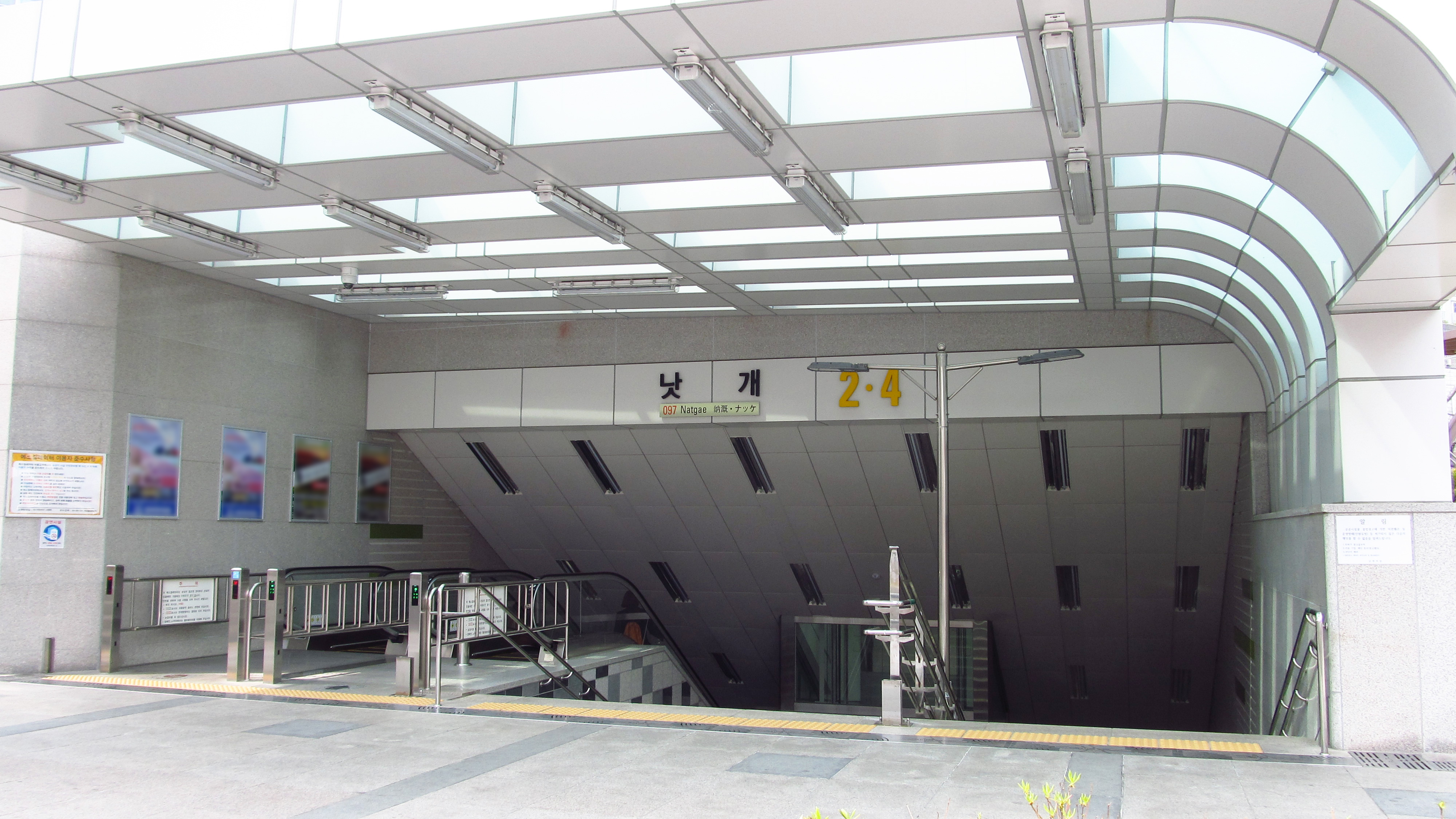
- Entrance No.2 and No.4 Station

Korean name
- Hangul: 낫개역
- Hanja: 낫개驛
- Revised Romanization: Natgae yeok
- McCune–Reischauer: Natkae yŏk

General information
- Location: Dadae-dong, Saha District, Busan; South Korea
- Coordinates: 35.0653°N 128.9796°E
- Operator: Busan Transportation Corporation
- Line: Line 1
- Platforms: 2
- Tracks: 2

Construction
- Structure type: Underground

Other information
- Station code: 097

History
- Opened: April 20, 2017; 9 years ago

Services
Preceding station	Busan Metro	Following station
Dadaepo Harbor towards Dadaepo Beach	Line 1	Sinjangnim towards Nopo
Location

Natgae Station (Korean: 낫개역; Hanja: 낫개驛) is a station of the Busan Metro Line 1 in Dadae-dong, Saha District, Busan, South Korea.

== Station Layout ==
G	Street level	Exit

L1; Concourse	Lobby	Customer Service, Shops, Vending machines, ATMs

L2; Platforms	Side platform, doors will open on the right
L2; Platforms	Southbound	← Line 1 toward Dadaepo Beach (Dadaepo Harbor)
L2; Platforms	Northbound	Line 1 toward Nopo (Sinjangnim)→
L2; Platforms	Side platform, doors will open on the right
