= Jangnim station =

Station of the Busan Metro

099 장림 Jangnim
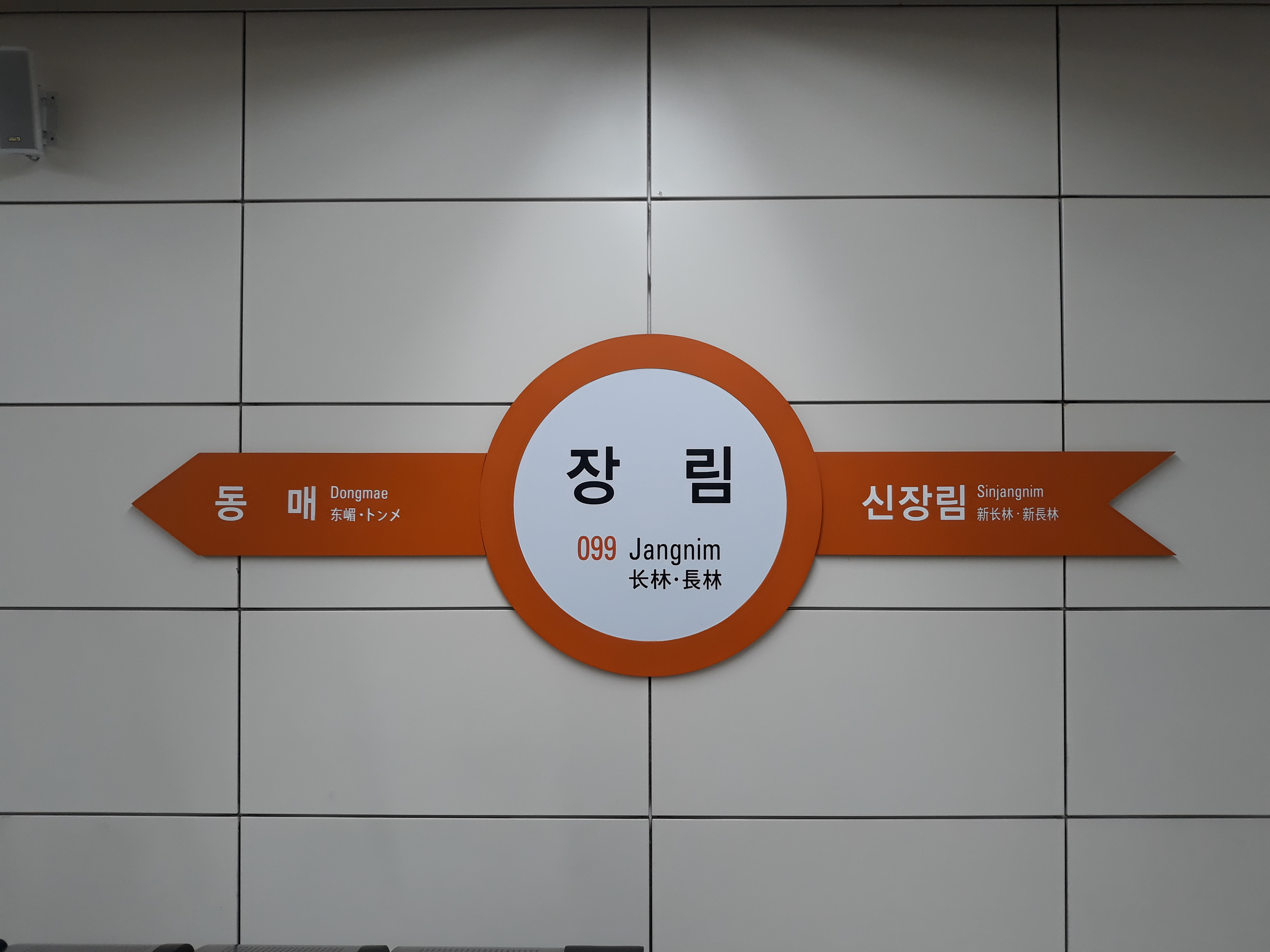

Korean name
- Hangul: 장림역
- Hanja: 長林驛
- Revised Romanization: Jangnim yeok
- McCune–Reischauer: Changnim yŏk

General information
- Location: Jangnim-dong, Saha District, Busan; South Korea
- Coordinates: 35.0819°N 128.9774°E
- Operator: Busan Transportation Corporation
- Line: Line 1
- Platforms: 2
- Tracks: 2

Construction
- Structure type: Underground

Other information
- Station code: 099

History
- Opened: April 20, 2017; 9 years ago

Services
| Preceding station | Busan Metro | Following station |
|---|---|---|
| Sinjangnim towards Dadaepo Beach | Line 1 | Dongmae towards Nopo |
Location

Jangnim Station (Korean: 장림역; Hanja: 長林驛) is a station of the Busan Metro Line 1 in Jangnim-dong, Saha District, Busan, South Korea.

== Station Layout ==
↑ Dongmae
N/B | | S/B
Sinjangnim ↓

| Northbound | ● Line 1 toward Nopo → |
| Southbound | ← ● Line 1 toward Dadaepo Beach |
