= Daeti station =

Station of the Busan Metro

106 대티 Daeti
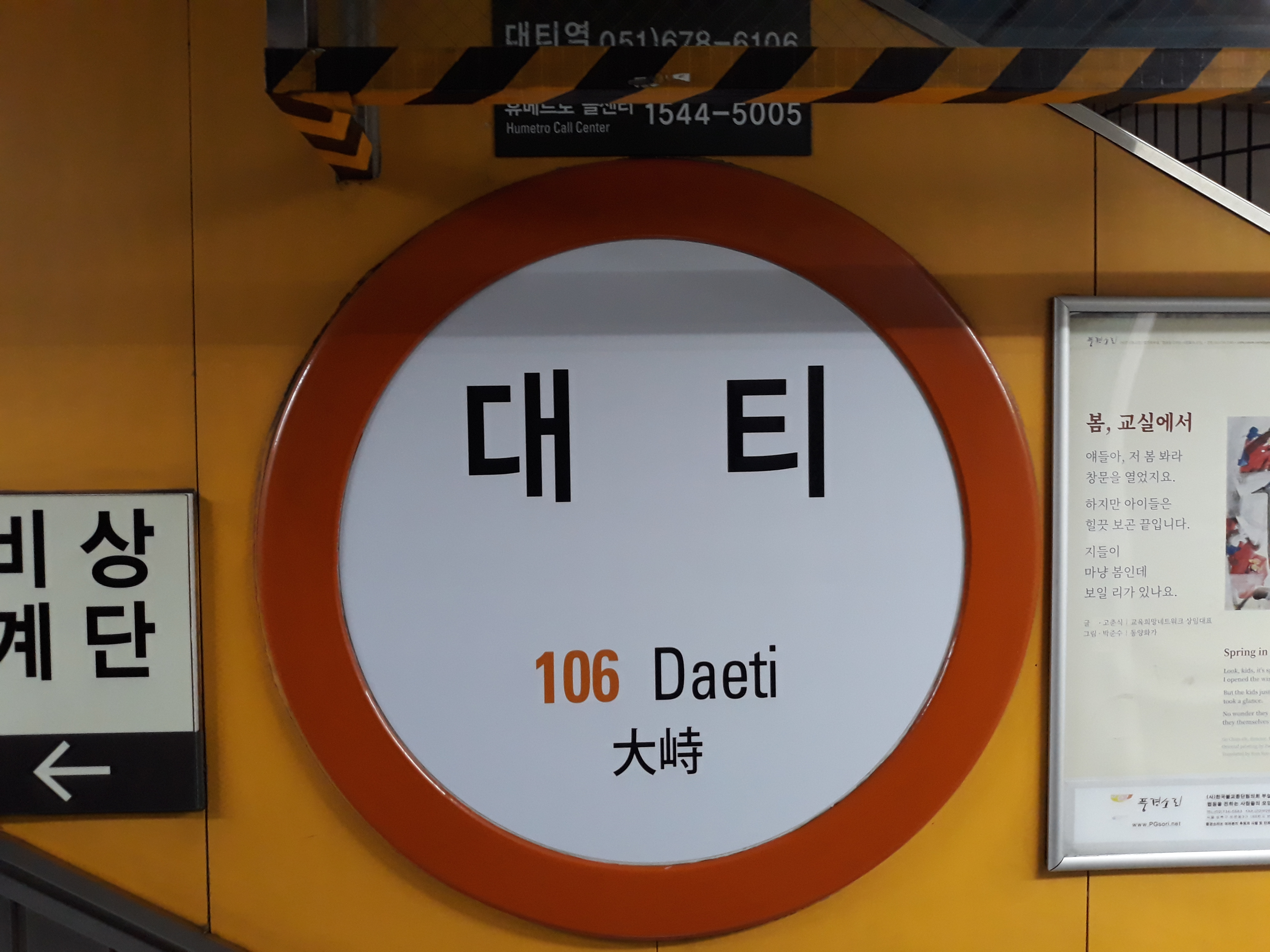

Korean name
- Hangul: 대티역
- Hanja: 大峙驛
- Revised Romanization: Daetiyeok
- McCune–Reischauer: Taet'iyŏk

General information
- Location: Goejeong-dong, Saha District, Busan; South Korea
- Coordinates: 35°06′11″N 128°59′59″E
- Operator: Busan Transportation Corporation
- Line: Busan Metro Line 1
- Platforms: 1
- Tracks: 2

Construction
- Structure type: Underground

Other information
- Station code: 106

History
- Opened: June 23, 1994; 32 years ago

Services
Preceding station	Busan Metro	Following station
Goejeong towards Dadaepo Beach	Line 1	Seodaesin towards Nopo
Location

Daeti Station is a station of the Busan Metro Line 1 in Goejeong-dong, Saha District, Busan, South Korea. It takes about 14 minutes to get from Daeti Station to Busan Station and the subway usually arrives every 10 minutes.
