= Goejeong station =

Station of the Busan Metro

105 괴정 Goejeong
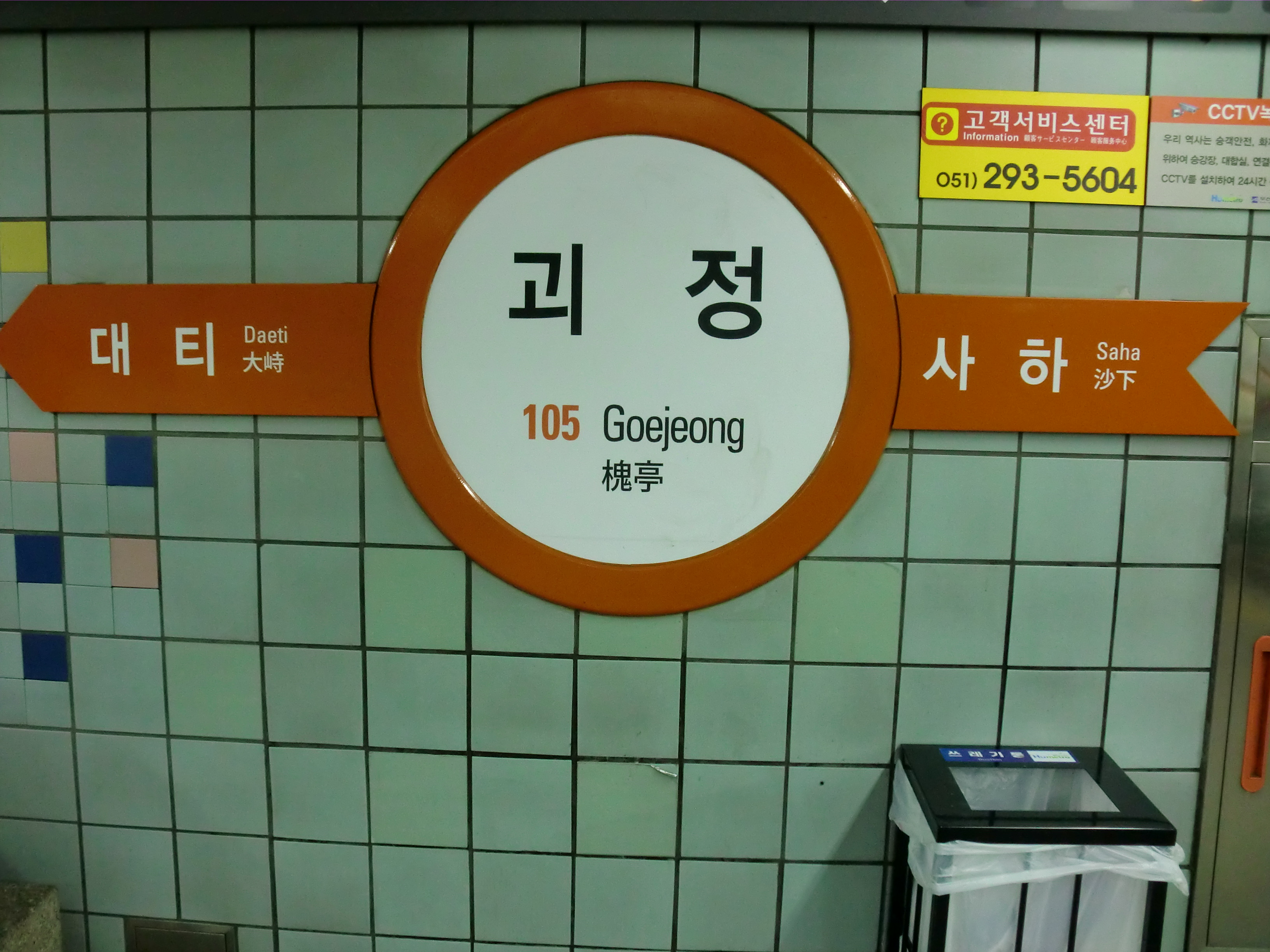

Korean name
- Hangul: 괴정역
- Hanja: 槐亭驛
- Revised Romanization: Goejeongnyeok
- McCune–Reischauer: Koejŏngnyŏk

General information
- Location: Goejeong-dong, Saha District, Busan; South Korea
- Coordinates: 35°06′00″N 128°59′33″E
- Operator: Busan Transportation Corporation
- Line: Line 1
- Platforms: 2
- Tracks: 2

Construction
- Structure type: Underground

Other information
- Station code: 105

History
- Opened: June 23, 1994; 32 years ago

Services
Preceding station	Busan Metro	Following station
Saha towards Dadaepo Beach	Line 1	Daeti towards Nopo
Location

Goejeong Station is a station of the Busan Metro Line 1 in Goejeong-dong, Saha District, Busan, South Korea.
