= Dongmae station =

Station of the Busan Metro

100 동매 Dongmae
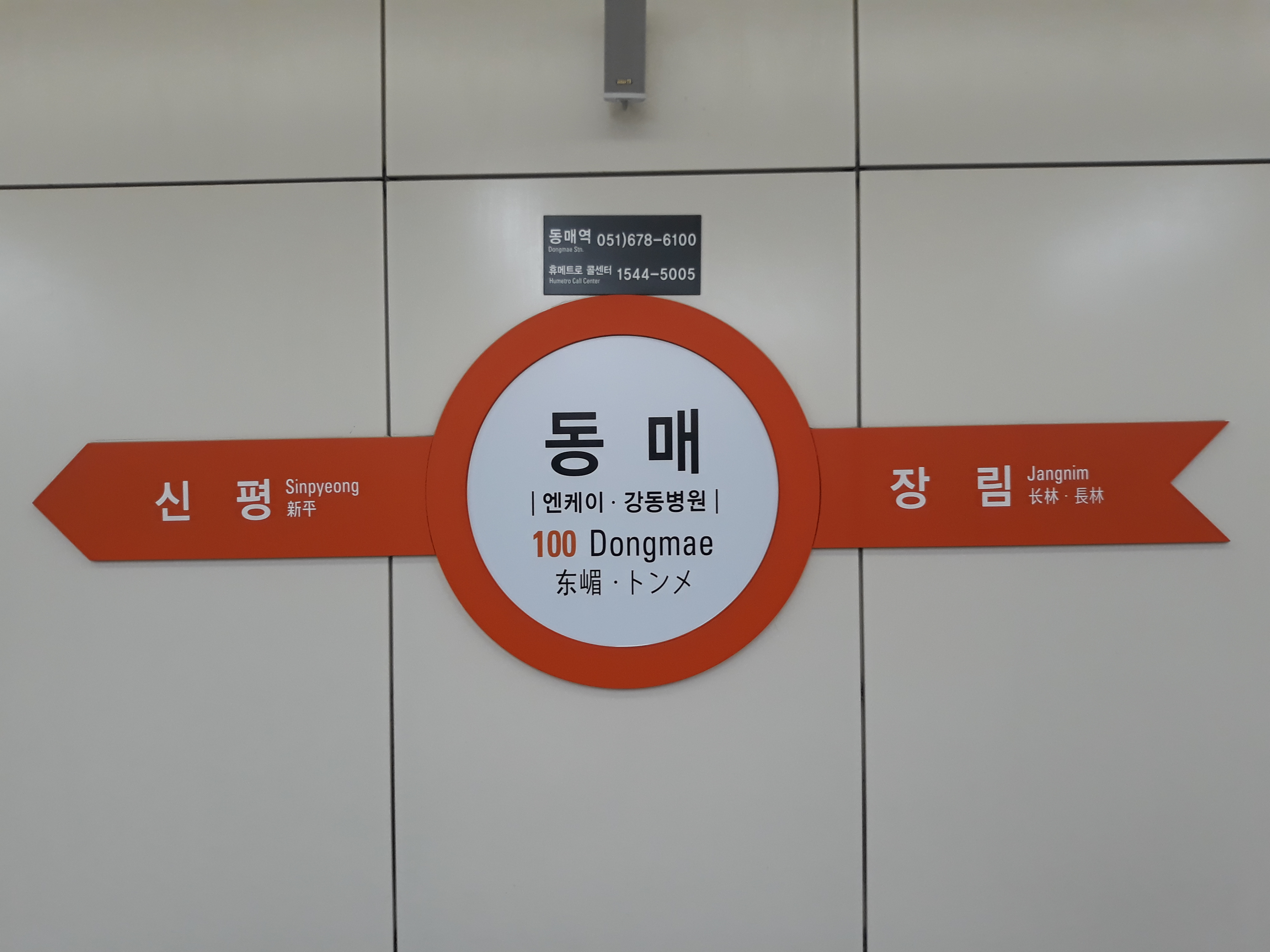

Korean name
- Hangul: 동매역
- Hanja: 동매驛
- Revised Romanization: Dongmae yeok
- McCune–Reischauer: Tongmae yŏk

General information
- Location: Sinpyeong-dong, Saha District, Busan; South Korea
- Coordinates: 35.0898°N 128.9736°E
- Operator: Busan Transportation Corporation
- Line: Line 1
- Platforms: 2
- Tracks: 2

Construction
- Structure type: Underground

Other information
- Station code: 100

History
- Opened: April 20, 2017; 9 years ago

Services
Preceding station	Busan Metro	Following station
Jangnim towards Dadaepo Beach	Line 1	Sinpyeong towards Nopo
Location

Dongmae Station (Korean: 동매역; Hanja: 동매驛) is a station of the Busan Metro Line 1 in Sinpyeong-dong, Saha District, Busan, South Korea.
