= Dangni station =

Station of the Busan Metro

103 당리 (사하구청) Dangni (Saha-gu Office)
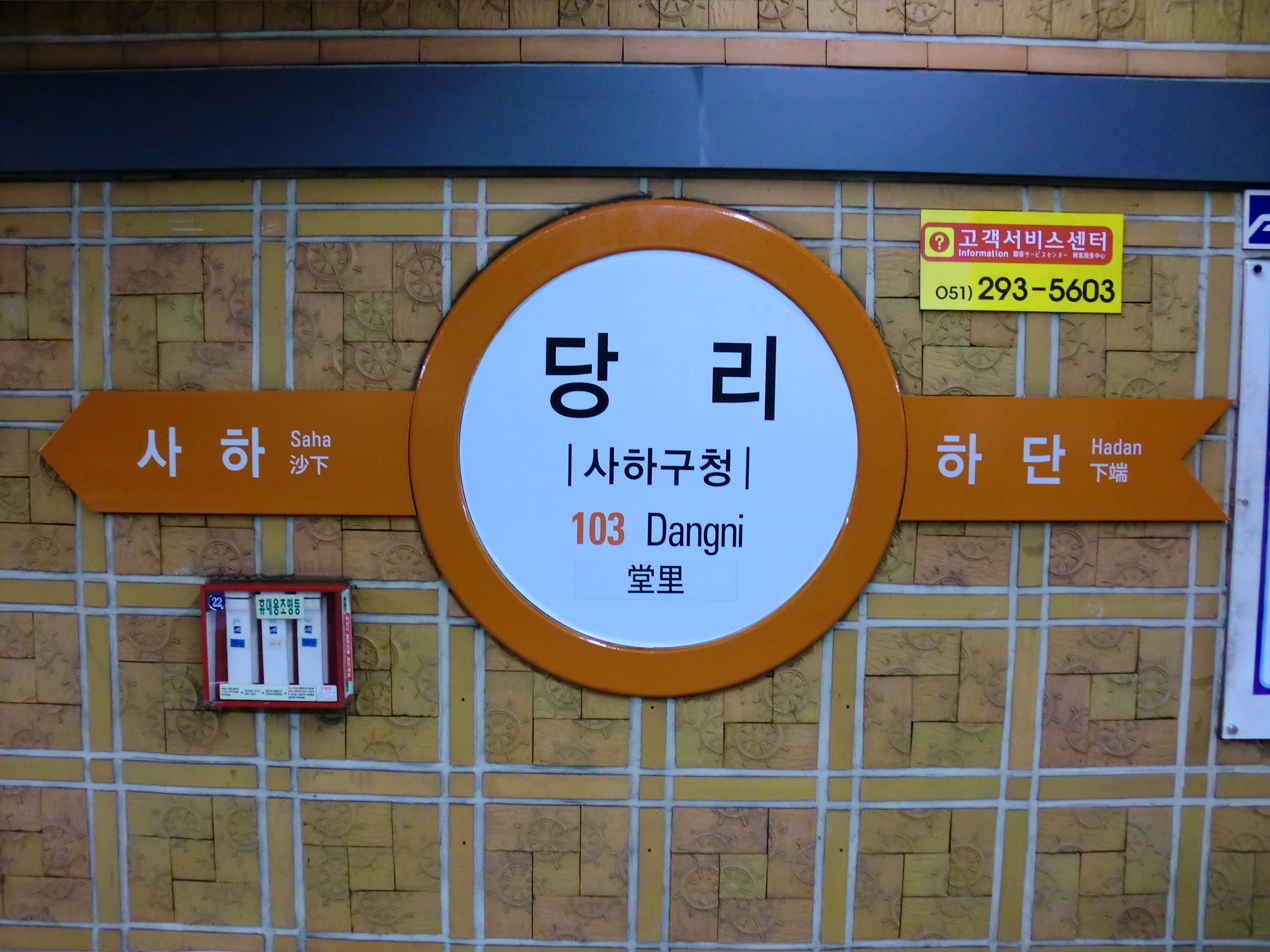
- Station Sign

Korean name
- Hangul: 당리역
- Hanja: 堂里驛
- Revised Romanization: Dangniyeok
- McCune–Reischauer: Tangniyŏk

General information
- Location: Dangni-dong, Saha District, Busan; South Korea
- Coordinates: 35.103444°N 128.974085°E
- Operator: Busan Transportation Corporation
- Line: Line 1
- Platforms: 2
- Tracks: 2

Construction
- Structure type: Underground

Other information
- Station code: 103

History
- Opened: June 23, 1994; 32 years ago

Services
Preceding station	Busan Metro	Following station
Hadan towards Dadaepo Beach	Line 1	Saha towards Nopo
Location

Dangni station (Korean: 당리역) is a subway station of Busan Metro Line 1 located in Saha District, Busan, South Korea. It opened on June 23, 1994.
