= Guseo station =

Station of the Busan Metro

130 구서 Guseo
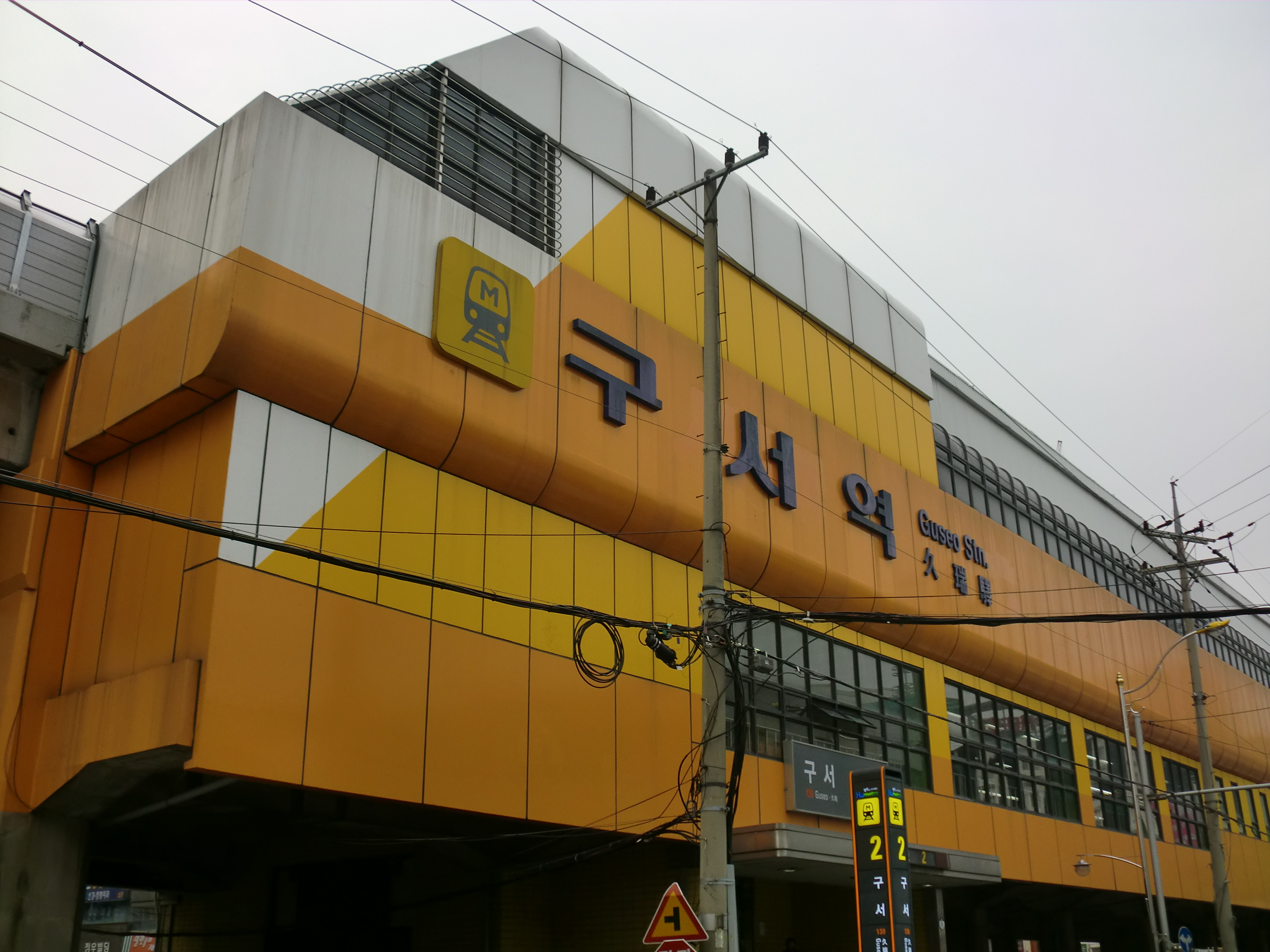

Korean name
- Hangul: 구서역
- Hanja: 久瑞驛
- Revised Romanization: Guseo-yeok
- McCune–Reischauer: Kusŏ-yŏk

General information
- Location: Guseo-dong, Geumjeong District, Busan; South Korea
- Coordinates: 35°14′50″N 129°05′29″E
- Operator: Busan Transportation Corporation
- Line: Line 1
- Platforms: 2
- Tracks: 2

Construction
- Structure type: Elevated

Other information
- Station code: 130

History
- Opened: July 19, 1985

Services
Preceding station	Busan Metro	Following station
Jangjeon towards Dadaepo Beach	Line 1	Dusil towards Nopo
Location

Guseo Station (Korean: 구서역) is a station of the Busan Metro Line 1 in Guseo-dong, Geumjeong District, Busan, South Korea.

== Station Layout ==
G	Street level	Exit

L1; Concourse	Lobby	Customer Service, Shops, Vending machines, ATMs

L2; Platforms	Side platform, doors will open on the right
L2; Platforms	Southbound	← Line 1 toward Dadaepo Beach (Jangjeon)
L2; Platforms	Northbound	Line 1 toward Nopo (Dusil)→
L2; Platforms	Side platform, doors will open on the right
