= Beomeosa station =

Station of the Busan Metro

133 범어사 Beomeosa
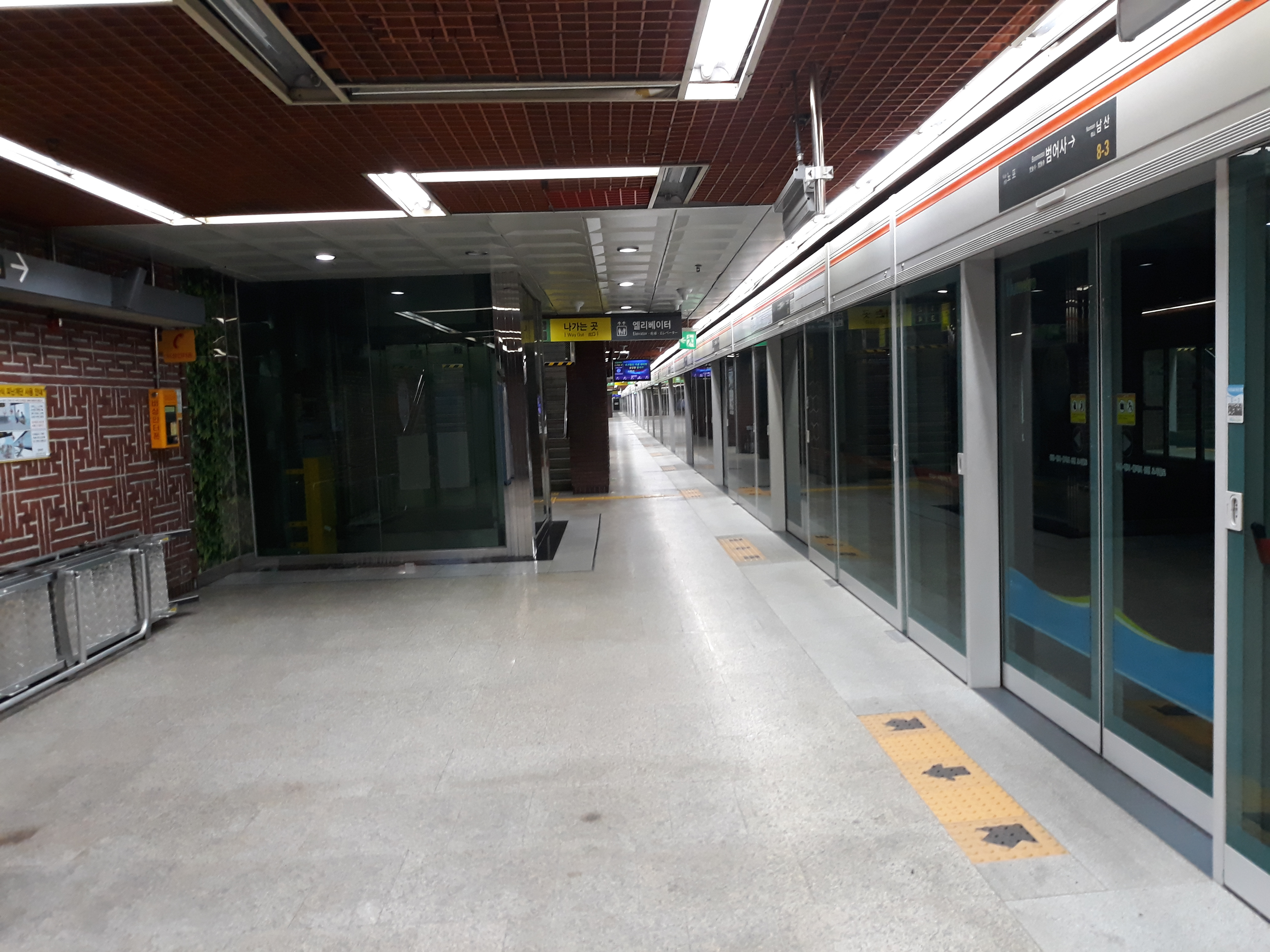

Korean name
- Hangul: 범어사역
- Hanja: 梵魚寺驛
- Revised Romanization: Beomeosa-yeok
- McCune–Reischauer: Pŏmŏsa-yŏk

General information
- Location: Cheongnyong-dong, Geumjeong District, Busan; South Korea
- Coordinates: 35°16′24″N 129°05′34″E
- Operator: Busan Transportation Corporation
- Line: Line 1
- Platforms: 2
- Tracks: 2

Construction
- Structure type: Underground

Other information
- Station code: 133

History
- Opened: July 19, 1985

Services
Preceding station	Busan Metro	Following station
Namsan towards Dadaepo Beach	Line 1	Nopo Terminus
Location

Beomeosa Station (Korean: 범어사역; Hanja: 梵魚寺驛) is a station of the Busan Metro Line 1 in Cheongnyong-dong, Geumjeong District, Busan, South Korea. It is the nearest metro station to the Beomeosa temple.

== Station Layout ==
G	Street level	Exit

L1; Concourse	Lobby	Customer Service, Shops, Vending machines, ATMs

L2; Platforms	Side platform, doors will open on the right
L2; Platforms	Southbound	← Line 1 toward Dadaepo Beach (Namsan)
L2; Platforms	Northbound	Line 1 toward Nopo (Terminus) →
L2; Platforms	Side platform, doors will open on the right

== Gallery ==
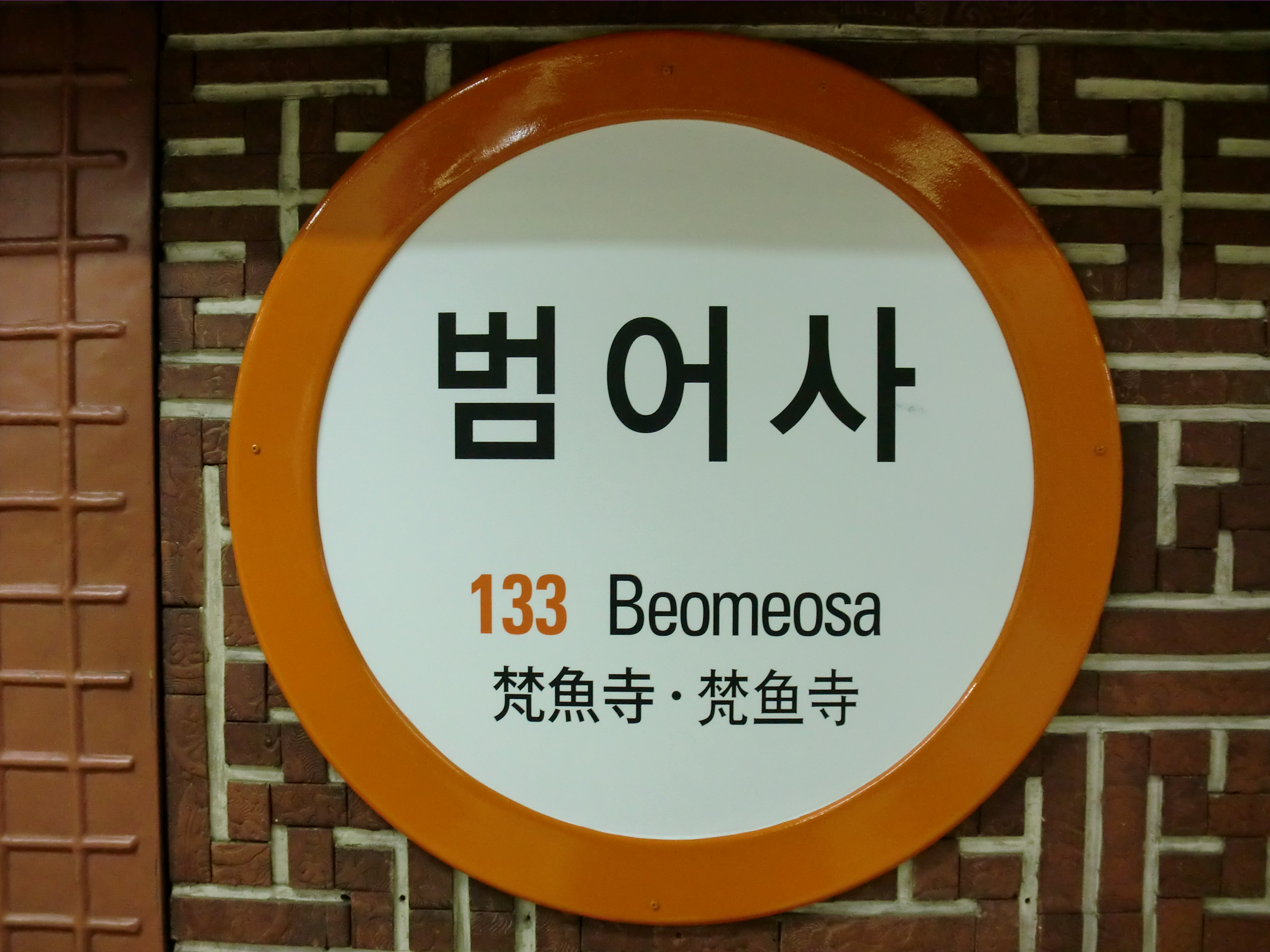
Station Sign

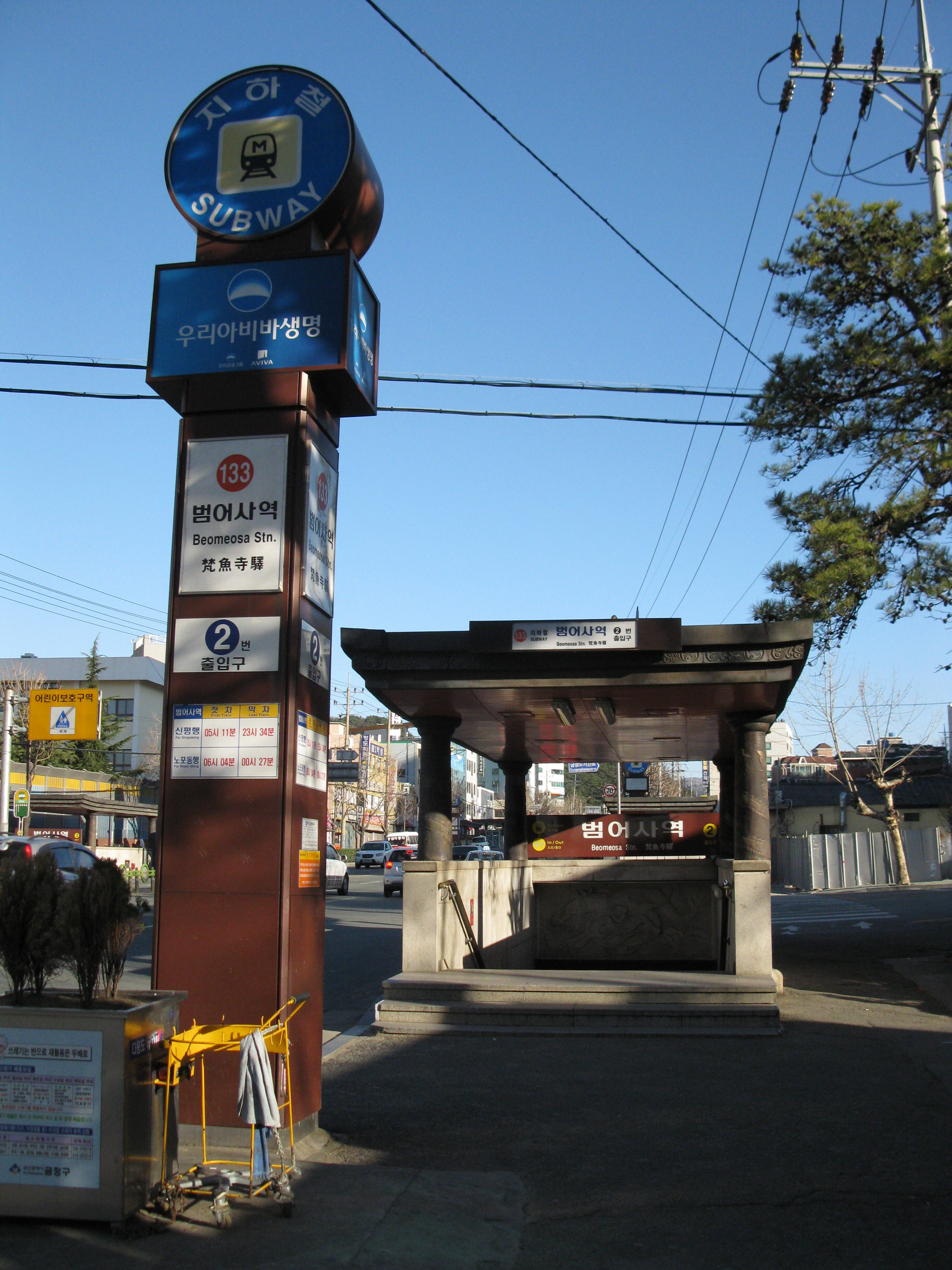
Station No. 2 Entrance
