= Jeonju Abu Bakr Al‑Seddiq Mosque =

Mosque in Jeonju, South Korea

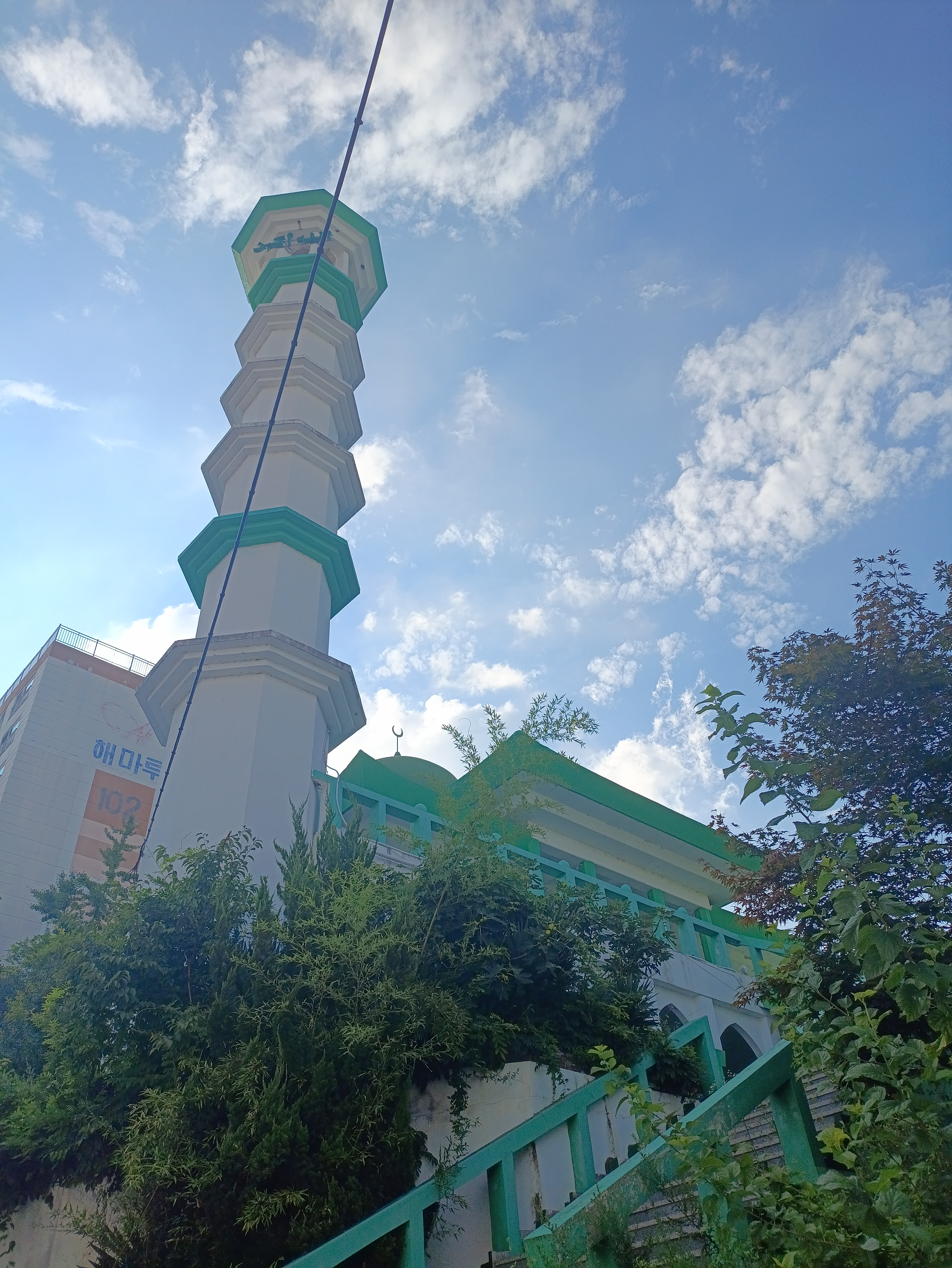
- Jeonju Masjid, blending traditional Korean and Islamic architectural elements

- Location in South Korea

Religion
- Affiliation: Islam
- Branch/tradition: Sunni Islam
- Region: Honam
- Ecclesiastical or organisational status: Active
- Leadership: Dr. Abdul Wahab Zahid
- Status: Active

Location
- Location: Inhu-dong, Deokjin, Jeonju, Jeolla
- Country: South Korea
- Coordinates: 35°50′56.9″N 127°09′01.4″E

Architecture
- Type: Mosque
- Style: Hybrid (Hanok-Islamic)
- Established: 1985

Specifications
- Capacity: 400 worshippers
- Dome: 1
- Minaret: 1
- Site area: 330.6 m²

Jeonju Abu Bakr Al‑Seddiq Mosque (Korean: 전주성원), often called as Jeonju Mosque, located in Deokjin-gu, Jeonju, Jeolla, South Korea and serves as an important center for Islamic worship and cultural exchange for both foreign residents and Korean converts.

== History ==
It was built in 1985 and open in 1986. By Imam Hak Apdu. and Elder Abdul Latif Sharif led a fundraising.

The Ambassador of Saudi Arabia visited jeonju mosque in March 2019.

== Architecture ==
The mosque is noted for its unique architectural style that blends Islamic design with traditional Korean aesthetics. Its roof eaves and overall form evoke elements of Hanok (traditional Korean houses), symbolizing the integration of Islamic faith within the local cultural context. This fusion reflects both the religious identity of its worshippers and the broader cultural landscape of Jeonju.

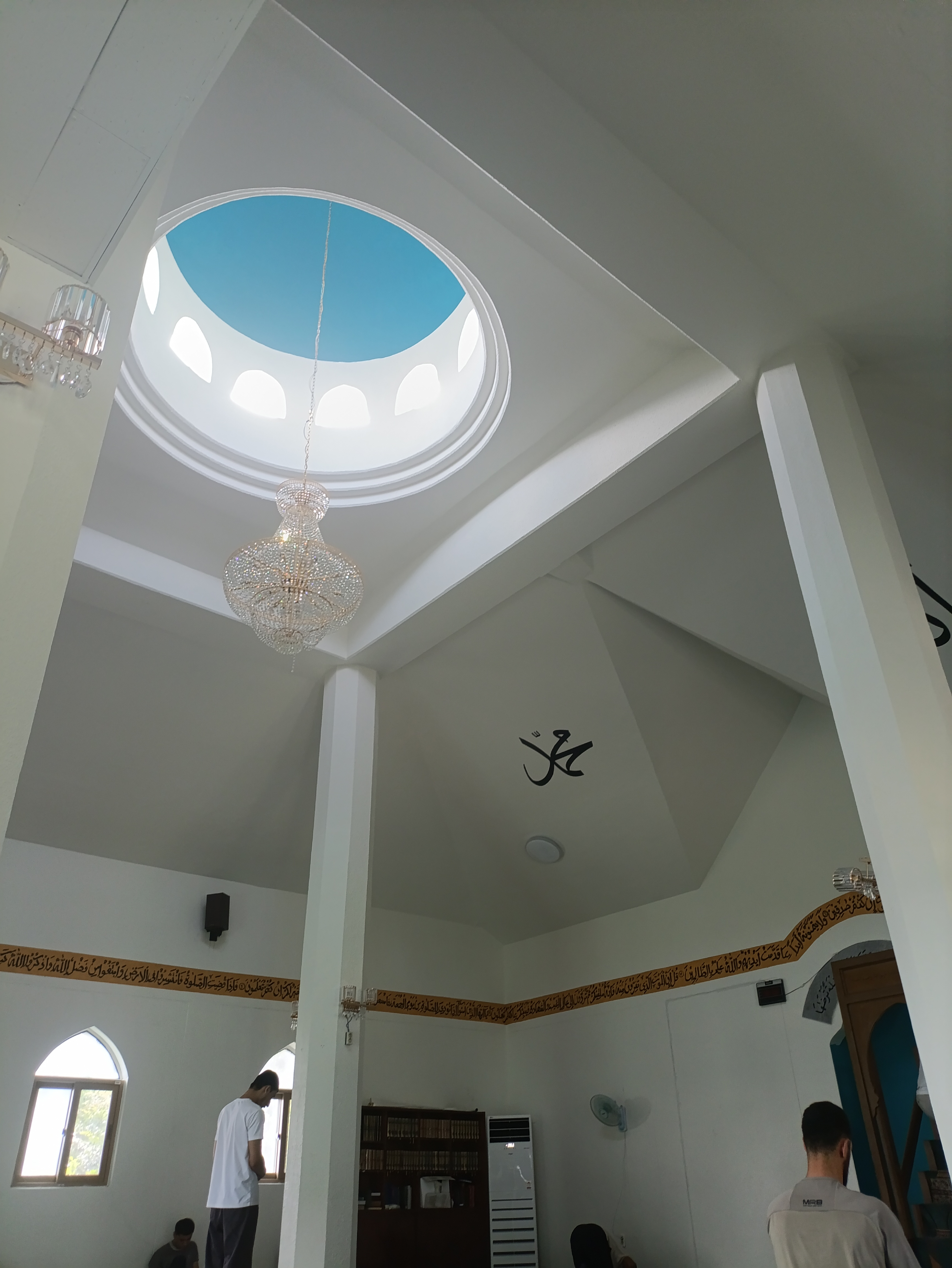
Jeonju City Mosque

== Facilities and activities ==
Jeonju Masjid provides facilities for the performance of all daily prayers, including provisions for wudu (ablution) and spaces for men and women in separate prayer areas. The site, covering approximately 330.6 m^{2}, is equipped with essential religious items such as prayer mats and Qurans. Services at the mosque are offered in English, Korean, and Arabic. In addition to regular prayer services—including the Friday Jumu’ah—Jeonju Masjid also hosts lectures, cultural events, and community gatherings aimed at fostering greater understanding of Islamic traditions in Korea.

== Events ==
- Eid al-Fitr and Eid al-Adha celebrations
- Ramadan Iftar gatherings
- Islamic cultural festivals and lectures
- Seminars and conferences on Islamic culture and social issues

== Notable Imams ==
- Dr. Abdul Wahab Zahid– Former Imam, known for promoting Islamic education and interfaith dialogue.

== Gallery ==
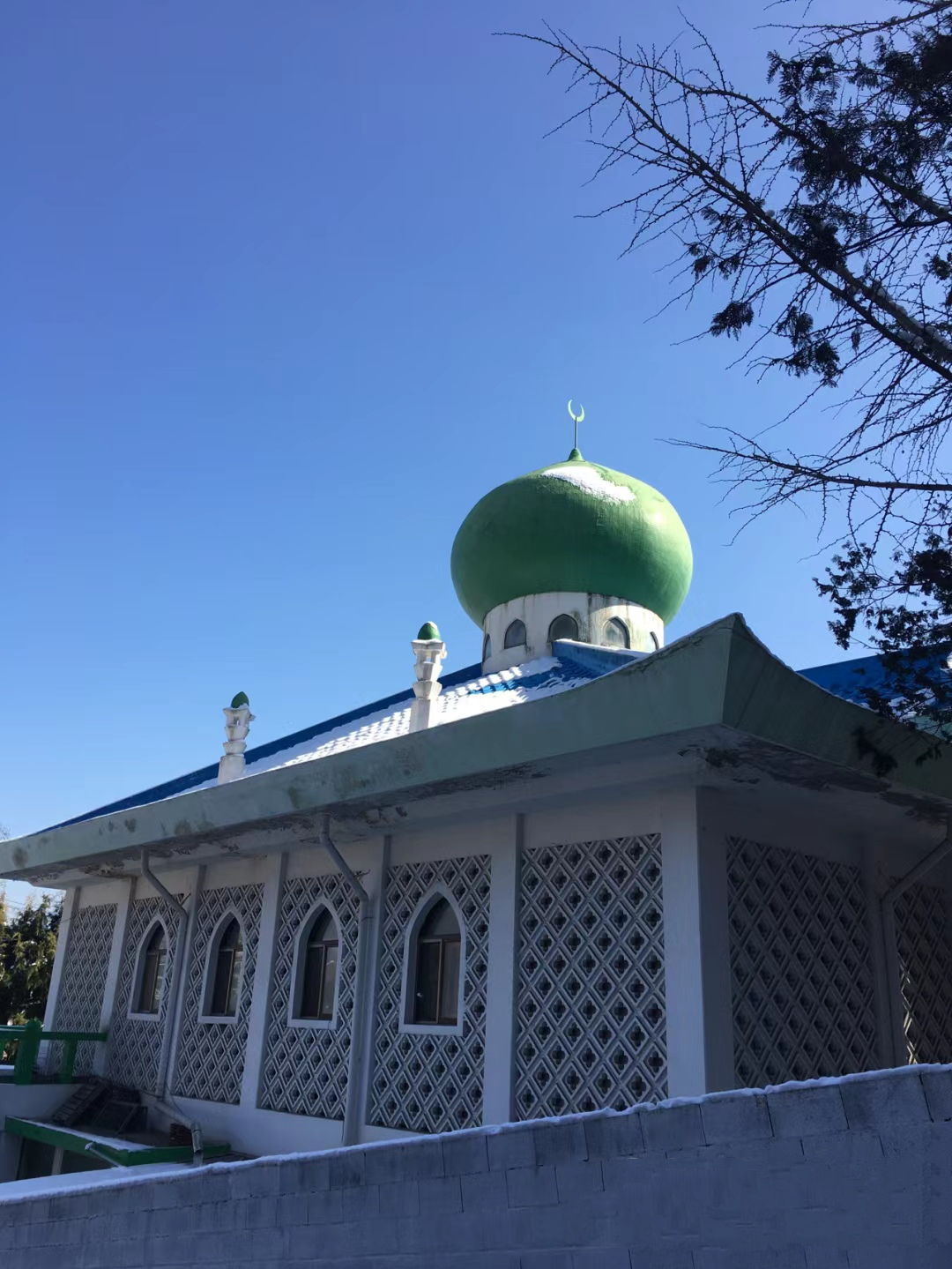
View from backside

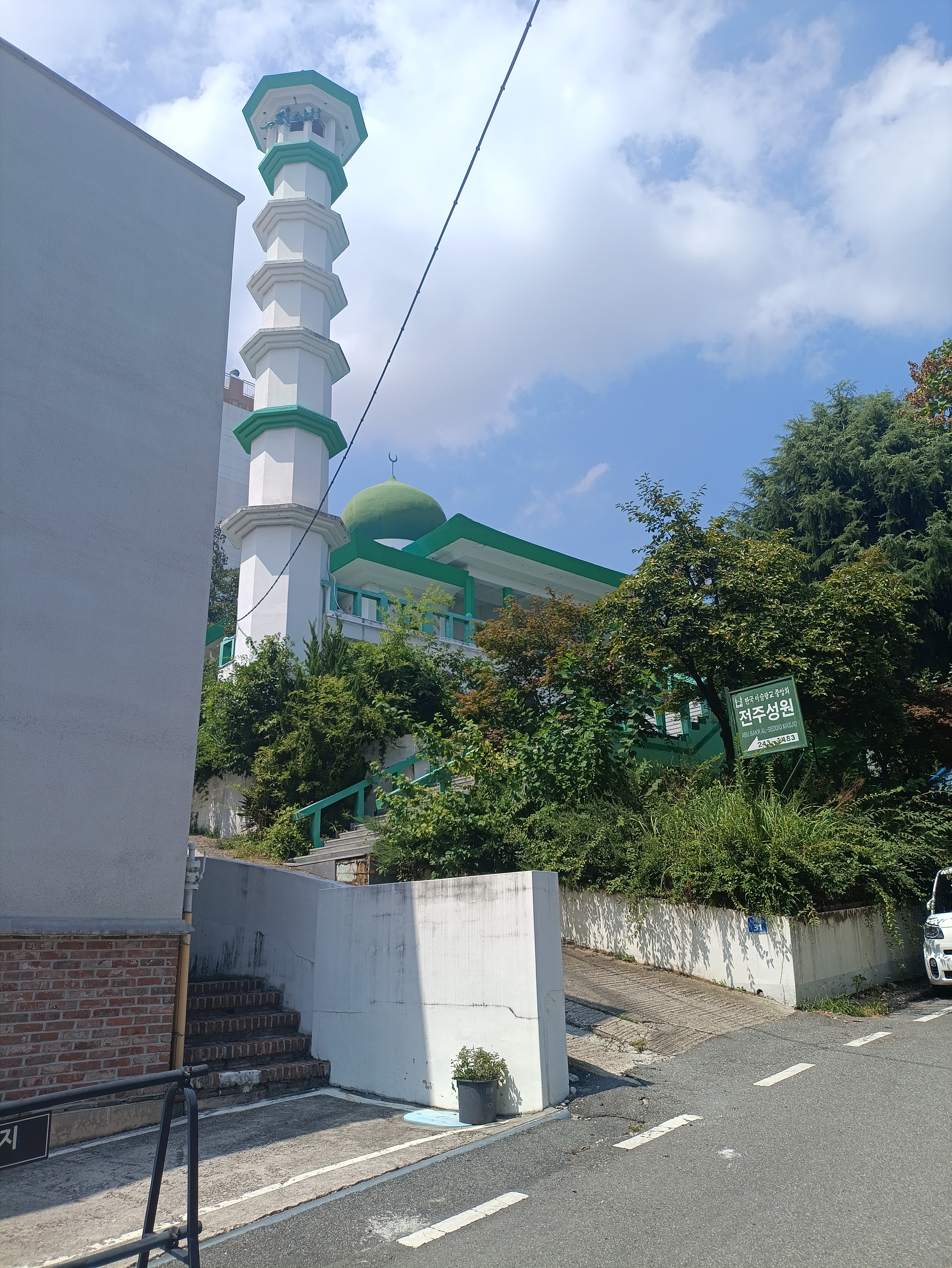
Approach with dome and minaret

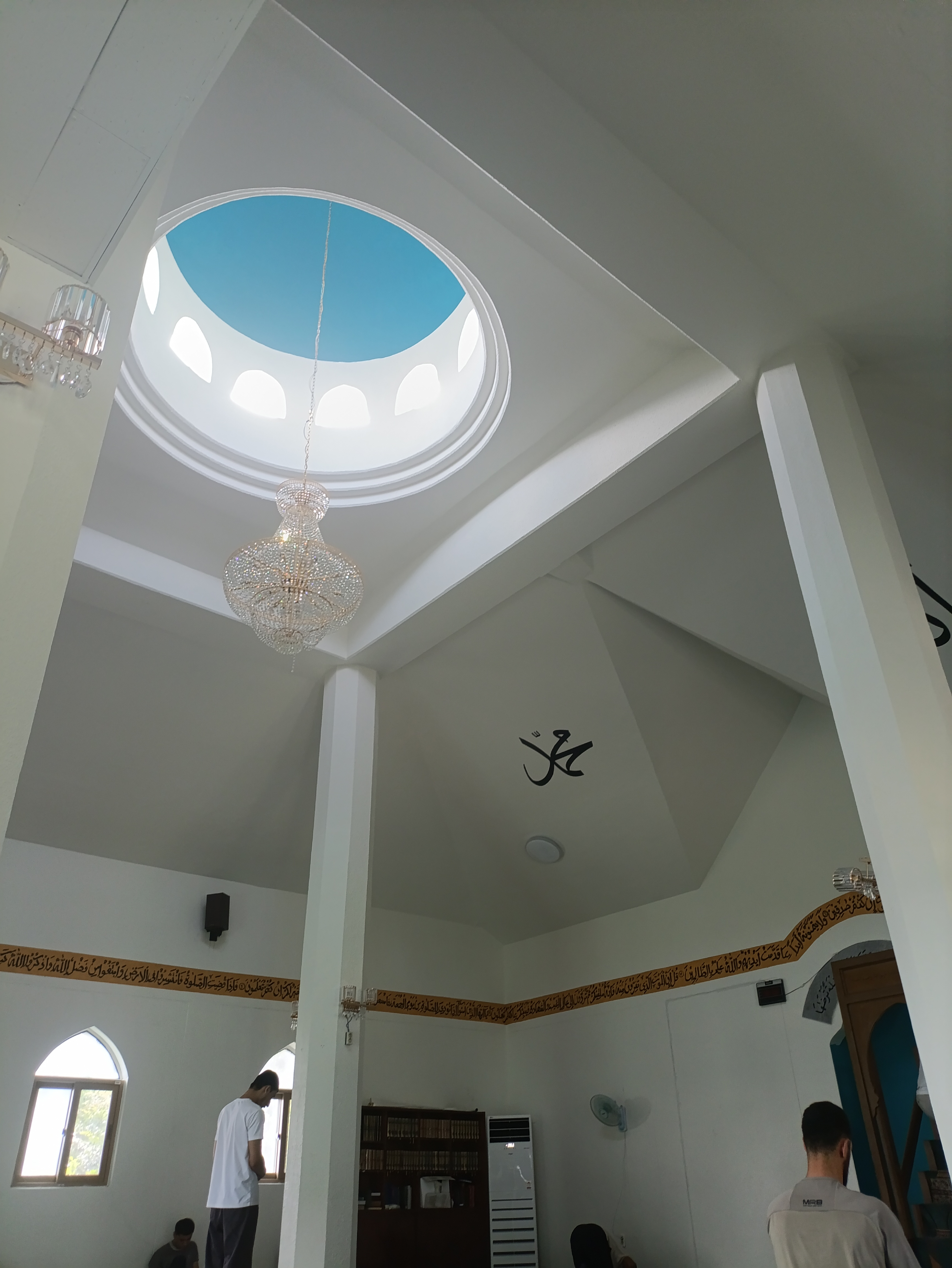
Inner View

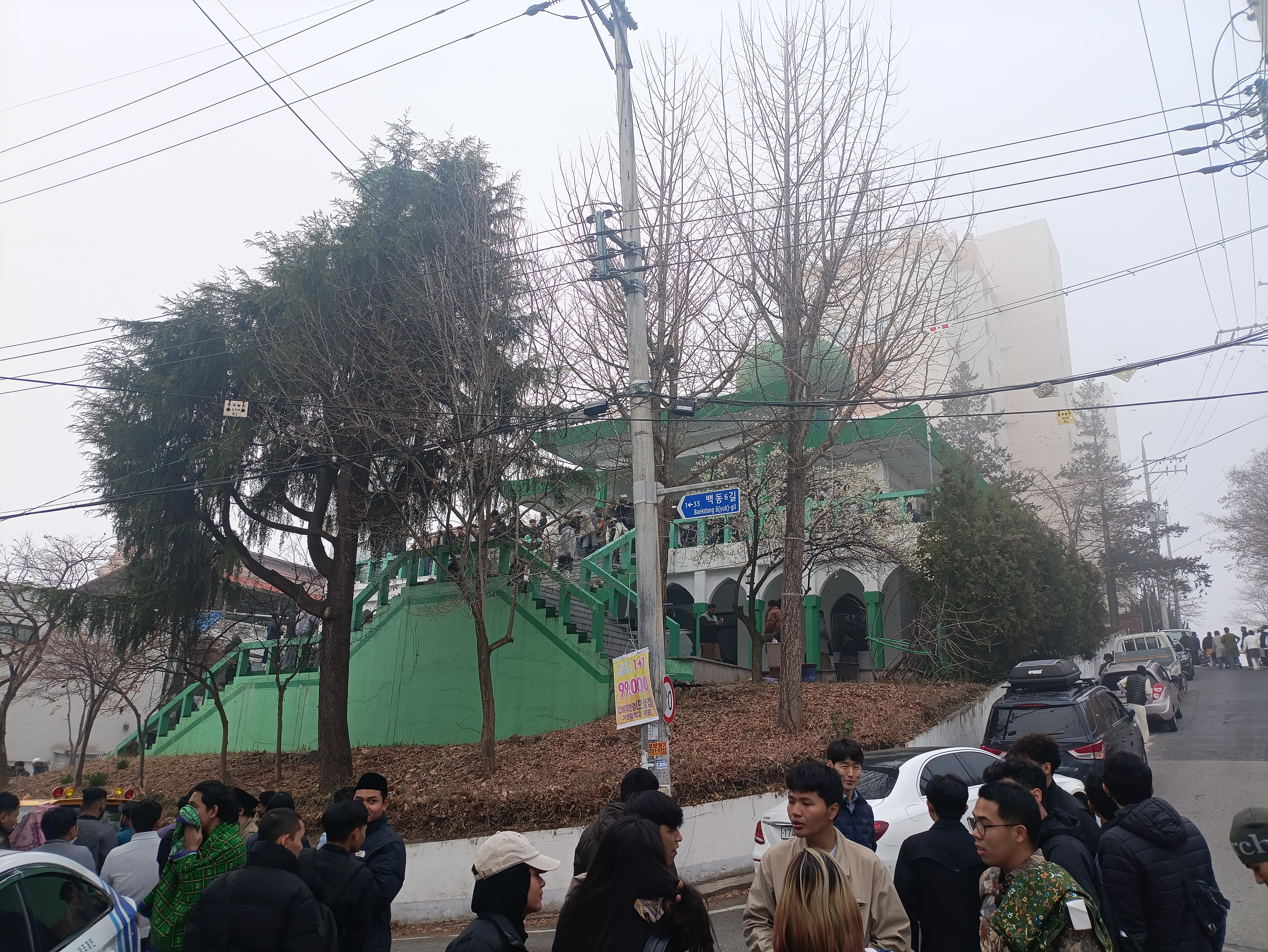
Jeonju Mosque during Eid al-Fitr 2026

== See also ==
- Islam in South Korea
- List of Mosques in South Korea
- Seoul Central Mosque
- Dar-ul-Emaan Kyungpook Islamic Center
- Korean Muslim Federation
