= Pusan National University station =

Station of the Busan Metro

128 부산대 Pusan Nat'l Univ.
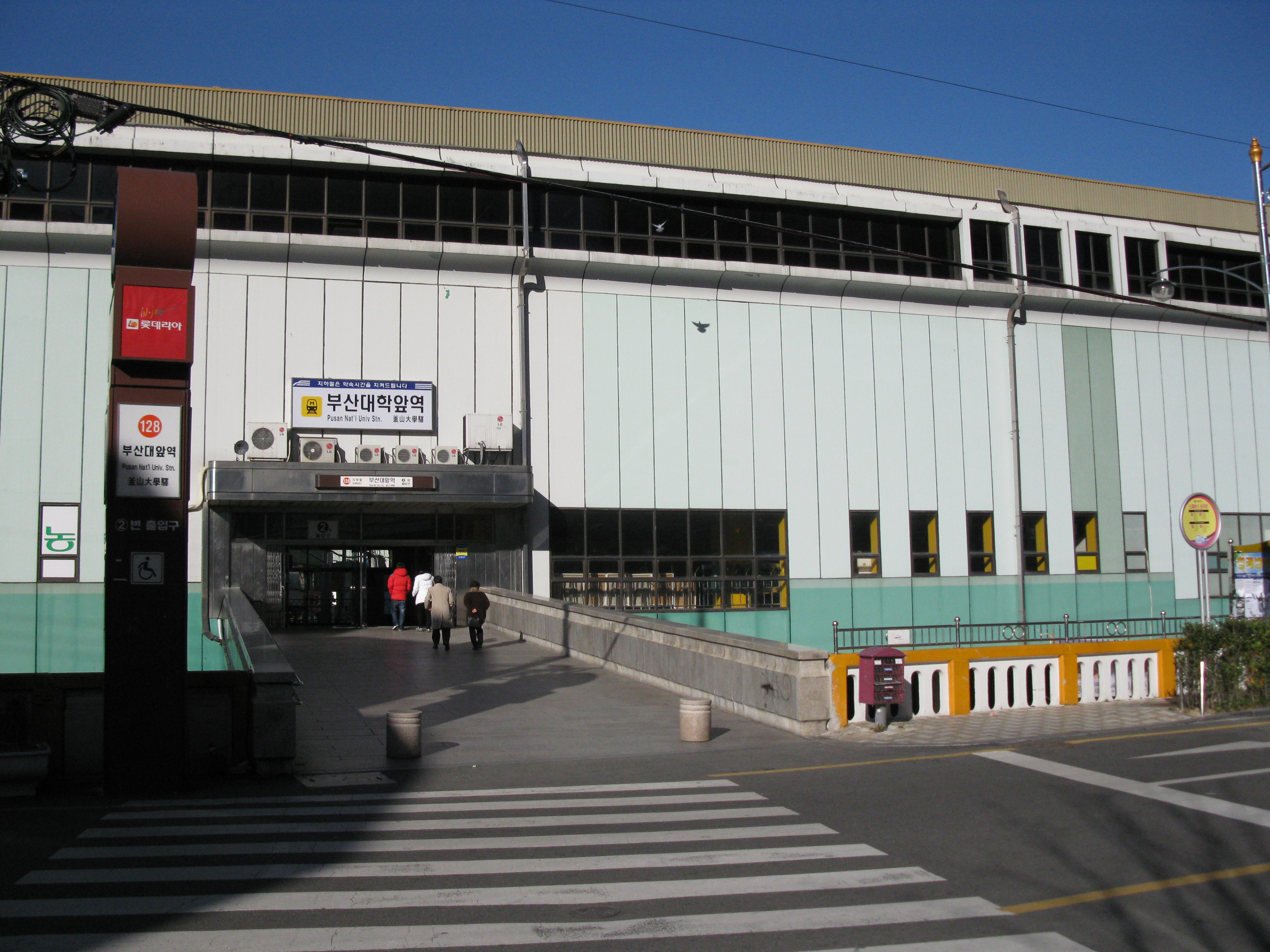

Korean name
- Hangul: 부산대역
- Hanja: 釜山大驛
- Revised Romanization: Busandae-yeok
- McCune–Reischauer: Pusandae-yŏk

General information
- Location: Jangjeon-dong, Geumjeong District, Busan; South Korea
- Coordinates: 35°13′48″N 129°05′22″E
- Operator: Busan Transportation Corporation
- Line: Line 1
- Platforms: 2
- Tracks: 2

Construction
- Structure type: Aboveground

Other information
- Station code: 128

History
- Opened: July 19, 1985

Services
Preceding station	Busan Metro	Following station
Oncheonjang towards Dadaepo Beach	Line 1	Jangjeon towards Nopo
Location

Pusan National University Station (Korean: 부산대역; Hanja: 釜山大驛) is a station of Busan Metro Line 1 in Jangjeon-dong, Geumjeong District, Busan, South Korea.

== Station layout ==
G	Street level	Exit

L1; Concourse	Lobby	Customer Service, Shops, Vending machines, ATMs

L2; Platforms	Side platform, doors will open on the right
L2; Platforms	Southbound	← Line 1 toward Dadaepo Beach (Oncheonjang)
L2; Platforms	Northbound	Line 1 toward Nopo (Jangjeon)→
L2; Platforms	Side platform, doors will open on the right
