= Oncheonjang station =

Station of the Busan Metro

127 온천장 (우리들병원) Oncheonjang (Wooridul Hospital)
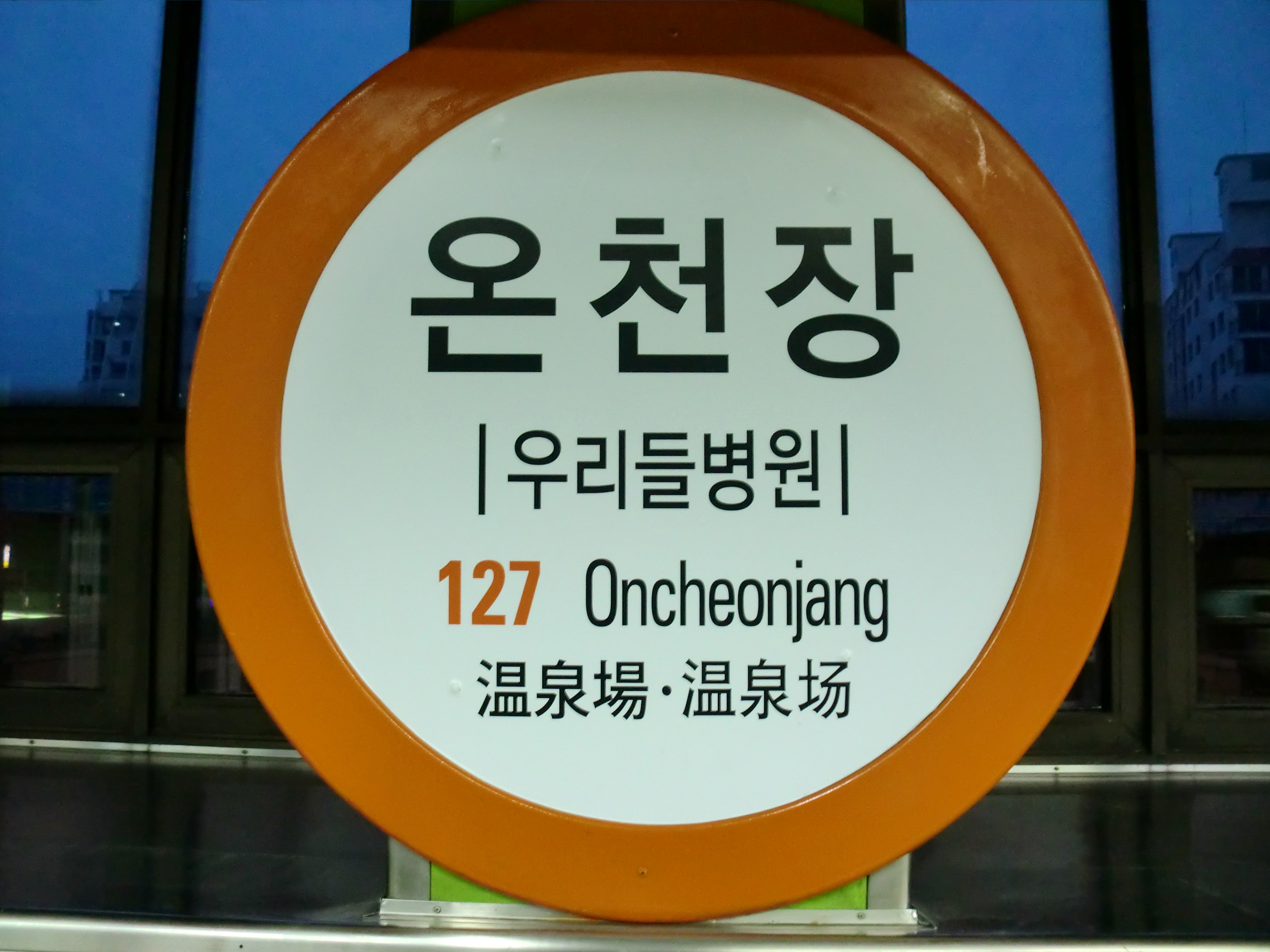

Korean name
- Hangul: 온천장역
- Hanja: 溫泉場驛
- Revised Romanization: Oncheonjang yeok
- McCune–Reischauer: Onch'ŏnchang yŏk

General information
- Location: Oncheon-dong, Dongnae District, Busan; South Korea
- Coordinates: 35°13′14″N 129°05′12″E
- Operator: Busan Transportation Corporation
- Line: Line 1
- Platforms: 2
- Tracks: 2

Construction
- Structure type: Aboveground

Other information
- Station code: 127

History
- Opened: July 19, 1985

Services
Preceding station	Busan Metro	Following station
Myeongnyun towards Dadaepo Beach	Line 1	Pusan National University towards Nopo
Location

Oncheonjang Station (Korean: 온천장역; Hanja: 溫泉場驛) is a station of Busan Metro Line 1 in Oncheon-dong, Dongnae District, Busan, South Korea.

== Station layout ==
G	Street level	Exit

L1; Concourse	Lobby	Customer Service, Shops, Vending machines, ATMs

L2; Platforms	Side platform, doors will open on the right
L2; Platforms	Southbound	← Line 1 toward Dadaepo Beach (Myeongnyun)
L2; Platforms	Northbound	Line 1 toward Nopo (Pusan National University)→
L2; Platforms	Side platform, doors will open on the right
