= Dusil station =

Station of the Busan Metro

131 두실 Dusil
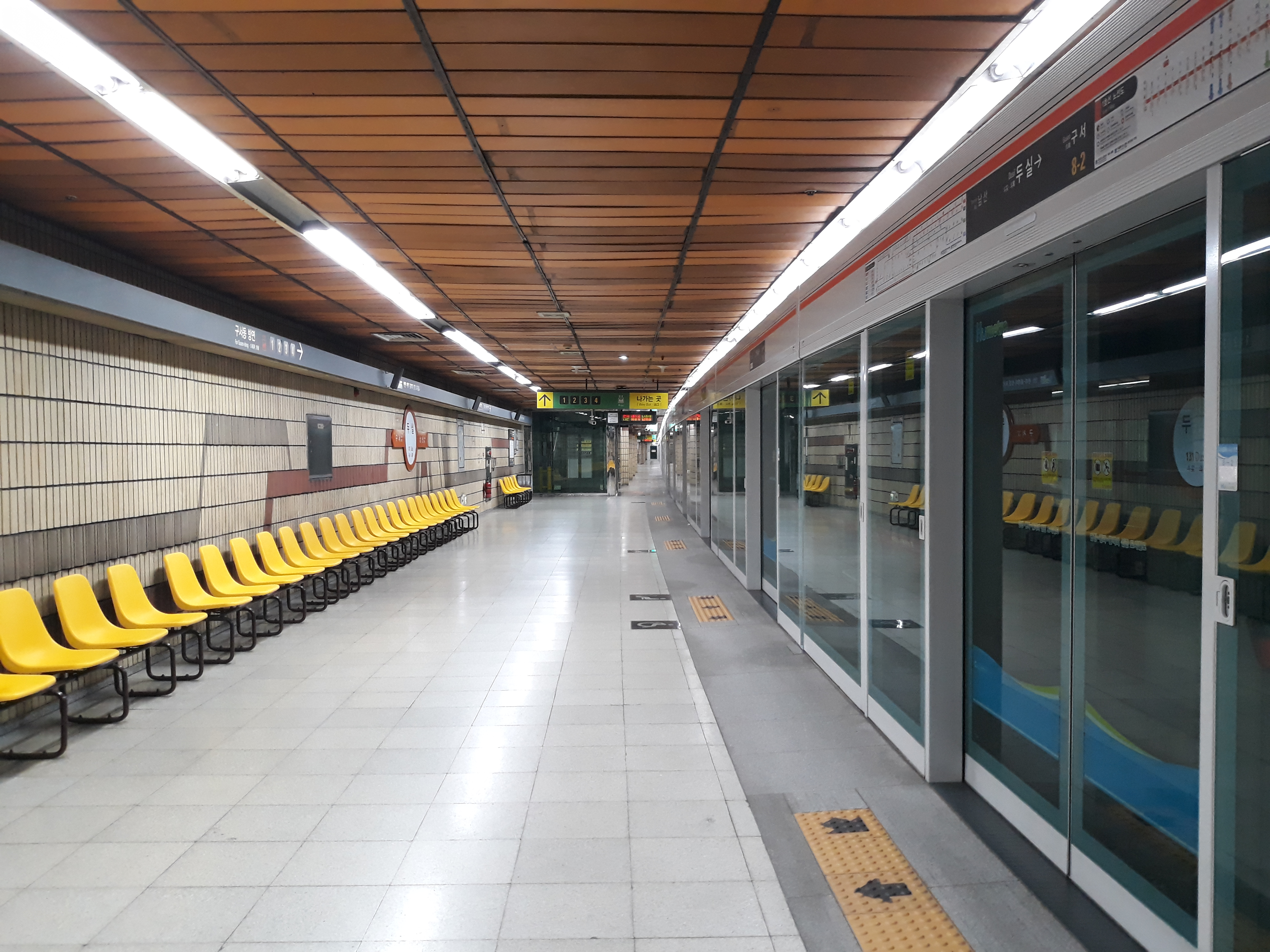

Korean name
- Hangul: 두실역
- Hanja: 斗實驛
- Revised Romanization: Dusil-yeok
- McCune–Reischauer: Tusil-yŏk

General information
- Location: Guseo-dong, Geumjeong District, Busan; South Korea
- Coordinates: 35°15′25″N 129°05′29″E
- Operator: Busan Transportation Corporation
- Line: Line 1
- Platforms: 2
- Tracks: 2

Construction
- Structure type: Underground

Other information
- Station code: 131

History
- Opened: July 19, 1985

Services
Preceding station	Busan Metro	Following station
Guseo towards Dadaepo Beach	Line 1	Namsan towards Nopo
Location

Dusil Station (Korean: 두실역; Hanja: 斗實驛) is a station of the Busan Metro Line 1 in Guseo-dong, Geumjeong District, Busan, South Korea.

== Station Layout ==
G	Street level	Exit

L1; Concourse	Lobby	Customer Service, Shops, Vending machines, ATMs

L2; Platforms	Side platform, doors will open on the right
L2; Platforms	Southbound	← Line 1 toward Dadaepo Beach (Guseo)
L2; Platforms	Northbound	Line 1 toward Nopo (Namsan)→
L2; Platforms	Side platform, doors will open on the right

== Around the station ==
- Busan Al-Fatah Mosque
