= Namsan station (Busan Metro) =

Station of the Busan Metro

132 남산 Namsan
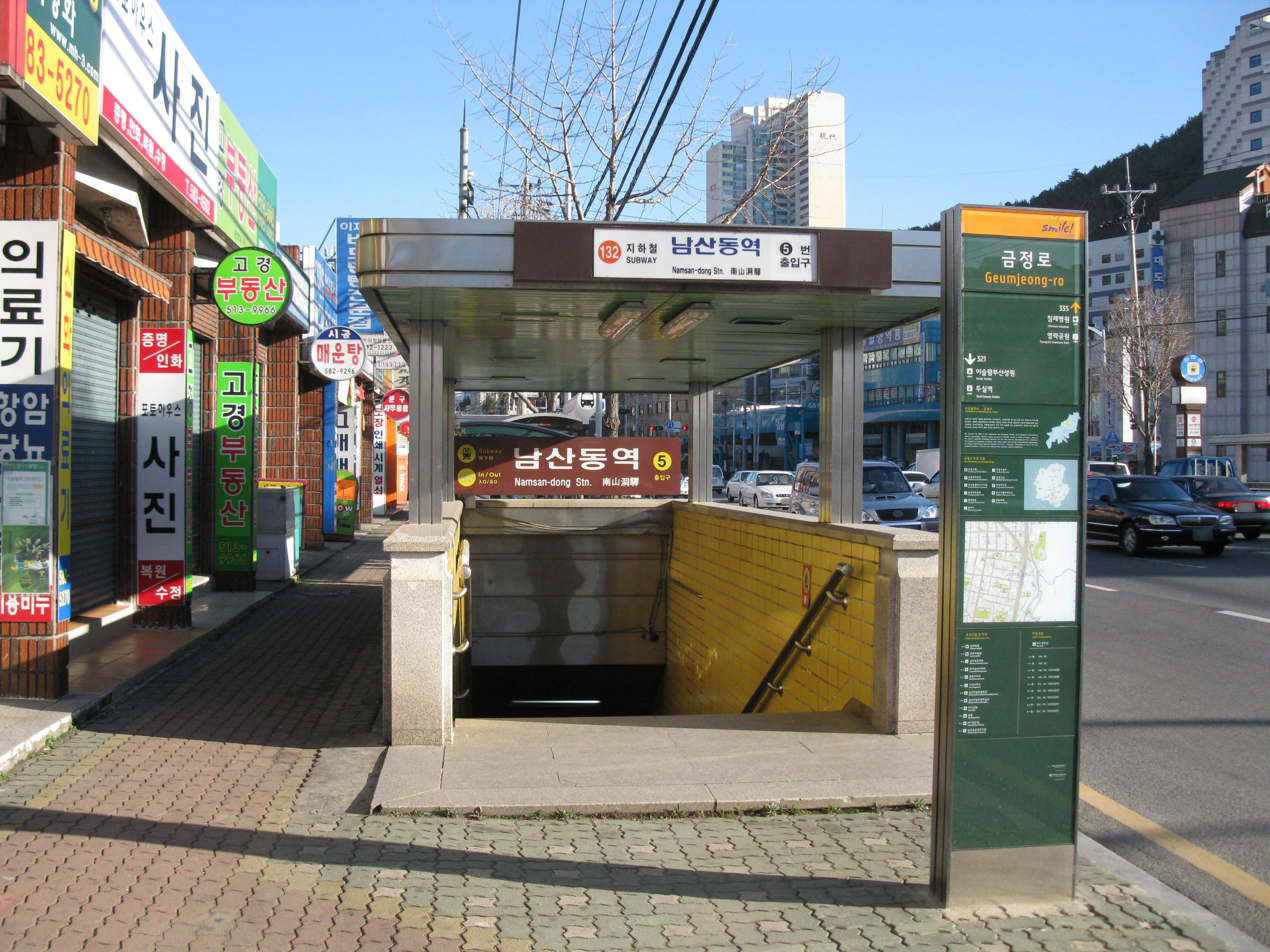
- Station Entrance No. 5

Korean name
- Hangul: 남산역
- Hanja: 南山驛
- Revised Romanization: Namsan yeok
- McCune–Reischauer: Namsan yŏk

General information
- Location: Namsan-dong, Geumjeong District, Busan; South Korea
- Coordinates: 35°15′55″N 129°05′33″E
- Operator: Busan Transportation Corporation
- Line: Line 1
- Platforms: 2
- Tracks: 2

Construction
- Structure type: Underground

Other information
- Station code: 132

History
- Opened: July 19, 1985
- Former names: Namsan-dong

Services
Preceding station	Busan Metro	Following station
Dusil towards Dadaepo Beach	Line 1	Beomeosa towards Nopo
Location

Namsan Station (Korean: 남산역; Hanja: 南山驛) is a station of Busan Metro Line 1 in Namsan-dong, Geumjeong District, Busan, South Korea.

== Station Layout ==
G	Street level	Exit

L1; Concourse	Lobby	Customer Service, Shops, Vending machines, ATMs

L2; Platforms	Side platform, doors will open on the right
L2; Platforms	Southbound	← Line 1 toward Dadaepo Beach (Dusil)
L2; Platforms	Northbound	Line 1 toward Nopo (Beomeosa)→
L2; Platforms	Side platform, doors will open on the right

== Gallery ==
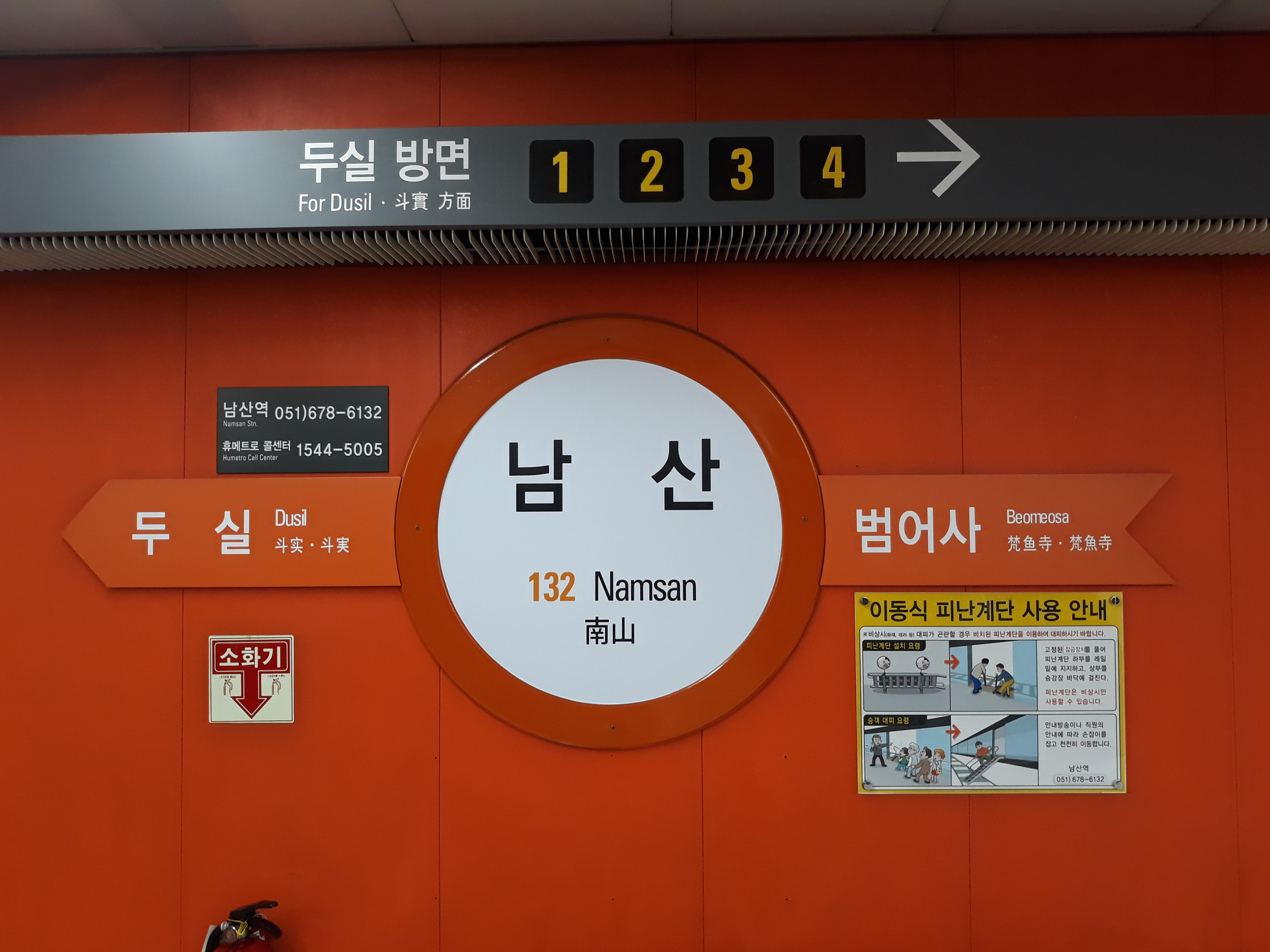
Station Sign

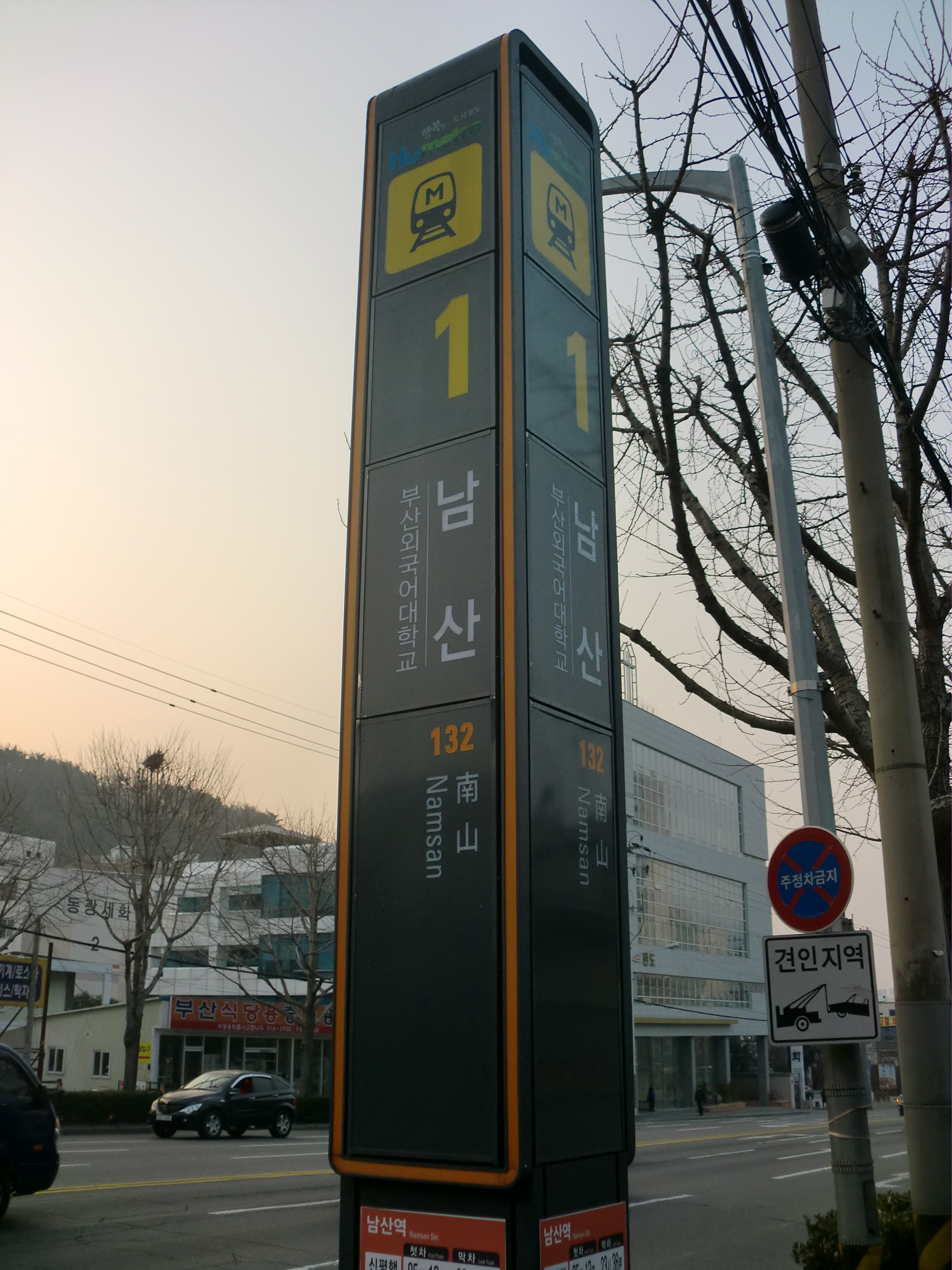
Station Exit No. 1

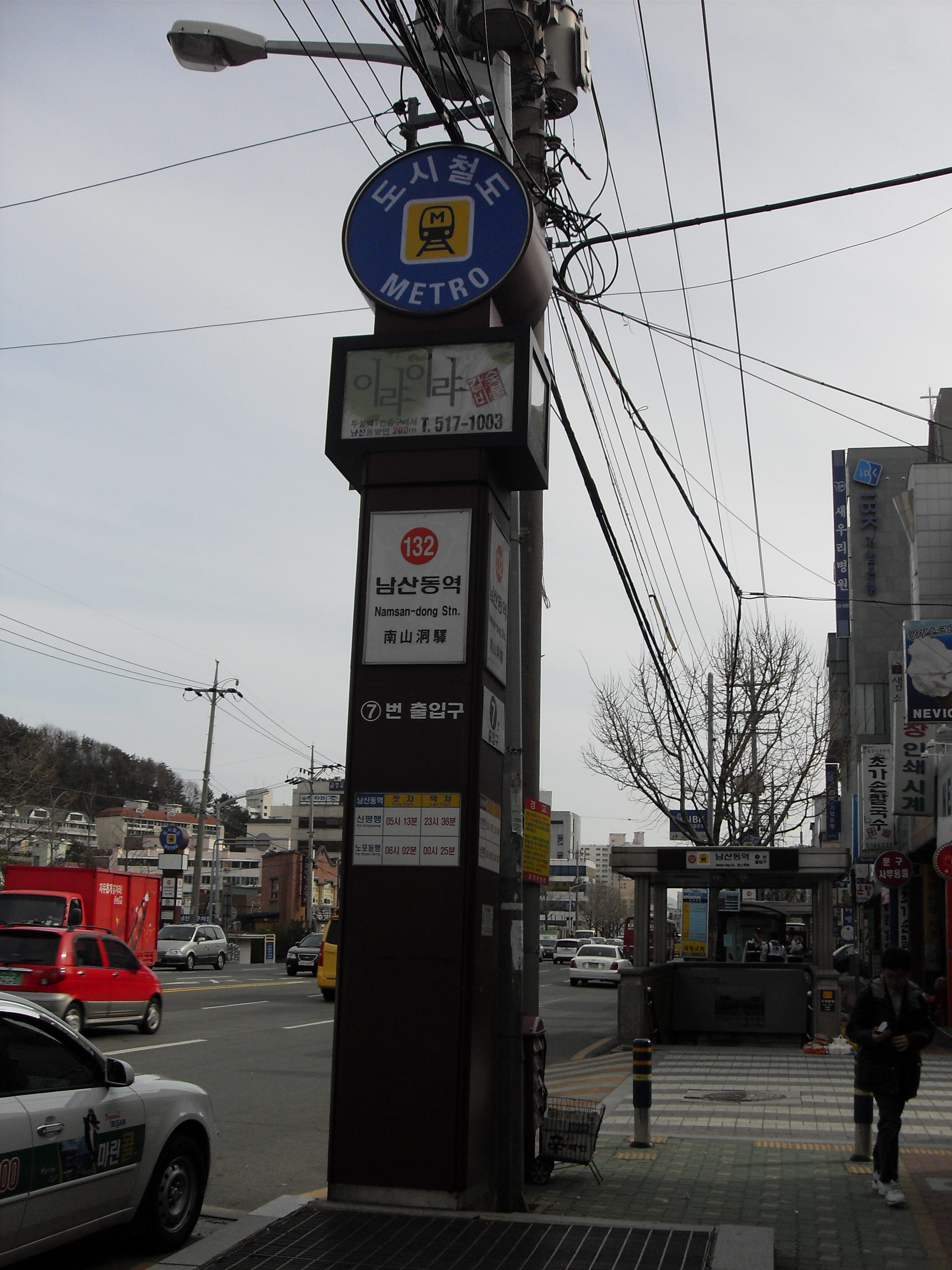
Station Sign Entrance
