= Jangjeon station =

Station of the Busan Metro

129 장전 Jangjeon
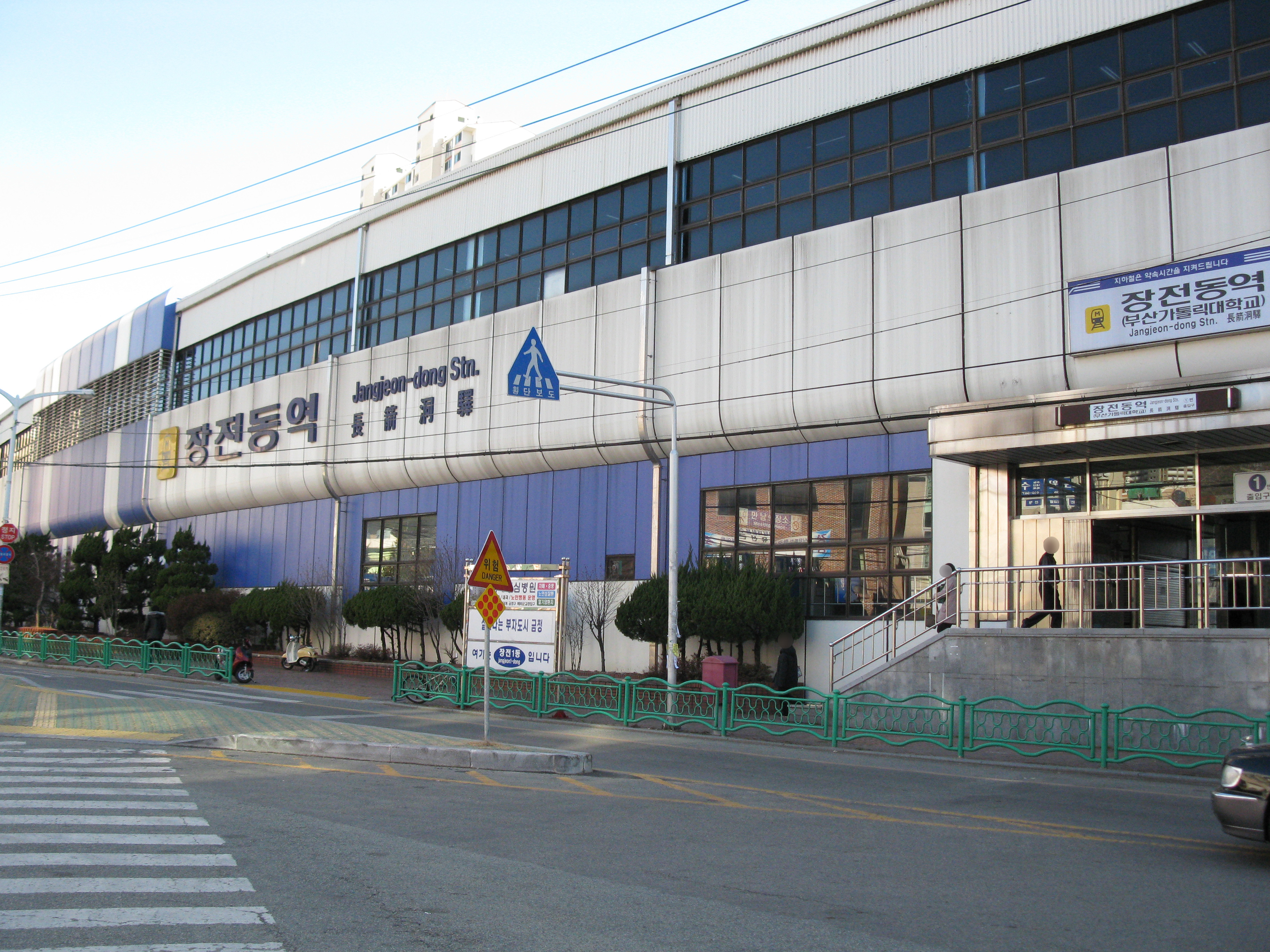

Korean name
- Hangul: 장전역
- Hanja: 長箭驛
- Revised Romanization: Jangjeon yeok
- McCune–Reischauer: Changjŏn yŏk

General information
- Location: Jangjeon-dong, Geumjeong District, Busan; South Korea
- Coordinates: 35°14′17″N 129°05′17″E
- Operator: Busan Transportation Corporation
- Line: Line 1
- Platforms: 2
- Tracks: 2

Construction
- Structure type: Aboveground

Other information
- Station code: 129

History
- Opened: July 19, 1985
- Former names: Jangjeon-dong

Services
Preceding station	Busan Metro	Following station
Pusan National University towards Dadaepo Beach	Line 1	Guseo towards Nopo
Location

Jangjeon Station (Korean: 장전역) is a station of Busan Metro Line 1 in Jangjeon-dong, Geumjeong District, Busan, South Korea.

== Station Layout ==
G	Street level	Exit

L1; Concourse	Lobby	Customer Service, Shops, Vending machines, ATMs

L2; Platforms	Side platform, doors will open on the right
L2; Platforms	Southbound	← Line 1 toward Dadaepo Beach (Pusan National University)
L2; Platforms	Northbound	Line 1 toward Nopo (Guseo)→
L2; Platforms	Side platform, doors will open on the right
