= Dadaepo Harbor station =

Station of the Busan Metro

Coordinates: 35.0568°N 128.9709°E

096 다대포항 Dadaepo Harbor
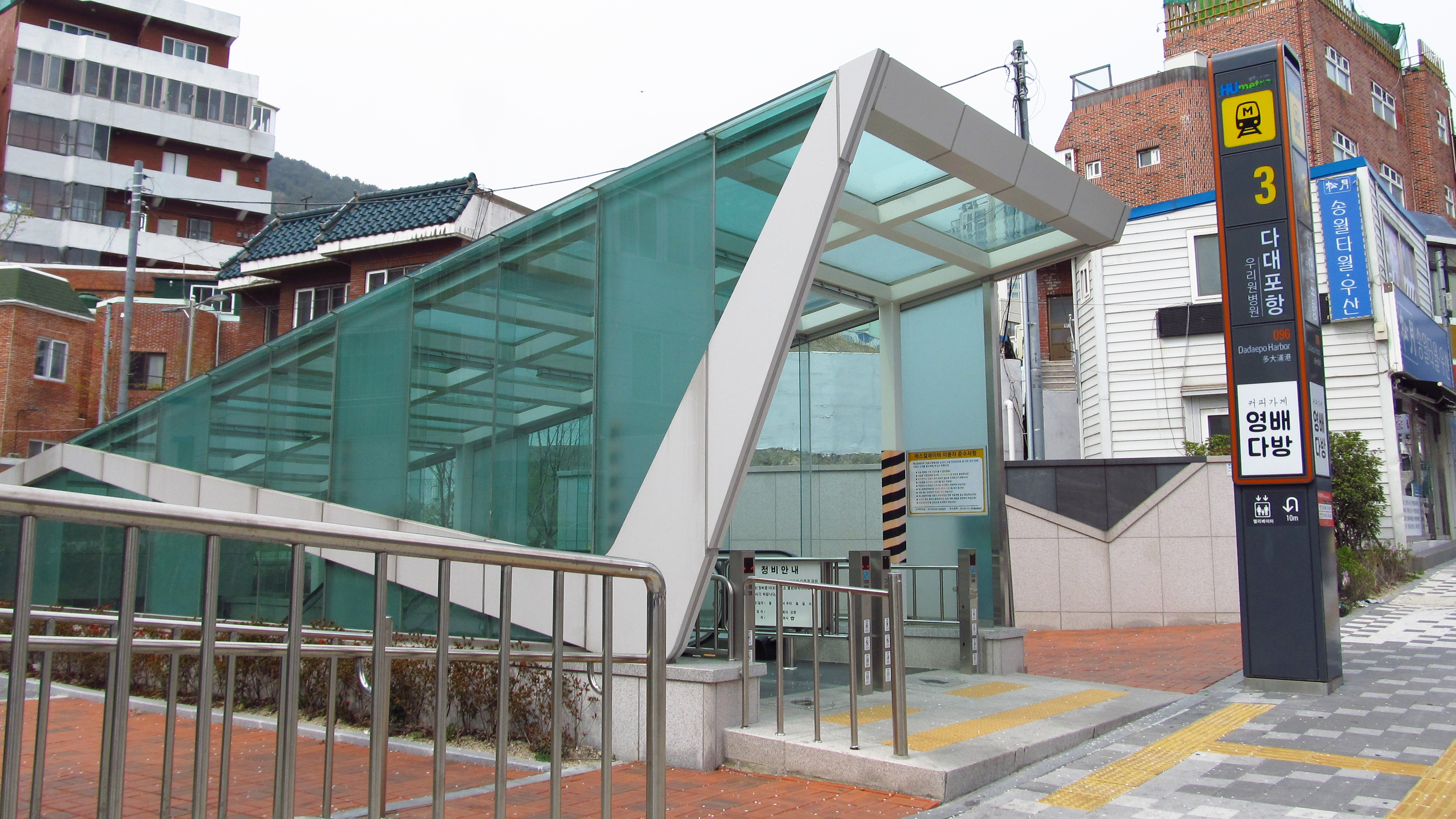
- Dadaepo Harbor Station Exit No. 3

Korean name
- Hangul: 다대포항역
- Hanja: 多大浦港驛
- Revised Romanization: Dadaepohang-yeok
- McCune–Reischauer: Tadaep'ohang-yŏk

General information
- Location: Dadae-dong, Saha District, Busan; South Korea
- Operator: Busan Transportation Corporation
- Line: Line 1
- Platforms: 2
- Tracks: 2

Construction
- Structure type: Underground

Other information
- Station code: 096

History
- Opened: April 20, 2017; 9 years ago

Services
Preceding station	Busan Metro	Following station
Dadaepo Beach Terminus	Line 1	Natgae towards Nopo
Location

Dadaepo Harbor Station (Korean: 다대포항역; Hanja: 多大浦港驛) is a station of the Busan Metro Line 1 in Dadae-dong, Saha District, Busan, South Korea.

== Station Layout ==
G	Street level	Exit

L1; Concourse	Lobby	Customer Service, Shops, Vending machines, ATMs

L2; Platforms	Side platform, doors will open on the right
L2; Platforms	Southbound	← Line 1 toward Dadaepo Beach (Terminus)
L2; Platforms	Northbound	Line 1 toward Nopo (Natgae)→
L2; Platforms	Side platform, doors will open on the right
