= Islamic Center of Daejeon =

Islamic center in Yuseong-gu, Daejeon, South Korea

Islamic Center of Daejeon 대전 이슬라믹 센터

Religion
- Affiliation: Sunni Islam

Location
- Location: 193 Daehak-Ro Yuseong-gu, Daejeon, South Korea
- Country: South Korea
- Interactive map of Islamic Center of Daejeon 대전 이슬라믹 센터

Architecture
- Type: Mosque
- Completed: 2006; 20 years ago

Islamic Center of Daejeon (ICD; Korean: 대전 이슬람 센터) was established in December 2006 and located in Yuseong-gu, Daejeon, South Korea. It lies in the midst of a triangle containing Korea Advanced Institute of Science and Technology (KAIST), Information and Communication University and Chungnam National University. The closest Daejeon metro station is Wolpyeong (KAIST).

== Background ==
- Dec. 2006, with the help of Korean Muslim Federation (KMF) and donations of the Muslims in the city, the ICD was established inside a rented floor in Kung-Dong, Yuseong-gu.
- 29 Dec. 2006, The first Eid prayer of Eid-ul-fitr was offered.
- Jan. 2007, First Adhoc Volunteer Council was formed, and Presidential Elections were held.
- Jan. 2007, The Constitution of ICD was promulgated.
- Jan. 2007, Saturday Islamic Study Circle was established.
- Jun. 2007, Official inauguration by KMF and ambassadors of Muslim countries.
- Jan. 2008, Availability of Halal meat in ICD.
- Jun. 2008, Availability of all types of Halal food in ICD.
- Jul. 2009, 1st Constitutional Amendment was promulgated.
- Aug. 2009, Second Adhoc Volunteer Council was formed, and Presidential Elections were held.
- 27 Sep. 2009, The Branch of ICD was established inside a rented floor in downtown of Daejeon by Indonesian Muslim Community (IMNIDA)
- Dec. 2009, 2nd, 3rd & 4th Constitutional Amendments were promulgated.
- Aug. 2010, Islamic School for Muslim Children was established.
- Dec. 2010, Third Adhoc Volunteer Council was formed, and Presidential Elections were held.
- Dec. 2010, 5th, 6th & 7th Amendments to ICD Constitution were promulgated.
- May. 2011, With the help of Al-Huda Islamic Society (Registered), the contract for Permanent Masjid building was signed.
- Oct. 2011, The full payment was made for the Islamic Center Building.
- Dec. 2011, The Phase 1 renovations including full renovation of basement, and temporary renovation of second and third floor was done.
- Dec. 2011, On the completion of phase 1 renovations, on 12 December, the Islamic Center moved to the permanent building

== Activities ==
The management of ICD is divided into sub-committees. Some tasks carried out by these are:

- President (Ameer of the Islamic Center)
- Secretary General (Managerial Superintendent of the Islamic Center)
- Event Services and Management Team (Responsible for organizing and manage all the events held at Islamic Center)
- Finance Committee (Running the rented mosque, Gathering donations for permanent mosque etc.)
- Dawa Committee (Daily Prayers, Juma Prayers, Ramadan Tarawih Prayers, Etikaf (إعتكاف), Weekend Dars, Library, Monthly Night, Yearly Convention, Welcome/Farewell Parties, Ramadan Iftars, Arabic Lessons, Weekend Football)
- Service Committee (Management and Maintenance of the Masjid & Entertainment at Events)
- Halal Food Service (Provision of Halal Food to the Muslim Community in Daejeon)

== Current ==
The ICD procured a venue for a permanent mosque in Daejeon. The Islamic Center of Daejeon (ICD/ Daejeon Mosque), is a relatively large Mosque of several floors, occupying a converted residential building. There is a full-time imam, Dr. Ehsanullah Mirza, with the five daily prayers being prayed in congregation, and other social needs being met, such as marriages being conducted, the provision of counselling, Islamic education, and assistance to understand Islam. The second floor also has a room dedicated for women.

== See also ==
- Islam in Korea
- List of mosques in South Korea
