= Busan Al-Fatah Mosque =

Mosque in Geumjeong, Busan, South Korea

- 한국 이슬람 부산성원

Religion
- Affiliation: Sunni Islam
- Ecclesiastical or organisational status: Mosque
- Status: Active

Location
- Location: No. 30-1, Namsan, Geumjeong, Busan
- Country: South Korea
- Interactive map of Busan Al-Fatah Mosque
- Coordinates: 35°15′36″N 129°5′32″E

Architecture
- Type: Mosque architecture
- Funded by: Government of Libya
- Completed: 1980

- Busan Al-Fatah Mosque
- Hangul: 한국 이슬람 부산성원
- Revised Romanization: Han-guk Iseullam Busan Seong-won McCune–Reischauer
- McCune–Reischauer: Han’guk Isŭllam Pusan Sŏng’wŏn

The Busan Al-Fatah Mosque (Korean: 한국 이슬람 부산성원) is a mosque in Namsan-dong, Geumjeong District, Busan, South Korea.

== Overview ==
In September 1979 ground breaking ceremony was held by the support of Ali Fellaq, the financial minister of Libya.

The mosque was completed in 1980 with donation from Libya.

The mosque is a white building structure with Middle East architectural style. It also features a library.

The mosque is accessible within walking distance north of Dusil Station of Busan Metro.

== See also ==
- Islam in South Korea
- List of mosques in South Korea
