= Dar-ul-Emaan Kyungpook Islamic Center =

Mosque in Daegu, South Korea

Religion
- Affiliation: Islam
- Branch/tradition: Sunni

Location
- Location: Daehyeon-dong, Dalseo District, Daegu, South Korea
- Interactive map of Dar-ul-Emaan Kyungpook Islamic Center
- Administration: Kyungpook Muslim Student Association
- Coordinates: 35.8874°N 128.6038°E

Architecture
- Type: Mosque
- Established: 2014 (informal); 2020 (official)
- Site area: 245.14 square metres (2,638.7 sq ft)

Dar-ul-Emaan Kyungpook Islamic Center, also known as Jamia Masjid Uthman bin Affan, is a mosque and Islamic community center located in Daehyeon-dong, Buk-gu, Daegu, South Korea. It primarily serves Muslim students, workers, and residents in the Daegu and Gyeongsan region.

== History ==
The center began informally in 2014 as a small prayer room operated by international students from Kyungpook National University (KNU). The students had purchased a house near the university's west gate to use as a prayer space. The community grew to include between 80 and 150 students from countries such as Pakistan, Nigeria, and Bangladesh.

=== Construction and controversy ===
In September 2020, the Buk-gu District office approved the construction of a new, permanent two-story mosque building to replace the old, inadequate house. However, in early 2021,local residents began protesting the construction, citing concerns about noise, cooking odors, traffic congestion, and potential negative effects on their property values. In February 2021, the district office issued an administrative order to halt construction, citing residents' complaints.

The Muslim community challenged the order in court. In December 2021, the Daegu District Court ruled in their favor, a decision that was later upheld by the Supreme Court, allowing construction to resume.

Following the court's decision, opposition from some residents intensified and took on anti-Islamic characteristics. Protesters displayed banners with messages such as "Absolute opposition to the mosque, a hotbed of terrorism>" and "Muslims who brutally kill and behead people, terrorists, leave now!". A series of provocative acts targeted the Muslim community, including:

- Display of pig heads: Severed pig heads were placed in the alley facing the construction site and a temporary prayer hall on multiple occasions. As pigs are considered unclean in Islam and pork is forbidden (Haram), this act was widely interpreted as a deliberate insult to the Muslim community.
- Pork barbecues: Opposing residents held pork barbecue parties near the construction site, which they described as community gatherings.
- Physical obstruction: Residents at times physically blocked the entrance to the construction site with vehicles.

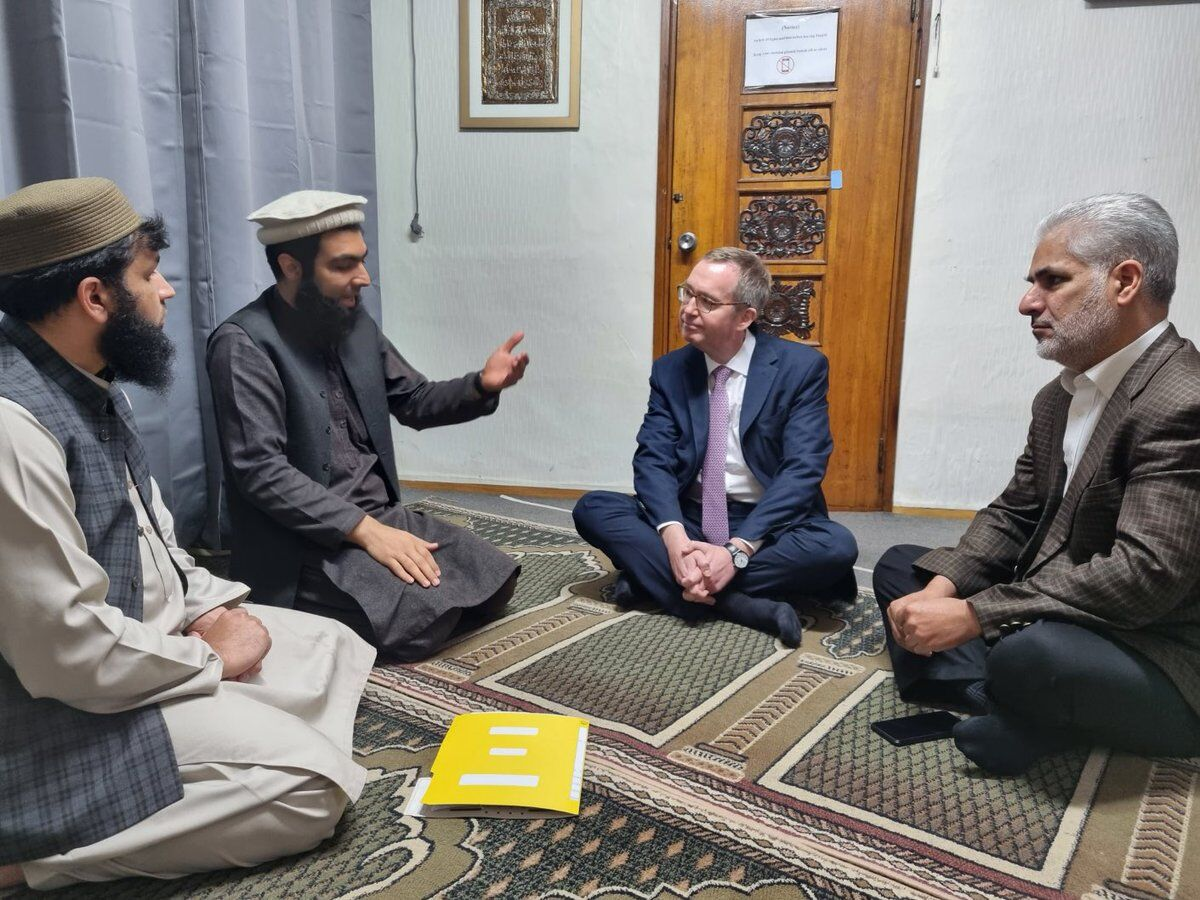
Colin Crooks Visits Dar-ul-Emaan Kyungpook Islamic Center on 24 March 2023

The National Human Rights Commission of Korea condemned these actions. In a statement in March 2023, the commission characterized the display of pork in front of the mosque as "hate speech" and "a classic expression of hatred towards minorities on the basis of race and religion," calling for it to stop immediately. The commission had also previously ruled that the administrative order halting construction was discriminatory and recommended policy actions to protect freedom of religion.

The conflict attracted international attention, with the British Ambassador to South Korea visiting the site in March 2023. Commentary noted that the situation highlighted challenges in South Korea's approach to multiculturalism and the lack of a comprehensive anti-discrimination law.

== See also ==
- Islam in South Korea
- List of mosques in South Korea
