= List of mosques in South Korea =

This is a list of mosques in South Korea. It lists mosques (Arabic: Masjid, Korean: 이슬람 사원) and Islamic centres in South Korea .

According to Poi data, as of 2025 there is 208 mosques in South Korea. 4.33% mosques are in Dalseo District.

== History ==
The construction of Mosques been documented since the mid 7th century, when Muslim traders had been traversing the East Asian region since the Tang Dynasty period and formed a treaty with Silla, one of the Three Kingdoms of Korea. Later, the entry of Islam in South Korea can be verified as starting from the 9th century during the Unified Silla period after the arrival of Persian and Arab traders and navigators. This is a list of mosques in South Korea.

== List ==
| Name | Korean | Images | Location | Year/century | Remarks |
|---|---|---|---|---|---|
| Busan Al-Fatah Mosque | 한국 이슬람 부산성원 | | Busan | 1980 | This was built after the Seoul Mosque with donations from Korean Muslims. |
| Kwangju Mosque | 경기 광주 이슬람 성원 | | | 1981 | It was opened in June 1981 |
| | | | | 1950 | It was a temporary mosque built for Turkish soldiers. |
| Islamic Center of Daejeon | 대전 이슬라믹 센터 | | Daejeon | 2006 | This is the third Mosque to be built in South Korea. |
| Seoul Central Mosque | 서울 중앙 성원 | | Seoul | 1976 | The first mosque in South Korea. It consists of an office and meeting room on the first floor, male prayer hall in the second floor and the third floor is for women. The population that frequents this mosque mostly consists of Non-Korean. Islamic rules and customs should be respected if visiting. This includes but is not limited to wearing attire that covers the entire body, and refraining from smoking. Non-Muslims may enter the mosque, but should refrain from taking photos or exhibiting any behavior that may disrupt worshipers. |
| Jeonju Abu Bakr Al‑Seddiq Mosque | | | Jeonju | 1985 | |
| Anyang Rabita Al-Alam Al-Islamic Masjid | | | Anyang | 1986 | It is converted from church to Mosque. It is also known as Rabitah Mosque.; Currently it is not in existence, in 2019 it was demolished due to local issues |
| Ansan Mosque | | | Ansan | 2007 | In 2017 this Mosque was attacked by Islamophobic person. |
| Jeju Rahman Mosque | | | Jeju Island | | It's managed by Jeju Islamic Cultural Centre (JICC) |
| Jeju Islamic Cultural Centre | | | Jeju Island | | |
| Bupyeong Mosque | | | Incheon | | |
| Daegu Islamic Center | | | Daegu | | |
| Paju Mosque | | | Gyeonggi | | |
| Al-Fatah Mosque | | | Seoul | | |
| Gwangju Centre And Mosque | | | Gwangsan | 1981 | The third Mosque built in South Korea. |

== See also ==
- Islam in Korea
- Ar-Rahman Mosque
- Lists of mosques

== Sources ==
- Astuti, Fitriana (2017-04-03). Moslem Traveler: Korea Selatan (in Indonesian). Elex Media Komputindo. pp. 196–205. ISBN 978-602-04-0372-4.
- Ghazi, Ahmad Faris Naqiyuddin Mohd; Fathil, Fauziah (2017-06-13). Islam in South Korea: Progress and Challenges of Da'wah Activities Since the 1950s. IIUM PRESS. ISBN 978-967-418-516-9.
- Ryu, Yihyun (2024-02-01), Local Government Administration And Biopolitics: Surrounding Conflicts Over The Construction of Mosque In South Korea (SSRN Scholarly Paper), Rochester, New York, doi:10.2139/ssrn.4712806, SSRN 4712806, 4712806
