= Saha District =

District of Busan, South Korea

Coordinates: 35°06′06″N 128°58′20″E

Saha
- Autonomous District
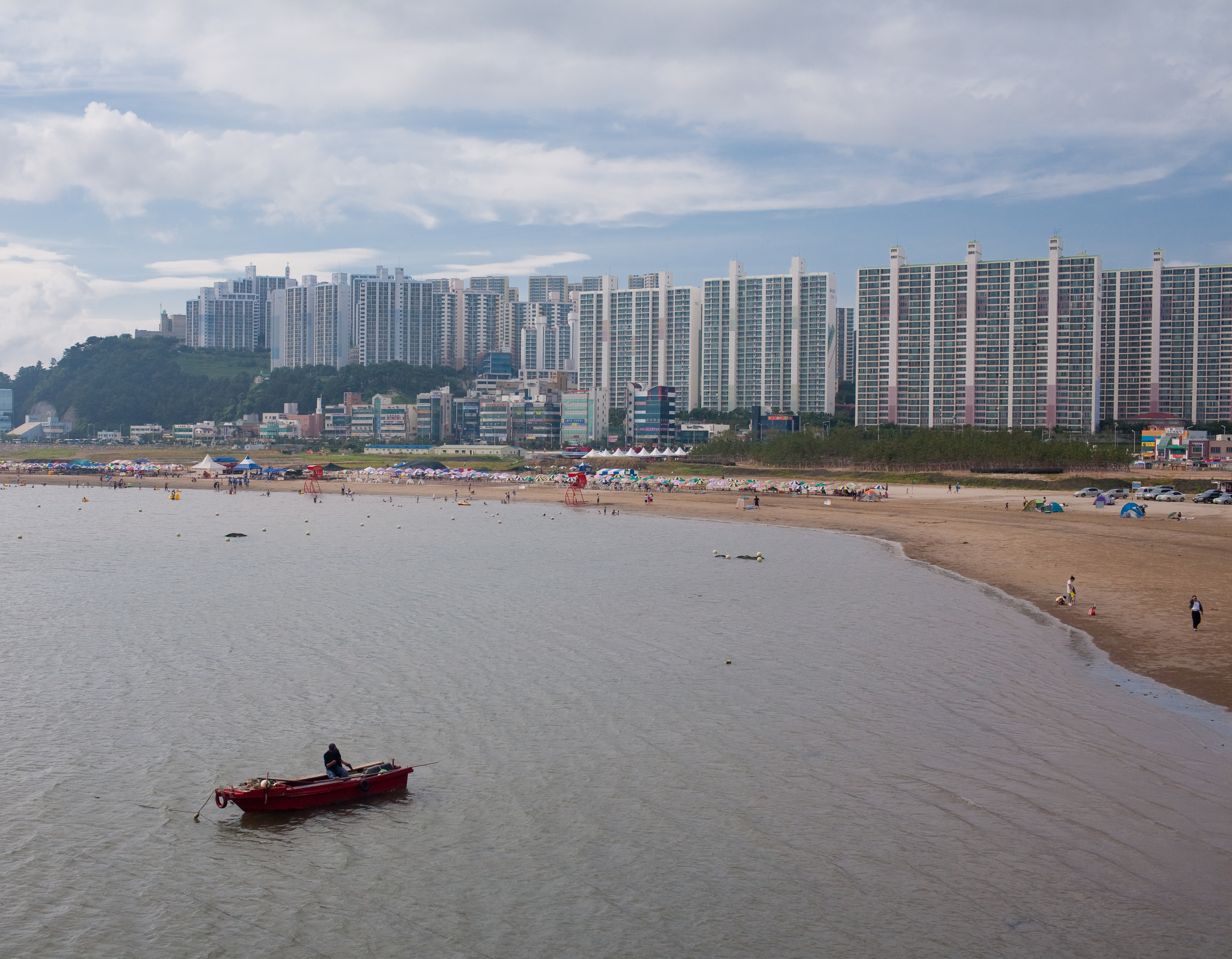

- Flag

- Country: South Korea
- Region: Yeongnam
- Provincial level: Busan
- Administrative divisions: 16 administrative dong

Government
  - Mayor: Kim Tae-seok (김태석)

Area
  - Total: 41.77 km^{2} (16.13 sq mi)

Population (2024)
  - Total: 292,717
  - Density: 7,008/km^{2} (18,150/sq mi)
  - Dialect: Gyeongsang
- Website: Saha District Office

Korean name
- Hangul: 사하구
- Hanja: 沙下區
- RR: Saha-gu
- MR: Saha-gu

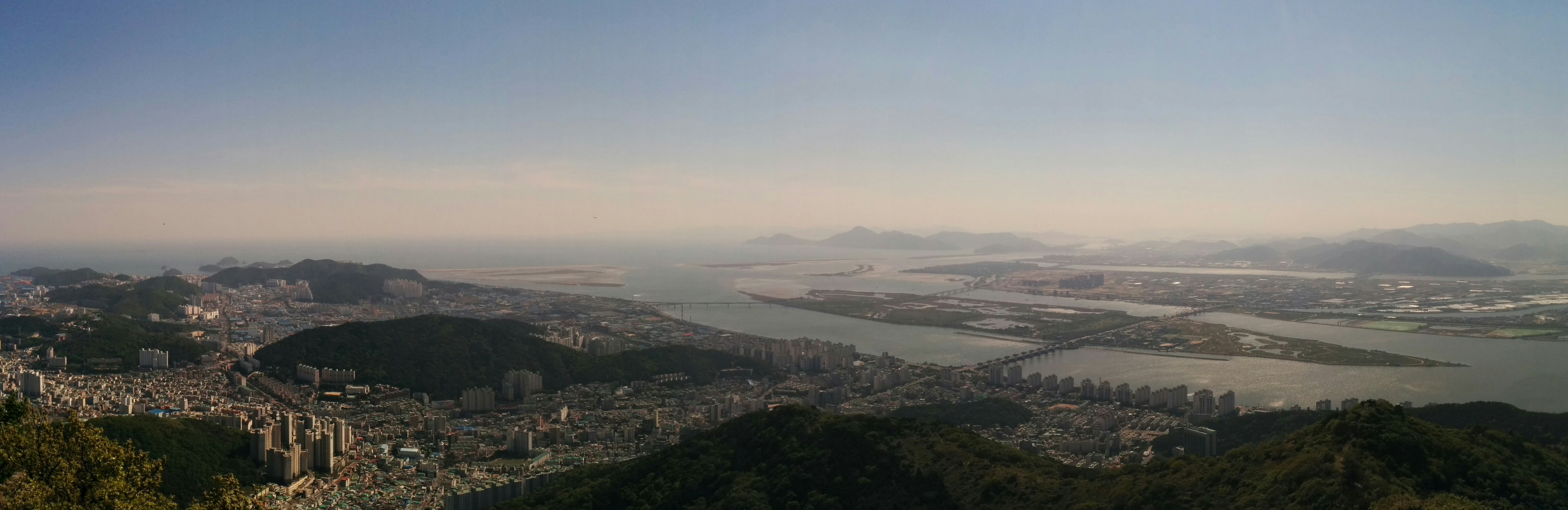
Panorama of Saha District

Saha District (Korean: 사하구) is a gu in western Busan, South Korea. It has an area of 40.89 km^{2}, and a population of about 375,000. About a third of the area is forest land. Saha District became a gu of Busan in 1983. It is home to the Seunghak Campus of Dong-A University.

== Administrative divisions ==
Administrative divisions

Saha District is divided into 8 legal dong, which all together comprise 16 administrative dong, as follows:

- Goejeong-dong (4 administrative dong)
- Dangni-dong
- Hadan-dong (2 administrative dong)
- Sinpyeong-dong (2 administrative dong)
- Jangnim-dong (2 administrative dong)
- Dadae-dong (2 administrative dong)
- Gupyeong-dong
- Gamcheon-dong (2 administrative dong)

== Sister cities ==
- Dongli, China

== See also ==
- Busan
- Geography of South Korea
