= Dadaepo Beach station =

Station of the Busan Metro

095 다대포해수욕장 (몰운대) Dadaepo Beach (Morundae)
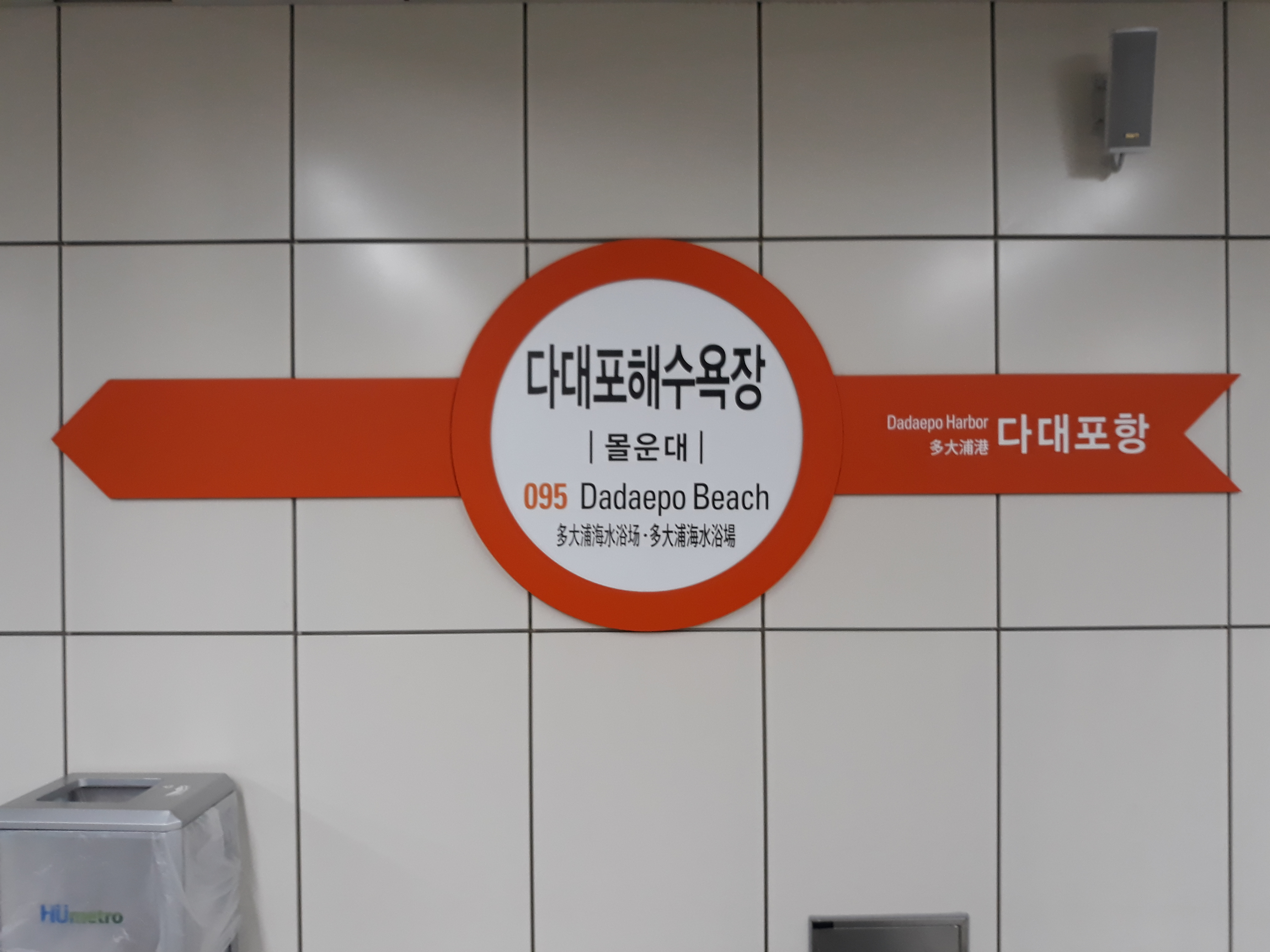

Korean name
- Hangul: 다대포해수욕장역
- Hanja: 多大浦海水浴場驛
- Revised Romanization: Dadaepo haesuyokjang yeok
- McCune–Reischauer: Tadaep'o haesuyokchang yŏk

General information
- Location: Dadae-dong, Saha District, Busan; South Korea
- Coordinates: 35.0481°N 128.9662°E
- Operator: Busan Transportation Corporation
- Line: Line 1
- Platforms: 2
- Tracks: 2

Construction
- Structure type: Underground

Other information
- Station code: 095

History
- Opened: April 20, 2017; 9 years ago

Services
Preceding station	Busan Metro	Following station
Terminus	Line 1	Dadaepo Harbor towards Nopo
Location

Dadaepo Beach Station (Korean: 다대포해수욕장역; Hanja: 多大浦海水浴場驛) is a station of the Busan Metro Line 1 in Dadae-dong, Saha District, Busan, South Korea.

== Station Layout ==
G	Street level	Exit

L1; Concourse	Lobby	Customer Service, Shops, Vending machines, ATMs

L2; Platforms	Side platform, doors will open on the right
L2; Platforms	Northbound	← Line 1 Alighting Passengers Only
L2; Platforms	Southbound	Line 1 toward Nopo (Dadaepo Harbor)→
L2; Platforms	Side platform, doors will open on the right
