= Geoje station =

Railway station in Busan, South Korea

거제; Geoje
306
거제 (법원·검찰청)
Geoje
(Court & Prosecutors' Office)
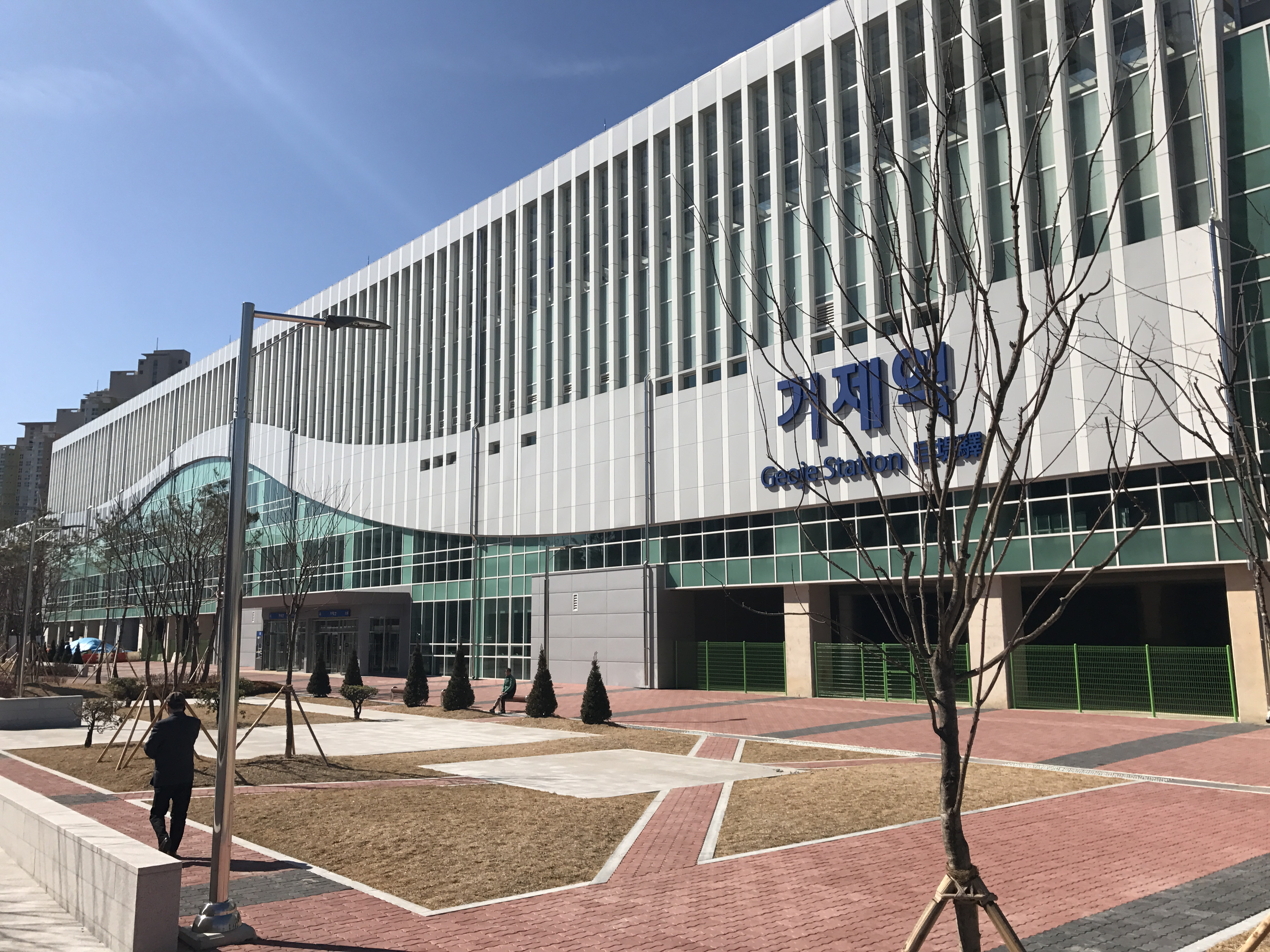

Korean name
- Hangul: 거제역
- Hanja: 巨堤驛
- Revised Romanization: Geoje-yeok
- McCune–Reischauer: Kŏje-yŏk

General information
- Location: Geoje-dong, Yeonje District, Busan; South Korea
- Coordinates: 35.1909°N 129.0760°E
- Operator: Busan Transportation Corporation; Korail
- Lines: Line 3 Donghae Line
- Platforms: 4
- Tracks: 4

Construction
- Structure type: Underground/Aboveground

Other information
- Station code: 306 (Line 3); K112 (Donghae Line)

History
- Opened: August 16, 1989; November 28, 2005 (Line 3)

Services
Preceding station	Busan Metro	Following station
Yeonsan towards Suyeong	Line 3	Sports Complex towards Daejeo
Geojehaemaji towards Bujeon	Donghae Line	Busan National University of Education towards Taehwagang
Location

Geoje Station (Korean: 거제역) is a station of the Busan Metro Line 3 and Donghae Line in Geoje-dong, Yeonje District, Busan, South Korea. The station is unrelated to the Geojehaemaji station of Korail. Nammungu station (Korean: 남문구역; Hanja: 南門口驛) on Donghae Line became Geojehaemaji station on December 30, 2016.

== Station Layout ==
=== Line 3 ===
Yeonsan ↑
S/B | | N/B
↓ Sports Complex

Southbound	← ● Line 3 toward Suyeong
Northbound	● Line 3 toward Daejeo →

=== Donghae Line ===
↑ Busan National University of Education
N/B | | S/B
Geojehaemaji ↓

Northbound	● Donghae Line toward Taehwagang →
Southbound	← ● Donghae Line toward Bujeon

== Gallery ==
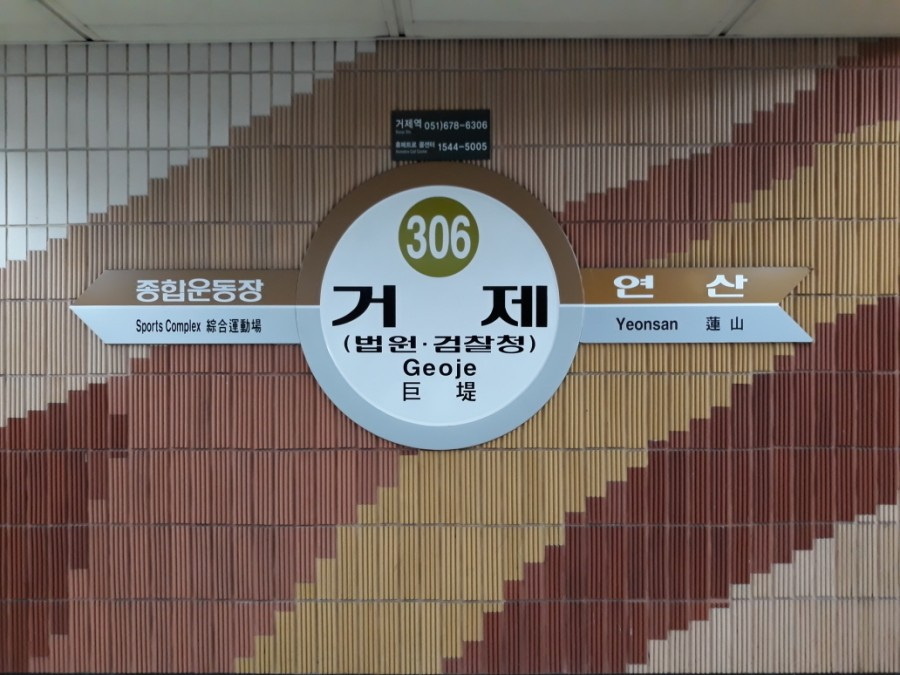
Station Sign (Line 3)

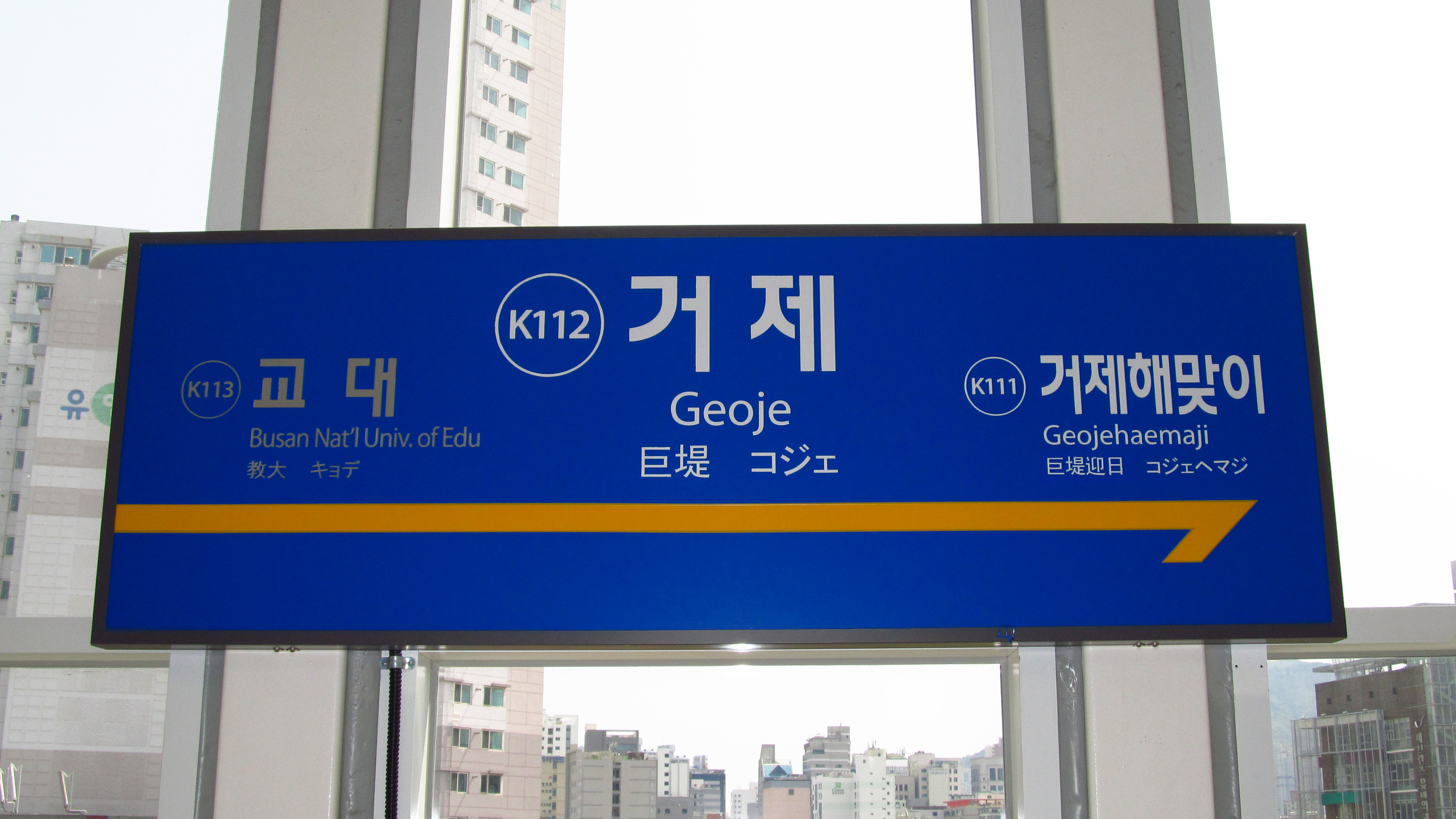
Station Sign (Donghae Line)

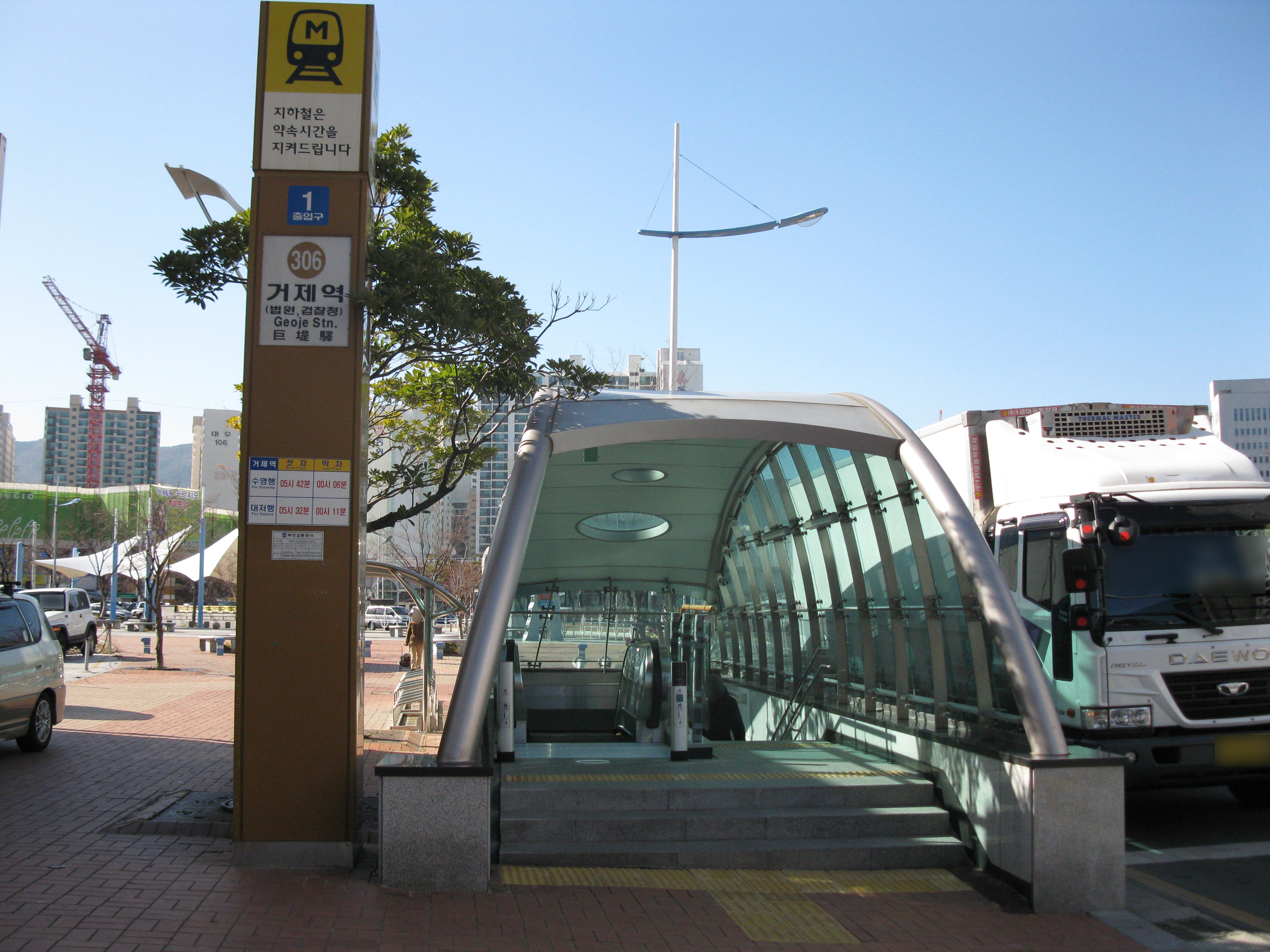
Line 3 station exit
