= Yeonsan station (Busan Metro) =

Station of the Busan Metro

123 305 연산 Yeonsan
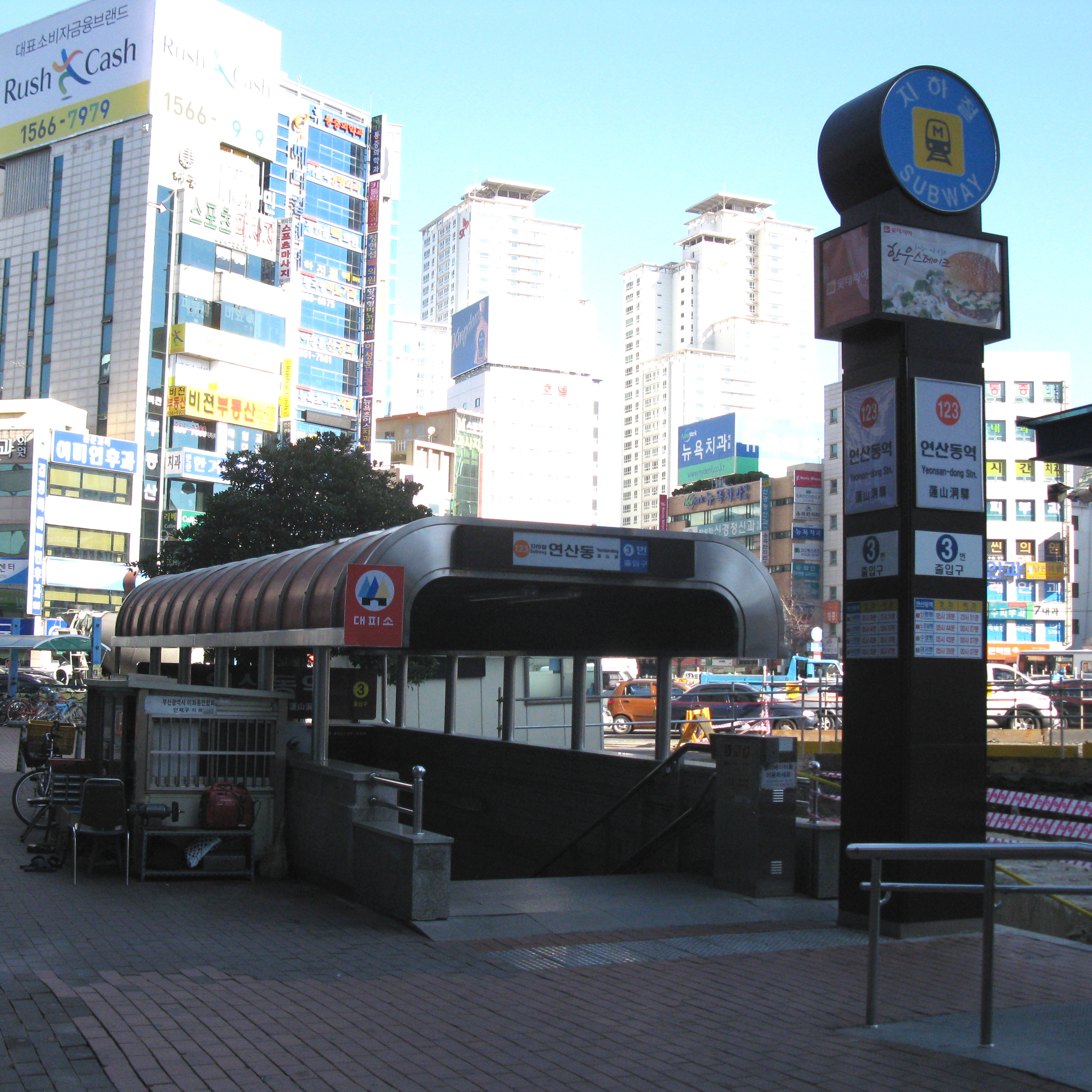

Korean name
- Hangul: 연산역
- Hanja: 蓮山驛
- Revised Romanization: Yeonsan yeok
- McCune–Reischauer: Yŏnsan yŏk

General information
- Location: Yeonsan-dong, Yeonje District, Busan; South Korea
- Coordinates: 35°11′10″N 129°04′54″E
- Operator: Busan Transportation Corporation
- Lines: Line 1 Line 3
- Platforms: 3
- Tracks: 4

Construction
- Structure type: Underground

Other information
- Station code: 122

History
- Opened: July 19, 1985; 41 years ago (Line 1); November 28, 2005; 20 years ago (Line 3)

Services
Preceding station	Busan Metro	Following station
City Hall towards Dadaepo Beach	Line 1	Busan National University of Education towards Nopo
Mulmangol towards Suyeong	Line 3	Geoje towards Daejeo
Location

Yeonsan Station (Korean: 연산역; Hanja: 蓮山驛) is a station of the Busan Metro Line 1 and Busan Metro Line 3 in Yeonsan-dong, Yeonje District, Busan, South Korea.

== Station Layout ==
=== Line 1 ===
↑ Busan National University of Education
N/B | | S/B
City Hall ↓

Northbound	● Line 1 toward Nopo →
Southbound	← ● Line 1 toward Dadaepo Beach

=== Line 3 ===
↑ Geoje
N/B | | S/B
Mulmangol ↓

Northbound	● Line 3 toward Daejeo →
Southbound	← ● Line 3 toward Suyeong

== Gallery ==
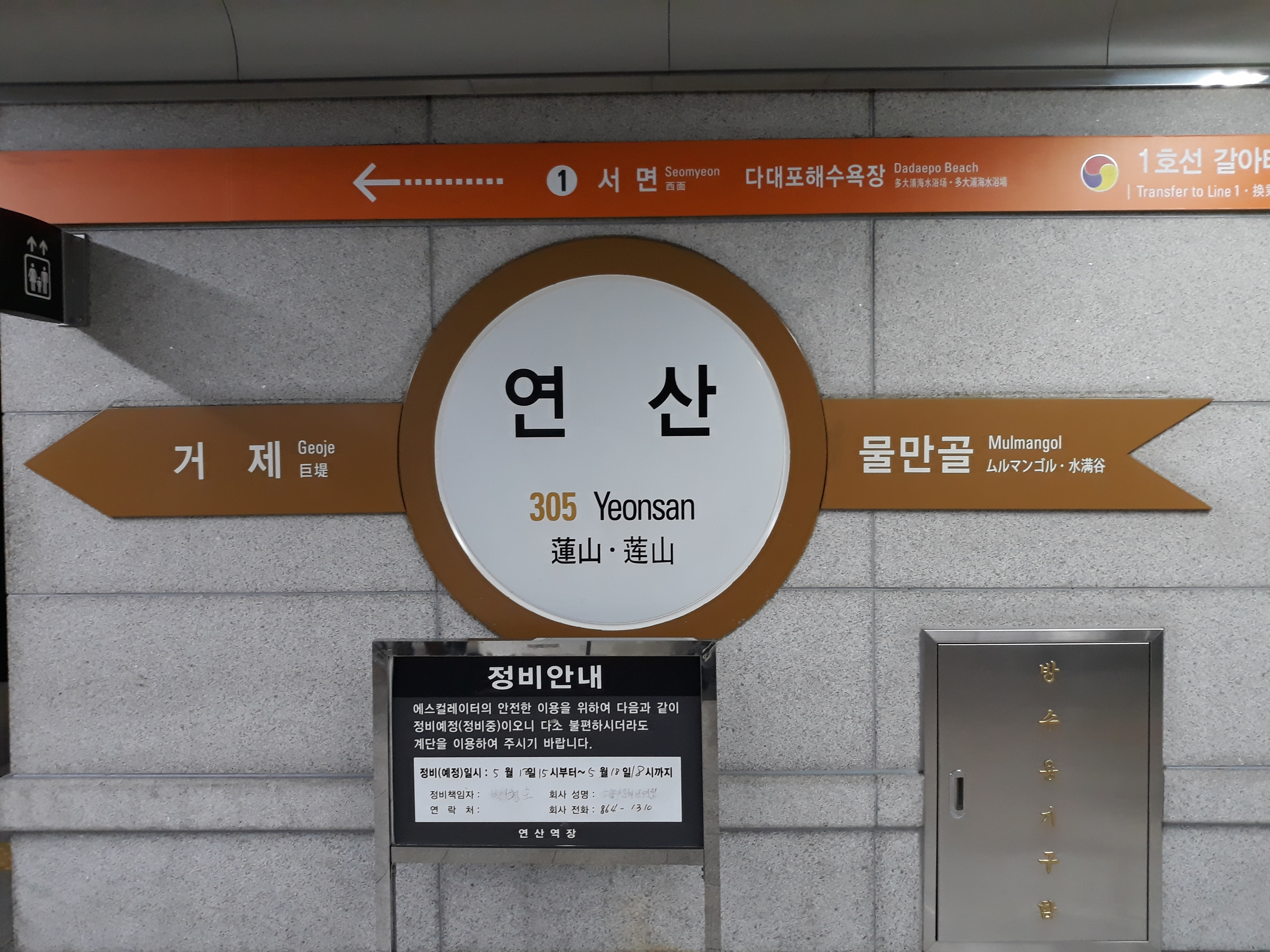
Station Sign (Line 3)

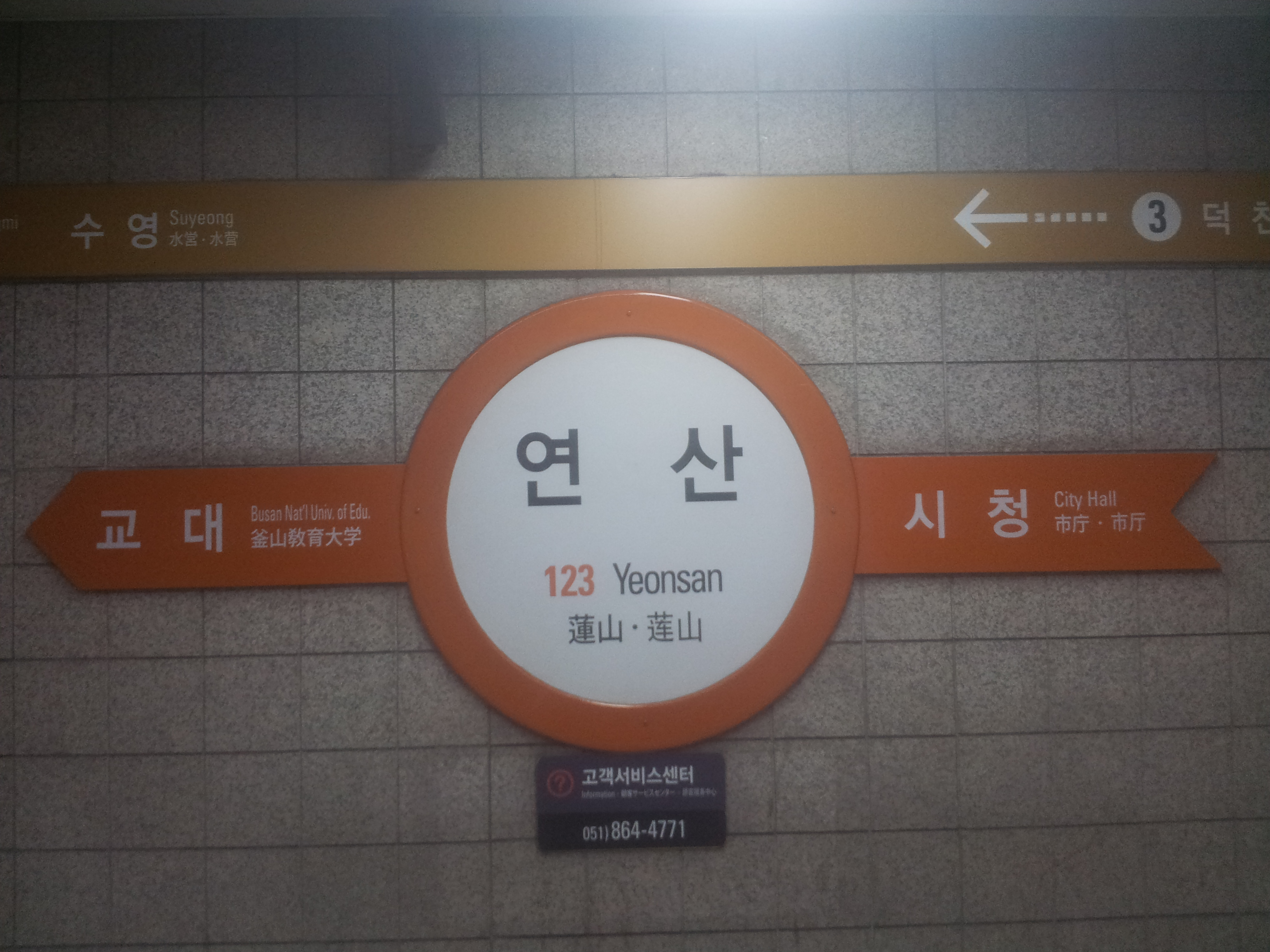
Station Sign (Line 1)
