= Baesan station =

Station of the Busan Metro

303 배산 Baesan
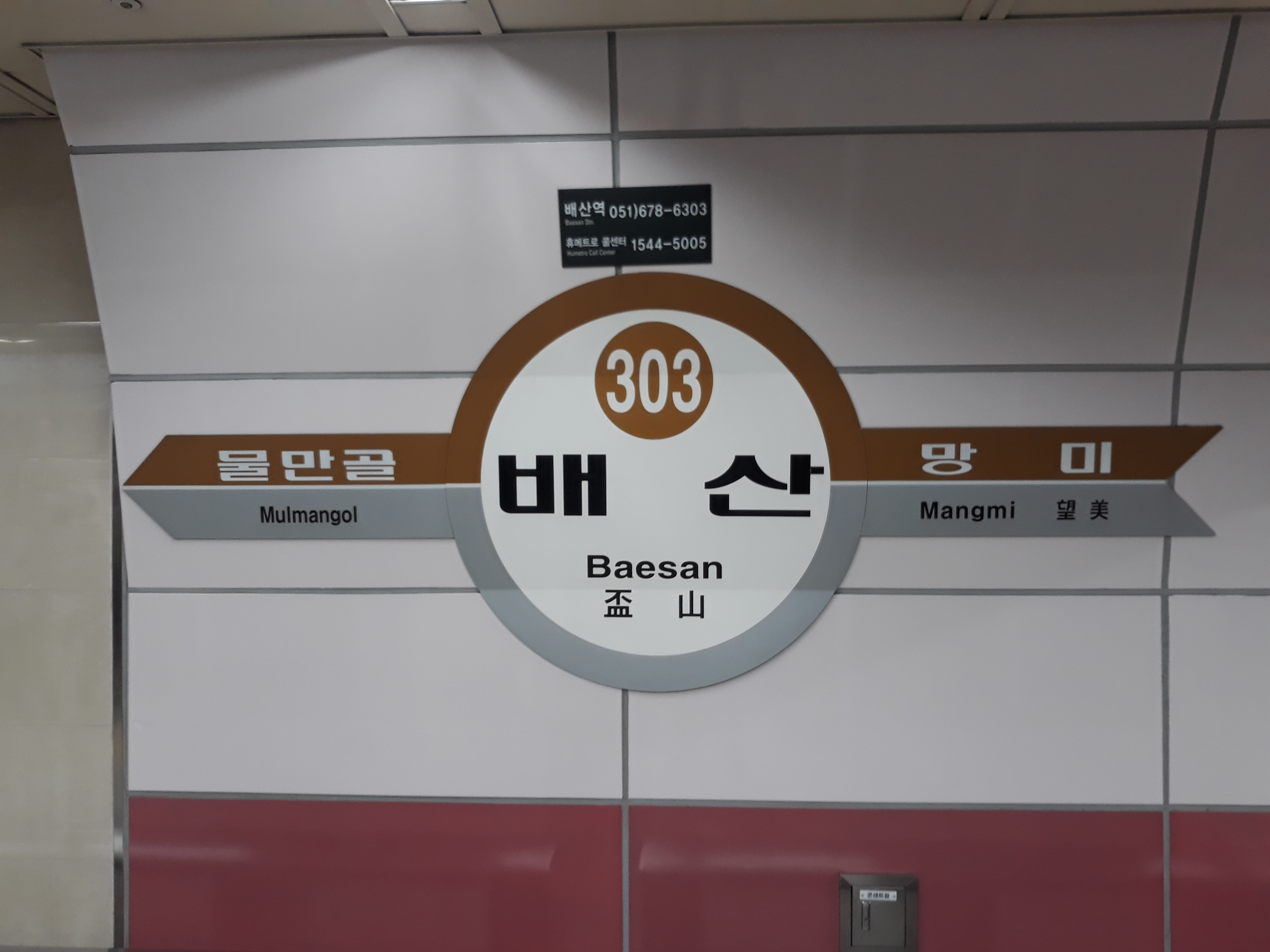

Korean name
- Hangul: 배산역
- Hanja: 盃山驛
- Revised Romanization: Baesan-yeok
- McCune–Reischauer: Paesan-yŏk

General information
- Location: Yeonsan-dong, Yeonje District, Busan; South Korea
- Coordinates: 35°10′25″N 129°05′44″E
- Operator: Busan Transportation Corporation
- Line: Busan Metro Line 3
- Platforms: 2
- Tracks: 2

Construction
- Structure type: Underground

Other information
- Station code: 303

History
- Opened: November 28, 2005

Services
Preceding station	Busan Metro	Following station
Mangmi towards Suyeong	Line 3	Mulmangol towards Daejeo
Location

Baesan Station (Korean: 배산역; Hanja: 盃山驛) is a station of the Busan Metro Line 3 in Yeonsan-dong, Yeonje District, Busan, South Korea.

== Station Name Origin ==
The station's name comes from the nearby Baesan Mountain. The name "Baesan" derives from the mountain's shape, which resembles an overturned glass.

== Station Structure ==
Features a two-sided, two-track platform. Due to its location on Mangmi Pass, the platform is located deep. Located on the eighth underground level, it is the second deepest station on the Busan Metro after Mandeok Station. The platform is equipped with fully enclosed platform screen doors. There are six exits.

- Crossing from the opposite side: possible

== Nearby ==
- Baesan
- Mangmi Middle School
- Yeonmi Elementary School
- Yeonsan Hospital
- Yeonsan Nursing Hospital
- Yeonsan 3-dong Administrative Welfare Center
- Yeonsan Police Station
- Yeonsan-dong Post Office
- Busan Bank Yeonmi Branch
- Yeonsan Hyundai Apartments

== Changes in Passenger Traffic ==
Route	Number of Passengers								References
Route	2005	2006	2007	2008	2009	2010	2011	2012	References
Line 3	3055	3707	3668	3883	4079	4213	4451	4506	
Route	2013	2014	2015	2016	2017	2018	2019	2020	
Line 3	4582	4641	4568	?	?	?	?	?	
