= Mulmangol station =

Station of the Busan Metro

304 물만골 Mulmangol
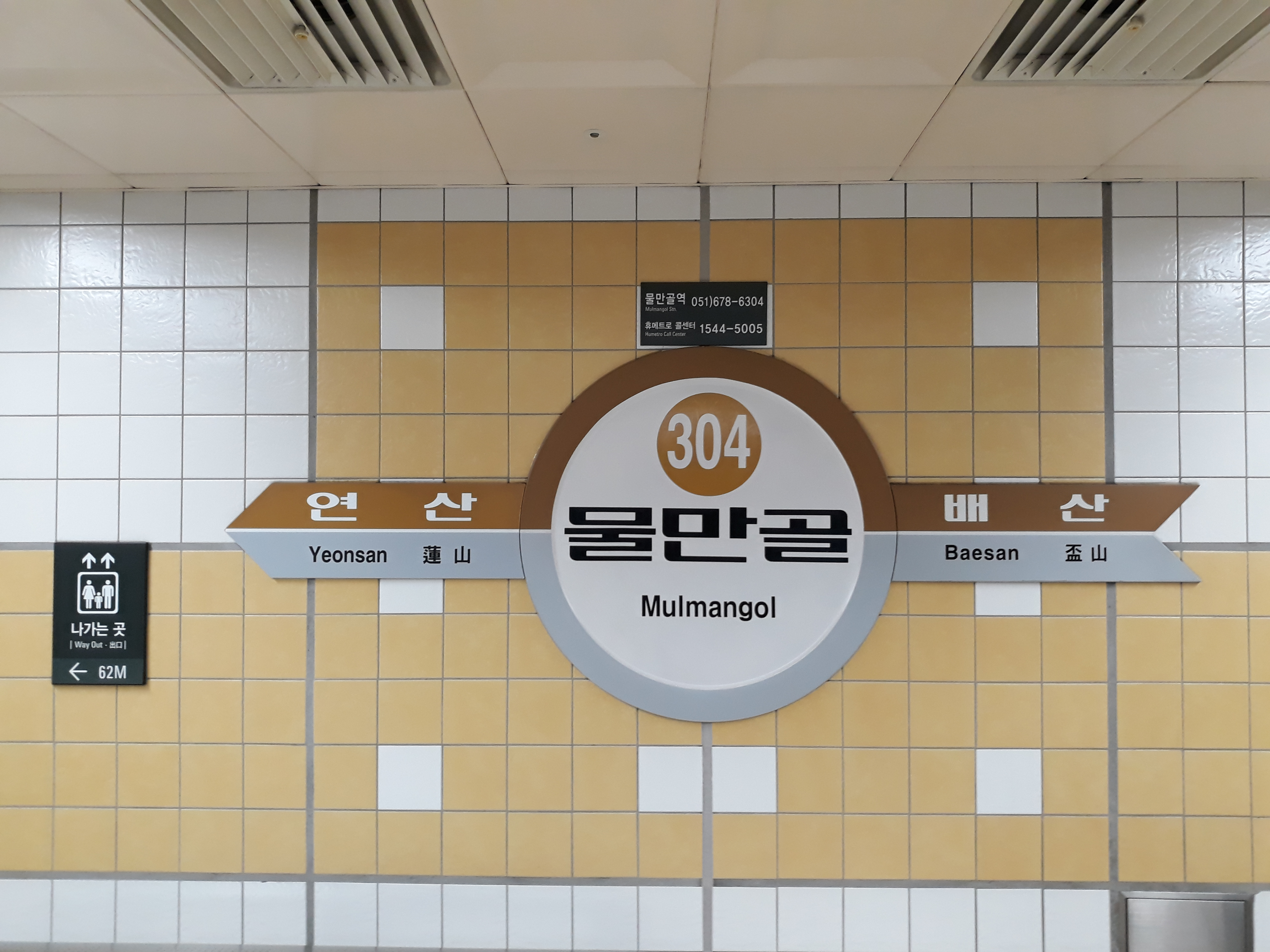

Korean name
- Hangul: 물만골역
- Hanja: 물만골驛
- Revised Romanization: Mulmangol yeok
- McCune–Reischauer: Mulmankol yŏk

General information
- Location: Yeonsan-dong, Yeonje District, Busan; South Korea
- Coordinates: 35.1766°N 129.0858°E
- Operator: Busan Transportation Corporation
- Line: Busan Metro Line 3
- Platforms: 2
- Tracks: 2

Construction
- Structure type: Underground

Other information
- Station code: 304

History
- Opened: November 28, 2005
Location

Mulmangol Station (Korean: 물만골역) is a station of Busan Metro Line 3 in Yeonsan-dong, Yeonje District, Busan, South Korea.

Preceding station	Busan Metro	Following station
Baesan towards Suyeong	Line 3	Yeonsan towards Daejeo
