= Geojehaemaji station =

Railway station in Busan, South Korea

Coordinates: 35.1822°N 129.0690°E

거제해맞이; Geojehaemaji
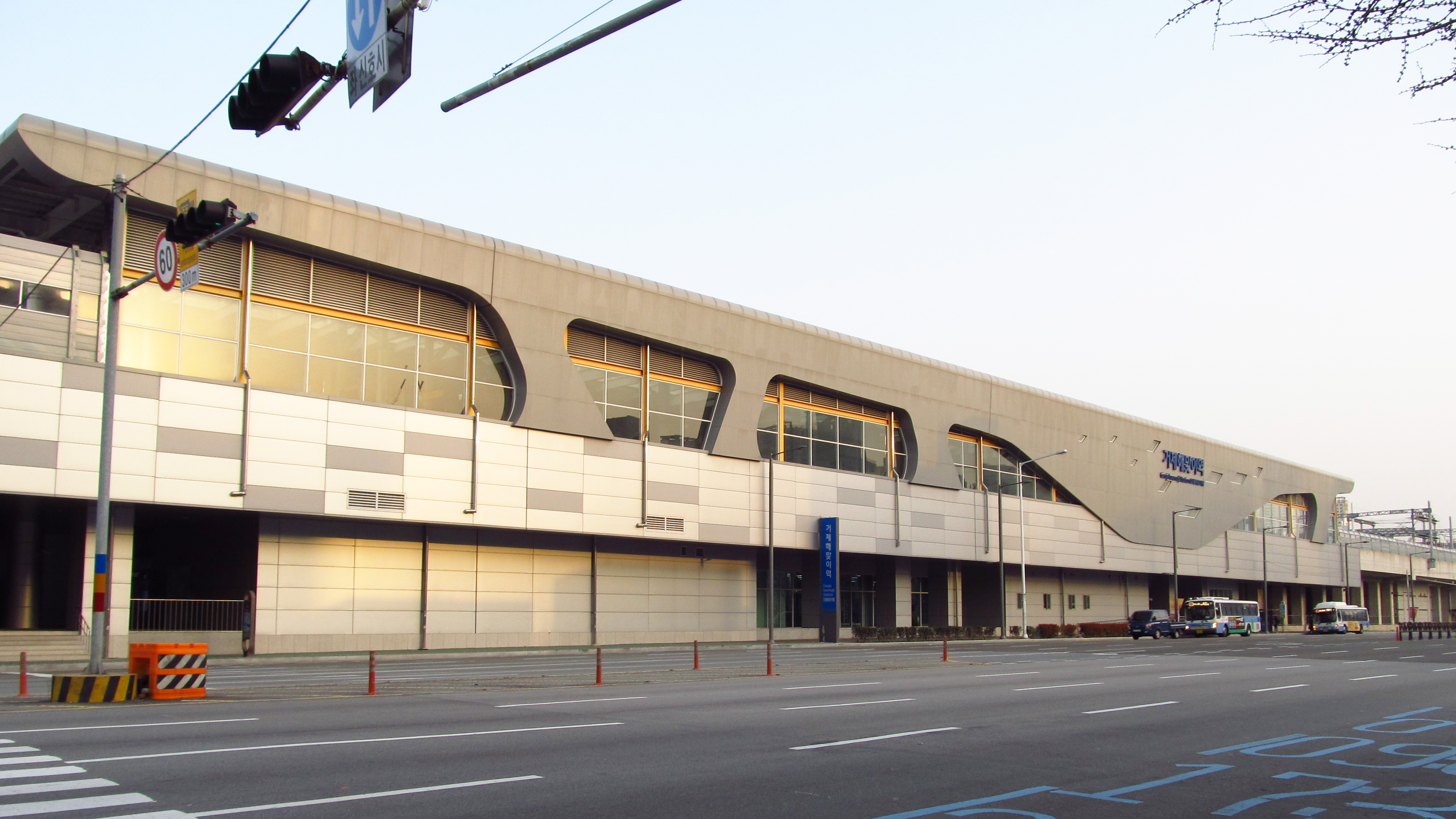

Korean name
- Hangul: 거제해맞이역
- Hanja: 巨堤해맞이驛
- Revised Romanization: Geojehaemaji-yeok
- McCune–Reischauer: Kŏjehaemaji-yŏk

General information
- Location: Geoje-dong, Yeonje District, Busan; South Korea
- Operator: Korail
- Line: Donghae Line
- Platforms: 2
- Tracks: 4

Construction
- Structure type: Aboveground

History
- Opened: December 1, 1940

Services
Preceding station	Busan Metro	Following station
Bujeon Terminus	Donghae Line	Geoje towards Taehwagang
Location

Geojehaemaji station (Korean: 거제해맞이역) is a railway station of the Donghae Line in Geoje-dong, Yeonje District, Busan, South Korea. The station is unrelated to the Geoje station of Busan Metro.

== Station layout ==
L2; Platforms	Side platform, doors will open on the right
L2; Platforms	Northbound	Donghae toward Taehwagang (Geoje)→
L2; Platforms	Southbound	← Donghae toward Bujeon (Terminus)
L2; Platforms	Side platform, doors will open on the right

L1; Concourse	Lobby	Customer service, shops, vending machines, ATMs

G	Street level	Exit

== Gallery ==
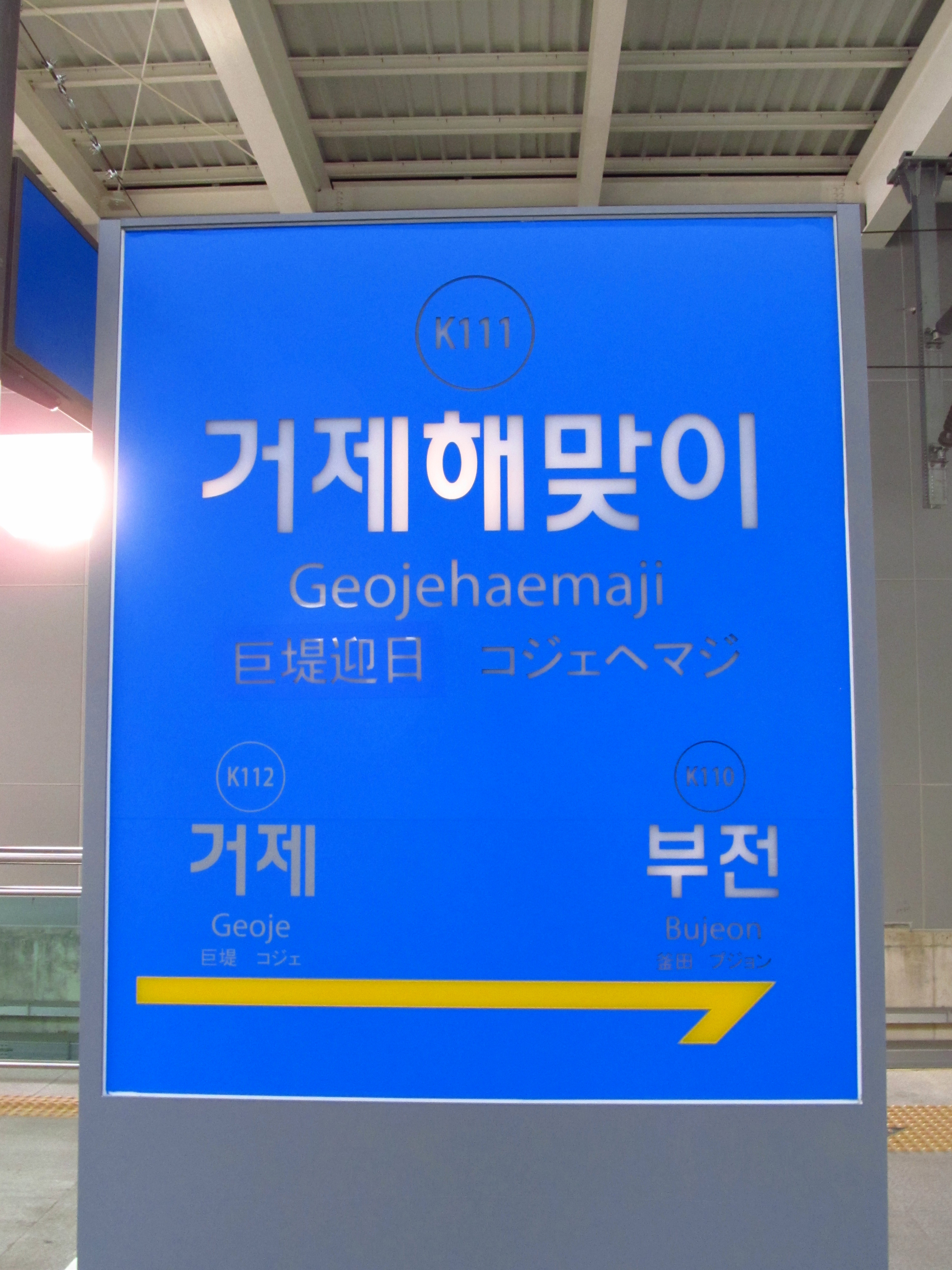
Station sign

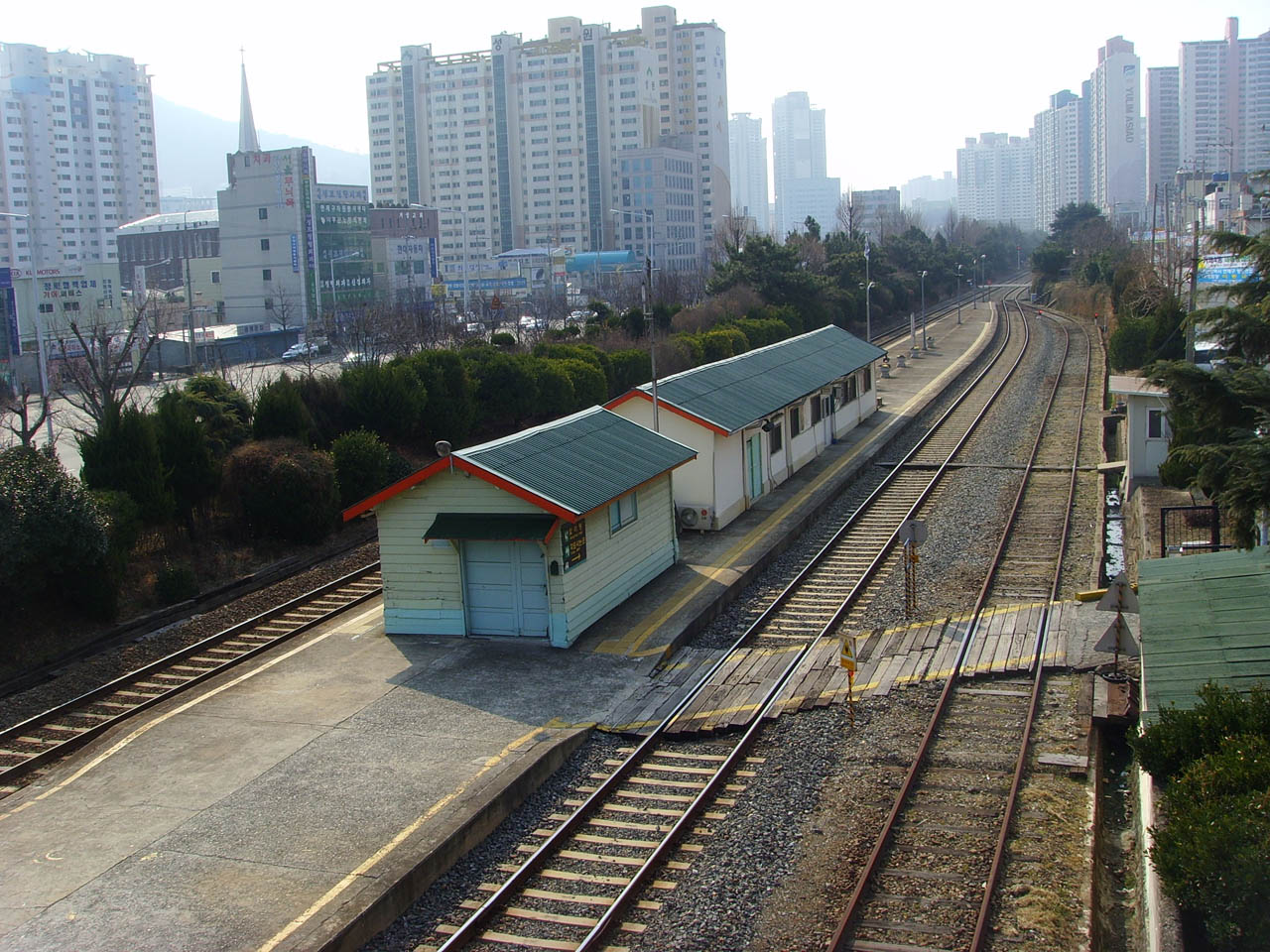
Former station (now demolished)
