= City Hall station (Busan Metro) =

Station of the Busan Metro

122 시청 (연제) City Hall (Yeonje)
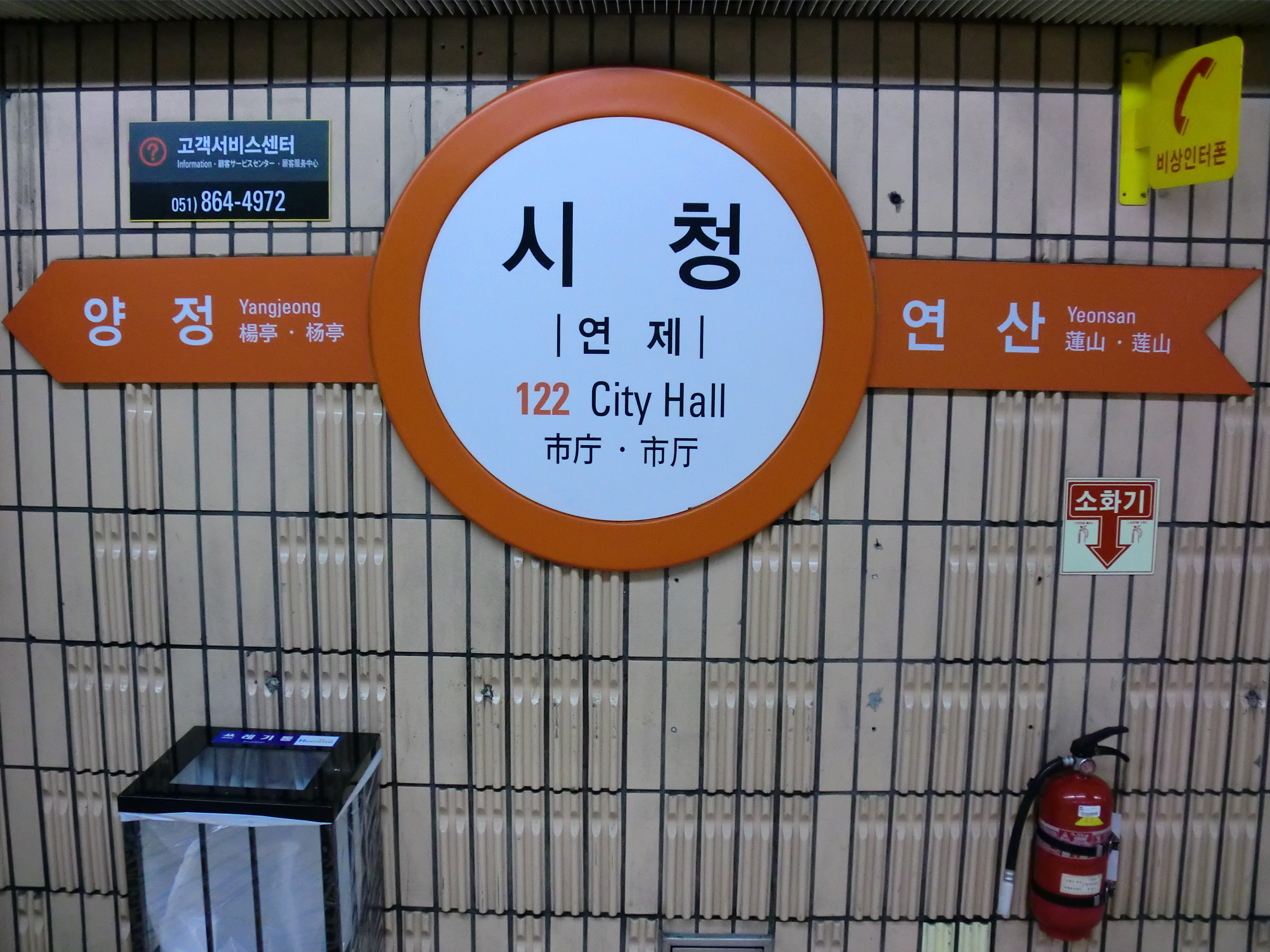

Korean name
- Hangul: 시청역
- Hanja: 市廳驛
- Revised Romanization: Sicheong-yeok
- McCune–Reischauer: Sich'ŏng-yŏk

General information
- Location: Yeonsan-dong, Yeonje District, Busan; South Korea
- Coordinates: 35°10′47″N 129°04′36″E
- Operator: Busan Transportation Corporation
- Line: Line 1
- Platforms: 2
- Tracks: 2

Construction
- Structure type: Underground

Other information
- Station code: 122

History
- Opened: July 19, 1985; 41 years ago

Services
Preceding station	Busan Metro	Following station
Yangjeong towards Dadaepo Beach	Line 1	Yeonsan towards Nopo
Location

City Hall Station (Korean: 시청역; Hanja: 市廳驛) is a Busan Metro Line 1 station in Yeonsan-dong, Yeonje District, Busan, South Korea.

== Incidents ==
A fire started at the station at 5:14 pm on July 16, 2014. No one died, but five people were injured and over 400 had to be evacuated. The fire was caused by an external power supply air conditioner. The line resumed normal operations by 6:55 pm the same day.

== Station Layout ==
G	Street level	Exit

L1; Concourse	Lobby	Customer Service, Shops, Vending machines, ATMs

L2; Platforms	Side platform, doors will open on the right
L2; Platforms	Southbound	← Line 1 toward Dadaepo Beach (Yangjeong)
L2; Platforms	Northbound	Line 1 toward Nopo (Yeonsan)→
L2; Platforms	Side platform, doors will open on the right

== Gallery ==
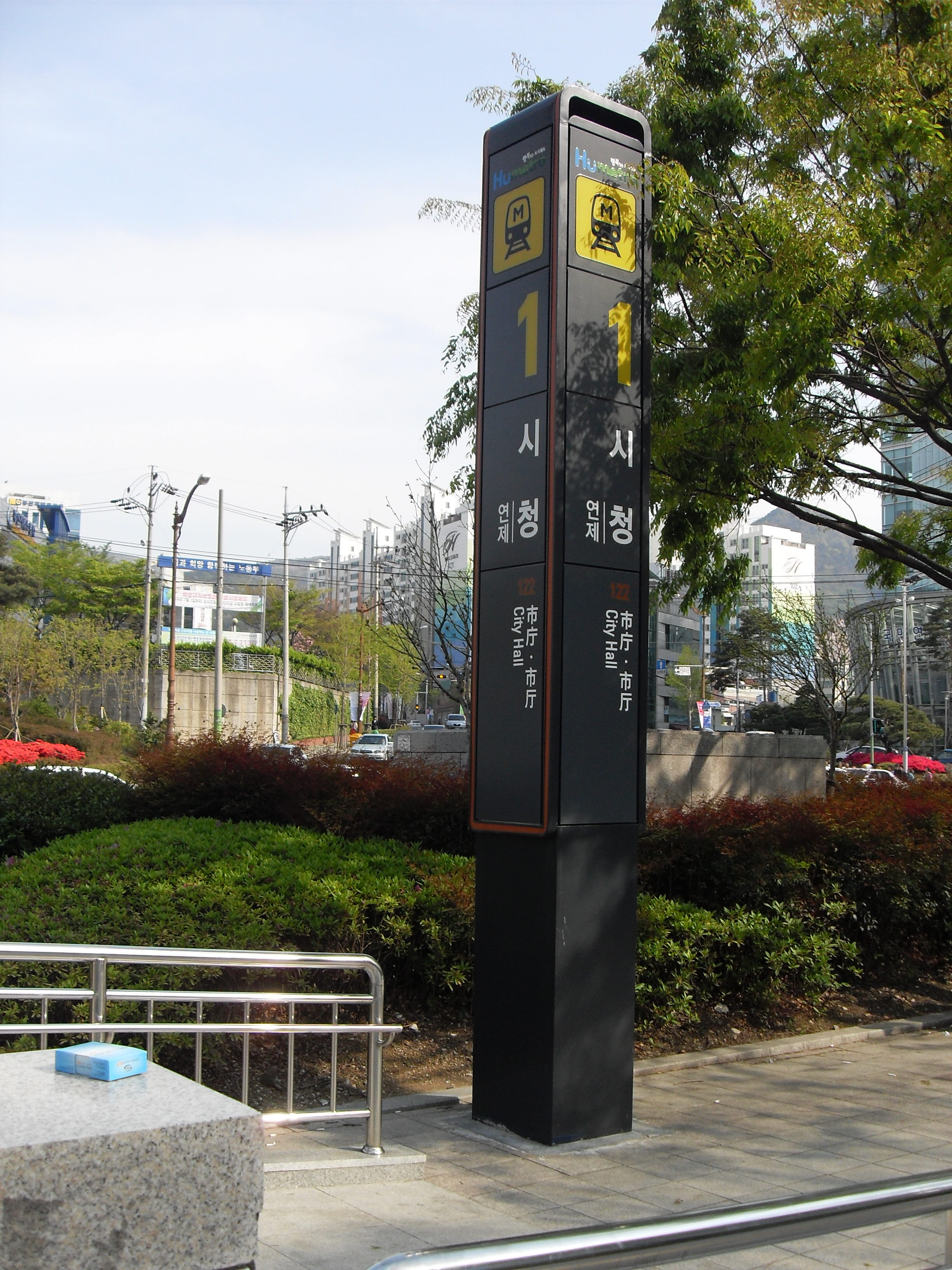
Pole Sign

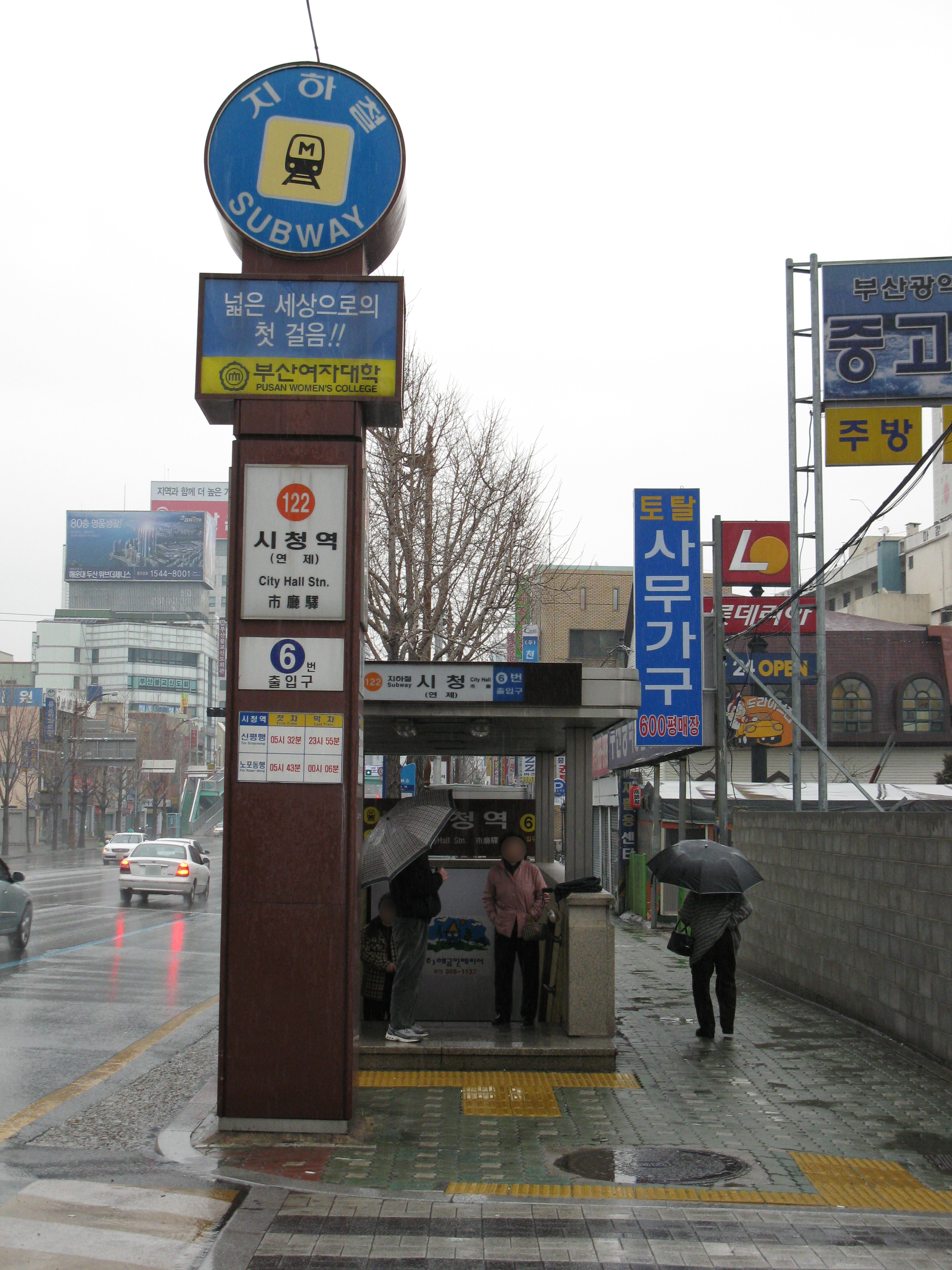
City Hall station No. 6 entrance
