= Sports Complex station (Busan Metro) =

Station of the Busan Metro

307 종합운동장 (부산의료원) Sports Complex (Busan Medical Center)
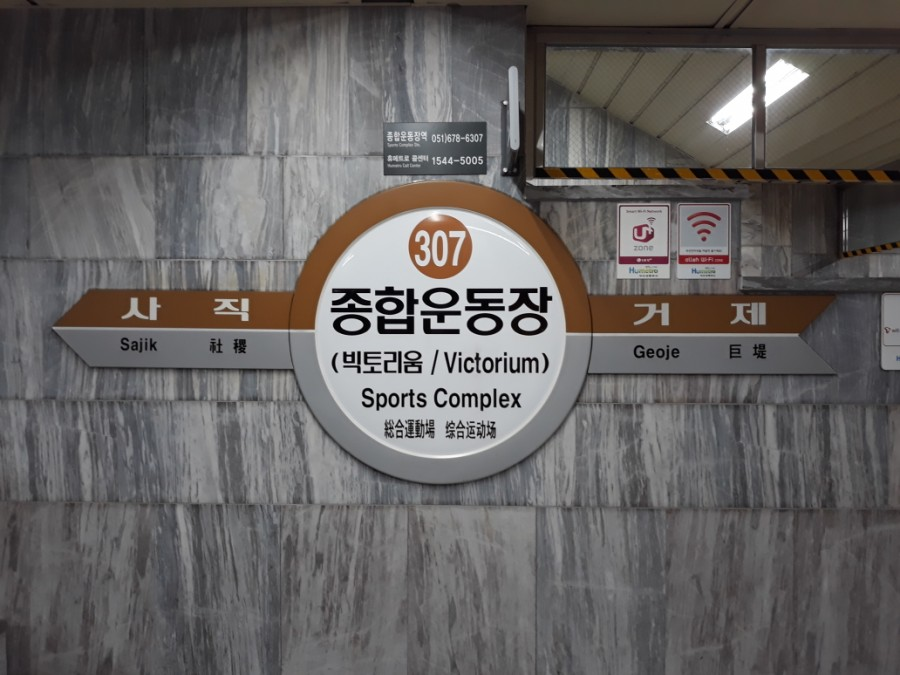

Korean name
- Hangul: 종합운동장역
- Hanja: 綜合運動場驛
- Revised Romanization: Jonghap-undongjang-yeok
- McCune–Reischauer: Chonghap-undongjang-yŏk

General information
- Location: Geoje-dong, Yeonje District, Busan; South Korea
- Coordinates: 35.1909°N 129.0676°E
- Operator: Busan Transportation Corporation
- Line: Busan Metro Line 3
- Platforms: 2
- Tracks: 2

Construction
- Structure type: Underground

Other information
- Station code: 307

History
- Opened: November 28, 2005

Services
Preceding station	Busan Metro	Following station
Geoje towards Suyeong	Line 3	Sajik towards Daejeo
Location

Sports Complex station (Korean: 종합운동장역; Hanja: 綜合運動場驛) is a station of Busan Metro Line 3 in Geoje-dong, Yeonje District, Busan, South Korea.

== Surrounding area ==
- Busan Asiad Main Stadium
- Sajik Baseball Stadium
