= Bujeon station =

Bujeon station (Korean: 부전역; Hanja: 釜田驛) may refer to two train stations in Busan, South Korea:

- Bujeon station (Korail), in Seomyeon, terminus of the Bujeon and Donghae lines
- Bujeon station (Busan Metro), in Bujeon-dong, Busanjin, on Busan Metro line 1
