= Busanwondong station =

Railway station in Busan, South Korea

부산원동; Busanwondong
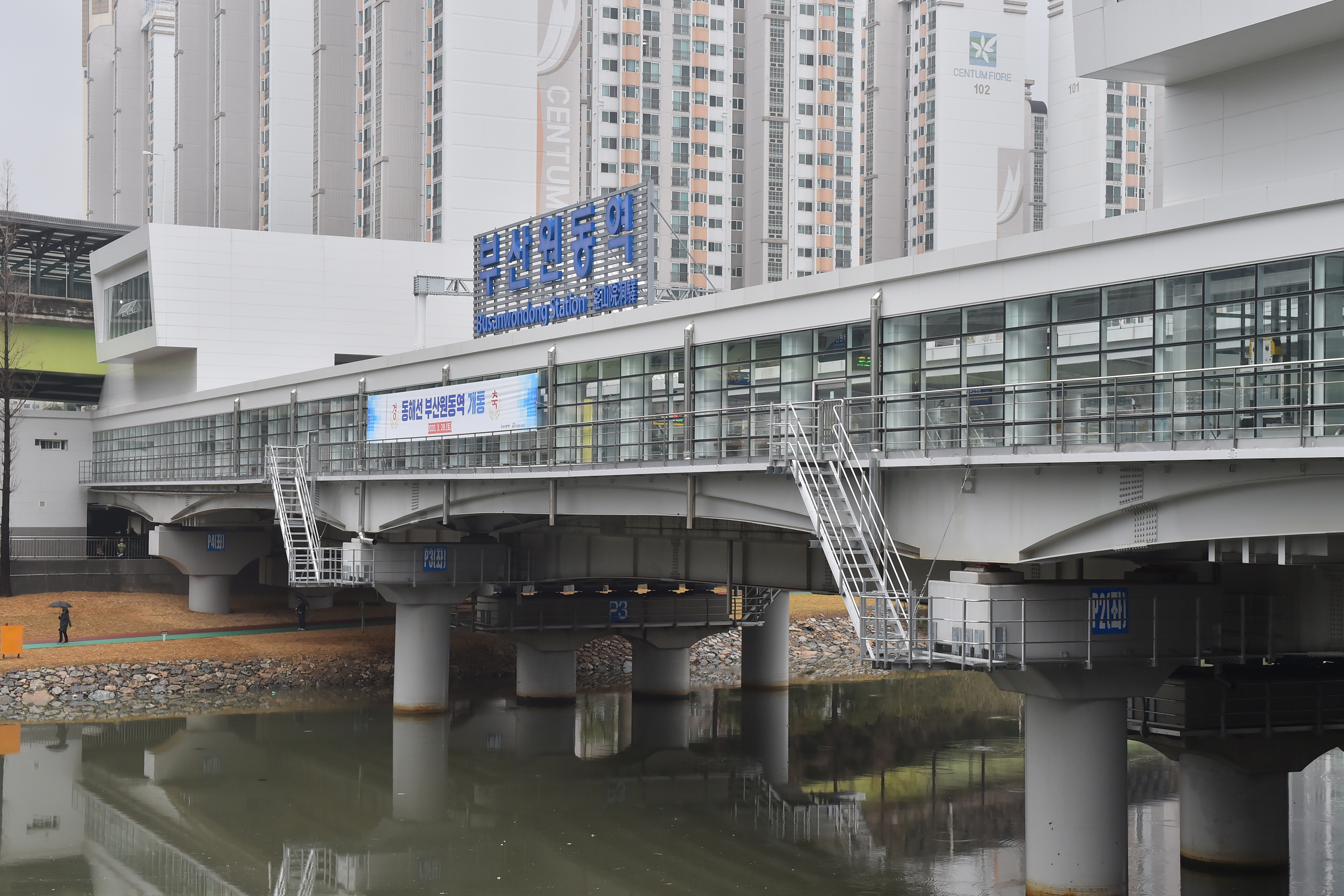

Korean name
- Hangul: 부산원동역
- Hanja: 釜山院洞驛
- Revised Romanization: Busanwondong yeok
- McCune–Reischauer: Pusanwondong yŏk

General information
- Coordinates: 35.19361°N 129.11417°E
- Operated by: Korail
- Line: Donghae Line
- Platforms: 2
- Tracks: 2

Construction
- Structure type: Aboveground

History
- Opened: March 28, 2020

Services
Preceding station	Busan Metro	Following station
Allak towards Bujeon	Donghae Line	Jaesong towards Taehwagang
Location

Busanwondong station (Korean: 부산원동역; Hanja: 釜山院洞驛) is a railway station of the Donghae Line between Allak-dong, Dongnae District and Banyeo-dong, Haeundae District, Busan, South Korea. The station is unrelated to the Wondong station of Gyeongbu Railway. The groundbreaking ceremony was held on August 8, 2017 and was opened on March 28, 2020.
