= Yangjeong station =

Yangjeong station may refer to:

- Yangjeong station (Busan Metro), on Busan Metro Line 1, in Busan, Korea
- Yangjeong station (Namyangju), on Jungang Line, in Namyangju, Gyeonggi-do, Korea
- Yangjeong station (Sangju), on Gyeongbuk Line, in Sangju, Gyeongsangbuk-do, Korea
