= Sports Complex station =

Sports Complex station (Korean: 종합운동장역) is a railroad station in South Korea.

- Sports Complex station (Seoul)
- Sports Complex station (Busan Metro)
