= Dongnae Station =

Dongnae Station (Korean: 동래역; Hanja: 東萊驛) refers to two railroad stations in Busan, South Korea.

- Dongnae station (Korail)
- Dongnae station (Busan Metro)
