= Sports Park station (Busan Metro) =

Station of the Busan Metro

316 체육공원 Sports Park
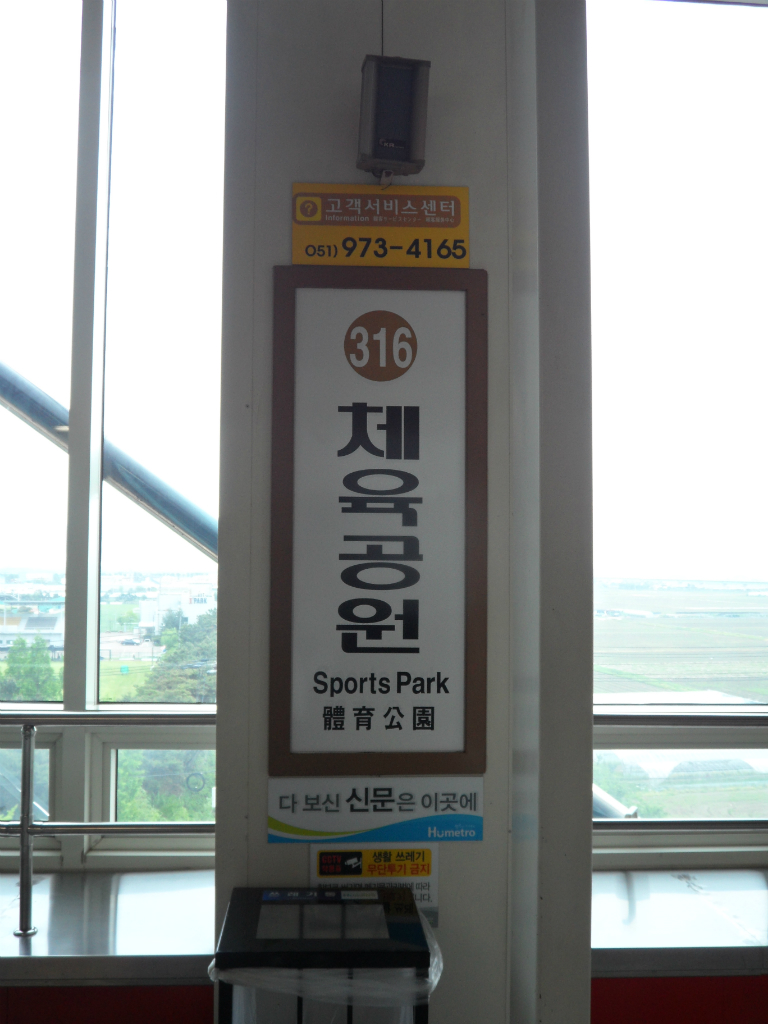

Korean name
- Hangul: 체육공원역
- Hanja: 體育公園驛
- Revised Romanization: Cheyukgongwon-yeok
- McCune–Reischauer: Ch'eyukkongwŏn-yŏk

General information
- Location: Daejeo-dong, Gangseo District, Busan; South Korea
- Coordinates: 35.2125°N 128.9695°E
- Operator: Busan Transportation Corporation
- Line: Busan Metro Line 3
- Platforms: 2
- Tracks: 2

Other information
- Station code: 316

History
- Opened: November 28, 2005
Location

Sports Park Station (Korean: 체육공원역; Hanja: 體育公園驛) is a station of Busan Metro Line 3 in Daejeo-dong, Gangseo District, Busan, South Korea.

Preceding station	Busan Metro	Following station
Gangseo-gu Office towards Suyeong	Line 3	Daejeo Terminus
