= Busan National University of Education station =

Station of the Busan Metro

| 교대; Busan Nat'l Univ. of Edu. |
124
교대
Busan Nat'l Univ. of Edu.
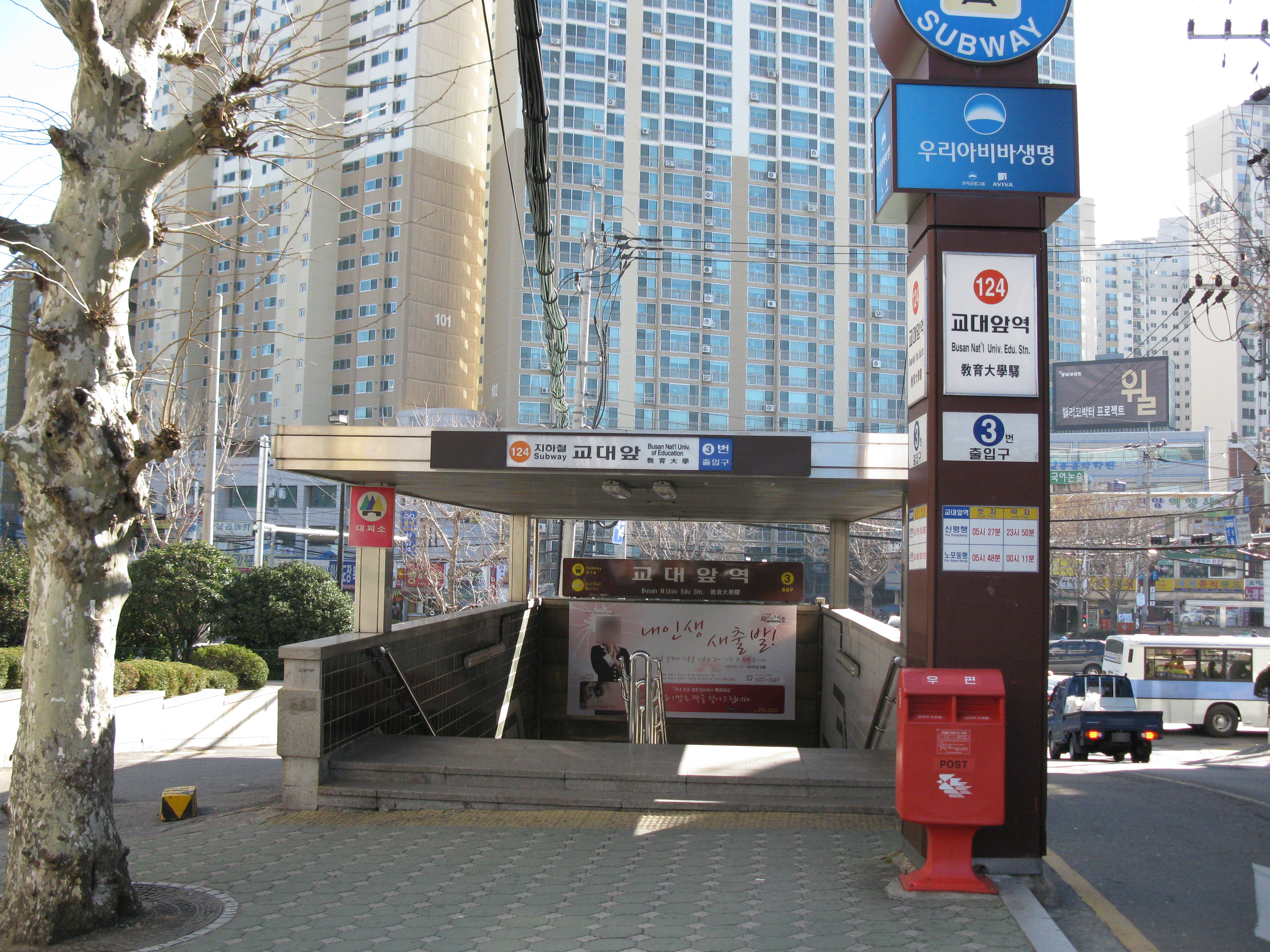
- Line 1 station

Korean name
- Hangul: 교대역
- Hanja: 敎大驛
- Revised Romanization: Gyodae-yeok
- McCune–Reischauer: Kyotae-yŏk

General information
- Location: Geoje-dong, Yeonje District, Busan; South Korea
- Coordinates: 35°11′45″N 129°04′48″E
- Operator: Busan Transportation Corporation; Korail
- Lines: Line 1 Donghae Line
- Platforms: 4
- Tracks: 4

Construction
- Structure type: Underground/Aboveground

Other information
- Station code: 124 (Line 1); K113 (Donghae Line)

History
- Opened: July 19, 1985; 41 years ago

Services
| Preceding station | Busan Metro | Following station |
|---|---|---|
| Yeonsan towards Dadaepo Beach | Line 1 | Dongnae towards Nopo |
| Geoje towards Bujeon | Donghae Line | Dongnae towards Taehwagang |
Location

Busan Nat'l Univ. of Edu. Station (Korean: 교대역; Hanja: 敎大驛) is a station of the Busan Metro Line 1 & Donghae Line in Geoje-dong, Yeonje District, Busan, South Korea.

It was named as such due to its proximity to the Busan National University of Education located on the west side of the station.

== Station Layout ==
=== Line 1 ===
Dongnae ↑
S/B | | N/B
↓ Yeonsan

| Southbound | ← ● Line 1 toward Dadaepo Beach |
| Northbound | ● Line 1 toward Nopo → |

=== Donghae Line ===
↑ Dongnae
N/B | | S/B
Geoje ↓

| Northbound | ● Donghae Line toward Taehwagang → |
| Southbound | ← ● Donghae Line toward Bujeon |

== Gallery ==
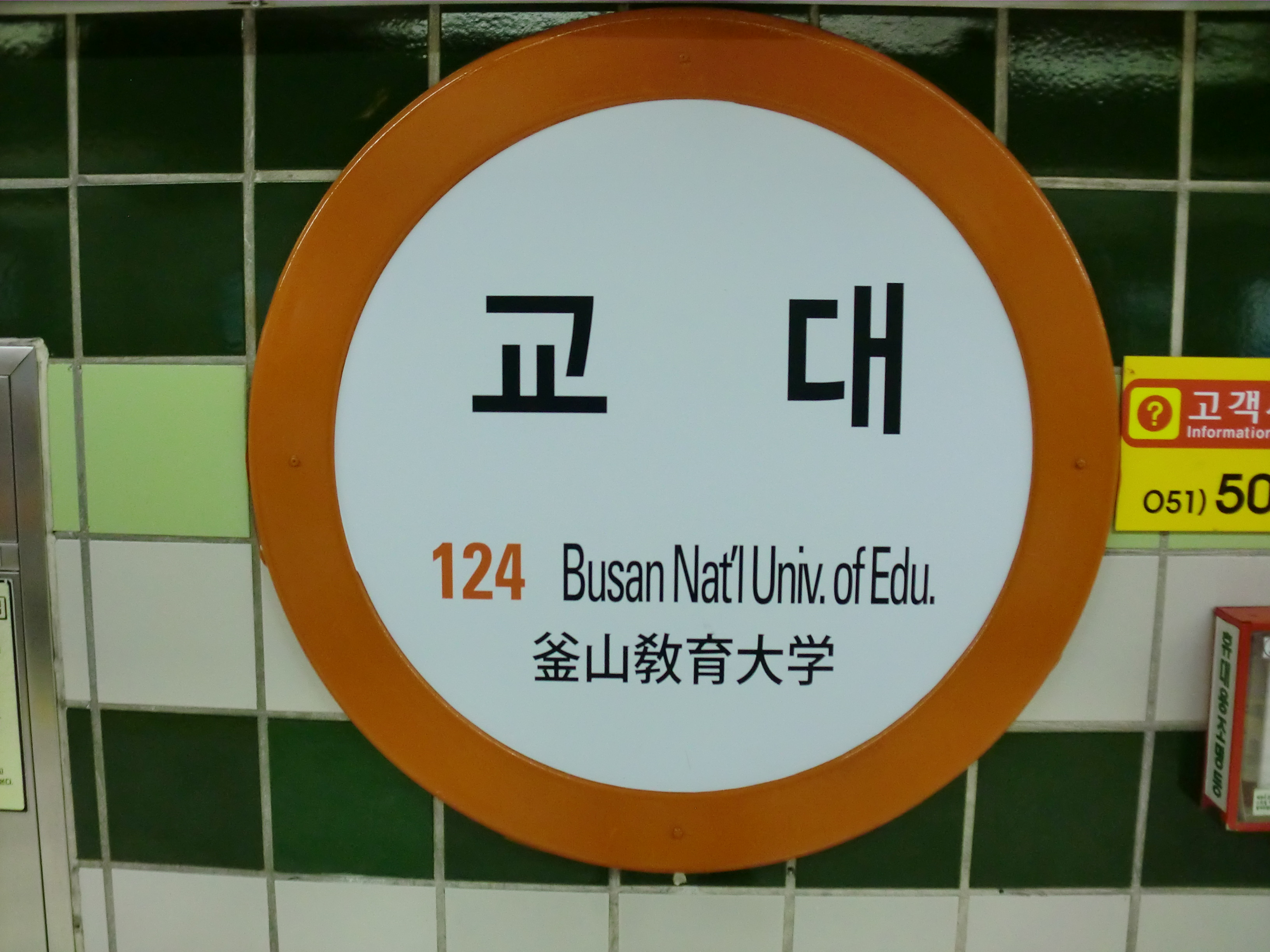
Station Sign (Line 1)

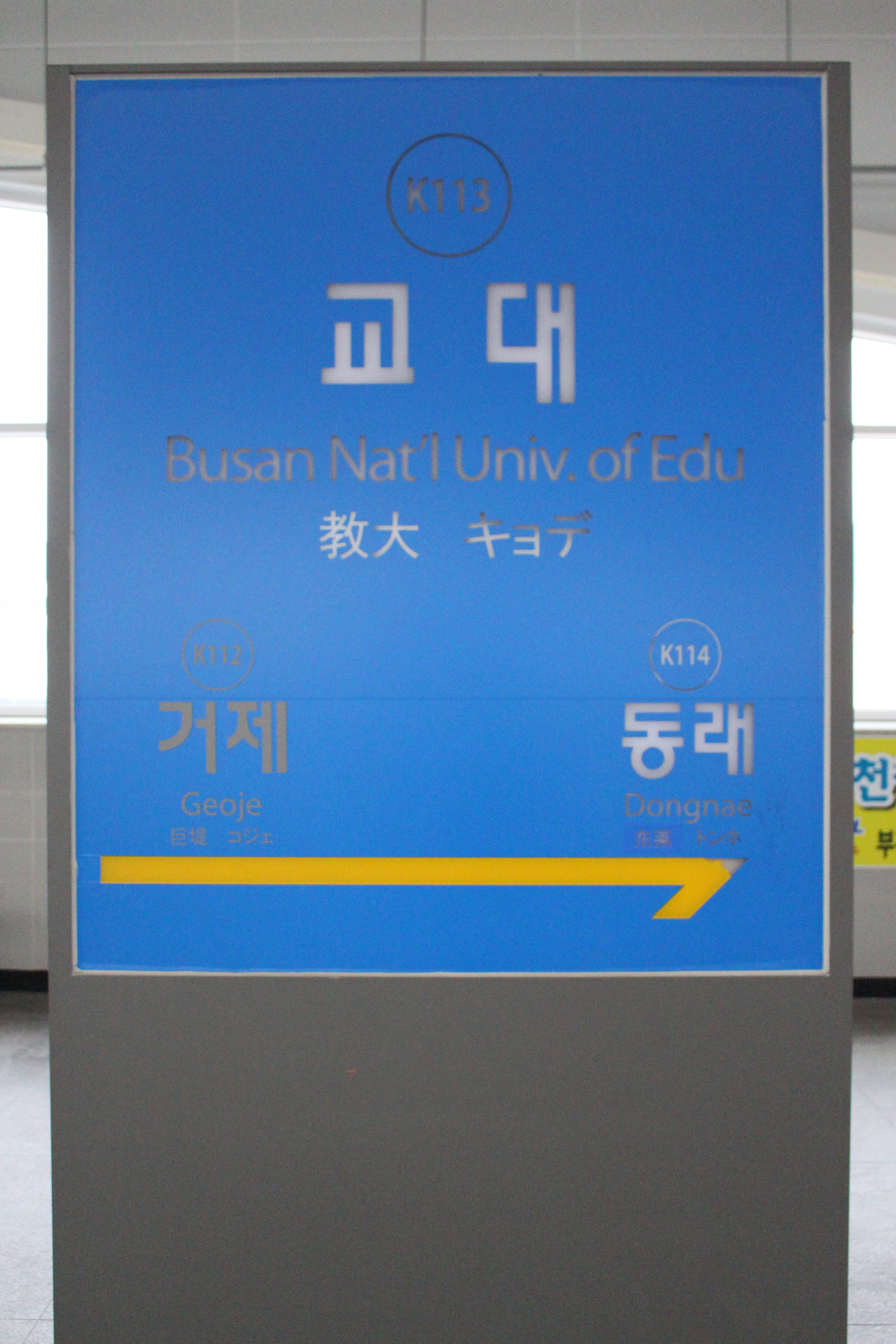
Station Sign (Donghae Line)

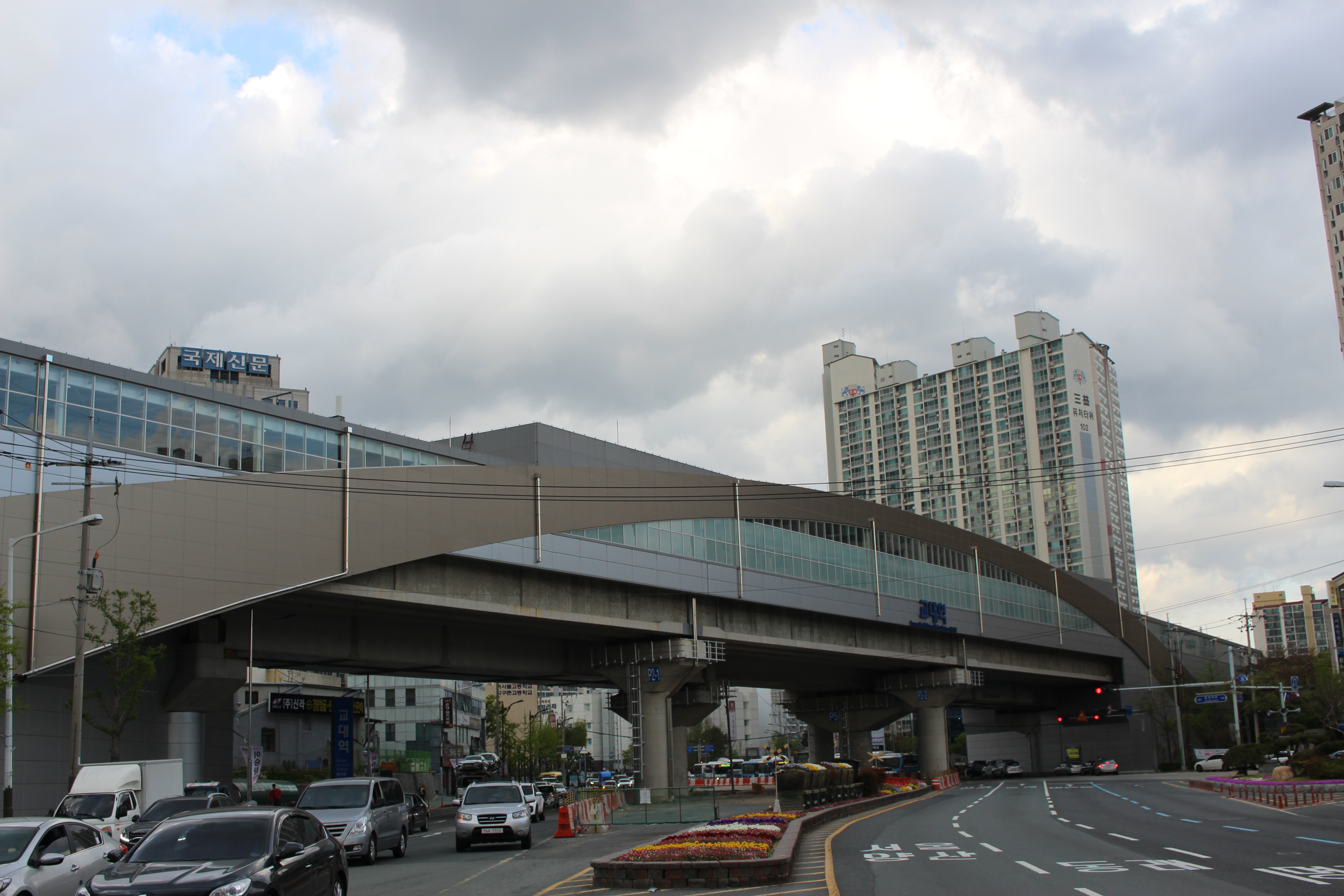
Donghae Line station
