= Gangseo-gu Office station =

Station of the Busan Metro

315 강서구청 Gangseo-gu Office
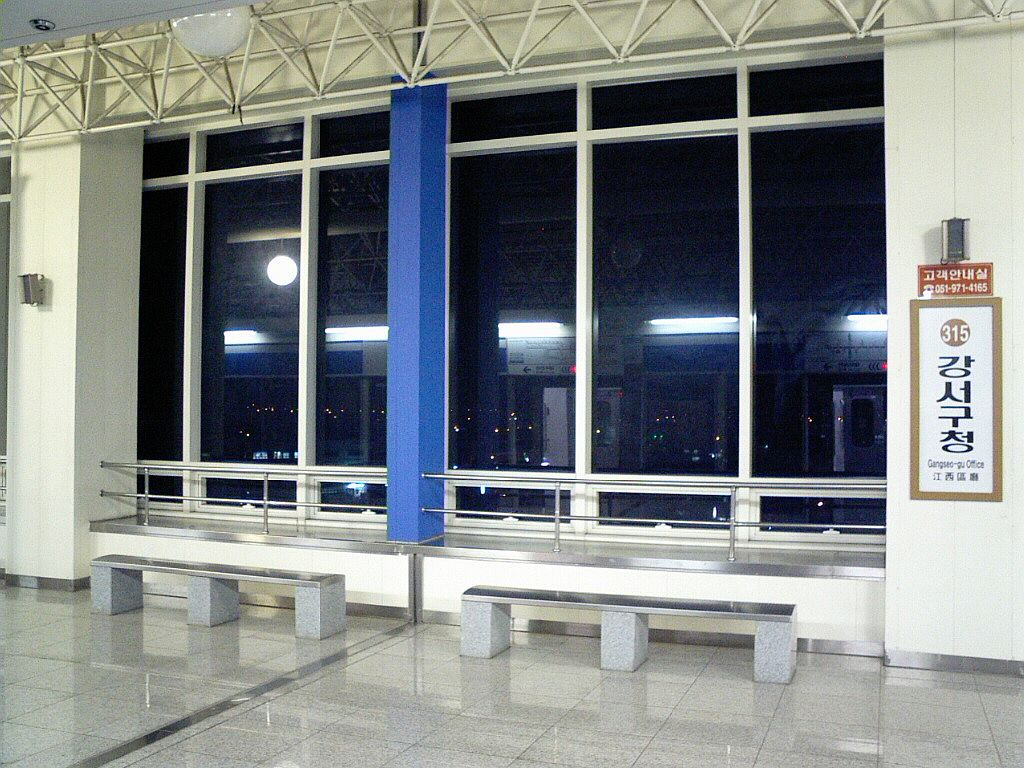

Korean name
- Hangul: 강서구청역
- Hanja: 江西區廳驛
- Revised Romanization: Gangseo-gu Cheong-yeok
- McCune–Reischauer: Kangsŏ-ku Ch'ŏng-yŏk

General information
- Location: Daejeo-dong, Gangseo District, Busan; South Korea
- Coordinates: 35.2112°N 128.9821°E
- Operator: Busan Transportation Corporation
- Line: Busan Metro Line 3
- Platforms: 2
- Tracks: 2

Other information
- Station code: 315

History
- Opened: November 28, 2005

Services
Preceding station	Busan Metro	Following station
Gupo towards Suyeong	Line 3	Sports Park towards Daejeo
Location

Gangseo-gu Office Station (Korean: 강서구청역) is a station of the Busan Metro Line 3 in Daejeo-dong, Gangseo District, Busan, South Korea.
