= Allak station =

Train station in Busan, South Korea

Coordinates: 35.1960°N 129.1040°E

안락; Allak
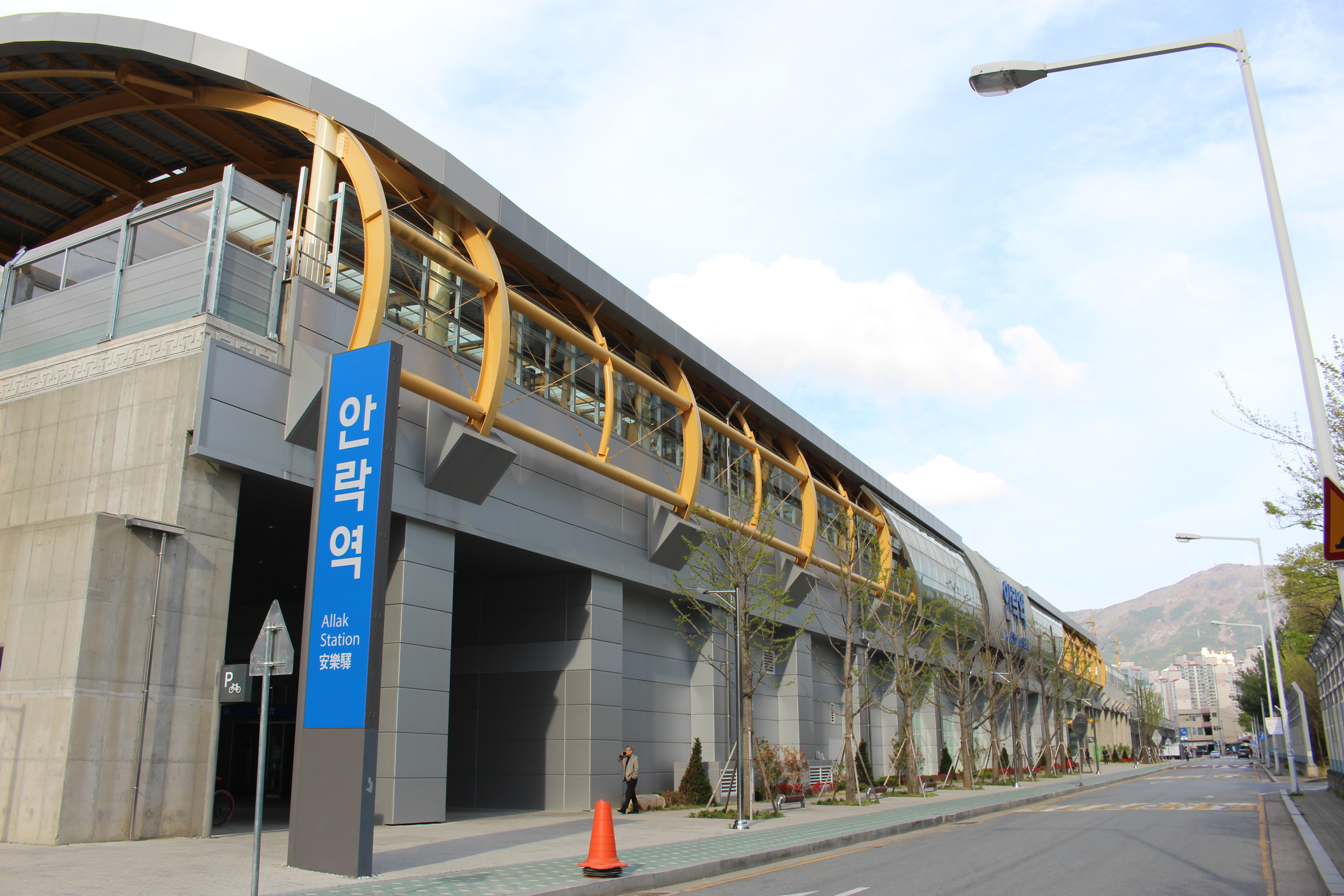

Korean name
- Hangul: 안락역
- Hanja: 安樂驛
- RR: Allak-yeok
- MR: Allak-yŏk

General information
- Location: Allak-dong, Dongnae District, Busan; South Korea
- Operator: Korail
- Line: Donghae Line
- Platforms: 2
- Tracks: 2

Construction
- Structure type: Aboveground

History
- Opened: August 16, 1989

Services
Preceding station	Busan Metro	Following station
Dongnae towards Bujeon	Donghae Line	Busanwondong towards Taehwagang
Location

Allak station (Korean: 안락역; Hanja: 安樂驛) is a railway station of the Donghae Line in Allak-dong, Dongnae District, Busan, South Korea.

== History ==
It started on August 16, 1989, as a temporary platform. In 2008, it stopped handling passengers. In 2016, it became a part of the Busan Metro Donghae Line and was promoted to a non-placement simple station by opening a wide area railway.

== Station layout ==
L2; Platforms	Side platform, doors will open on the right
L2; Platforms	Northbound	Donghae toward Taehwagang (Busanwondong)→
L2; Platforms	Southbound	← Donghae toward Bujeon (Dongnae)
L2; Platforms	Side platform, doors will open on the right

L1; Concourse	Lobby	Customer service, shops, vending machines, ATMs

G	Street level	Exit
