= Gupo Station =

Gupo Station (Korean: 구포역) is the name of several railroad stations in South Korea.

- Gupo station, a Korail station
- Gupo station (Busan Metro)
