= Busan Metro Line 3 =

Subway line in Busan, South Korea

Line 3
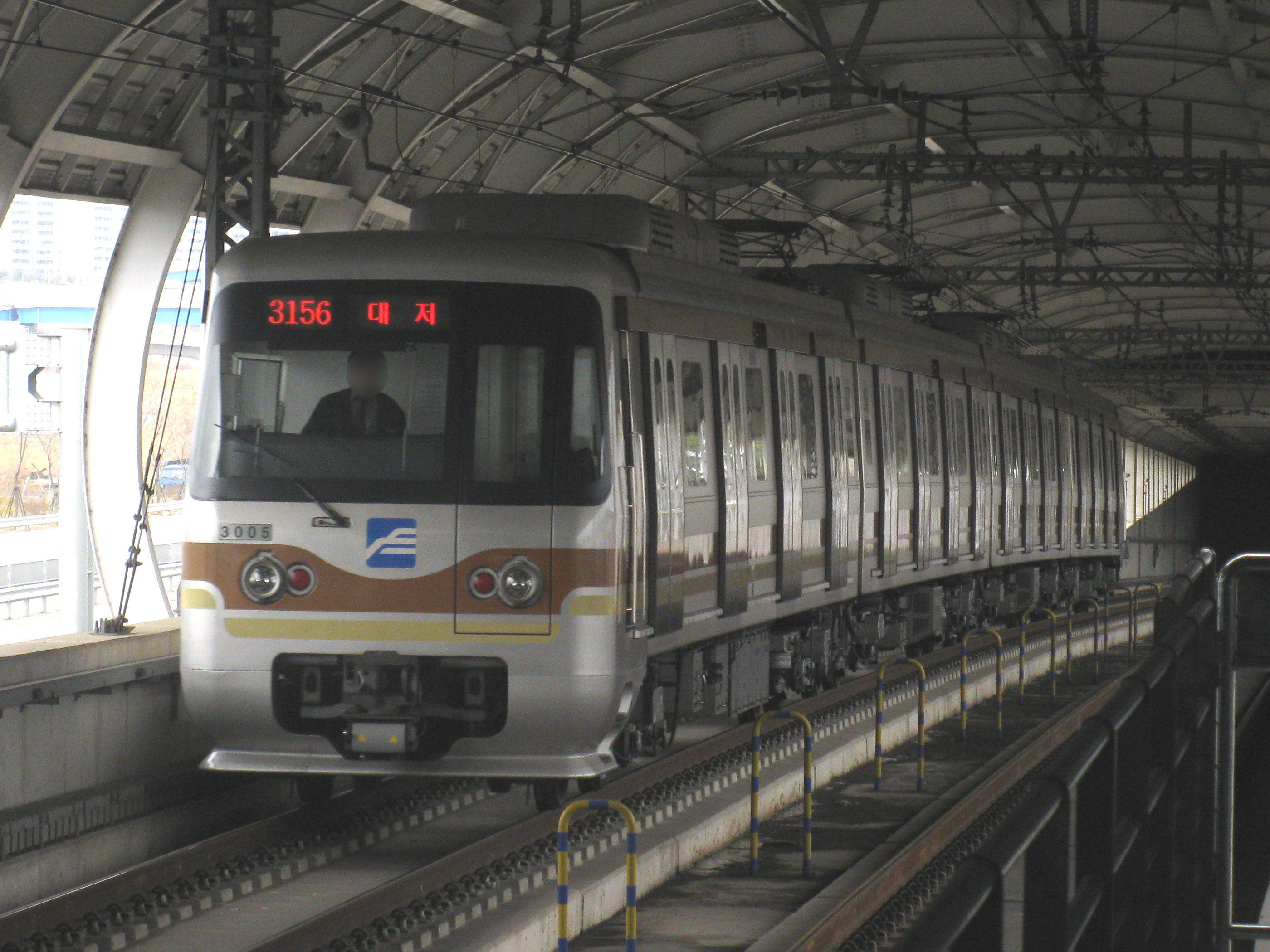

Overview
- Native name: 3호선(3號線); Sam Hoseon
- Status: Operational
- Owner: Busan Metropolitan City
- Termini: Suyeong; Daejeo
- Stations: 17

Service
- Type: Rapid transit
- System: Busan Metro
- Services: 1
- Operator: Busan Transportation Corporation
- Rolling stock: Rotem BTC Class 3000

History
- Opened: 28 November 2005; 20 years ago

Technical
- Line length: 18.4 km (11.4 mi)
- Track length: 18.6 km (11.6 mi)
- Number of tracks: 2
- Track gauge: 1,435 mm (4 ft 8 1/2 in) standard gauge
- Electrification: Overhead wire, machined rigid body wire, 1,500 V DC

Busan Metro Line 3 (3호선) is a line of the Busan Metro system. It was built from 1997 to 2005 and opened on November 28, 2005. The line is 18.3 kilometers (11.4 mi) long, and has 17 stations, and its main colour is brown. Each train of the line has 4 cars. Line 3's trains have an open gangway between each car (just like Line 4), giving an unblocked view of the whole train from one end to the other. The line was originally planned to have a main line from Suyeong station to Daejeo station with a second phase that splits from Minam Station. However, the second phase split into a separate line and is now called Line 4.

Line 3's station signs use a similar design to those Line 2, with the station name written in Hangul at the top in big letters and English and Hanja near the bottom in small font. However, Line 3's station signs have different colours for their border and arms, with the top half being brown and the bottom half being grey. The arms also have differing designs for their respective neighboring stations, with the arm pointing to the next station having a tipped end and the arm pointing to the preceding station having a concave indent; the Hangul name is printed in the brown half while the grey half houses the English and Hanja names. The current station's number is also printed close to the top, above the Hangul name. Some stations, like Suyeong, however, have shifted to putting the number next to the English name with a solid brown colour for both the arms and frame, keeping the same end designs while putting the English and Hanja names next to the Hangul name, closer to the sign's main body.

Due to the Daegu Subway Fire in 2003, all of Line 3's stations were built with platform screen doors. Line 3 was one of the first metro lines in both Korea and the world to have platform screen doors equipped at every station.

Line 3 greatly increased the efficiency of the entire Busan Metro system. While Line 2 connects the Deokcheon region to the Suyeong region in a rather curved, 'southernly' way, Line 3 connects the two areas in a more straight line. For example, a person living in the Yangsan area would not use the whole line 2 to reach the Haeundae area; instead, he or she would transfer at Deokcheon Station to Line 3, and transfer back to Line 2 at Suyeong Station. Line 3 also increased the efficiency of traveling between Deokcheon and Yeonsandong area, along with the Minam and Dongnae area.

A ride through the entire line takes about 34 minutes.

== List of stations ==
All stations are in Busan.

Station Number	Station name English	Station name Hangul	Station name Hanja	Transfer	Distance in km	Total distance	Location
301	Suyeong	수영	水營	Busan Metro Line 2	---	0.0	Suyeong
302	Mangmi	망미 (병무청)	望美		1.0	1.0	Suyeong
303	Baesan	배산	盃山		1.2	2.2	Yeonje
304	Mulmangol	물만골	물만골		1.1	3.3	Yeonje
305	Yeonsan	연산	蓮山	Busan Metro Line 1	1.1	4.4	Yeonje
306	Geoje	거제	巨堤	Donghae Line	0.7	5.1	Yeonje
307	Sports Complex	종합운동장 (빅토리움)	綜合運動場		0.7	5.8	Yeonje
308	Sajik	사직	社稷		0.8	6.6	Dongnae
309	Minam	미남	美南	Busan Metro Line 4	0.8	7.4	Dongnae
310	Mandeok	만덕	萬德		3.3	10.7	Buk
311	Namsanjeong	남산정 (부산폴리텍대학)	南山亭		1.1	11.8	Buk
312	Sukdeung	숙등 (부민병원)	淑嶝		1.0	12.8	Buk
313	Deokcheon	덕천 (부산과기대)	德川	Busan Metro Line 2	0.7	13.5	Buk
314	Gupo	구포	龜浦	Gyeongbu High Speed Railway ITX-Saemaeul services Mugunghwa-ho services	1.1	14.6	Buk
315	Gangseo-gu Office	강서구청	江西區廳		1.6	16.2	Gangseo
316	Sports Park	체육공원	體育公園		1.1	17.3	Gangseo
317	Daejeo	대저	大渚	Busan–Gimhae Light Rail Transit	0.8	18.1	Gangseo
