= Mangmi station =

Station of the Busan Metro

302 망미 (병무청) Mangmi (Military Manpower Administration)
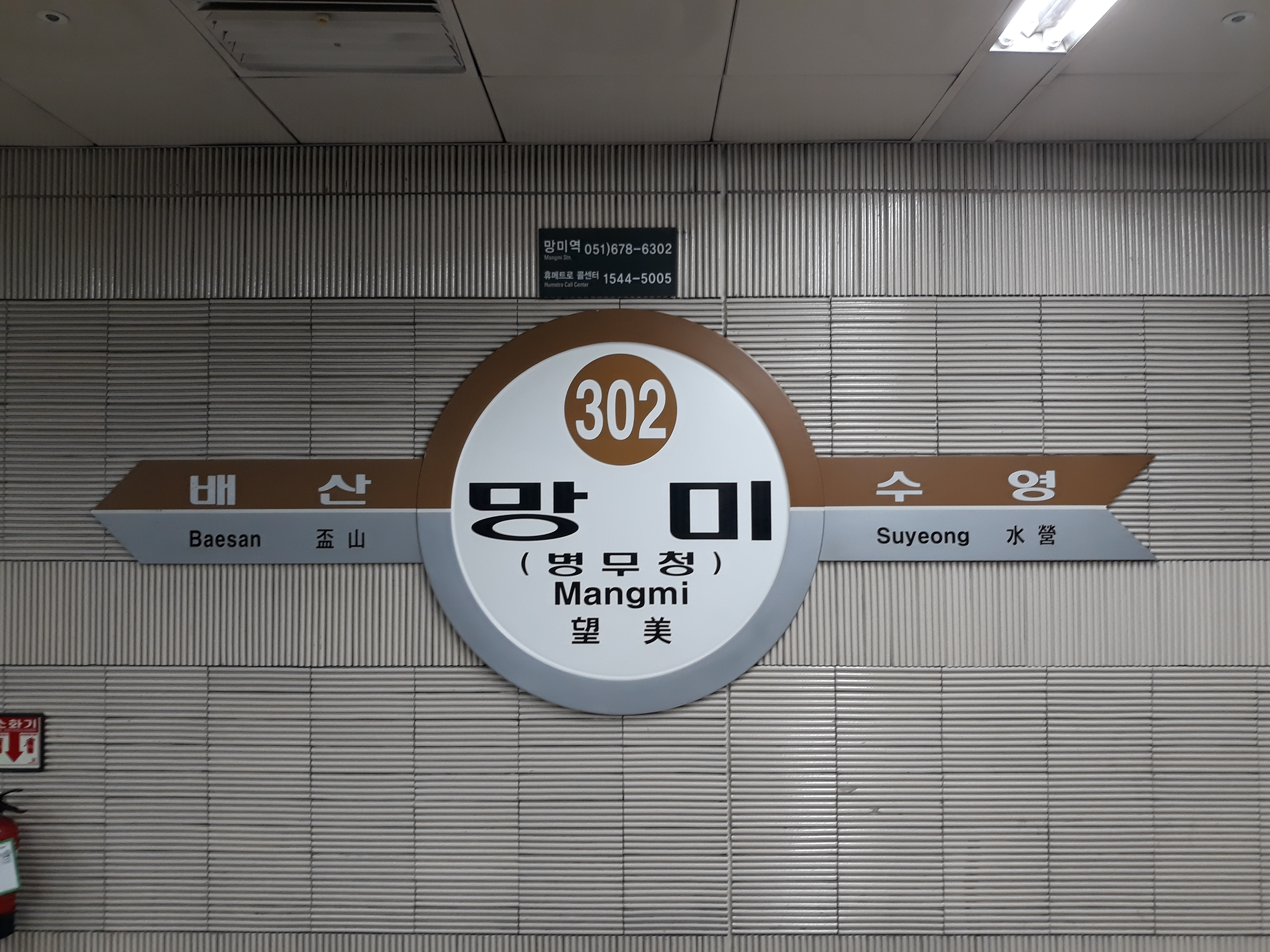

Korean name
- Hangul: 망미역
- Hanja: 望美驛
- Revised Romanization: Mangmi yeok
- McCune–Reischauer: Mangmi yŏk

General information
- Location: Mangmi-dong, Suyeong District, Busan; South Korea
- Coordinates: 35.1718°N 129.1074°E
- Operator: Busan Transportation Corporation
- Line: Busan Metro Line 3
- Platforms: 2
- Tracks: 2

Construction
- Structure type: Underground

Other information
- Station code: 302

History
- Opened: November 28, 2005

Services
Preceding station	Busan Metro	Following station
Suyeong Terminus	Line 3	Baesan towards Daejeo
Location

Mangmi Station (Korean: 망미역; Hanja: 望美驛) is a station of Busan Metro Line 3 in Mangmi-dong, Suyeong District, Busan, South Korea.
