= Gupo station (Busan Metro) =

Station of the Busan Metro

314 구포 Gupo
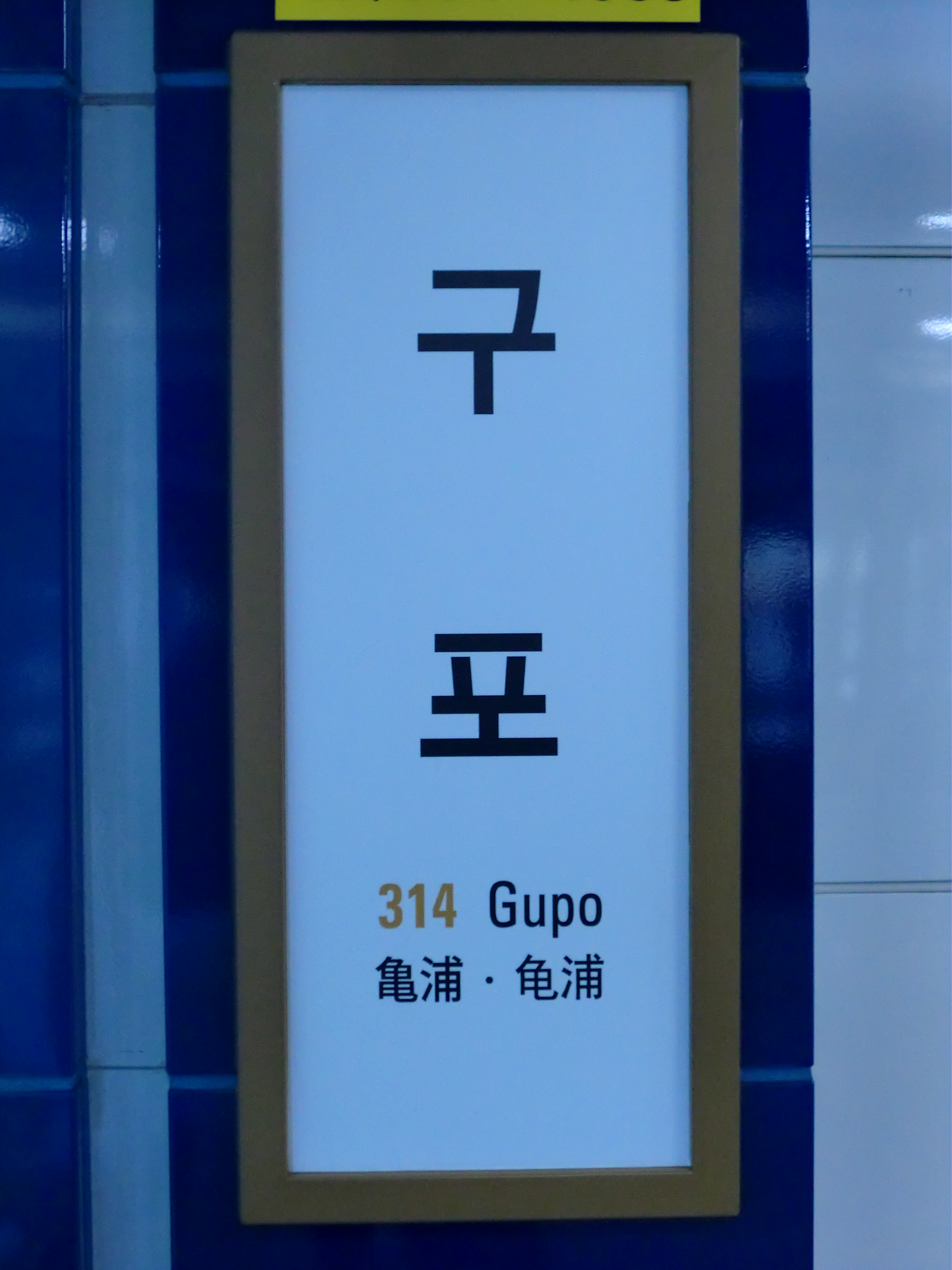

General information
- Coordinates: 35.206706°N 128.996333°E
- Operator: Busan Transportation Corporation
- Line: Busan Metro Line 3
- Platforms: 2
- Tracks: 2

Construction
- Structure type: Elevated

Other information
- Station code: 314

History
- Opened: November 28, 2005

Services
Preceding station	Busan Metro	Following station
Deokcheon towards Suyeong	Line 3	Gangseo-gu Office towards Daejeo
Location

Gupo Station (Korean: 구포역; Hanja: 龜浦驛) is a station of the Busan Metro Line 3 in Gupo-dong, Buk District, Busan, South Korea.
