= Dongnae station (Korail) =

Metro station in Busan, South Korea

Coordinates: 35.1976°N 129.0900°E

동래; Dongnae
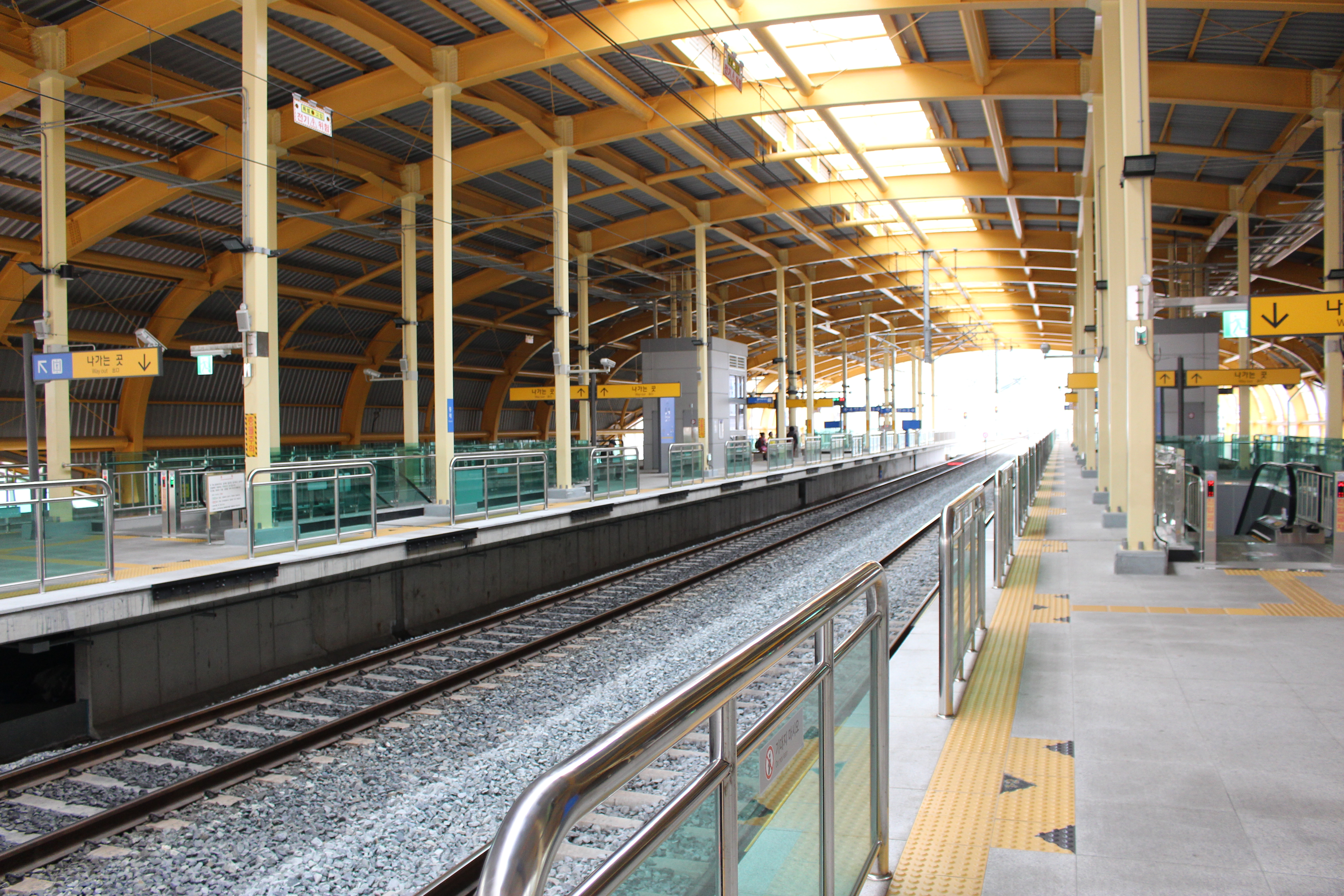

Korean name
- Hangul: 동래역
- Hanja: 東萊驛
- Revised Romanization: Dongnae-yeok
- McCune–Reischauer: Tongnae-yŏk

General information
- Location: Nangmin-dong, Dongnae District, Busan; South Korea
- Operator: Korail
- Line: Donghae Line
- Platforms: 2
- Tracks: 4

Construction
- Structure type: Aboveground

History
- Opened: July 15, 1934
- Rebuilt: December 30, 2016

Services
Preceding station	Busan Metro	Following station
Busan National University of Education towards Bujeon	Donghae Line	Allak towards Taehwagang
Location

Dongnae station (Korean: 동래역) is a railway station of the Donghae Line in Nangmin-dong, Dongnae District, Busan, South Korea. The station is unrelated to the Dongnae Station of Busan Metro.

It is in close proximity to Nangmin Station on Line 4.

The original station was built during Japanese occupation and operated until 2016, when it was replaced by the current station. The original station is preserved adjacent to the elevated platform of the new station.

== Station layout ==
L2; Platforms	Side platform, doors will open on the right
L2; Platforms	Northbound	Donghae toward Taehwagang (Allak)→
L2; Platforms	Southbound	← Donghae toward Bujeon (Busan Nat'l Univ. of Edu.)
L2; Platforms	Side platform, doors will open on the right

L1; Concourse	Lobby	Customer service, shops, vending machines, ATMs

G	Street level	Exit
