= Yangjeong station (Busan Metro) =

Station of the Busan Metro

121 양정 ((주)소셜빈) Yangjeong (Social Bean Co., Ltd.)
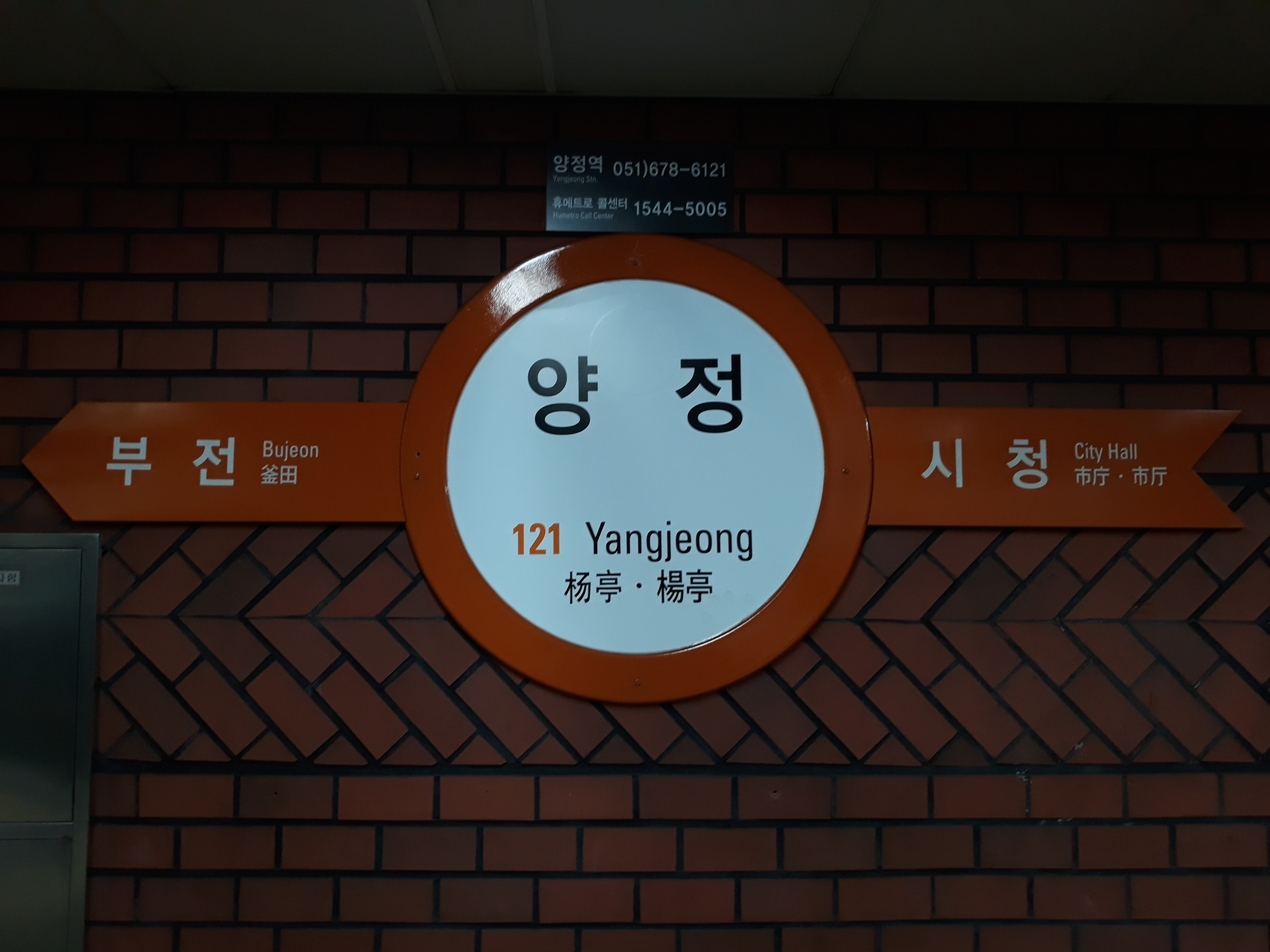

Korean name
- Hangul: 양정역
- Hanja: 楊亭驛
- Revised Romanization: Yangjeongnyeok
- McCune–Reischauer: Yangjŏngnyŏk

General information
- Location: Yangjeong-dong, Busanjin District, Busan; South Korea
- Coordinates: 35°10′23″N 129°04′16″E
- Operator: Busan Transportation Corporation
- Line: Line 1
- Platforms: 2
- Tracks: 2

Construction
- Structure type: Underground

Other information
- Station code: 121

History
- Opened: July 19, 1985; 41 years ago

Services
Preceding station	Busan Metro	Following station
Bujeon towards Dadaepo Beach	Line 1	City Hall towards Nopo
Location

Yangjeong Station is a station of Busan Metro Line 1 in Yangjeong-dong, Busanjin District, Busan, South Korea.

== Station Layout ==
G	Street level	Exit

L1; Concourse	Lobby	Customer Service, Shops, Vending machines, ATMs

L2; Platforms	Side platform, doors will open on the right
L2; Platforms	Southbound	← Line 1 toward Dadaepo Beach (Bujeon)
L2; Platforms	Northbound	Line 1 toward Nopo (City Hall)→
L2; Platforms	Side platform, doors will open on the right
