= Bujeon station (Busan Metro) =

Station of the Busan Metro

120 부전 (부산시민공원·송상현광장) Bujeon (Busan Citizens Park·Song Sang-hyeon Square)
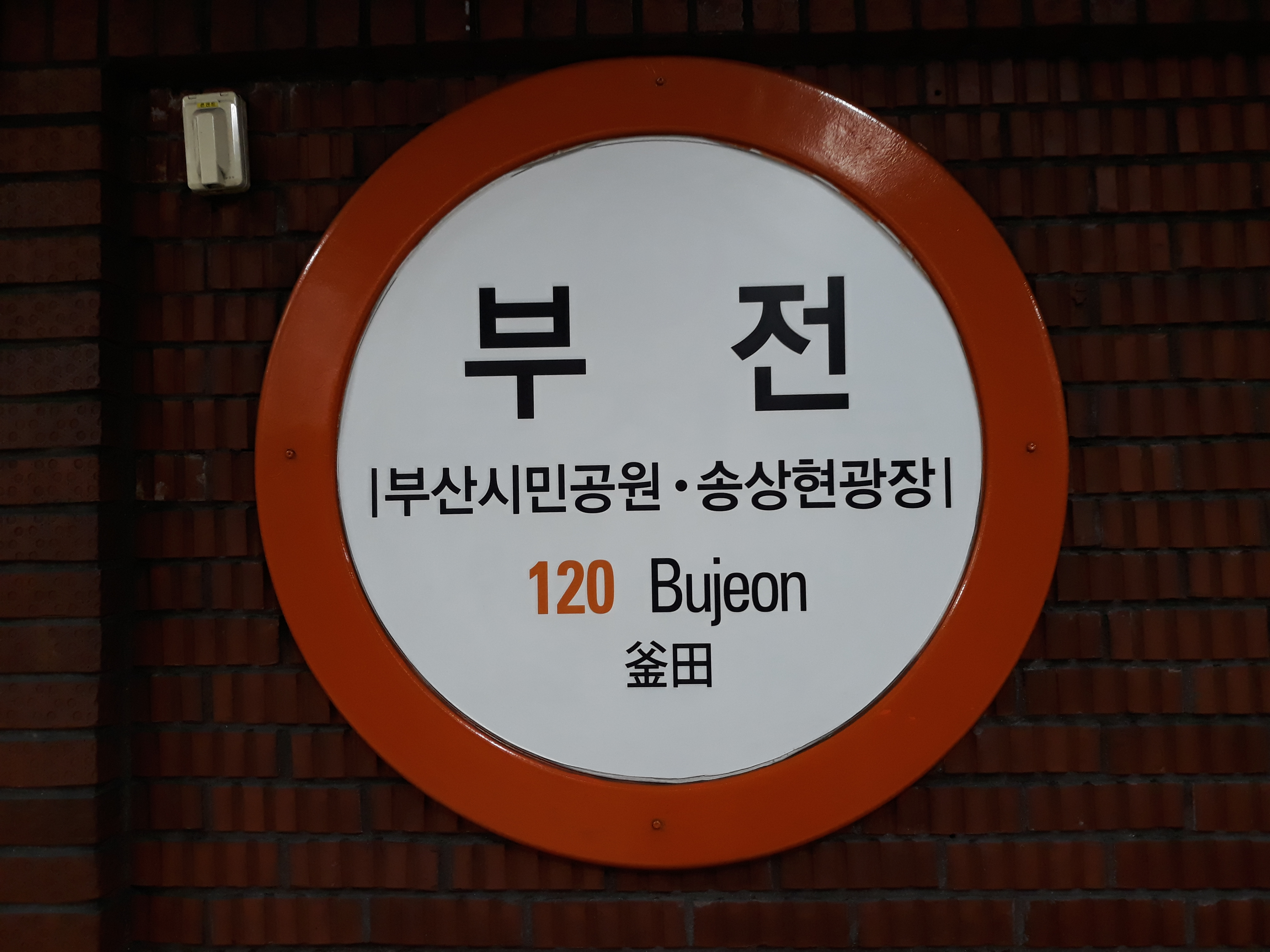

Korean name
- Hangul: 부전역
- Hanja: 釜田驛
- Revised Romanization: Bujeonnyeok
- McCune–Reischauer: Pujŏnnyŏk

General information
- Location: Bujeon-dong, Busanjin District, Busan; South Korea
- Coordinates: 35.162378°N 129.062855°E
- Operator: Busan Transportation Corporation
- Line: Line 1
- Platforms: 2
- Tracks: 2
- Connections: Bus Stop

Construction
- Structure type: Underground

Other information
- Station code: 120

History
- Opened: July 19, 1985; 41 years ago

Services
| Preceding station | Busan Metro | Following station |
|---|---|---|
| Seomyeon towards Dadaepo Beach | Line 1 | Yangjeong towards Nopo |
Location

Bujeon Station (Korean: 부전역; Hanja: 釜田驛) is a station of the Busan Metro Line 1 in Bujeon-dong, Busanjin District, Busan, South Korea. The station is unrelated to the Bujeon Station of Korail.

== Station Layout ==
| G | Street level | Exit |

| L1; Concourse | Lobby | Customer Service, Shops, Vending machines, ATMs |

| L2; Platforms | Side platform, doors will open on the right |
| L2; Platforms | Southbound | ← Line 1 toward Dadaepo Beach (Seomyeon) |
| L2; Platforms | Northbound | Line 1 toward Nopo (Yangjeong)→ |
| L2; Platforms | Side platform, doors will open on the right |

== Vicinity ==
- Exit 1: Yeongjamyeonok Bujeon Branch
- Exit 2: EDIYA Coffee Busan Jeonpo
- Exit 3: Jageumseong, Bujeon Building Materials
- Exit 4: Compose Coffee Bujeon Station
- Exit 5: Songha Restaurant, Heung-a Electronic Shopping Center
- Exit 6: National Health Insurance Corporation, Busan Plus Hair Center Wig Story
- Exit 7: Busan Metropolitan City Vehicle Registration Office Bujeon Station Field Complaint Center
- Exit 8: Ten percent
