= Suyeong station =

Station of the Busan Metro

208 301 수영 Suyeong
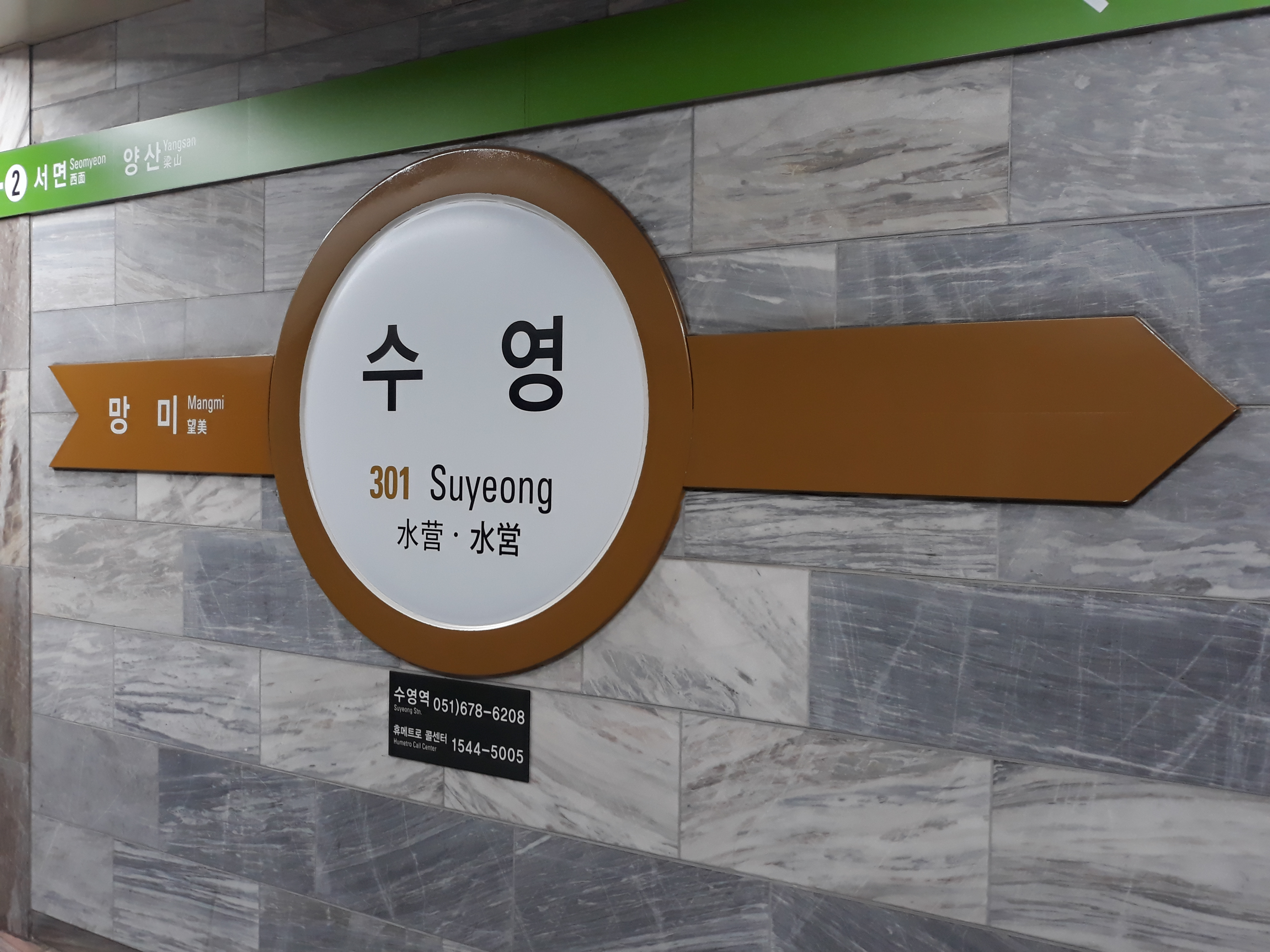
- Station Sign (Line 3)

Korean name
- Hangul: 수영역
- Hanja: 水營驛
- Revised Romanization: Suyeongnyeok
- McCune–Reischauer: Suyŏngnyŏk

General information
- Location: U-dong, Suyeong District, Busan; South Korea
- Coordinates: 35°10′02.45″N 129°6′54.45″E
- Operator: Busan Transportation Corporation
- Lines: Line 2 Line 3
- Platforms: 1
- Tracks: 2

Construction
- Structure type: Underground
- Accessible: yes

Other information
- Station code: ● Line 2: 208 ● Line 3: 301

History
- Opened: ● Line 2: August 29, 2002; 24 years ago ● Line 3: November 28, 2005; 20 years ago
- Former names: Jwasuyeong (before opening)

Services
Preceding station	Busan Metro	Following station
Millak towards Jangsan	Line 2	Gwangan towards Yangsan
Terminus	Line 3	Mangmi towards Daejeo
Location

Suyeong Station is a station on the Busan Metro Line 2 and Line 3 located in U-dong, Suyeong District, Busan. The station is unrelated to the Centum station operated by Korail.

== Gallery ==
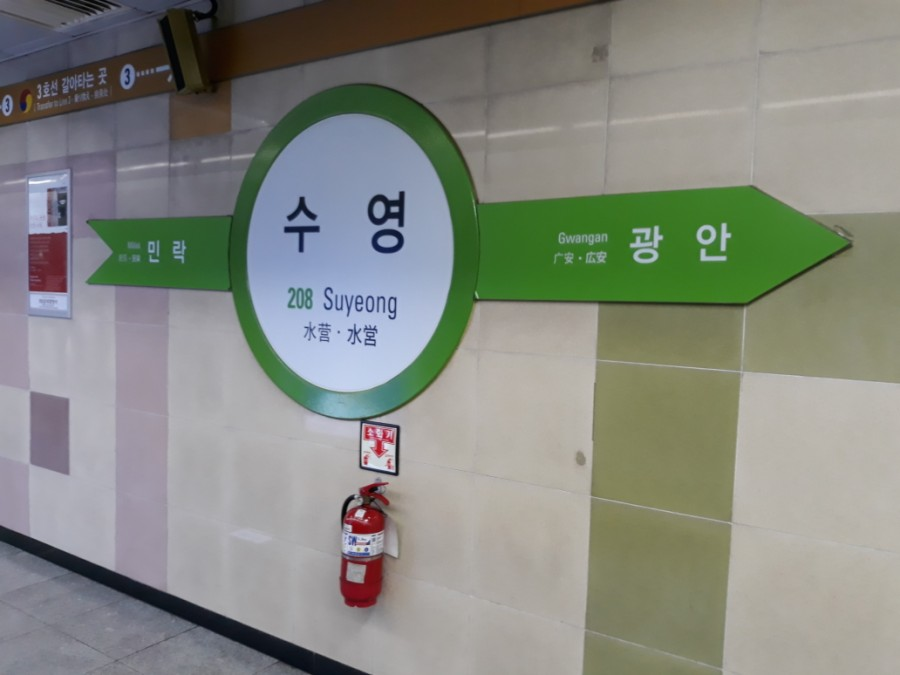
Station Sign (Line 2)
