= Yeonje District =

District of Busan, South Korea

Coordinates: 35°10′32″N 129°04′46″E

Yeonje
- Autonomous District
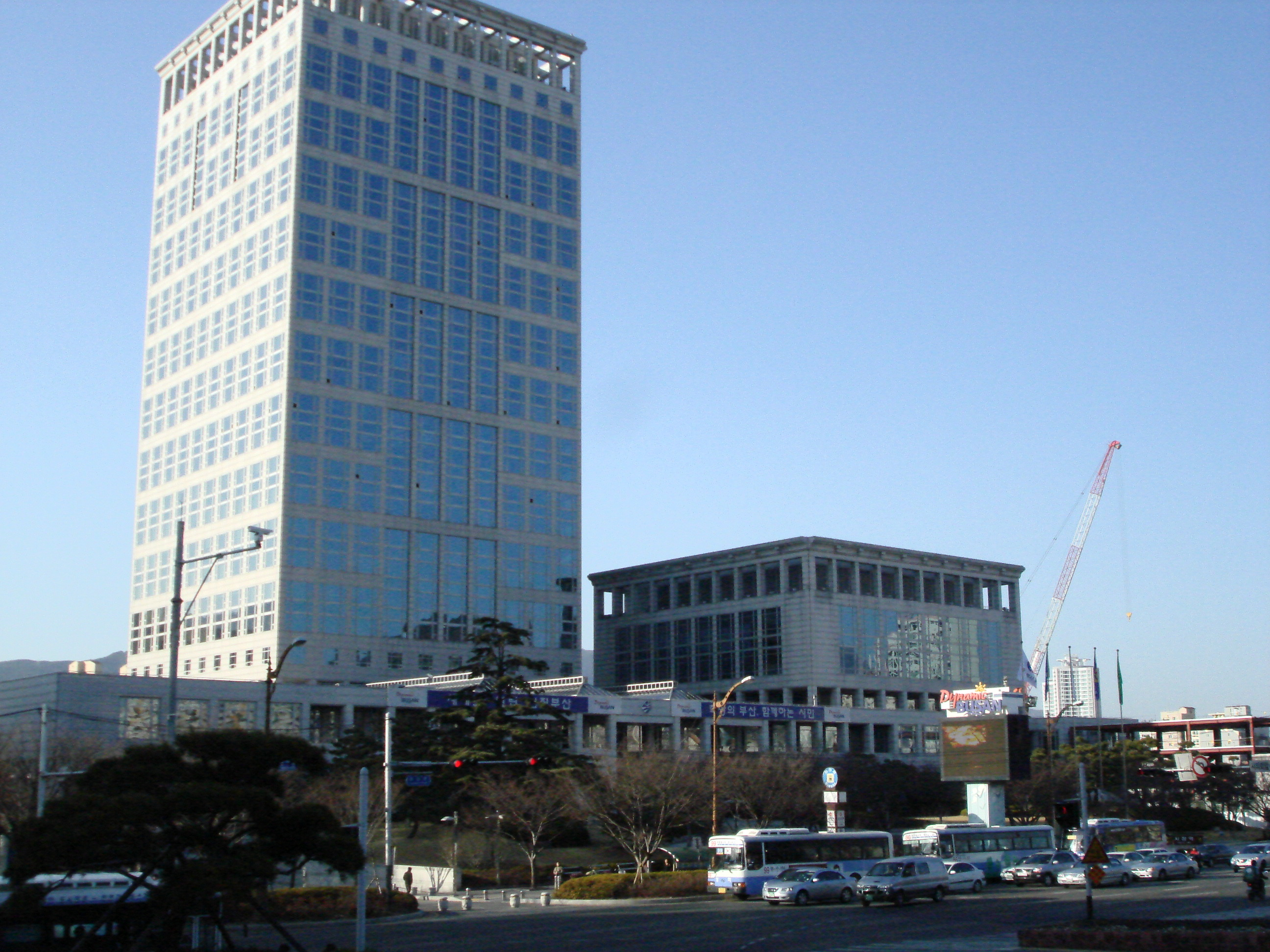
- Busan City Hall

- Flag

- Country: South Korea
- Region: Yeongnam
- Provincial level: Busan
- Administrative divisions: 13 administrative dong

Government
  - Mayor: Ju Seok-su (주석수)

Area
  - Total: 12.08 km^{2} (4.66 sq mi)

Population (2024)
  - Total: 212,400
  - Density: 17,580/km^{2} (45,540/sq mi)
  - Dialect: Gyeongsang
- Website: Yeonje District Office

Korean name
- Hangul: 연제구
- Hanja: 蓮堤區
- RR: Yeonje-gu
- MR: Yŏnje-gu

Yeonje District (Korean: 연제구) is a gu in central Busan, South Korea. It has an area of 12.08 km^{2}, and a population of about 220,000. Yeonje District was created in March 1995 following its separation from Dongnae District. Its name was formed by taking the first and last syllables of the names of its only 2 legal dong; Yeonsan-dong and Geoje-dong. Busan City Hall is located in Yeonje District.

== Administrative divisions ==
Administrative divisions

Yeonje District is divided into 2 legal dong, which all together comprise 12 administrative dong, as follows:

- Yeonsan-dong (8 administrative dong)
- Geoje-dong (4 administrative dong)

== See also ==
- Geography of South Korea
- Subdivisions of South Korea
