= Fuyang (disambiguation) =

Fuyang may refer to these places in China:

- Fuyang (阜阳), a prefecture-level city in Anhui
- Fuyang District (富阳区), a district of Hangzhou, Zhejiang

== Towns ==
- Fuyang, Guangdong (浮洋), in Chaozhou, Guangdong
- Fuyang, Guizhou (涪洋), in Wuchuan Gelao and Miao Autonomous County, Guizhou
- Fuyang, Sichuan (涪阳), in Tongjiang County, Sichuan
