= 江東區 =

江东区; 江東區;江東区, meaning "district in the east of the river", may refer to:

- Gangdong District, Seoul, South Korea
- Jiangdong District, Ningbo, Zhejiang, China
- Kōtō-ku, Tokyo Metropolis, Japan

== See also ==
- Gangdong (disambiguation)
- Jiangdong (disambiguation)
- Koto (disambiguation)
- 江南区 (disambiguation)
