= 江南区 =

江南区; 江南區, meaning "district in the south of the river", may refer to:

- Gangnam District, Seoul, South Korea
- Jiangnan District, Nanning, Guangxi Zhuang Autonomous Region, China
- Kōnan-ku, Niigata, Japan

== See also ==
- Gangnam (disambiguation)
- Jiangnan (disambiguation)
- Konan (disambiguation)
- 江東區 (disambiguation)
- 江南 (disambiguation)
