= Dongbaek station =

Dongbaek station (Korean: 동백역) is a railroad station in South Korea.

- Dongbaek station (Busan Metro)
- Dongbaek station (Yongin)
