= 江南 =

江南 (Hanyu Pinyin: Jiāngnán; Japanese pronunciation: Kōnan; Korean: 강남; romaja: Gangnam; lit. 'south of the river') may refer to:

== Places ==
- Jiangnan, a geographic area in China immediately south of the lower reaches of the Yangtze River
- Jiangnan District, Nanning, Guangxi, China
- Jiangnan Subdistrict, Meizhou, Guangdong, China
- Jiangnan, Linxiang (江南镇), a township-level division of Linxiang, Hunan, China
- Kōnan, Aichi, Japan
- Kōnan, Saitama, Japan
- Kōnan-ku, Niigata, Niigata, Japan
- Gangnam, an affluent region of Seoul, South Korea
  - Gangnam District, an administrative district located within the Greater Gangnam Area
- Kangnam County, a county in Pyongyang, North Korea
- Kangnam Mountains, a mountain range in North Korea

== People ==
- Henry Liu (1932–1984), Taiwanese writer and journalist with the pen name Jiang Nan
- Jiang Nan (novelist) (born 1977), Chinese novelist

== Stations ==
- Gangnam station, a station of Seoul Subway Line 2 in Seoul
- Gangnam-gu Office station, a subway station of Seoul Subway Line 7
- Kangnam University station, a station of Everline, in Yongin, Gyeonggi Province, South Korea

== Other uses ==
- Jiangnan Daying, a 19th-century army group established by the Qing Dynasty
- Jiangnan Shipyard, a shipyard in Shanghai, China
- Jiangnan University, a university in Wuxi, Jiangsu, China
- Kangnam (singer) (born 1987), a member of the South Korean hip hop group M.I.B.
- Kangnam University, a university in Yongin, Gyeonggi Province, South Korea
- Gangnam-daero, an urban expressway in Seoul, South Korea

== See also ==
- Konan (disambiguation) for homophonous places in Japan
- 江南区 (disambiguation) for homophonous places in Asia
