= Jiangdong =

Jiāngdōng (江东) may refer to the following in China:

- Jiangnan, or Jiangdong, south of the lower reaches of the Yangtze River
- Jiangnan East Circuit, a circuit of the Song dynasty that was split from Jiangnan Circuit
- Jiangdong District, Ningbo, Zhejiang, now part of Yinzhou District
- Jiangdong, Chao'an County, town in Chao'an County, Guangdong
- Jiangdong, Jinhua, town in Jindong District, Jinhua, Zhejiang
- Jiangdong Subdistrict, Chongqing, in Fuling District, Chongqing
- Jiangdong Subdistrict, Nanjing, in Gulou District, Nanjing, Jiangsu
- Jiangdong Subdistrict, Yiwu, in Yiwu, Zhejiang
- Jiangdong, Lanshan County (浆洞瑶族乡), a Yao ethnic township of Lanshan County, Hunan.
- Jiangdong, Hengshan (江东乡), a town of Hengshan County, Hunan.
