= Minle station =

Minle station can refer to:

- Minle station (Chengdu Metro), a metro station in Chengdu, Sichuan, China
- Minle station (Shenzhen Metro), a metro station in Shenzhen, Guangdong, China
- Minle railway station, a railway station in Minle County, Zhangye, Gansu, China

== See also ==
- Millak station, a metro station in Busan, South Korea
