= Wuchuan =

Wuchuan (Wuchwan) may refer to three county-level divisions of the People's Republic of China:

- Wuchuan, Guangdong (吴川市), Zhanjiang, Guangdong
- Wuchuan County, Inner Mongolia (武川县), Hohhot, Inner Mongolia
- Wuchuan Gelao and Miao Autonomous County (务川仡佬族苗族自治县), Zunyi, Guizhou
