= Wen Tingyun =

Chinese poet

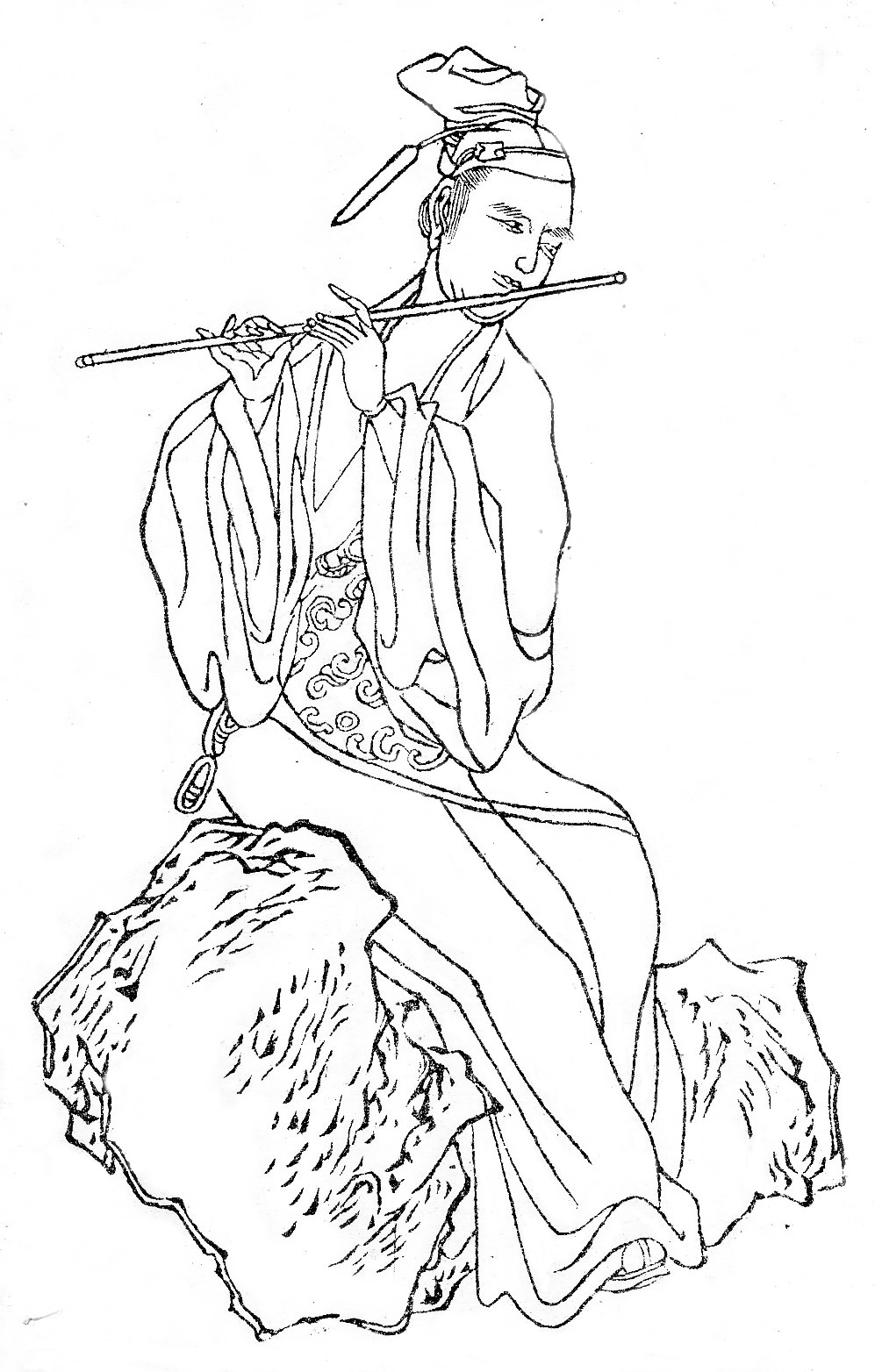
- Traditional Chinese: 溫庭筠
- Simplified Chinese: 温庭筠
Transcriptions
Standard Mandarin
- Hanyu Pinyin: Wēn Tíngyún
- Wade–Giles: Wên T'ing-yün
Yue: Cantonese
- Jyutping: Wan^{1} Ting^{4}-wan^{4}
Middle Chinese
- Middle Chinese: Ɂwən Dieng-jwen

Wen Tingyun (simplified Chinese: 温庭筠; traditional Chinese: 溫庭筠; pinyin: Wēn Tíngyún; 812–866) born Wen Qi (simplified Chinese: 温歧; traditional Chinese: 溫歧; pinyin: Wēn Qí), courtesy name Feiqing (simplified Chinese: 飞卿; traditional Chinese: 飛卿; pinyin: Fēiqīng) was a Chinese poet. He was an important Chinese lyricist of the late Tang dynasty.

He was born in modern Qi, Shanxi province, China. Over his literary career, Wen became regarded as the first truly distinctive writer of ci, the song-verse style of poetry that dominated Chinese poetry during much of the late Tang dynasty and the Song dynasty. Most of his poems are "boudoir"-style verses that described the opulent furnishings and gardens of solitary women and their hidden desires. This style of poetry was commonly used for romantic communications between men and women in the entertainment districts of the Chinese capital Chang'an during the Tang dynasty.

Wen is also considered to be the founder of “Hua Jian”, the school of Ci (or the Flowery school). This style of poets focusses on a set of distinct patterns and a rhythmic structure. Approximately 300 of his poems were preserved. More than 70 of his Ci poems are collected by the later generations in books like Hua Jian Ji and Jin Quan Ci .

His son Wen Xian (温憲) was also a poet.

== Personal experience ==
Date of birth

Wen Tingyun's date of birth is unknown His Wikipedia page in Chinese says he was born circa 801. Others date his birth to around 812. And scholars like Mou believe that he was born in 798.

Childhood

Wen Tingyun was born in Taiyuan. He was a descendant of Wen Yanbo, a prime minister in the early Tang dynasty. Wen had an early interest in literature but he had few opportunities to study since his father died while he was still young. A family friend stepped in and funded his studies together with the friend's son, Duan Chengshi.

Reputation amongst supervisors

Early in Wen's career, he was popular amongst the nobility. The prime minister, Linghu Tao, treated Wen Tingyun favorably at first. The emperor Li Chen loved a song called “Pu Sa Man (Bodhisattva-like barbarian)” very much. Linghu Tao then dedicated Wen Tingyun's twenty lyrics of Pu Sa Man to the emperor and lied that he wrote it by himself. Linghu Tao asked Wen to keep it as a secret but soon later, Wen spread the story. Another anecdote is that Tingyun in front of other ministers told Linghu Tao that as a prime minister, he should read more books, which made Linghu Tao displeased and angry. After this, Linghu Tao plotted against Wen Tingyun and bribed the examiner to hinder Wen's selection and promotion. Wen Tingyun took the imperial examination several times, failing because of Linghu Tao's machinations. When Wen realized this, he grew disappointed in the system and giving up his desire to become an official by way of the imperial examination. He often visited brothels. Wen Tingyun would still take the imperial exams but his aim was to help others pass.

Brief success in later life

In 859, Li Cui became the new emperor and Yang Shou was made his prime minister. In 866, Wen was appointed Instructor of the Imperial Academy. In order to prevent other examinees being framed like him, Wen Tingyun began to reform the imperial examination system as soon as he took office. Examinees can check the scores and check the articles of the champion. These changes made the examination process more transparent and fair but this conflicted with the interests of powerful nobles. Yang Shou demoted him. Soon thereafter, in 866, Wen Tingyun died.

== Poetry works ==
Wen Tingyun also engaged in music, so his poems tend to be rhythmic. His poems have a lot of themes and are profound in thoughts, and the artistic expression of his poems is various.

Much of his poetry focused on the expression of feelings and the description of the environment. The characters in his ci are mainly women and the main theme is to express their feeling of sorrow and miss.

A copy of Wen Tingyun's poetry collection in Shanghai jingjiangnan Library

Geng Louzi

Geng Louzi is one of Wen Tingyun's ci poems.

Paul F. Rouzer translated it as follow:

“Geng Louzi

Incense in the jade burner玉爐香，

Tears on the red candle紅蠟淚，

They stubbornly shine on autumn grief in painted halls偏照畫堂秋思。

Emerald mascara light眉翠薄，

Side-curl clouds thin，鬢雲殘，

The night is long, coverlet and pillow cold夜長衾枕寒。

Wutong trees梧桐樹，

And midnight rain 三更雨

Don't know the grief felt right now at parting不道離情正苦。

Leaf by leaf一葉葉，

Sound by sound一聲聲，

They drop on empty stairs till day空階滴到明。” (Rouzer 1993)

Geng louzi is also translated as "on the water clock at night". During this ci poetry, everything in the environment seems to has the same emotion of the character, and the character also complains about the environment that caused her even more bad feelings. By this way, the writer fused the emotion and scenes to better express the strong feelings of characters.

Buddha-like barbarian

Zhong-qi Cai translated it as follow:

“Buddha-like barbarian

Layer on layer of little hills, golds shimmer and fade, 小山重叠金明灭

Cloud locks hover over the fragrant snow of a cheek. 鬓云欲度香腮雪

Lazily rising to paint on mouth eyebrows, 懒起画蛾眉

Dallying with makeup and hair. 弄妆梳洗迟

yeyanqu

Blossoms are mirrored behind and before, 照花前后镜

Flowers faces reflect one another. 花面交相映

Newly embroidered on a jacked of silk 新帖绣罗襦

Are pair after pair of golden partridges.” (Cai 2008) 双双金鹧鸪

Buddha-like barbarian (Pu Sa Man) has more ornate imagery than "Geng Louzi". The first two lines are normally believed to describe the screen in the lady's house. The "pairs of partridges" and the word "lazily" indicated the conjugal happiness of the female character. There were not too many words describing the women's feeling, but the feeling of missing is hidden between the lines.

A Night Banquet

Sometimes, these poems about women also expressed Wen's dissatisfaction with the powerful.

Paul F. Rouzer translated A Night Banquet as follows:

“A Night Banquet

The long hairpins, a pair of dragonflies 长钗坠发双蜻蜓

In her dangling locks.

Where the green fields end and hills slant, 碧尽山斜开画屏

painted screens open.

The curly-whiskered duke’s son 虬须公子五侯客

and guests of the five marquis.

In one round down a thousand cups 一饮千钟如建瓴

like rain from the roof tiles.

Phoenix-throated, the beauties sing— 鸾咽奼唱圆无节

seamlessly, with perfection.

Brows contract—Xiang river mist— 眉敛湘烟袖回雪

sleeves are whirling snow.

“In this clear night, kind feelings 清夜恩情四座同

are shared by one and all;

So don’t let the canal waters 莫令沟水东西别

part, east and west.”

Set upright, the candles weep, 亭亭蜡泪香珠残

their scented beads wane.

Dark dew and morning wind 暗露晓风罗幕寒

gauze curtains chill.

Imposing halberd banners 飘飖戟带俨相次

flutter in ranks.

Their twenty-four poles 二十四枝龙画竿

are dragon bedecked.

Shrill pipes, flurried strings— 裂管萦弦共繁曲

a piece in symphony.

Tiny ripples in scented goblets— 芳樽细浪倾春醁

darkness toss off the spring brew.

In the high rooms, guests disperse 高楼客散杏花多

mid so many apricot blossoms.

With yearning, the new frog-moon 脉脉新蟾如瞪目

stares down with amorous eyes.” (Rouzer 1993)

== Personal achievements and influence ==
Wen Tingyun wrote down a large number of poems and he was the founder of the flowery school of Ci. He was the first person to write down a large number of Ci, which was important to the promotion of the prosperity of Ci in the successive Song dynasty.

== The flowery ==
The Flowery School was not established intentionally by Wen Tingyun, but later generations praised him as the founder. The formation of Flowery School of Ci had an inseparable relationship with the political factors at that time. After the An Lushan Rebellion, the politics and society of Tang Dynasty were decayed. As a result, driven by the works of Wen Tingyun, more and more people began to follow a delicate form that focused on emotional expression, and boldly narrated the love between men and women. Because these works were included in Hua Jian Ji, later generations then name this style of ci the flowery (Hua Jian) school .

== Affairs and anecdotes ==
Wen Bacha

After Wen Tingyun found himself framed by Linghu Tao, he took the imperial exam just to help others cheating. People gave him a nickname called Wen Bacha (means Wen Eight crossing fingers) because he can finish writing an article after crossing his hand eight times. Even when he was arranged to take the exam alone under the curtain, he still helped eight people secretly during an exam.

Insulted at Jiang Huai

When Wen Tingyun was young, he once traveled Jiang Huai region. Because he was famous for his poems at that time, the Imperial Deputy of Yangzi Court Yao Xu offered him a large amount of money. However, Wen Tingyun used all of this money in the brothels. Yao Xu was very angry after hearing this, then whipped him fiercely and drove him away. This made Wen Tingyun notorious, and nobody was willing to recommend him to take the imperial exam.

Wen's elder sister was angry with Yao Xu because of this, she found out who he is and went to his office, shouting and pulling his sleeves. She said: "It's normal for a young man like my brother to do this. How can you whip him? He's doing nothing now because of you!”. Then, she wept loudly and it took a long time before she let him go. Yao Xu was frightened and enraged, and finally died because of the illness caused by this event.

Insulted at Guang Ling

After Wen Tingyun went back to the Jiang Dong region, Linghu Tao was still the prime minister but Wen was unwilling to visit him anymore. One night, he was drunk, and he was beaten by the patrolling soldier. His teeth were broken and he had no choice but to wrote to Linghu Tao because this could be seen as a great insult to literati. Linghu Tao accused a clerk but acquitted the patrolling soldier, and he blamed this incident on Wen's bad manner.

Some scholars like Mou believe that these two incidents may have been adapted by the eunuch at that time to belittle Wen Tingyun.

Changing the name

Wen Tingyun used to have another name called Wen Qi. This may have something to do with the Jiang Huai incident as he can't use that name to take the exam anymore (Mou 2004). Some people believe his name has been Wen Qi since he was born until he changed the name to Wen Tingyun to take imperial exams. However, some researchers like Mou believe his name was Wen Tingyun at first, then he changed that to Wen Qi and finally changed back to the original name Wen Tingyun.

Yu Xuanji

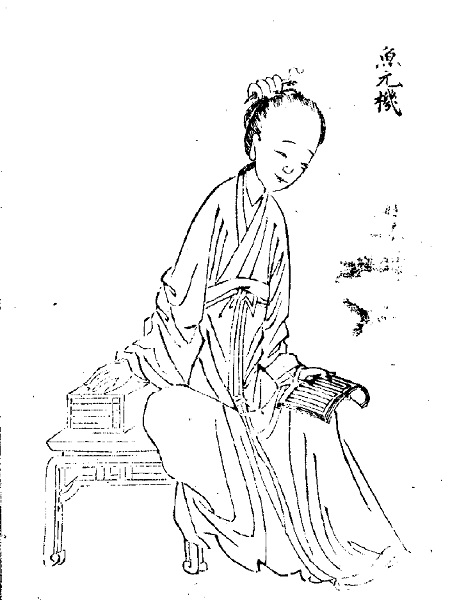
Yu Xuanji

Yu Xuanji was a female Chinese poet. In the beginning, her name was Yu Youwei and she was a young maid doing laundry in a brothel until Wen Tingyun found her, raised her up, and became her teacher. After she grows up, Yu Youwei was deeply attracted by Wen Tingyun but Wen Tingyun didn't accept it as he believes she deserves a better future. Wen Tingyun introduced her to his friend Li Yi as his concubine. However, Li Yi's wife felt angry about Yu Youwei and always abused her. In order to protect Yu Youwei, Li Yi sent her to a Taoist temple and promise her to pick her up three years later. Since then, she got a new name Yu Xuanji, which means “mystery” in Chinese. Yu Xuanji's waiting didn't have a good result because Li Yi was dispatched to another place. She thought she was deceived then no longer believes in men, and transformed her temple into a brothel to survive on her own Finally, 26-year-old Yu Xuanji was sentenced to death because she killed a maid who was found cheating with her lover.
