= Haeundae =

Haeundae may refer to:

- Haeundae Beach, an urban beach in Busan, South Korea
- Haeundae District, a district of Busan, South Korea
- Haeundae station, a station on the Busan Metro Line 2
- Tidal Wave (2009 film), (Korean: 해운대; RR: Haeundae), a 2009 South Korean disaster film

== See also ==
- Hyundai (disambiguation)
