= Centum City station =

Station of the Busan Metro

206 센텀시티 (벡스코·법무법인 대륜) Centum City (BEXCO·Daeryun Law Firm)
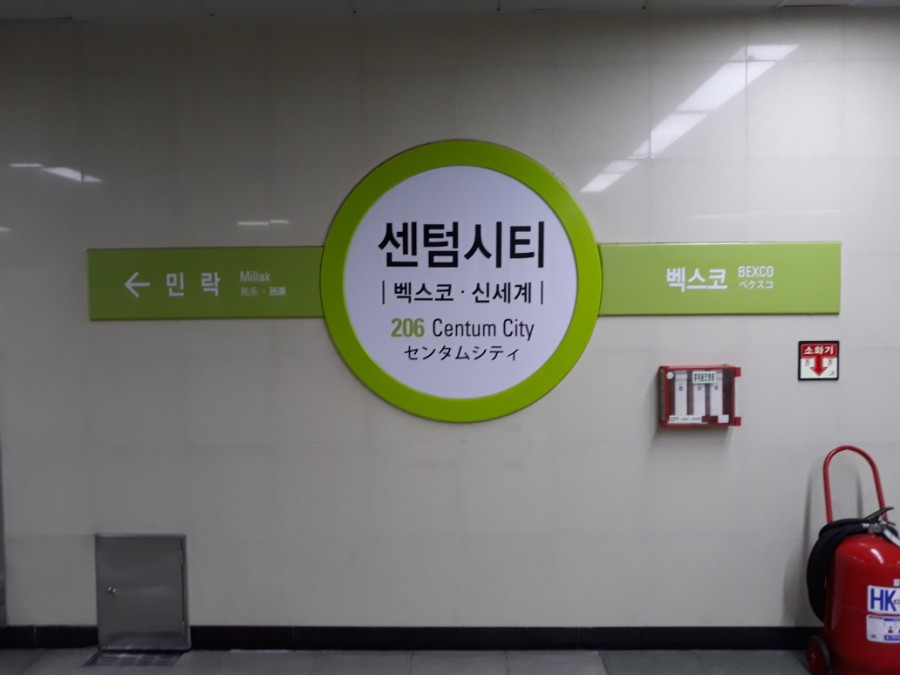

Korean name
- Hangul: 센텀시티역
- Hanja: 센텀시티驛
- Revised Romanization: Senteom siti yeok
- McCune–Reischauer: Sent'ŏm sit'i yŏk

General information
- Location: U-dong, Haeundae District, Busan; South Korea
- Coordinates: 35.1689°N 129.1320°E
- Operator: Busan Transportation Corporation
- Line: Busan Metro Line 2
- Platforms: 2
- Tracks: 2

Construction
- Structure type: Underground

Other information
- Station code: 206

History
- Opened: August 29, 2002; 24 years ago
Location

Centum City Station (Korean: 센텀시티역) is a station on the Busan Metro Line 2 in U-dong, Haeundae District, Busan, South Korea.

Preceding station	Busan Metro	Following station
BEXCO towards Jangsan	Line 2	Millak towards Yangsan
