= Fengtang Town =

Town in Chao'an, Chaozhou, China

Fengtang 凤塘镇
- Town
- Location in Guangdong
- Coordinates: 23°37′38″N 116°34′05″E
- Country: People's Republic of China
- Province: Guangdong
- Prefecture-level city: Chaozhou
- District: Chao'an
- Time zone: UTC+8 (China Standard)

Fengtang (simplified Chinese: 凤塘; traditional Chinese: 鳳塘; pinyin: Fèngtáng) is a town in south China, under the jurisdiction of Chao'an District, Chaozhou City, Guangdong Province. It has an area of 38.58 square kilometers and a population of 91,234 persons.

== Administrative divisions ==
Fengtang Town has jurisdiction over the following sub-areas:

Fengtang Community, Dongmen Village, Nanmen Village, Dacheng Village, Fugang Village, Fenggang Village, Nanlong Village, Qiucuo Village, Panyang Village, Fengcuo Village, Jilin Village, Shuanggang Village, Humei Village, Linpan Village, Donglong Village, Goutou Village, Yingfeng Village, Fengshui Village, Fengli Village, Yujiao Village, Xinxiang Village, Yiqiao Village, Qiyuan Village, Lindou Village, Shutu Village, Hongxiang Village, Donghe Village, Shenghu Village, Xihe Village, Xinhe Village and He'an Village.

== Honorary title ==
Fengtang was selected as one of the "Top 1,000 Towns of China in 2021".
