= Jiseok station =

Metro station in Yongin, South Korea

Y112 지석 Jiseok
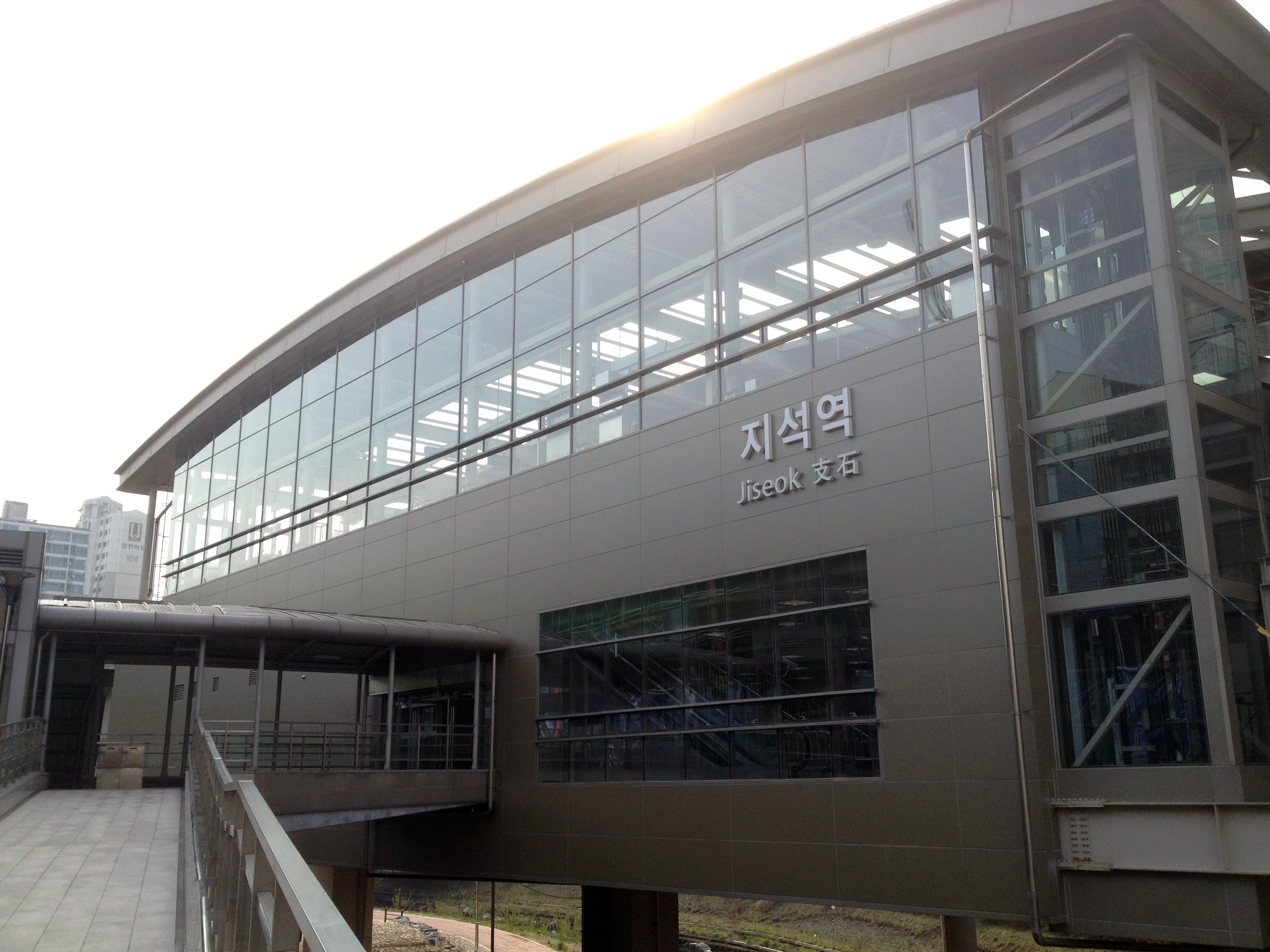

Korean name
- Hangul: 지석역
- Hanja: 支石驛
- Revised Romanization: Jiseok yeok
- McCune–Reischauer: Chisŏk yŏk

General information
- Location: Sangha-dong, Giheung-gu, Yongin
- Coordinates: 37.2698°N 127.1367°E
- Operator: Yongin EverLine Co,. Ltd. Neo Trans
- Line: EverLine
- Platforms: 2
- Tracks: 2

Key dates
- April 26, 2013: EverLine opened
Location

Jiseok Station (Korean: 지석역) is a metro station of the Everline located in Sangha-dong, Giheung-gu, Yongin, South Korea.

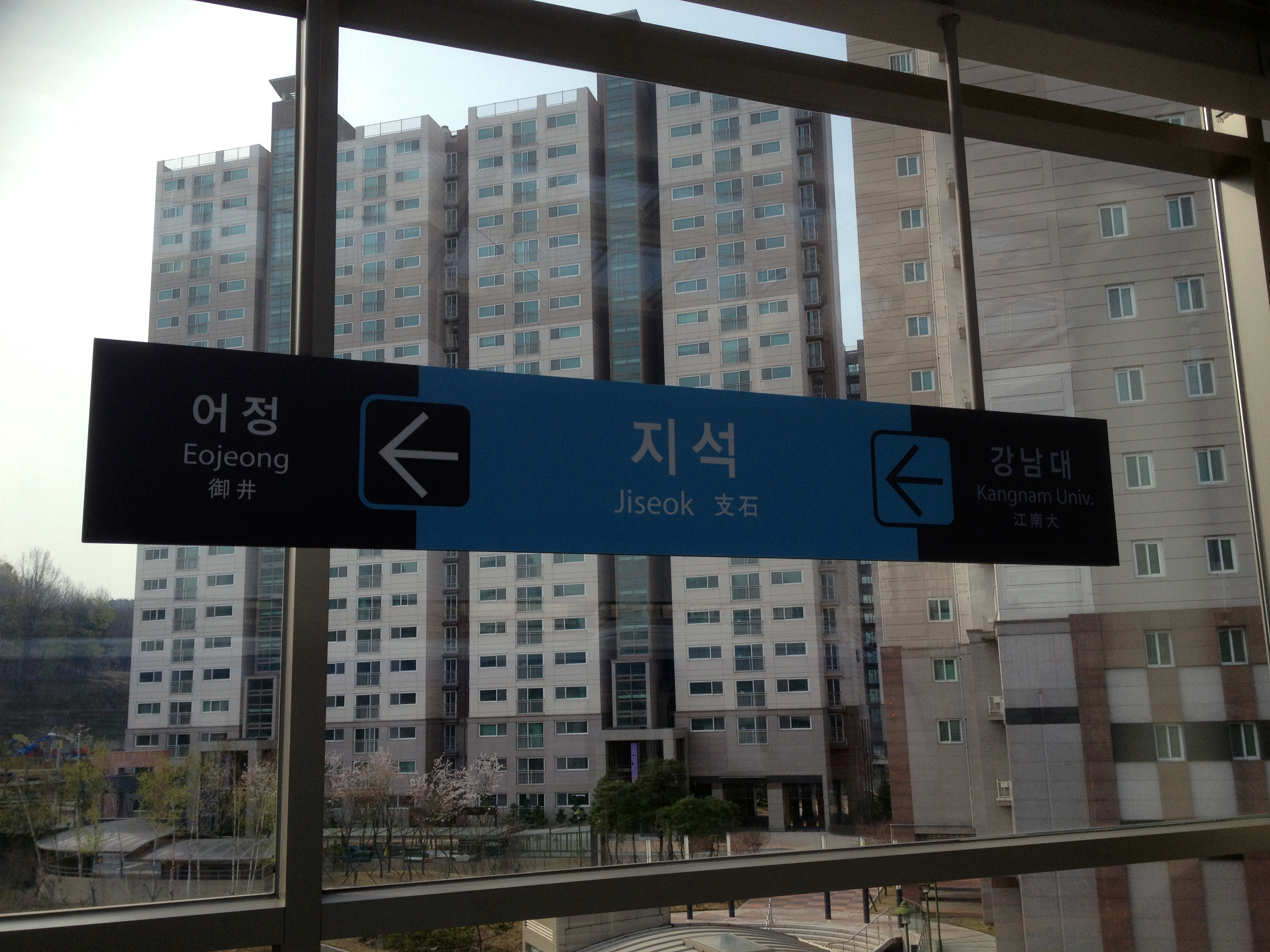

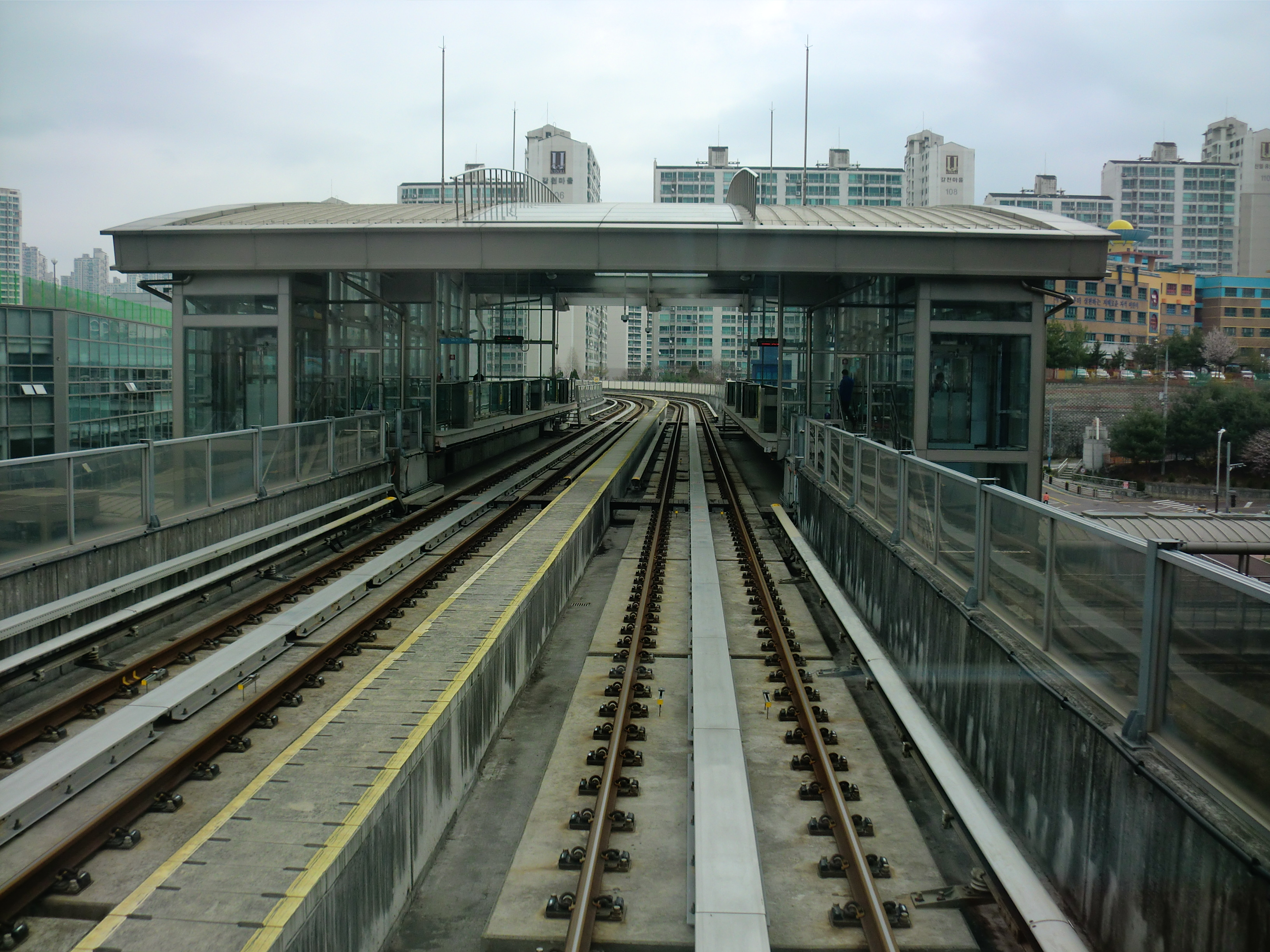

Preceding station	Seoul Metropolitan Subway	Following station
Kangnam University towards Giheung	EverLine	Eojeong towards Jeondae–Everland
