= Eojeong station =

Metro station in Yongin, South Korea

Y113 어정 Eojeong
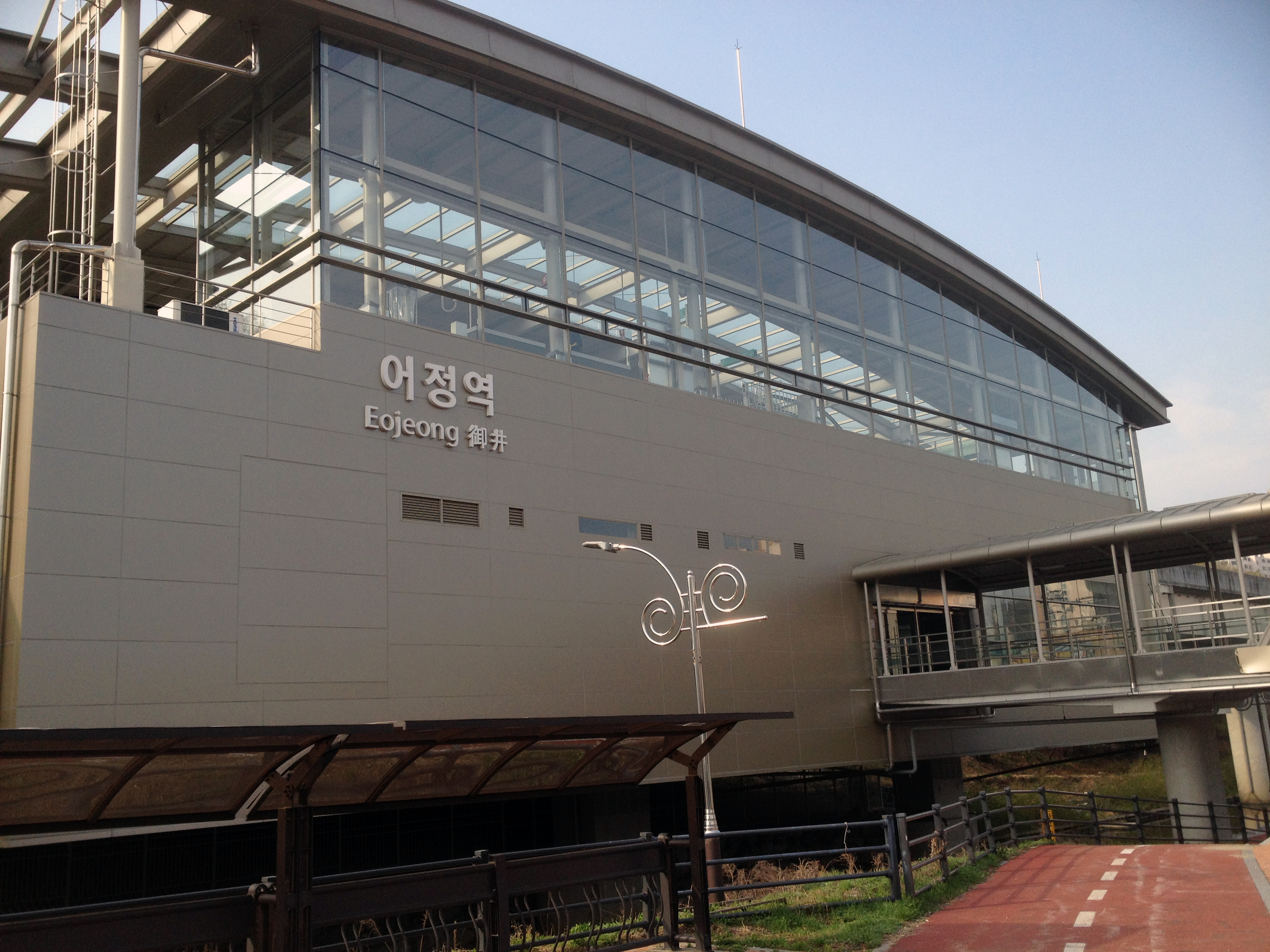

Korean name
- Hangul: 어정역
- Hanja: 御停驛
- Revised Romanization: Eojeong-yeok
- McCune–Reischauer: Ŏjŏng-yŏk

General information
- Location: Jung-dong, Giheung-gu, Yongin
- Operator: Yongin EverLine Co,. Ltd. Neo Trans
- Line: EverLine
- Platforms: 2
- Tracks: 2

Key dates
- April 26, 2013: EverLine opened
Location

Eojeong Station (Korean: 어정역; Hanja: 御停驛) is a station of the Everline in Jung-dong, Giheung-gu, Yongin, South Korea.

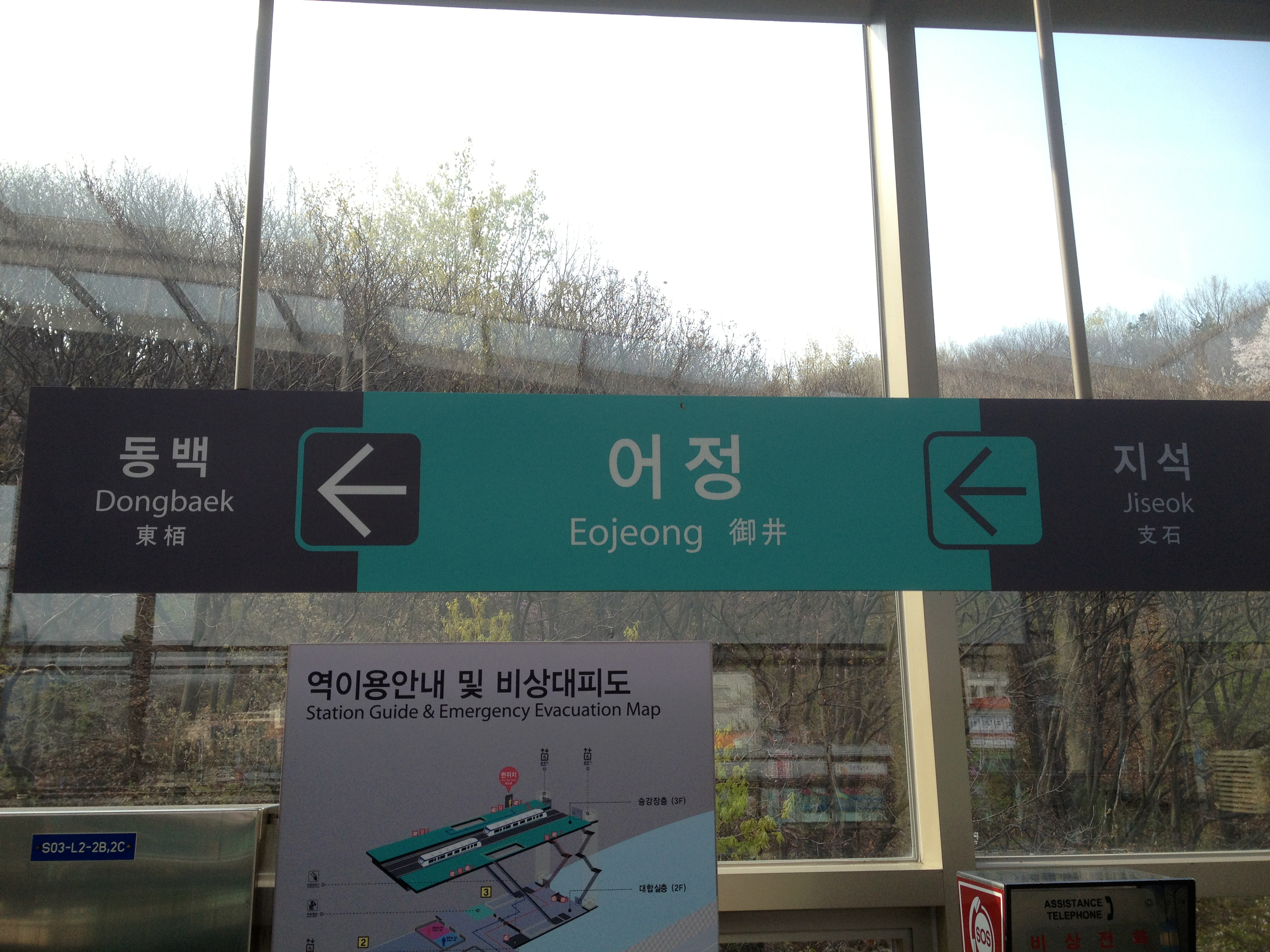

Preceding station	Seoul Metropolitan Subway	Following station
Jiseok towards Giheung	EverLine	Dongbaek towards Jeondae–Everland
