= Jung-dong station (Busan Metro) =

Station of the Busan Metro

202 중동 Jung-dong
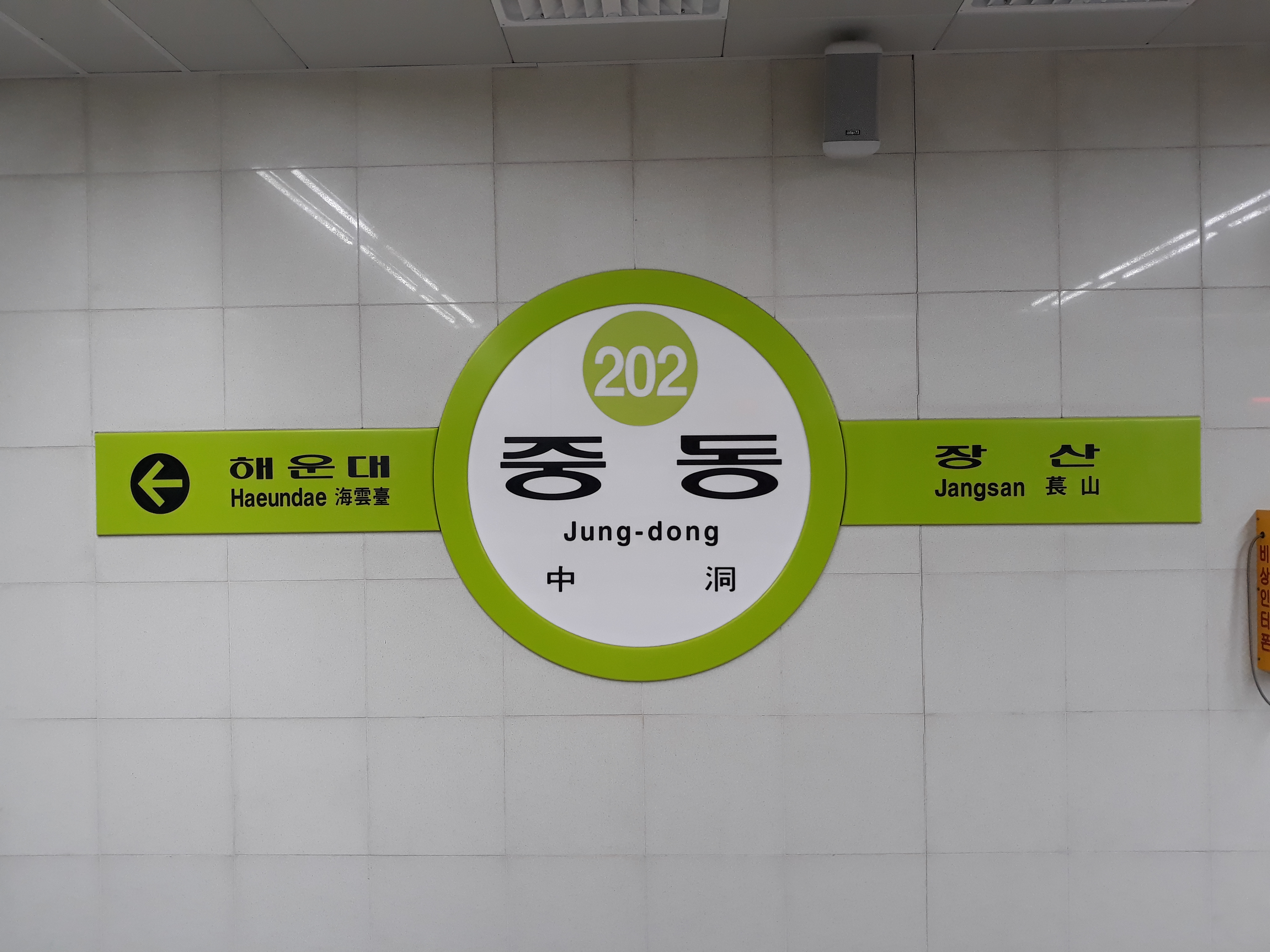

Korean name
- Hangul: 중동역
- Hanja: 中洞驛
- Revised Romanization: Jungdong yeok
- McCune–Reischauer: Chungtom yŏk

General information
- Location: Jung-dong, Haeundae District, Busan; South Korea
- Coordinates: 35.1667°N 129.1678°E
- Operator: Busan Transportation Corporation
- Line: Busan Metro Line 2
- Platforms: 2
- Tracks: 2

Construction
- Structure type: Underground

Other information
- Station code: 202

History
- Opened: August 29, 2002; 24 years ago
Location

Jung-dong Station (Korean: 중동역; Hanja: 中洞驛) is a station on the Busan Metro Line 2 in Jung-dong, Haeundae District, Busan, South Korea.

Preceding station	Busan Metro	Following station
Jangsan Terminus	Line 2	Haeundae towards Yangsan
