= Chodang station =

Metro station in Yongin, South Korea

Y115 초당 Chodang
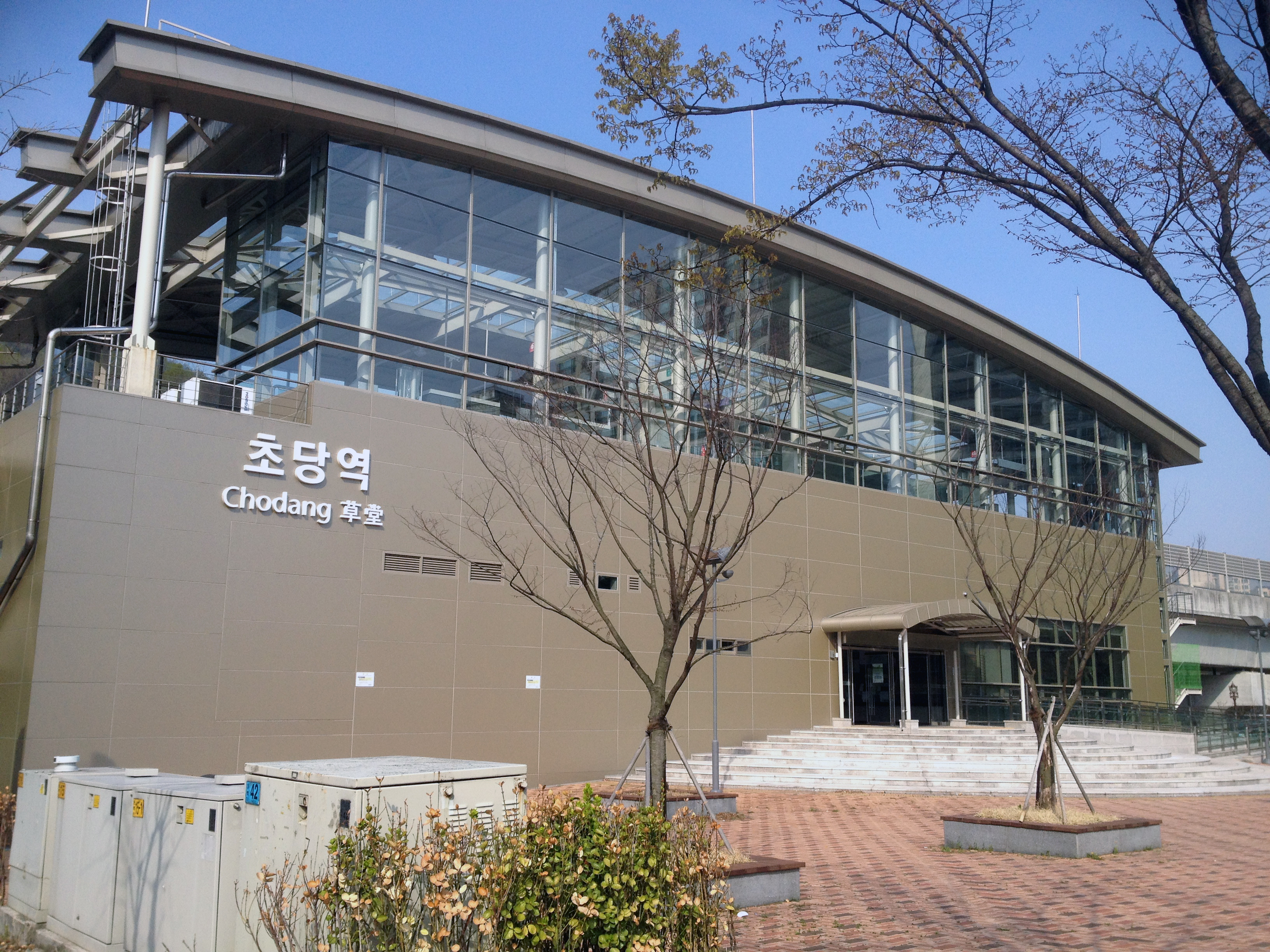

Korean name
- Hangul: 초당역
- Hanja: 草堂驛
- Revised Romanization: Chodang-yeok
- McCune–Reischauer: Ch'otang-yŏk

General information
- Location: Jung-dong, Giheung-gu, Yongin
- Coordinates: 37.2609°N 127.1595°E
- Operator: Yongin EverLine Co,. Ltd. Neo Trans
- Line: EverLine
- Platforms: 2 side platforms
- Tracks: 2

Construction
- Structure type: Elevated
- Accessible: Yes

Other information
- Station code: Y115
- Website: Station Map

Key dates
- April 26, 2013: EverLine opened

Services
Preceding station	Seoul Metropolitan Subway	Following station
Dongbaek towards Giheung	EverLine	Samga towards Jeondae–Everland
Location

Chodang Station (Korean: 초당역) is a station of the Everline in Jung-dong, Giheung District, Yongin, South Korea.

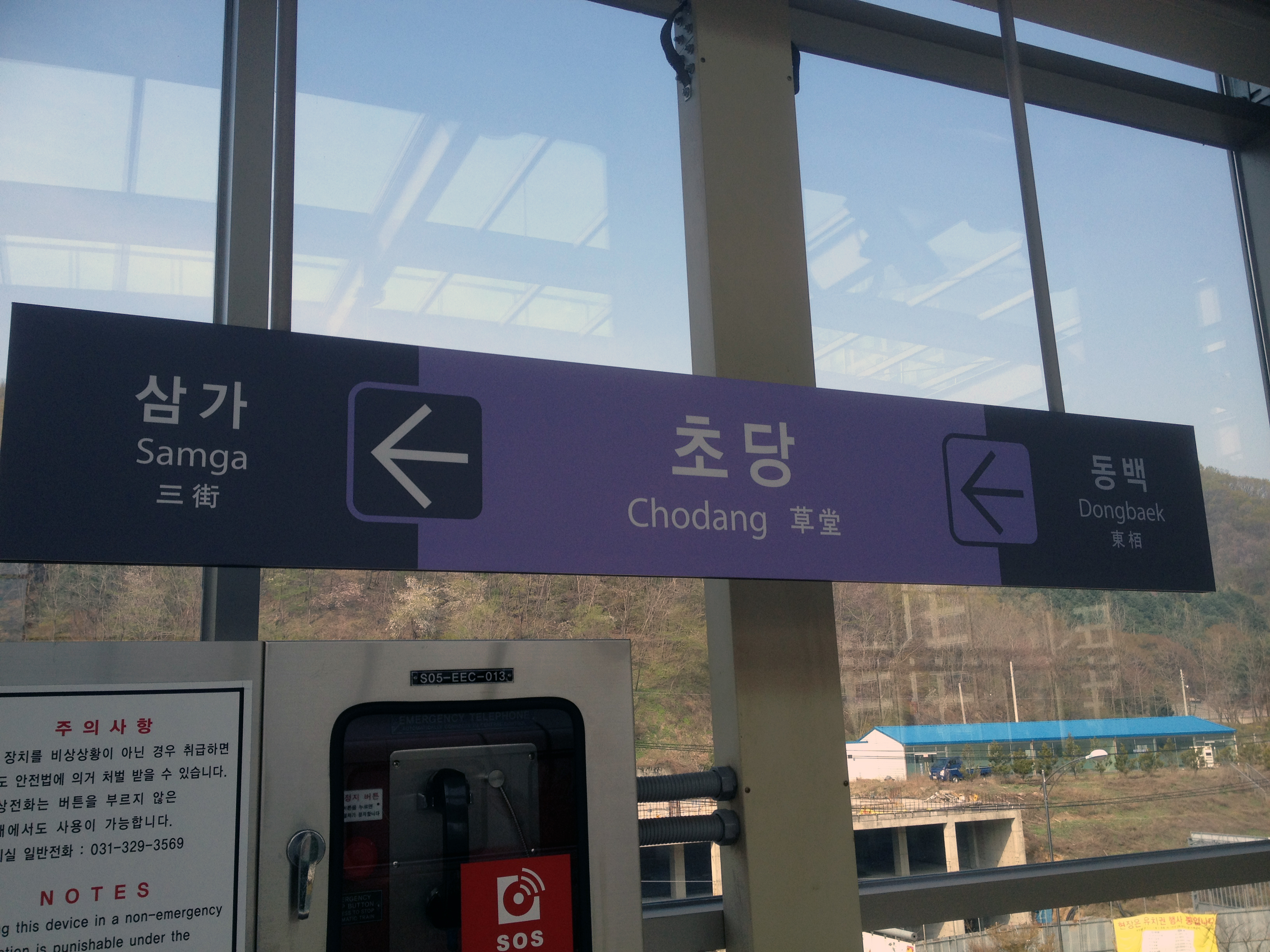
