= BEXCO station =

Station of the Busan Metro

벡스코; BEXCO
205
벡스코 (시립미술관)
BEXCO
(Busan Museum of Art)
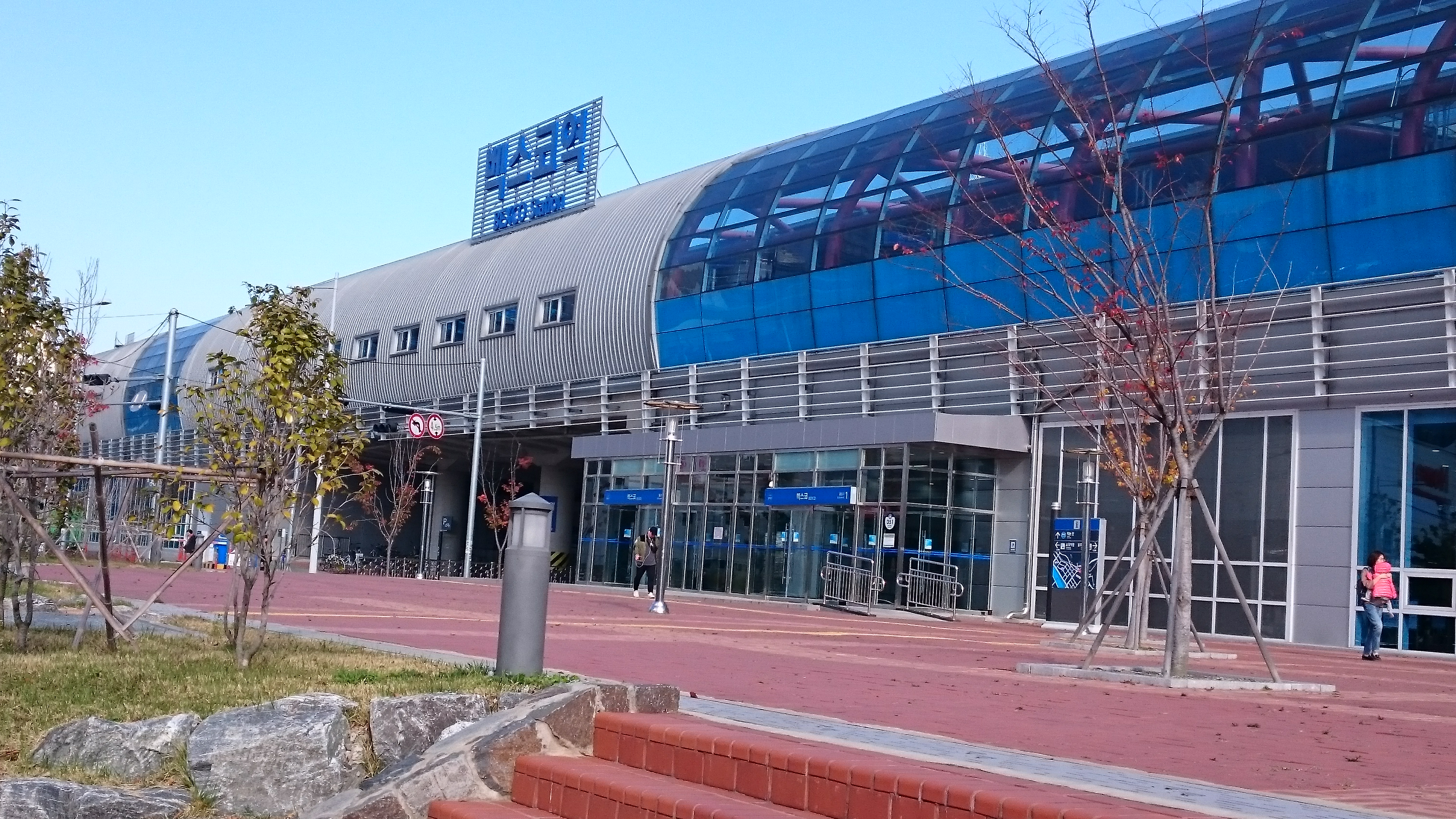
- Korail station

General information
- Location: U-dong, Haeundae District, Busan; South Korea
- Coordinates: 35°9′47.71″N 129°8′41.45″E
- Operator: Busan Transportation Corporation; Korail
- Lines: Line 2 Donghae Line

Construction
- Structure type: Aboveground (Donghae Line); Underground (Line 2)

Other information
- Station code: 205 (Line 2); K119 (Donghae Line)

History
- Opened: April 1, 1996; 30 years ago August 29, 2002; 24 years ago (Line 2)
- Former names: Busan Museum of Art Station (Line 2); Uil (Donghae Line)

Services
Preceding station	Busan Metro	Following station
Dongbaek towards Jangsan	Line 2	Centum City towards Yangsan
Centum towards Bujeon	Donghae Line	Sinhaeundae towards Taehwagang
Location

BEXCO station (Korean: 벡스코역) is a station on the Busan Metro Line 2 and Donghae Line in U-dong, Haeundae District, Busan, South Korea. The Line 2 subname in parentheses is "Busan Museum of Art". The metro station was formerly named "Busan Museum of Art Station", and the Donghae Line station was formerly "Uil Station".

== Station Layout ==
=== Line 2 ===
Centum City ↑
S/B | | N/B
↓ Dongbaek

Southbound	← ● Line 2 toward Jangsan
Northbound	● Line 2 toward Yangsan →

=== Donghae Line ===
↑ Sinhaeundae
S/B | | N/B
Centum ↓

Northbound	● Donghae Line toward Taehwagang →
Southbound	← ● Donghae Line toward Bujeon

== Gallery ==
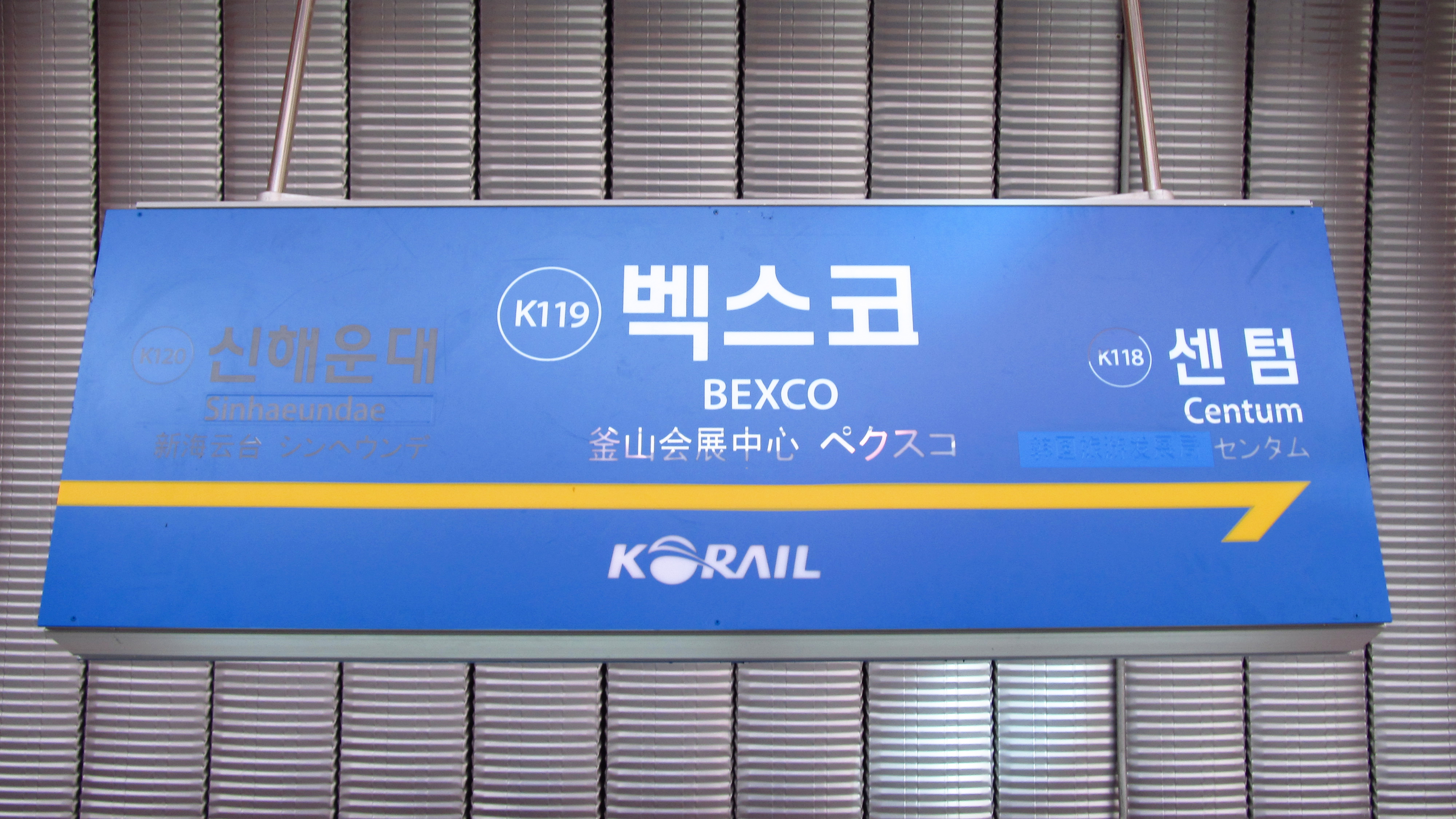
Station Sign (Donghae Line)

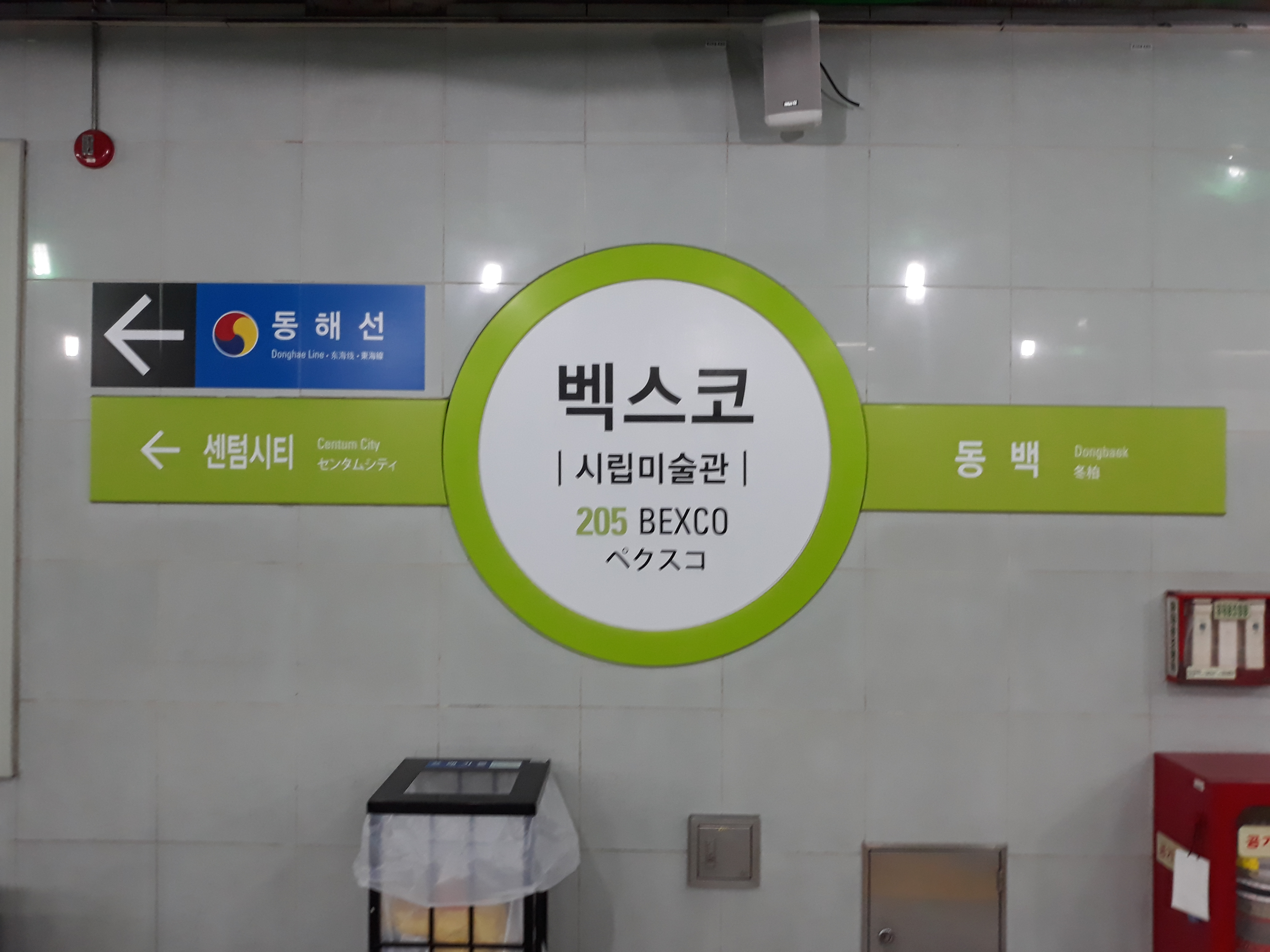
Station Sign (Line 2)

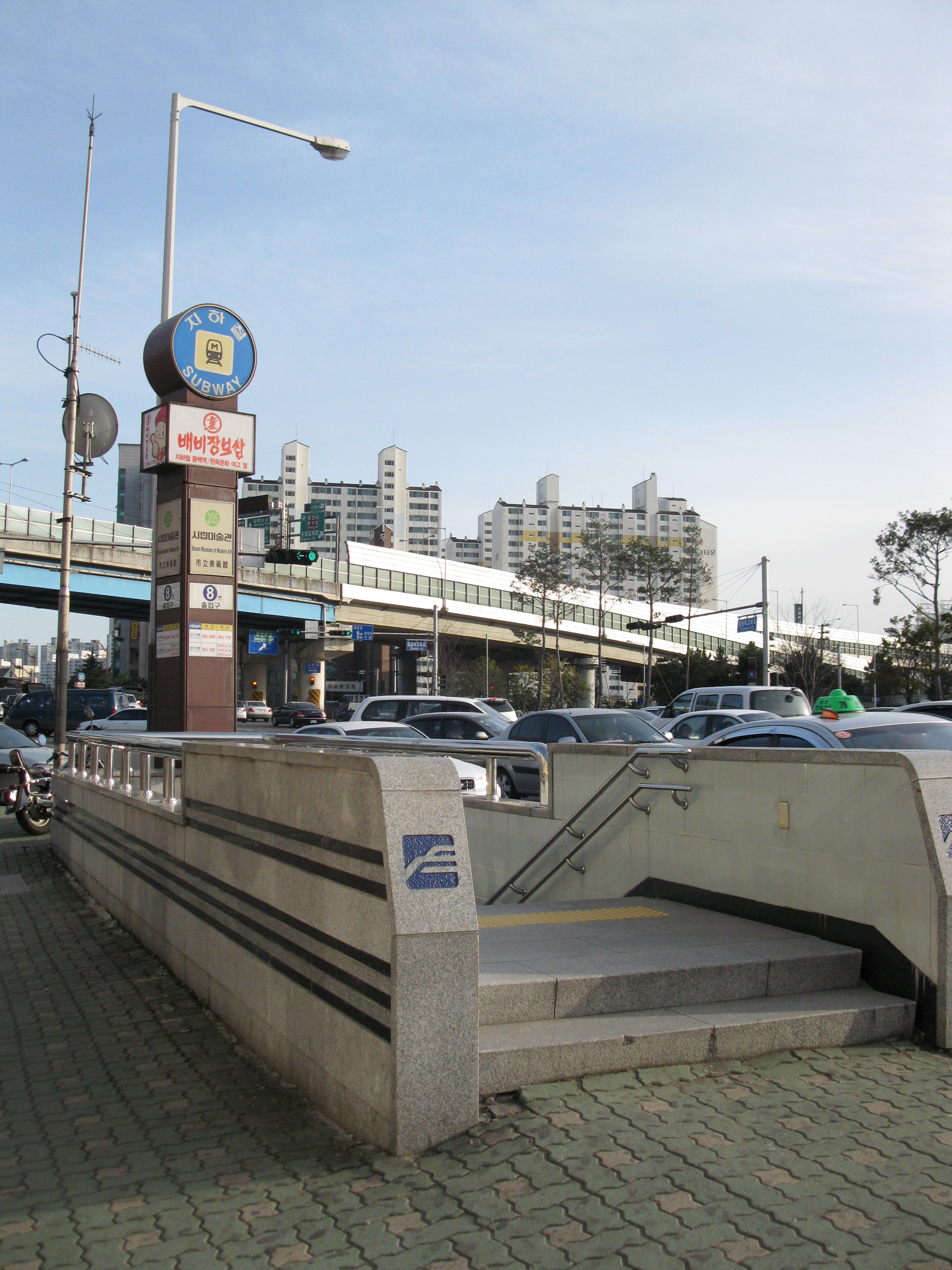
BEXCO station (Line 2) Entrance

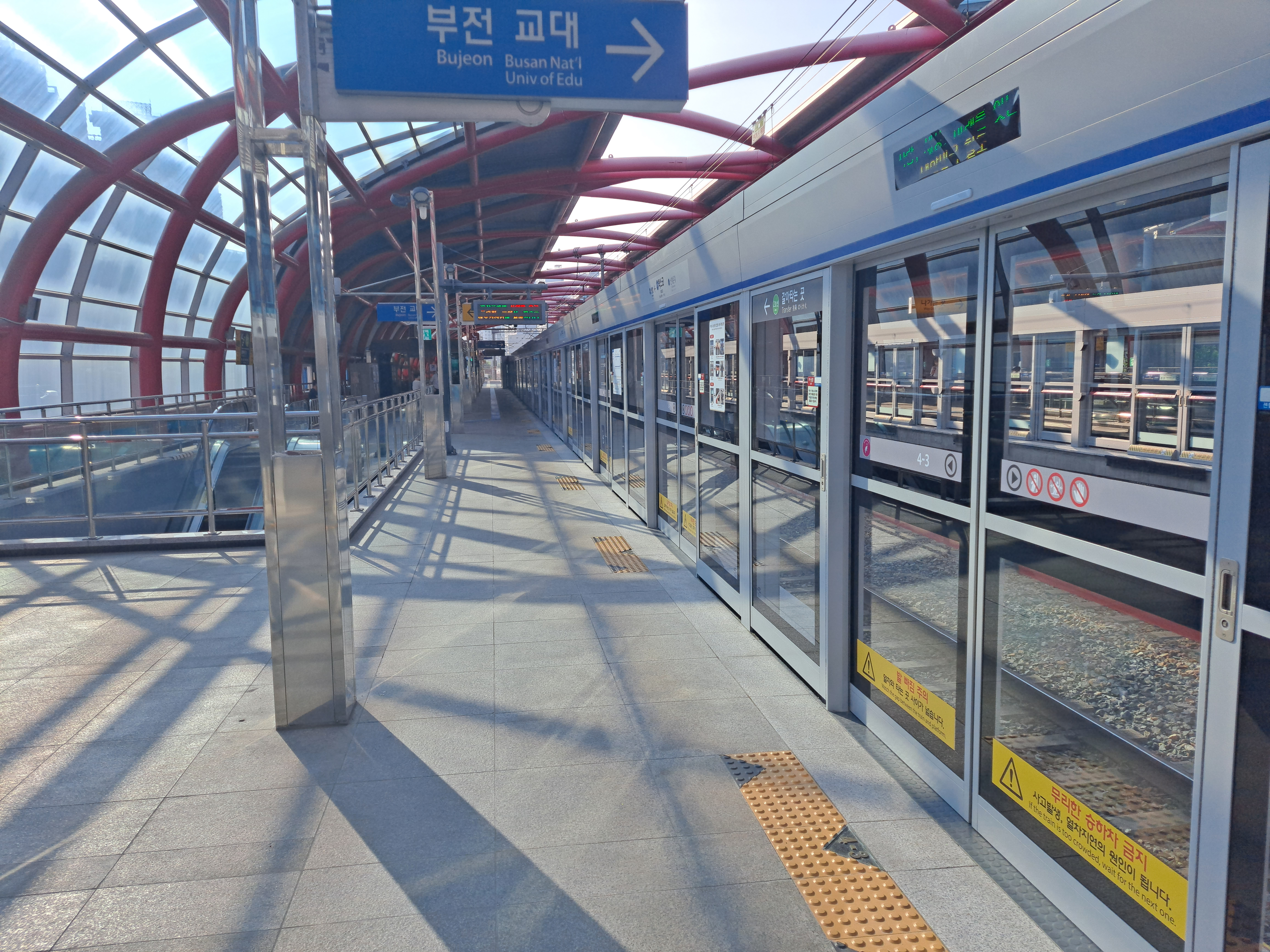
Platform (Donghae Line)
