= Dongfeng, Chao'an County =

Dongfeng 东凤镇
- Town
- Location in Guangdong
- Coordinates: 23°32′36″N 116°40′41″E
- Country: People's Republic of China
- Province: Guangdong
- Prefecture-level city: Chaozhou
- County: Chao'an
- Village-level divisions: 1 residential community 34 villages
- Elevation: 9.4 m (31 ft)
- Time zone: UTC+8 (China Standard)
- Area code: 0768

Dongfeng (simplified Chinese: 东凤; traditional Chinese: 東鳳; pinyin: Dōngfèng; lit. 'eastern phoenix') is a town of Chao'an County in eastern Guangdong province, China, on the southern (right) bank of the lower reaches of the Han River. As of 2011, it has 1 residential community (社区) and 34 villages under its administration.

== See also ==
- List of township-level divisions of Guangdong
