= Gangnam (disambiguation) =

Gangnam or Kangnam may refer to:

== Places ==
- Gangnam, an affluent region of Seoul, South Korea
  - Gangnam District, an administrative district located within the Greater Gangnam Area
- Kangnam County, a county in Pyongyang, North Korea
- Kangnam Mountains, a mountain range in North Korea

== Stations ==
- Gangnam station, a station of Seoul Subway Line 2 in Seoul
- Gangnam-gu Office station, a subway station of Seoul Subway Line 7
- Kangnam University station, a station of Everline, in Yongin, Gyeonggi Province, South Korea

== Other uses ==
- Kangnam (singer) (born 1987), a member of the South Korean hip hop group M.I.B.
- Kangnam University, a university in Yongin, Gyeonggi Province, South Korea
- Gangnam-daero, an urban expressway in Seoul, South Korea

== See also ==
- "Gangnam Style", a 2012 song by PSY
- Han River (Korea)
- Jiangnan (disambiguation)
