= Jiangnan (disambiguation) =

Jiangnan is the region south of the lower reaches of the Yangtze River in China.

Jiangnan may also refer to:

== Places ==
- Jiangnan District, Nanning, Guangxi, China
- Jiangnan Subdistrict, Meizhou, Guangdong, China
- Jiangnan, Linxiang (江南镇), a township-level division of Linxiang, Hunan, China

=== Historical ===
- Jiangnan Circuit, a circuit during the Tang dynasty
- State of Jiangnan or Southern Tang (937–976)
- Jiangnan province, a province of China during part of the Qing dynasty

== People ==
- Henry Liu (1932–1984), Taiwanese writer and journalist with the pen name Jiang Nan
- Jiang Nan (novelist) (born 1977), Chinese novelist

== Other uses ==
- Jiangnan Daying, a 19th-century army group established by the Qing Dynasty
- Jiangnan Shipyard, a shipyard in Shanghai, China
- Jiangnan University, a university in Wuxi, Jiangsu, China
- Jiangnan Automobile, an automobile manufacturing company, headquartered in Xiangtan, China

== See also ==
- Gangnam (disambiguation), Korean equivalent
- Ying Nan, a fictional character in the Marvel Cinematic Universe
- 江南 (disambiguation)
