= Gangdong =

Gangdong ('east of the river') may refer to:

- Gangdong District, a district in Seoul, South Korea
- Gangdong-myeon, Gyeongju, a township in Gyeongju, North Gyeongsang, South Korea
- Gangdong-myeon, Gangneung, a township in Gangneung, Gangwon, South Korea
- Gangdong-dong, a neighborhood in Gangseo District, Busan, South Korea
- Gangdong, Buk District, Ulsan, South Korea
- Kangdong, a county in Pyongyang, North Korea
