= Konan =

Konan may refer to:

- Conan (disambiguation), a name spelt "Konan" in the Breton language
- Kɔnan, a male given name in a number of Akan cultures, chiefly the Baoulé people, for whom it is typically given to any male born on a Wednesday (mlan), and corresponds to the female given name Amlan (usually transcribed as « Aménan » in French). It corresponds to various given names in other Akan cultural groups : Kobénan, Kablan, Kwabená, etc. (see Akan names).

== People ==
- Konan Naito (1866–1934), Japanese historian and sinologist
- Konan Serge Kouadio (born 1988), Ivorian footballer playing for Fredrikstad F.K.
- Axel Cédric Konan (born 1983), Ivorian footballer who last played for Swiss Super League team A.C.Bellinzona
- Denise Konan, Interim Chancellor of the University of Hawaiʻi at Mānoa
- Didier Konan Ya (born 1984), footballer who plays for Fortuna Düsseldorf in Germany and the Côte d'Ivoire national team
- Charles Konan Banny (born 1940), Prime Minister in the Ivory Coast in 2006–2007
- Henri Konan Bédié (born 1935), President of the Ivory Coast from 1993 to 1999
- Karl "Konan" Wilson (born 1990), of south London rap duo Krept and Konan
- Oussou Konan Anicet (1989-2022), Ivorian Footballer

=== Fiction ===
- Konan (Naruto), a character in the Naruto universe

== Places ==
- Kōnan, Aichi (江南市), a city in Aichi Prefecture
- Kōnan, Kōchi (香南市), a city in Kochi Prefecture
- Konan, Shiga (湖南市), a city in Shiga Prefecture
- Kōnan, Saitama (江南町), a former town in Saitama Prefecture
- Kōnan, Kagawa (香南町), a former town in Kagawa Prefecture
- Kōnan, Shiga (甲南町), a former town in Shiga Prefecture
- Kōnan, Tokyo (港南) in Minato, Tokyo
- Konan University, a university located in the city of Kobe, Japan
- Kōnan-ku, Yokohama (港南区) in Yokohama
- Hungnam (興南市), a former city in North Hamgyong Province, North Korea, named Konan during the Japanese occupation of Korea 1910–1945

== Businesses ==
- Kōnan Railway Company, a railway operator in Aomori Prefecture, Japan
- Kōnan Bus Company, a bus company headquartered in Hirosaki, Aomori, Japan

== See also ==
- Konnan (born 1964)
