= Millak station =

Station of the Busan Metro

207 민락 Millak
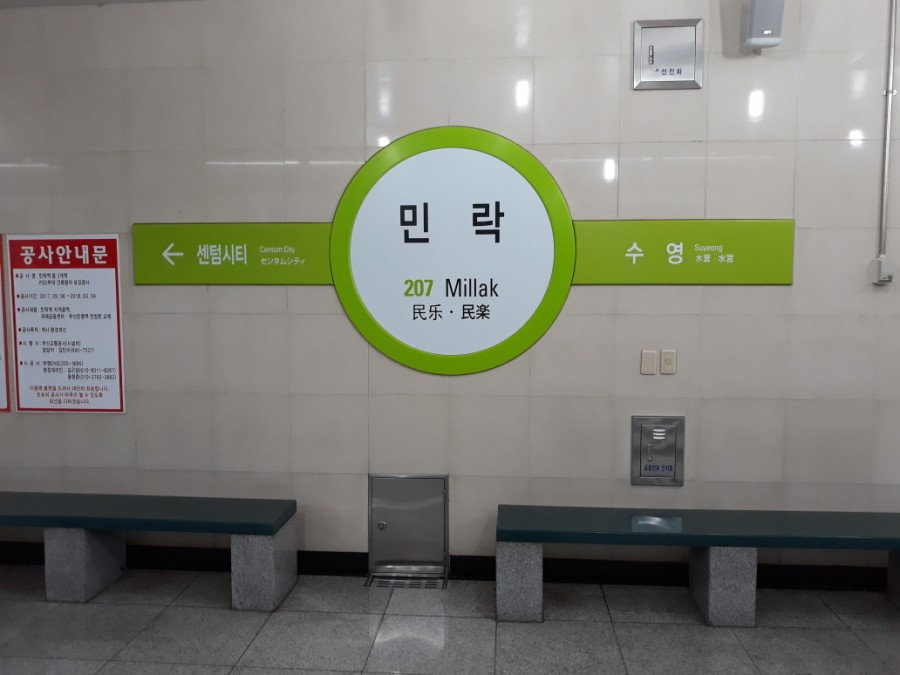

Korean name
- Hangul: 민락역
- Hanja: 民樂驛
- Revised Romanization: Minrak yeok
- McCune–Reischauer: Minrak yŏk

General information
- Location: Suyeong-dong, Suyeong District, Busan; South Korea
- Coordinates: 35.1674°N 129.1217°E
- Operator: Busan Transportation Corporation
- Line: Busan Metro Line 2
- Platforms: 2
- Tracks: 2

Construction
- Structure type: Underground

Other information
- Station code: 207

History
- Opened: August 29, 2002; 24 years ago
Location

Millak Station (Korean: 민락역; Hanja: 民樂驛) is a station on the Busan Metro Line 2 in Suyeong-dong, Suyeong District, Busan, South Korea.

Preceding station	Busan Metro	Following station
Centum City towards Jangsan	Line 2	Suyeong towards Yangsan
