= Wuchuan Gelao and Miao Autonomous County =

Wuchuan County 务川县 Wuchwan
- Autonomous county
- 务川仡佬族苗族自治县; Wuchuan Gelao and Miao Autonomous County
- Location of the seat in Guizhou Wuchuan (Southwest China)
- Coordinates (Wuchuan County government): 28°33′46″N 107°53′58″E
- Country: China
- Province: Guizhou
- Prefecture-level city: Zunyi
- County seat: Duru Subdistrict

Area
  - Total: 2,777.59 km^{2} (1,072.43 sq mi)

Population (2020 census)
  - Total: 308,466
  - Density: 111.055/km^{2} (287.632/sq mi)
- Time zone: UTC+8 (China Standard)
- Website: www.gzwuchuan.gov.cn

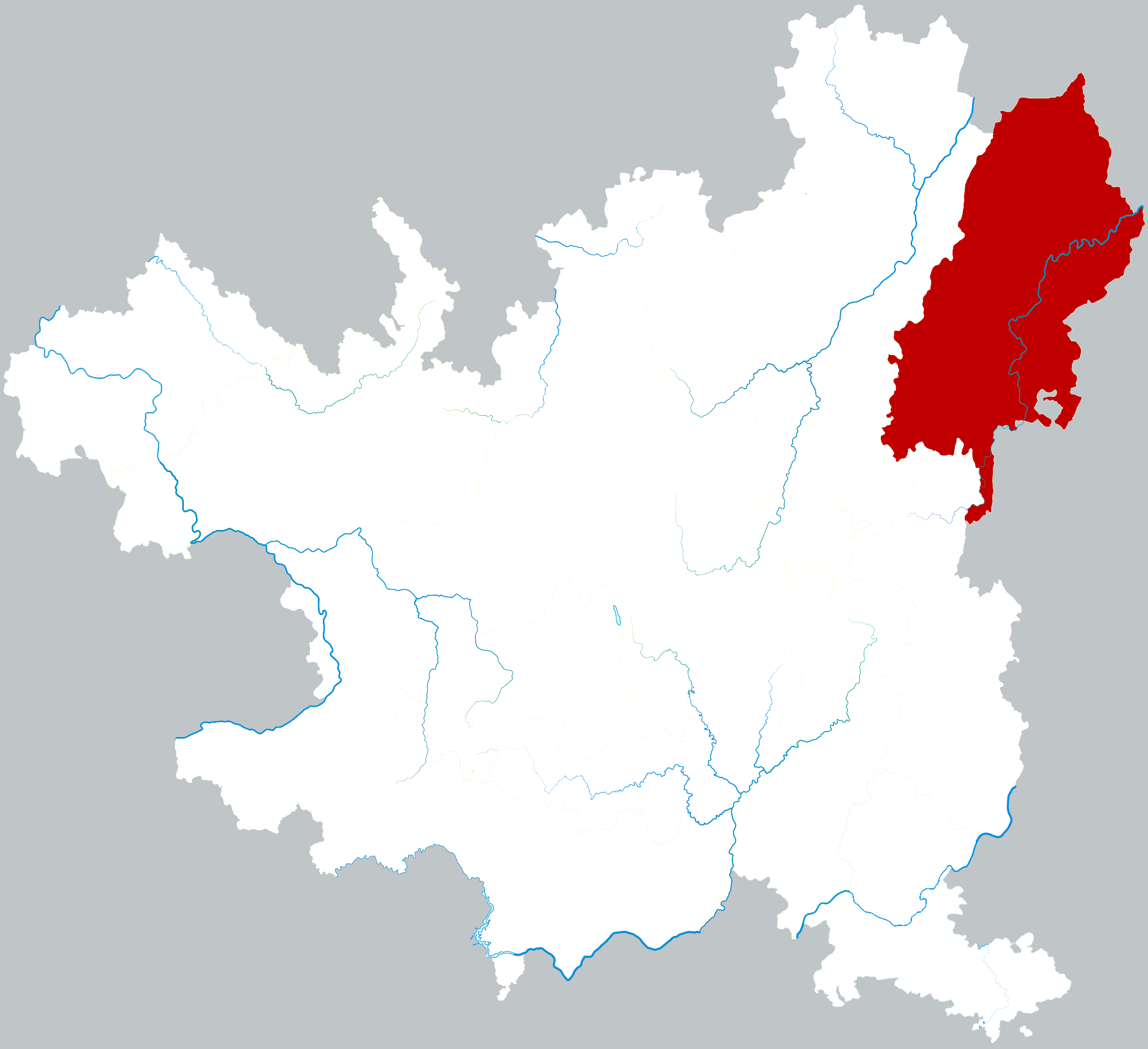
Location of Wuchuan Gelao and Miao Autonomous County in Zunyi city, China.

Wuchuan Gelao and Miao Autonomous County (simplified Chinese: 务川仡佬族苗族自治县; traditional Chinese: 務川仡佬族苗族自治縣; pinyin: Wùchuān Gēlǎozú Miáozú Zìzhìxiàn; alternatively 婺川) is a county in the northeast of Guizhou province, China, bordering Chongqing to the north. It is under the administration of Zunyi city.

== Administrative divisions ==
Wuchuan is divided into 3 subdistricts, 11 towns, and 2 townships:

- Duru Subdistrict (都濡街道)
- Dansha Subdistrict (丹砂街道)
- Daping Subdistrict (大坪街道)
- Fengle Town (丰乐镇)
- Huangdu Town (黄都镇)
- Fuyang Town (涪洋镇)
- Zhennan Town (镇南镇)
- Yanshan Town (砚山镇)
- Zhuoshui Town (濯水镇)
- Maotian Town (茅天镇)
- Baicun Town (柏村镇)
- Nigao Town (泥高镇)
- Fenshui Town (分水镇)
- Jiaoba Town (蕉坝镇)
- Hongsi Township (红丝乡)
- Shichao Township (石朝乡)

== Climate ==
Climate data for Wuchuan, elevation 660 m (2,170 ft), (1991–2020 normals, extremes 1981–2010)
Month	Jan	Feb	Mar	Apr	May	Jun	Jul	Aug	Sep	Oct	Nov	Dec	Year
Record high °C (°F)	22.8 (73.0)	30.0 (86.0)	32.8 (91.0)	33.2 (91.8)	35.5 (95.9)	35.7 (96.3)	38.6 (101.5)	38.7 (101.7)	38.7 (101.7)	33.1 (91.6)	28.2 (82.8)	20.1 (68.2)	38.7 (101.7)
Mean daily maximum °C (°F)	8.2 (46.8)	10.7 (51.3)	15.6 (60.1)	21.2 (70.2)	25.1 (77.2)	27.8 (82.0)	31.1 (88.0)	31.5 (88.7)	27.0 (80.6)	20.7 (69.3)	15.9 (60.6)	10.2 (50.4)	20.4 (68.8)
Daily mean °C (°F)	5.2 (41.4)	7.2 (45.0)	11.3 (52.3)	16.4 (61.5)	20.2 (68.4)	23.3 (73.9)	26.1 (79.0)	25.8 (78.4)	22.1 (71.8)	16.7 (62.1)	12.1 (53.8)	7.0 (44.6)	16.1 (61.0)
Mean daily minimum °C (°F)	3.2 (37.8)	4.9 (40.8)	8.5 (47.3)	13.1 (55.6)	16.9 (62.4)	20.3 (68.5)	22.6 (72.7)	22.1 (71.8)	18.9 (66.0)	14.3 (57.7)	9.7 (49.5)	4.9 (40.8)	13.3 (55.9)
Record low °C (°F)	−3.5 (25.7)	−3.0 (26.6)	−2.0 (28.4)	3.6 (38.5)	9.1 (48.4)	12.8 (55.0)	14.8 (58.6)	15.5 (59.9)	11.7 (53.1)	5.1 (41.2)	−0.9 (30.4)	−4.0 (24.8)	−4.0 (24.8)
Average precipitation mm (inches)	25.7 (1.01)	26.4 (1.04)	52.0 (2.05)	105.9 (4.17)	169.6 (6.68)	227.3 (8.95)	165.6 (6.52)	150.2 (5.91)	105.5 (4.15)	105.1 (4.14)	51.2 (2.02)	19.3 (0.76)	1,203.8 (47.4)
Average precipitation days (≥ 0.1 mm)	13.1	12.5	15.3	16.7	18.0	17.1	13.8	12.4	11.6	16.5	12.9	11.4	171.3
Average snowy days	3.3	1.3	0.3	0	0	0	0	0	0	0	0	1.1	6
Average relative humidity (%)	79	78	77	78	79	82	78	76	79	84	82	79	79
Mean monthly sunshine hours	29.2	31.5	57.8	79.9	93.1	87.4	150.8	167.9	108.9	63.5	56.0	35.5	961.5
Percentage possible sunshine	9	10	15	21	22	21	36	42	30	18	17	11	21
Source: China Meteorological Administration
