= Dongbaek station (Busan Metro) =

Station of the Busan Metro

204 동백 Dongbaek
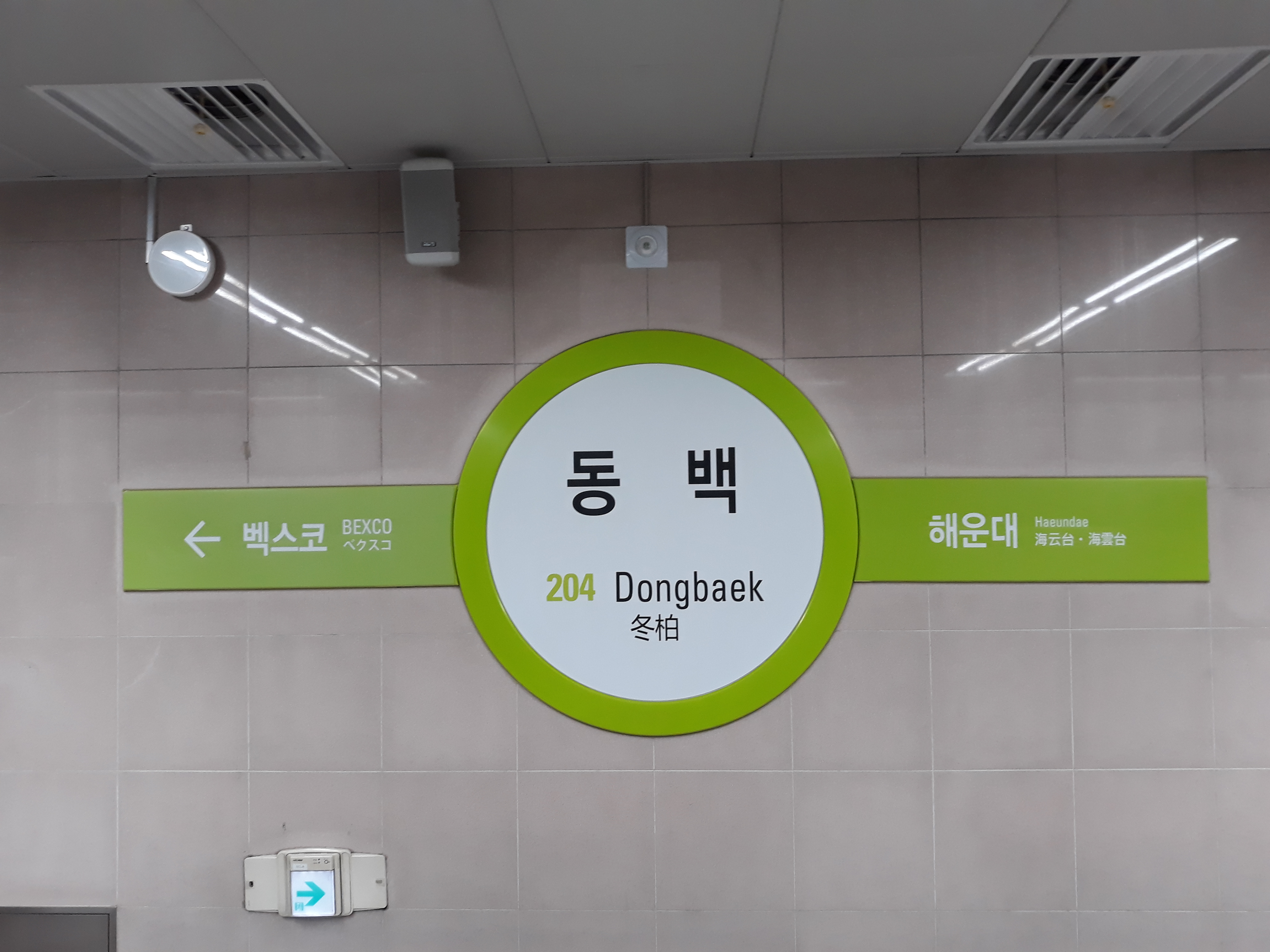

Korean name
- Hangul: 동백역
- Hanja: 冬柏驛
- Revised Romanization: Dongbaek-yeok
- McCune–Reischauer: Tongbaek-yŏk

General information
- Location: U-dong, Haeundae District, Busan; South Korea
- Coordinates: 35.1613°N 129.1481°E
- Operator: Busan Transportation Corporation
- Line: Busan Metro Line 2
- Platforms: 2
- Tracks: 2

Construction
- Structure type: Underground

Other information
- Station code: 204

History
- Opened: August 29, 2002; 24 years ago
Location

Dongbaek station (Korean: 동백역) is a station on the Busan Metro Line 2 in U-dong, Haeundae District, Busan, South Korea. The station is located near the Dongbaekseom Island.

Preceding station	Busan Metro	Following station
Haeundae towards Jangsan	Line 2	BEXCO towards Yangsan
