= Dongbaek station (Yongin) =

Metro station in Yongin, South Korea

Y114 동백 (용인세브란스병원) Dongbaek (Yongin Severance Hospital)
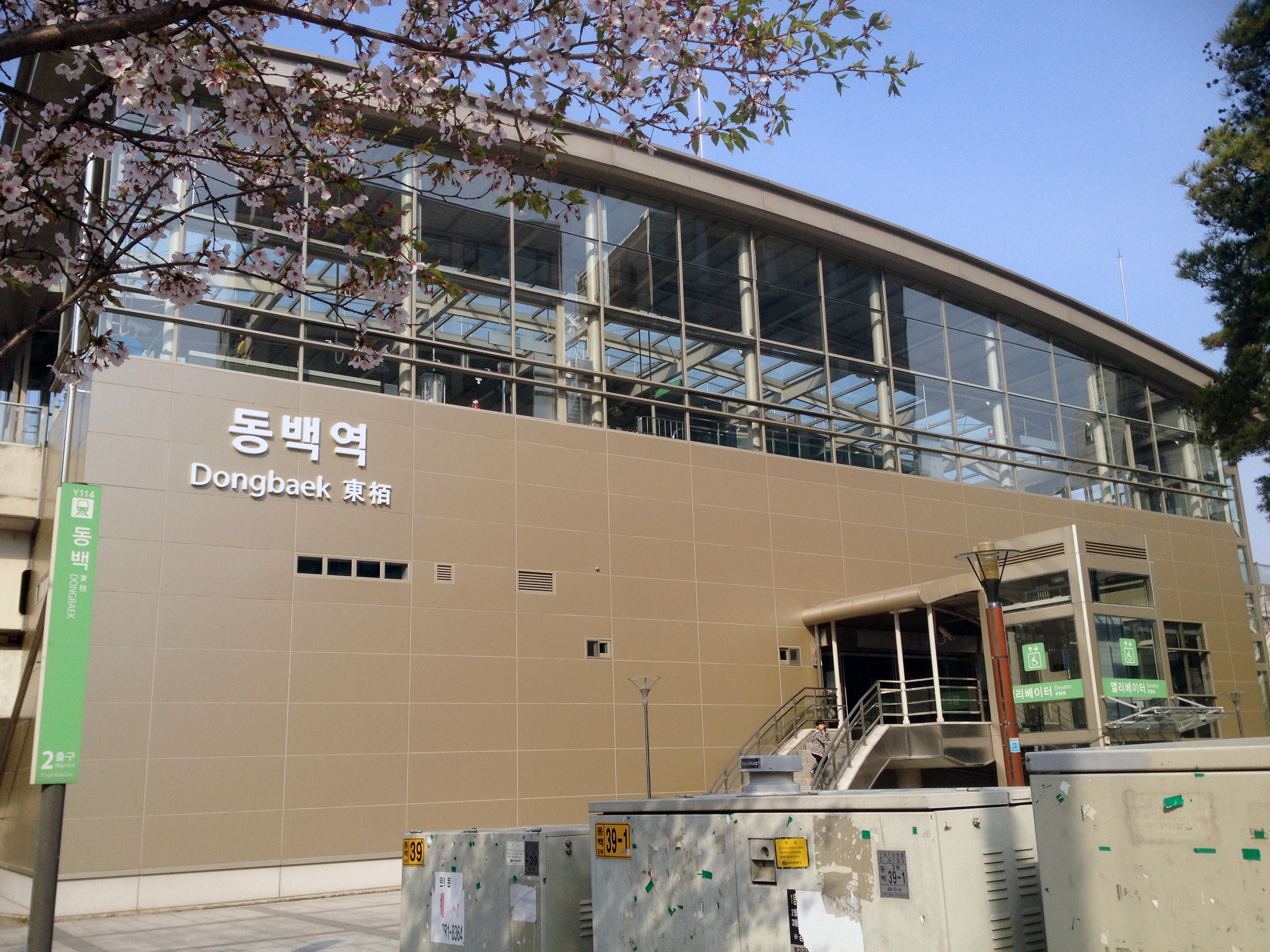

Korean name
- Hangul: 동백역
- Hanja: 東栢驛
- Revised Romanization: Dongbaengnyeok
- McCune–Reischauer: Tongbaengnyŏk

General information
- Location: Jung-dong, Giheung-gu, Yongin
- Coordinates: 37.2691°N 127.1528°E
- Operator: Yongin EverLine Co,. Ltd. Neo Trans
- Line: EverLine
- Platforms: 2
- Tracks: 2

Key dates
- April 26, 2013: EverLine opened
Location

Dongbaek Station (Korean: 동백역) is a station of the Everline in Jung-dong, Giheung District, Yongin, South Korea.

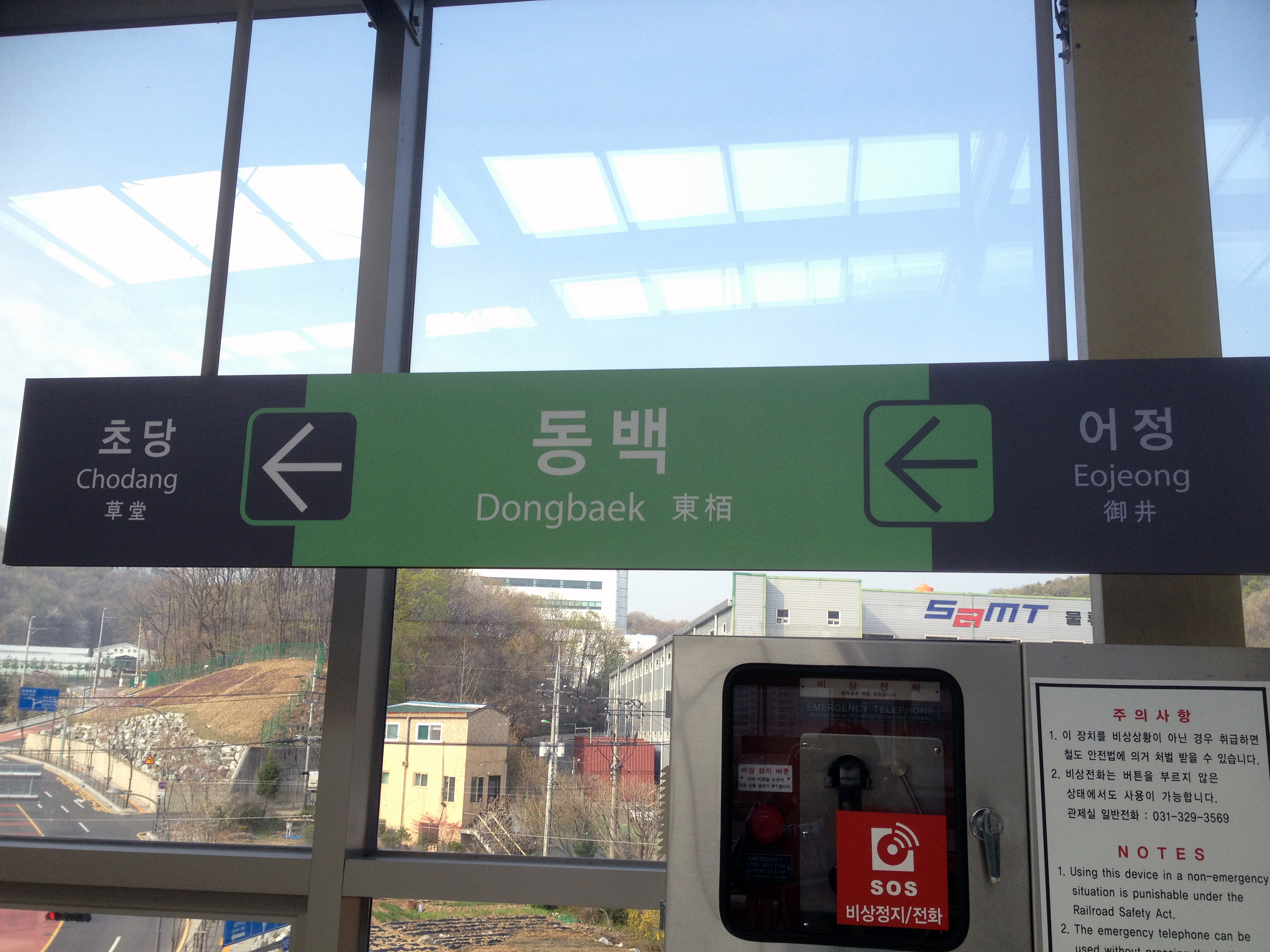

Preceding station	Seoul Metropolitan Subway	Following station
Eojeong towards Giheung	EverLine	Chodang towards Jeondae–Everland
