= Fuyang, Sichuan =

Fuyang 涪阳镇
- Town
- Location in Sichuan
- Coordinates: 32°3′30″N 107°9′49″E
- Country: People's Republic of China
- Province: Sichuan
- Prefecture-level city: Bazhong
- County: Tongjiang County
- Time zone: UTC+8 (China Standard)

Fuyang (simplified Chinese: 涪阳; traditional Chinese: 涪陽; pinyin: Fúyáng) is a town under the administration of Tongjiang County, Sichuan, China. As of 2020, it administers Fuyangba Residential Community (涪阳坝社区) and the following ten villages:

- Hongjiang Village (红江村)
- Jinjiaping Village (金家坪村)
- Xiajiangkou Village (下江口村)
- Shilongsi Village (石龙寺村)
- Xietanhe Village (斜滩河村)
- Zhongmatou Village (中码头村)
- Huoshuigou Village (活水沟村)
- Jiahezhai Village (嘉禾寨村)
- Chengziping Village (城子坪村)
- Wuxuetang Village (武学堂村)
