= Fuyang, Guizhou =

Fuyang 涪洋镇
- Town
- Location within Guizhou Location within China
- Coordinates: 28°31′51″N 107°44′24″E
- Country: People's Republic of China
- Province: Guizhou
- Prefecture-level city: Zunyi
- Autonomous county: Wuchuan Gelao and Miao Autonomous County
- Time zone: UTC+8 (China Standard)

Fuyang (Chinese: 涪洋; pinyin: Fúyáng) is a town under the administration of Wuchuan Gelao and Miao Autonomous County, Guizhou, China. As of 2020, it administers the following two residential neighborhoods and seven villages:

Neighborhoods

- Fuyang Community
- Dangyang Community (当阳社区)

Villages

- Xiaping Village (小坪村)
- Shuiba Village (水坝村)
- Yonghe Village (永和村)
- Qianjin Village (前进村)
- Heping Village (和平村)
- Shuanghe Village (双河村)
- Zhenzhu Village (珍珠村)

== See also ==
- List of township-level divisions of Guizhou
