= Fuyang, Guangdong =

Fuyang 浮洋镇
- Town
- Location in Guangdong
- Coordinates: 23°35′14″N 116°35′45″E
- Country: China
- Province: Guangdong
- Prefecture-level city: Chaozhou
- District: Chao'an

Area
  - Total: 38.5 km^{2} (14.9 sq mi)

Population
  - Total: 97,000
  - Density: 2,500/km^{2} (6,500/sq mi)
- Time zone: UTC+8 (China Standard)
- Website: fy.chaoan.gov.cn

Fuyang (simplified Chinese: 浮洋镇; traditional Chinese: 浮洋鎮; pinyin: Fúyáng Zhèn) is a town under the administration of and in the south of Chao'an District, Chaozhou, Guangdong, China, located south-southwest of downtown Chaozhou. Fuyang has an area of 38.5 square kilometers and a population of 97,000. As of 2018, it has four residential communities and 35 villages under its administration.

== Administrative divisions ==
The town has jurisdiction over the following subareas:

Yongda Community, Heping Community, Shengli Community, Zhongxing Community, Xulong Village, Longmei Village, Xianting Village, Donglong Village, Dongbian Village, Anhou Village, Xialimei Village, Hongxiang Village, Douwen Village, Jingli Village, Taolilong Village, Leqiao Village, Shenyang Village, Huagong Village, Liucuo Village, Panwu Village, Yancuo Village, Dawu Village, Xin'an Village, Xia Xin'an Village, Fengyi Village, Panliu Village, Gaoyi Village, Dongxiang Village, Linquan Village, Cao'an Village, Fudong Village, Wuyang Village, Xijiao Village, Qiaohu Village, Xinfeng Village, Sansheng Village, Weiluo Village, Shenglian Village and Mujing Village.
