= Chao'an, Chaozhou =

Coordinates: 23.7228°N 116.519°E

Chao'an 潮安区 Chaoan
- District
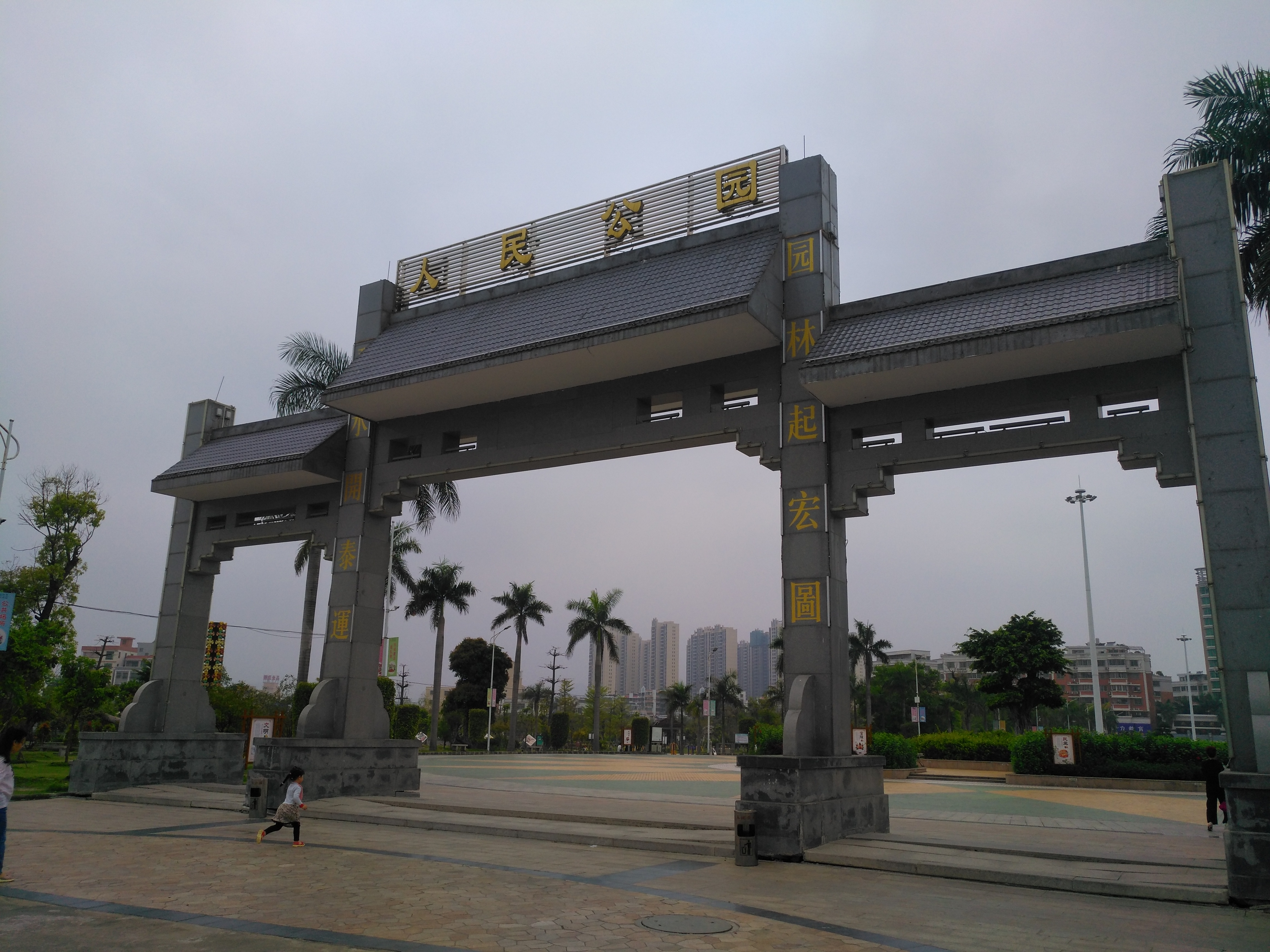
- Interactive map of Chao'an
- Country: People's Republic of China
- Province: Guangdong
- Prefecture-level city: Chaozhou

Area
  - District: 1,231 km^{2} (475 sq mi)

Population (2020)
  - District: 1,175,150
  - Density: 954.6/km^{2} (2,472/sq mi)
  - Urban: 748,260
  - Rural: 426,890
- Time zone: UTC+8 (China Standard)
- Website: www.chaoan.gov.cn

Chao'an (the former county)
- Chinese: 潮安
- Postal: Chaoan
Transcriptions
Standard Mandarin
- Hanyu Pinyin: Cháo'ān
- Wade–Giles: Ch'ao^{2}-an^{1}

Haiyang
- Traditional Chinese: 海陽
- Simplified Chinese: 海阳
- Postal: Haiyang
Transcriptions
Standard Mandarin
- Hanyu Pinyin: Hǎiyáng
- Wade–Giles: Hai^{3}-yang^{2}

Chao'an (Chinese: 潮安; pinyin: Cháo'ān) is a district of Chaozhou City in eastern Guangdong Province in Southern China. It was Chao'an County until June 2013, when it became a district of Chaozhou. The former county was known as 'Haiyang' until 1914.

It has an area of 1,238.77 km^{2} (478.29 sq mi) and a population of 1,175,150 (2020 census). It is under the jurisdiction of Chaozhou prefecture-level city.

== Administrative divisions ==
- Anbu (庵埠镇)
- Caitang (彩塘镇)
- Chifeng (赤凤镇)
- Dengtang (登塘镇)
- Dongfeng (东凤镇)
- Fenghuang (凤凰镇)
- Fengtang (凤塘镇)
- Fengxi Town, Chaozhou (枫溪镇)
- Fuyang (浮洋镇)
- Guihu (归湖镇)
- Guxiang (古巷镇)
- Jiangdong (江东镇)
- Jinshi (金石镇)
- Longhu (龙湖镇)
- Shaxi (沙溪镇)
- Wanfeng Forestry (万峰林场)
- Wenci (文祠镇)

== Heritage Sites ==
=== Chongxi Ancestral Hall ===
The Chongxi Ancestral Hall (從熙公祠) is located at Xiejiaotou in the Jinsha Administrative Area of Caitang Town (彩塘鎮), Chao’an County. It was built by Tan Hock Nien (陳旭年), a community leader of the Johor state Chinese diaspora in Malaysia. Construction began in the ninth year of the Tongzhi reign (同治九年, 1870 AD) and was completed in the ninth year of the Guangxu reign (光緒九年, 1884 AD), taking a total of fourteen years.

=== Tomb of Lu Tong ===
The Tomb of Lu Tong is a Song‑dynasty burial site discovered in Chao’an District, Chaozhou City, located at what is now the government seat of Dengtang Town. The tomb is monumental in scale and of exceptionally high status. A stone stele, taller than a person, once stood before a mound shaped like a Mongol helmet, and in front of the mound stretched a ceremonial ground large enough for several hundred people to perform ancestral rites. On both sides of the tomb field stood stone sheep, stone horses, and stone guardian figures. Several hundred meters away, a memorial archway marked the beginning of the tomb path. Local residents referred to this burial site as 'Clouds Covering the Moon' (雲蓋月). Although the landscape has shifted over time and the stone sheep, horses, and guardians have disappeared, one can still trace the outlines of its former layout and imagine the vast scale of this ancient tomb in its original state.

=== Longhu Ancient Village ===
Longhu Ancient Village (龍湖古寨), located in Longhu Town, Chaozhou City, Guangdong Province, China, is a provincial-level cultural relic protection unit in Chaoan County, Chaozhou City. It is classified as an ancient building and was officially designated in April 2006.

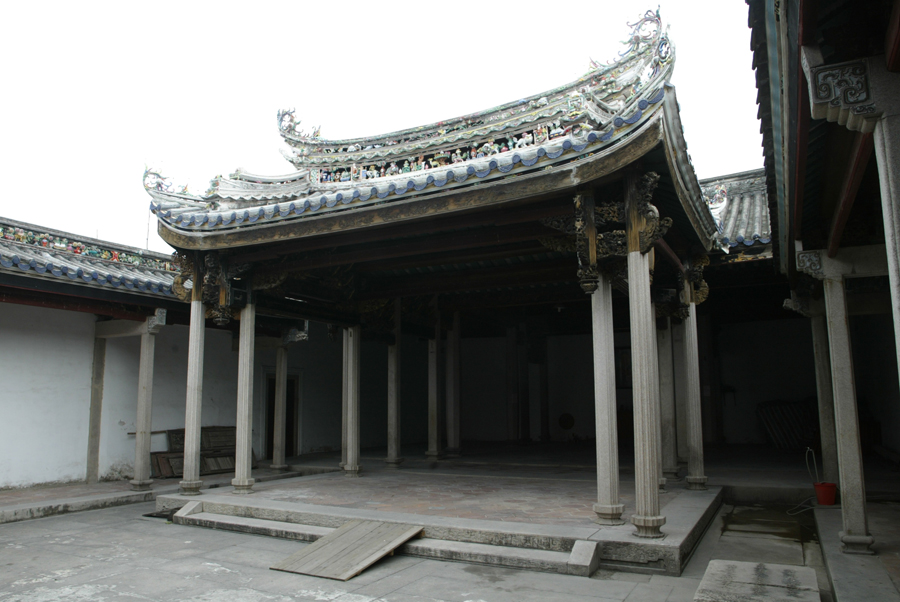
The Chongxi Ancestral Hall

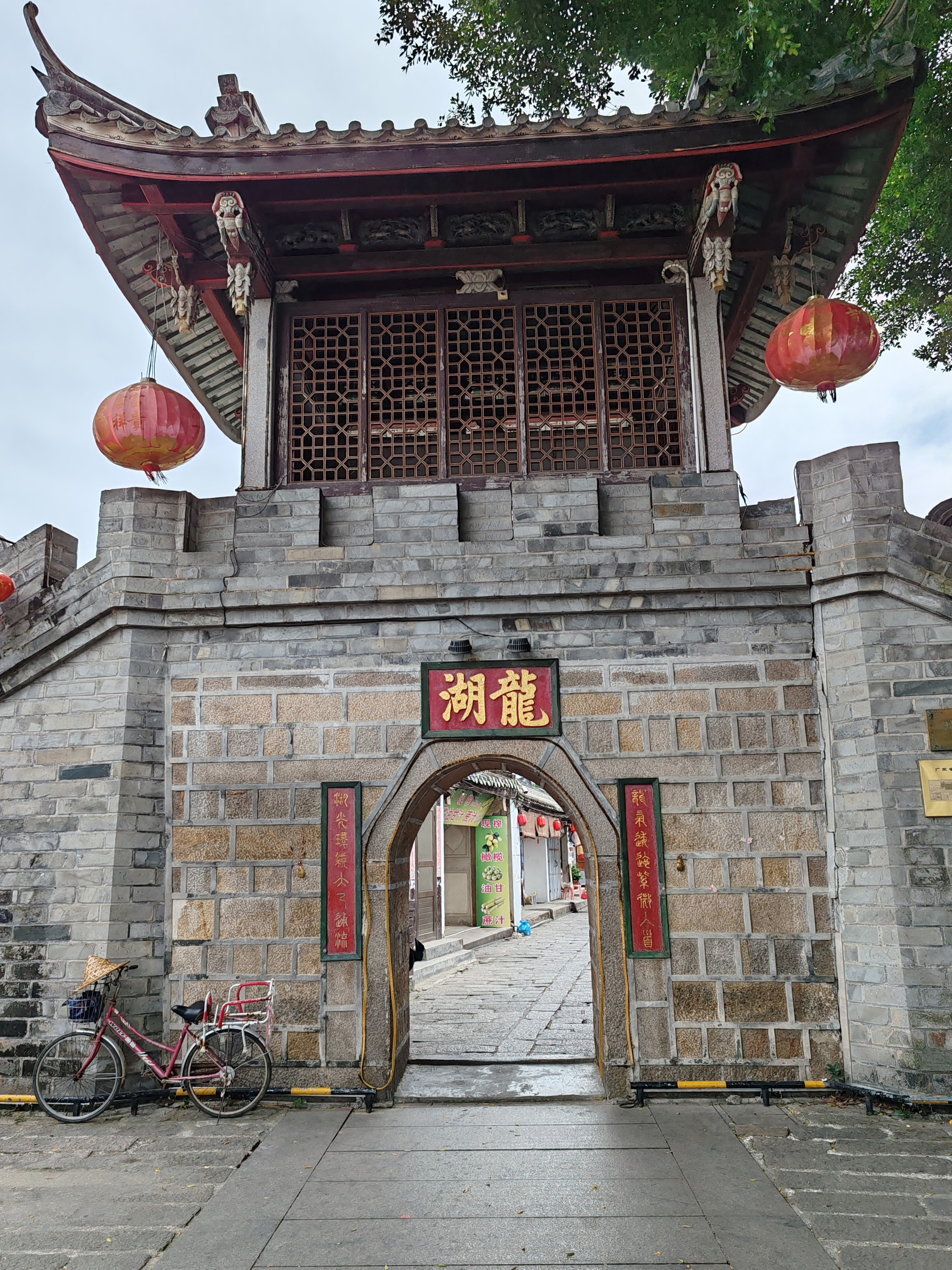
Longhu Ancient Village

== Notable people ==
- Da-Wen Sun
- Jao Tsung-I
- Li Ka Shing
- Stefanie Sun
- Tchan Fou-li
- George Yeo

== See also ==
- Chaoshan
