= Haeundae station =

Metro station in Busan, South Korea

203 해운대 (해운대부민병원) Haeundae (Haeundae Bumin Hospital)
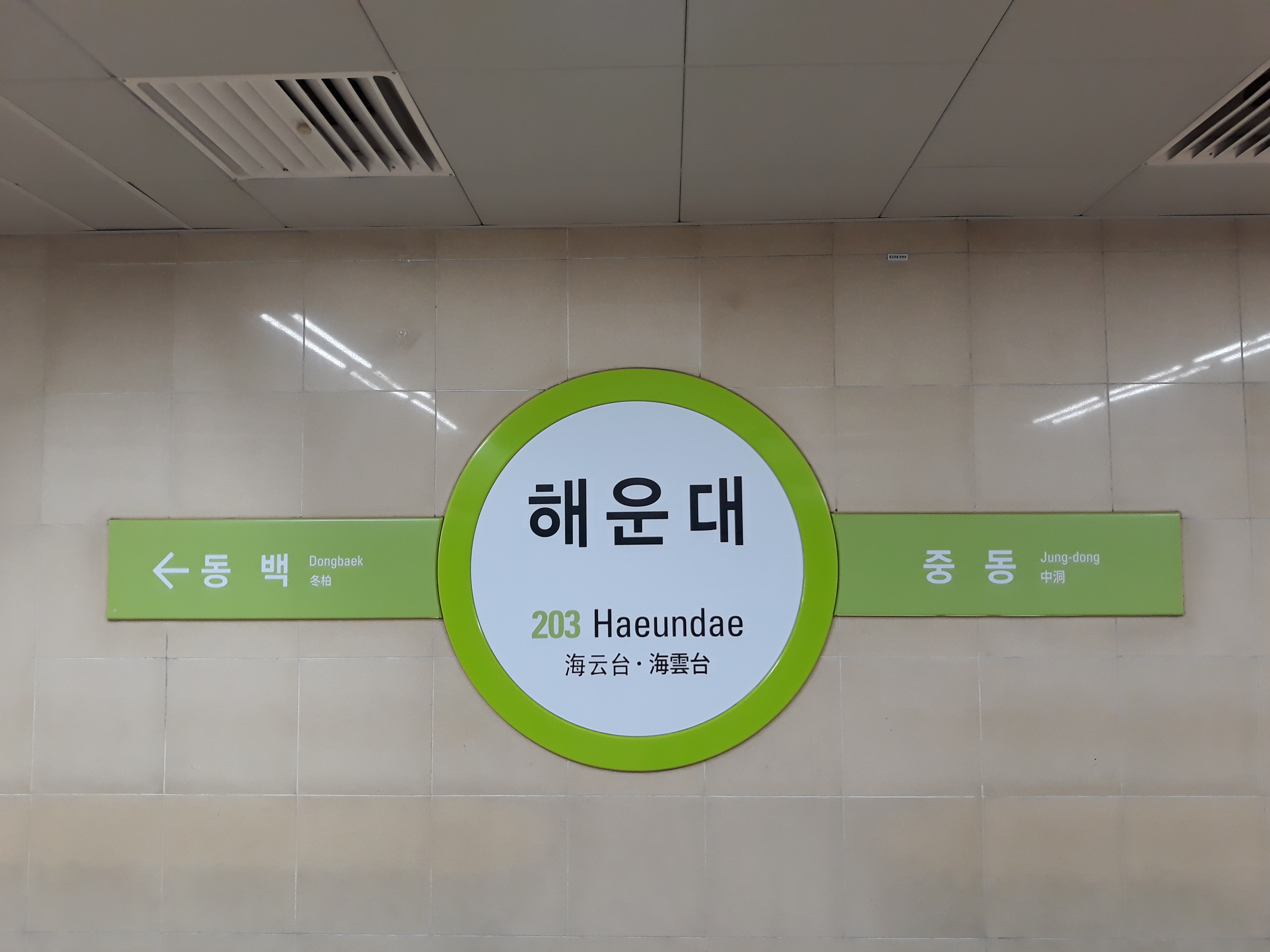

Korean name
- Hangul: 해운대역
- Hanja: 海雲臺驛
- Revised Romanization: Haeundae-yeok
- McCune–Reischauer: Haeundae-yŏk

General information
- Location: U-dong, Haeundae District, Busan; South Korea
- Coordinates: 35.1637°N 129.1589°E
- Operator: Busan Transportation Corporation
- Line: Busan Metro Line 2
- Platforms: 2
- Tracks: 2

Construction
- Structure type: Underground

Other information
- Station code: 203

History
- Opened: August 29, 2002; 24 years ago
Location

Haeundae station (Korean: 해운대역) is a station on the Busan Metro Line 2 in U-dong, Haeundae District, Busan, South Korea. The station is unrelated to the Sinhaeundae station operated by Korail.

Preceding station	Busan Metro	Following station
Jung-dong towards Jangsan	Line 2	Dongbaek towards Yangsan
