= Jiangdong, Chao'an County =

Jiangdong 江东镇
- Town
- Location of Jiangdong in Guangdong
- Coordinates: 23°35′05″N 116°39′09″E
- Country: China
- Province: Guangdong
- Prefecture-level city: Chaozhou
- District: Chao'an District

Area
  - Total: 38 km^{2} (15 sq mi)

Population (2008)
  - Total: 72,205
  - Density: 1,900/km^{2} (4,900/sq mi)

Jiangdong (simplified Chinese: 江东镇; traditional Chinese: 江東鎮; pinyin: Jiāngdōng Zhèn,) is a town located in Chao'an District, Chaozhou, in eastern Guangdong province, China. The town is located on an island surrounded by the water of the Han River, and enjoys a humid climate. As a result, it is nicknamed "Xizhong" (Chinese: 溪中; pinyin: Xīzhōng; lit. 'in the middle of the stream'). The town is largely agrarian, and is known for food products. It is also the home of Zhenmei Food Group Company.

Jiangdong has an area of 38 square kilometres (15 mi^{2}), and a population of 72,205 as of 2008.

== History ==
In 1958, the Jiangdong People's Commune (Chinese: 江东公社) was established. In 1983, the status of people's commune was revoked, and Jiandong briefly became a county-governed district (Chinese: 县辖区). This status was revoked in 1987, when it became a town, which it remains today.

== Geography ==
Jiangdong is located in the southeast of Chao'an District, in Chaozhou, Guangdong province, 12 kilometres (7.5 mi) from the district's center. The town is situated on an island in the lower reaches of the Han River, and is commonly known as "Xizhong" (Chinese: 溪中; pinyin: Xīzhōng; lit. 'in the middle of the stream').

The town is also close to Chenghai District and the Shantou Special Economic Zone.

== Administrative divisions ==
Jiangdong administers 1 residential community (Chinese: 社区) and 29 administrative villages (Chinese: 行政村). In addition, Zhengdong contains 48 natural villages (Chinese: 自然村), which hold no administrative jurisdiction. The town's government is located in Zhongzhuang Village (Chinese: 中庄村).

The town's sole residential community is Jiangdong North Street Community (Chinese: 江东北街社区).

The town's administrative villages are as follows:

- Shangshuitou Village (Chinese: 上水头村)
- Xiashuitou Village (Chinese: 下水头村)
- Youhang Village (Chinese: 柚杭村)
- Youyuan Village (Chinese: 柚园村)
- Yuanxiang Village (Chinese: 元巷村)
- Tingtou Village (Chinese: 亭头村)
- Cuntou Village (Chinese: 村头村)
- Zhoudong Village (Chinese: 洲东村)
- Yangguang Village (Chinese: 洋光村)
- Xianpingtian Village (Chinese: 仙坪田村)
- Dongguang Village (Chinese: 东光村)
- Sanwu Village (Chinese: 三吴村)
- Dushu Village (Chinese: 独树村)
- Shangzhuang Village (Chinese: 上庄村)
- Zhongzhuang Village (Chinese: 中庄村)
- Xiazhuang Village (Chinese: 下庄村)
- Jingmei Village (Chinese: 井美村)
- Yuanshan Village (Chinese: 圆山村)
- Longkou Village (Chinese: 龙口村)
- Hongsha Village (Chinese: 红砂村)
- Xianzhou Village (Chinese: 仙洲村)
- Dutou Village (Chinese: 渡头村)
- Zhangcuozhou Village (Chinese: 樟厝洲村)
- Xiedu Village (Chinese: 谢渡村)
- Xiqianxi Village (Chinese: 西前溪村)
- Dongqianxi Village (Chinese: 东前溪村)
- Pengdong Village (Chinese: 蓬洞村)
- Shecuozhou Village (Chinese: 佘厝洲村)
- Xiahu Village (Chinese: 下湖村)

== Demographics ==
Jiangdong had a population of 72,205 as of 2008, up from the 2000 Chinese Census, where Jiangdong had a recorded population of 66,145. A 1996 estimate of Jiangdong's population put the total figure at about 67,000.

Approximately 30,000 overseas Chinese hail from Jiangdong, most of whom live in Hong Kong, Macau, and Taiwan.

== Economy ==
Jiangdong's economy is notably for its relative absence of heavy industry. Instead, much of the town's economy is focused around agriculture, light industry, and various services.

=== Agriculture ===
Jiangdong has a large agricultural sector, with major crops including sugarcane, peanuts, bamboo shoots, daikon radishes, bananas, oranges, and miscellaneous vegetables. 22,400 mu of Jiangdong is farmland. Beginning in the late 1990s, Jiangdong served as an agricultural research center, and during the early 2000s, the town government improved the town's water and electrical infrastructure to further the town's agricultural research.

==== Climate ====
Jiangdong, located in the downstream of Han River, has fertile soil sources and abundant water. The town's climate is conducive to agriculture.

According to the topography of the whole town, Jiangdong town is divided into two parts, the south part and the north part. Most of the soils in the north part belong to property of sediment. On the contrary, the cultivated land of the south part is more likely to be clay. After all the town is so small that it does not cause many difference between them. Generally speaking, most of the crops are the same between these two parts.

==== Local products ====
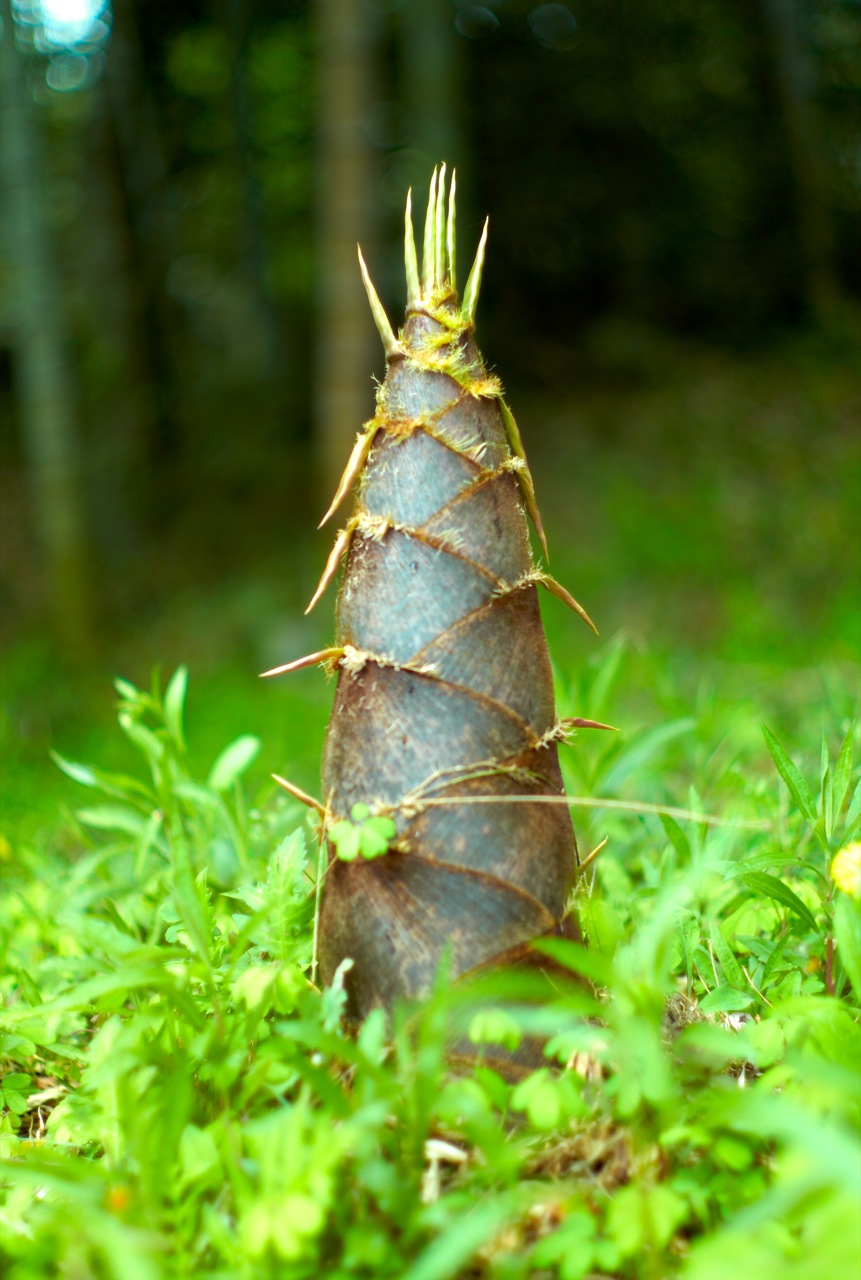
Big Bamboo Shoot

Jiangdong is well known for its bamboo shoots. The town is fit for growing bamboo shoots, as there is enough water, fertile soil, and a climate for doing so. Bamboo shoots from Jiangdong are reputed for their fresh meat, nice smell and sweet taste. In Chaozhou, Jiangdong is well known for the bamboo shoots, and Pengdong Village is one of the largest area in Jiangdong for planting bamboo shoots. The village has been planting bamboo shoots for at least several decades. It is said that there is more than households among the whole 600 households planting bamboo shoots. In recent years, this village changed its way from developing sporadic planting to large-scale cultivating, improving the total yield of bamboo shoots, and their economics benefits.

Dried turnip is also one of the famous food products of Jiangdong. In the Chaoshan area, southern Fujian, Taiwan, Meizhou, Fengshun County and other regions are called the radish dry salted. Furthermore, together with fish sauce and pickle, these three are the most famous cuisine in Chaoshan.

=== Industry ===
==== Light industry ====
Due to Jiangdong's size and location, the town has developed light industry rather than the heavy industry. Light industries in Jiangdong include embroidery, clothing, handicrafts, building materials, electrical appliances, and ceramics. The island is without major industrial pollution.

==== Zhenmei Food Group ====
Guangdong Zhenmei Food Group, officially known as Guangdong Zhenmei Food Group Co., Ltd., is headquartered in Jiangdong. Founded in 1991, Zhenmei Food Group produces various Chinese meat and seafood products. The company is also engaged in scientific research, animal breeding, and food processing. The company has registered capital of 33 million yuan, and existing fixed assets of 150 million Yuan. The Group has three affiliated companies, two research centers, one provincial-level agricultural science and technology innovation center, and four production plants. Generally speaking, its products are export-oriented and are mainly sold to Hong Kong, Singapore, and other southeast Asian regions and countries.

=== Services ===
There are many private transportation service enterprises located in Jiangdong.

== Scenic Areas ==
=== Sanyuan Pagoda ===
Sanyuan Pagoda is located on carp mountain, in Jiangdong. It is also known as the water tower, because it was built on rivers and streams where the water moves quickly. Its construction dates back to 1605, during the Ming dynasty. It is 51 meters high, and has seven floors and eight sides. The base of the tower is made of granite stone. The pagoda is carved with tigers, lions and other animals. The Han River just flows through in front of it, and the tower offers are scenic view of Jiangdong.

== Transportation ==
The town is connected to the mainland via the Jiangdong Bridge (Chinese: 江东大桥), which goes from western portion of the island to the mainland. Major roads in Jiangdong include Dongzhi Road (Chinese: 东直路) and Zhongheng Road (Chinese: 中横路).

Jiangdong is about a 30 minutes drive away from Jieyang Chaoshan Airport and Chaoshan railway station.
