= Kangnam University station =

Metro station in Yongin, South Korea

Y111 강남대 Kangnam Univ.
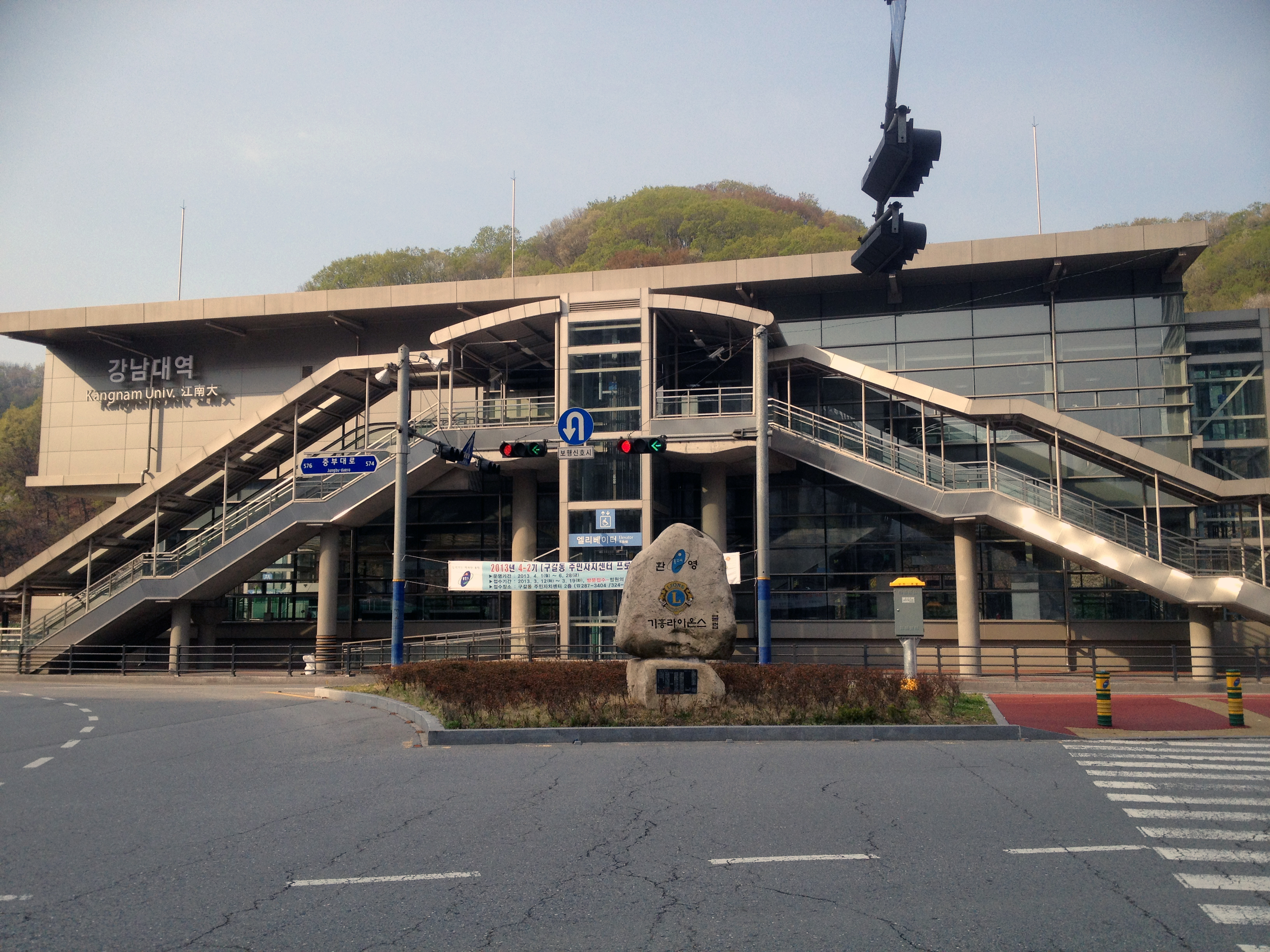

Korean name
- Hangul: 강남대역
- Hanja: 江南大驛
- Revised Romanization: Gangnamdae yeok
- McCune–Reischauer: Kangnamdae yŏk

General information
- Location: Gugal-dong, Giheung-gu, Yongin
- Coordinates: 37.2703°N 127.1261°E
- Operator: Yongin EverLine Co,. Ltd. Neo Trans
- Line: EverLine
- Platforms: 2
- Tracks: 2

Key dates
- April 26, 2013: EverLine opened
Location

Kangnam University Station (Korean: 강남대역; Hanja: 江南大驛) is a station of the Everline in Gugal-dong, Giheung-gu, Yongin, South Korea.

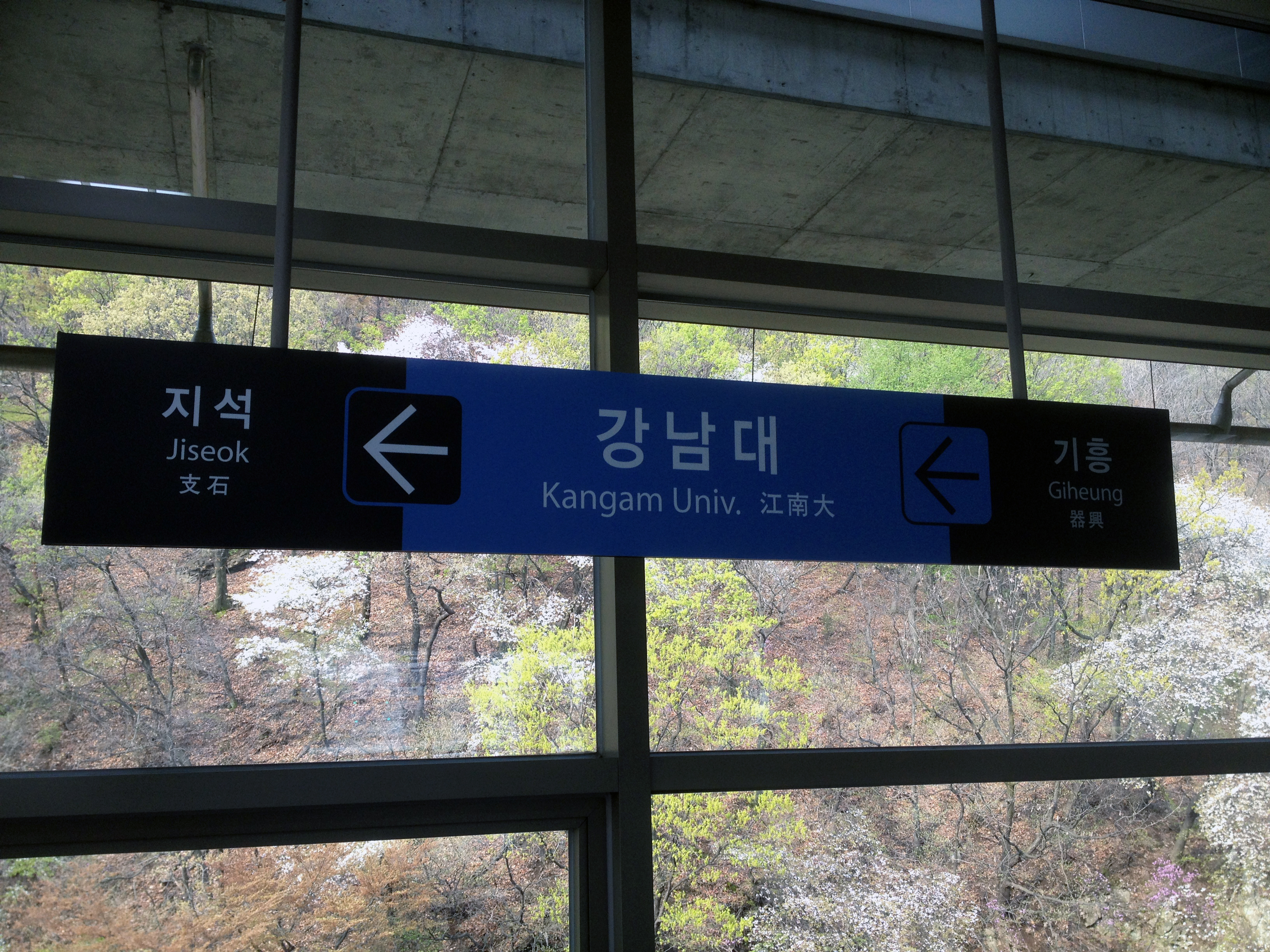

== Nearby attractions ==
- Kangnam University, the station's namesake

Preceding station	Seoul Metropolitan Subway	Following station
Giheung Terminus	EverLine	Jiseok towards Jeondae–Everland
