= Kōnan, Saitama =

Town in Saitama, Japan

Kōnan (江南町, Kōnan-machi) was a town located in Ōsato District, Saitama, Japan.

As of 2003, the town had an estimated population of 13,826 and a density of 605.08 persons per km^{2}. The total area is 22.34 km^{2}.

On February 13, 2007, Kōnan was merged into the expanded city of Kumagaya and no longer exists as an independent municipality.
