= Jiangdong District =

Former district of Ningbo, China

Coordinates: 29°52′0″N 121°34′0″E

Jiangdong District 江东区
- District of the People's Republic of China
- 1949–2016
- Location of Jiangdong in Ningbo
- History
  - Established: 1949
  - Disestablished: 2016
Succeeded by
Yinzhou District, Ningbo
- Today part of: Part of Yinzhou District, Ningbo

Jiangdong District (simplified Chinese: 江东区; traditional Chinese: 江東區; pinyin: Jiāngdōng qū) was a former district of the sub-provincial city of Ningbo in Zhejiang, China.

== Administrative divisions ==
Subdistricts:

- Baizhang Subdistrict (百丈街道), Baihe Subdistrict (白鹤街道), Dongjiao Subdistrict (东郊街道), Dongliu Subdistrict (东柳街道), Dongsheng Subdistrict (东胜街道), Fuming Subdistrict (福明街道), Minglou Subdistrict (明楼街道), Xinming Subdistrict (新明街道)
