= Bopyeong station =

Metro station in Yongin, South Korea

Coordinates: 37.2590°N 127.2186°E

Y122 보평 Bopyeong
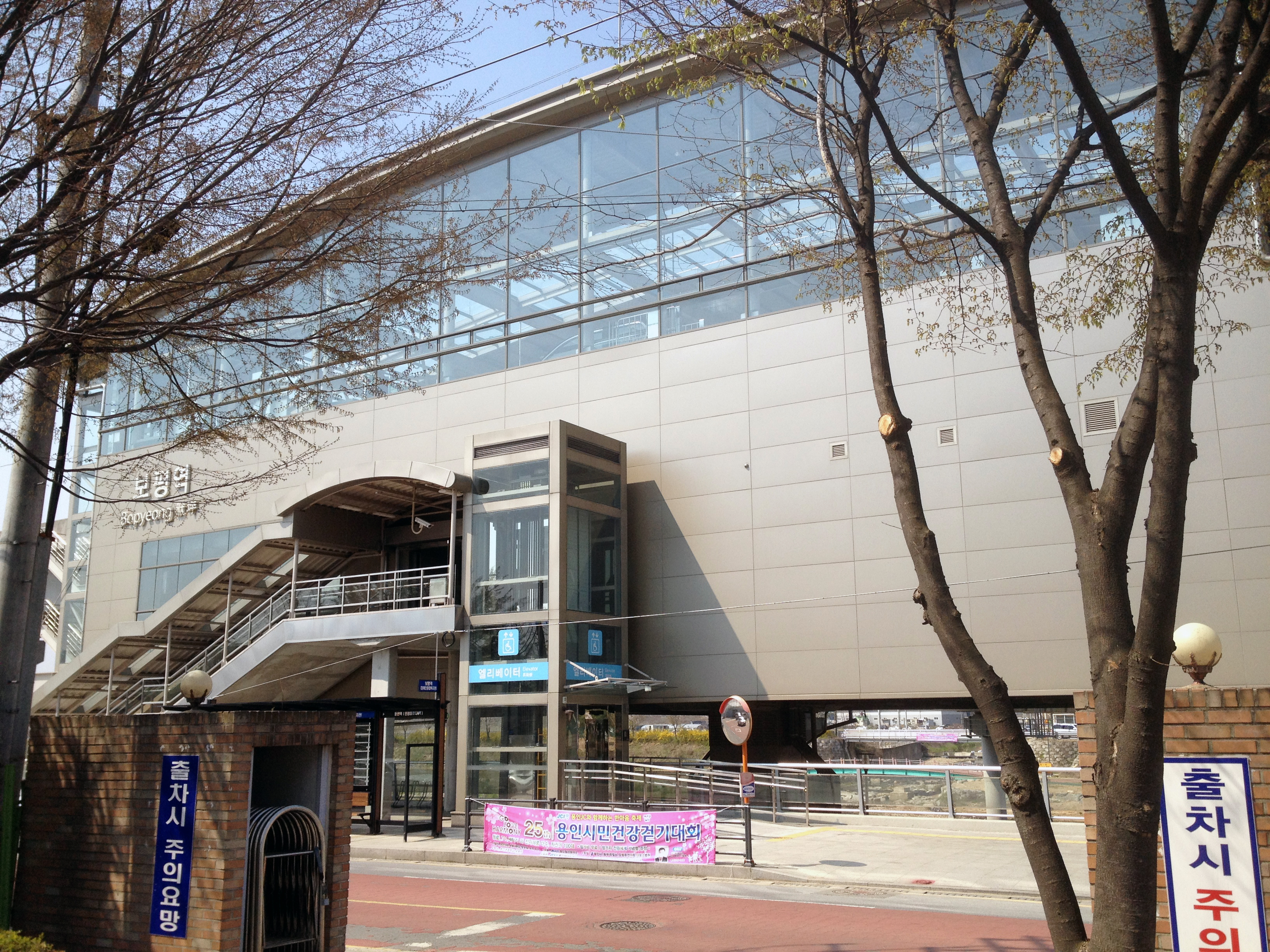

Korean name
- Hangul: 보평역
- Hanja: 洑坪驛
- Revised Romanization: Bopyeong-yeok
- McCune–Reischauer: Pop'yŏng-yŏk

General information
- Location: Yubang-dong, Cheoin-gu, Yongin
- Operator: Yongin EverLine Co,. Ltd. Neo Trans
- Line: EverLine
- Platforms: 2
- Tracks: 2

Key dates
- April 26, 2013: EverLine opened
Location

Bopyeong Station (Korean: 보평역) is a station of the Everline in Yubang-dong, Cheoin District, Yongin, South Korea.

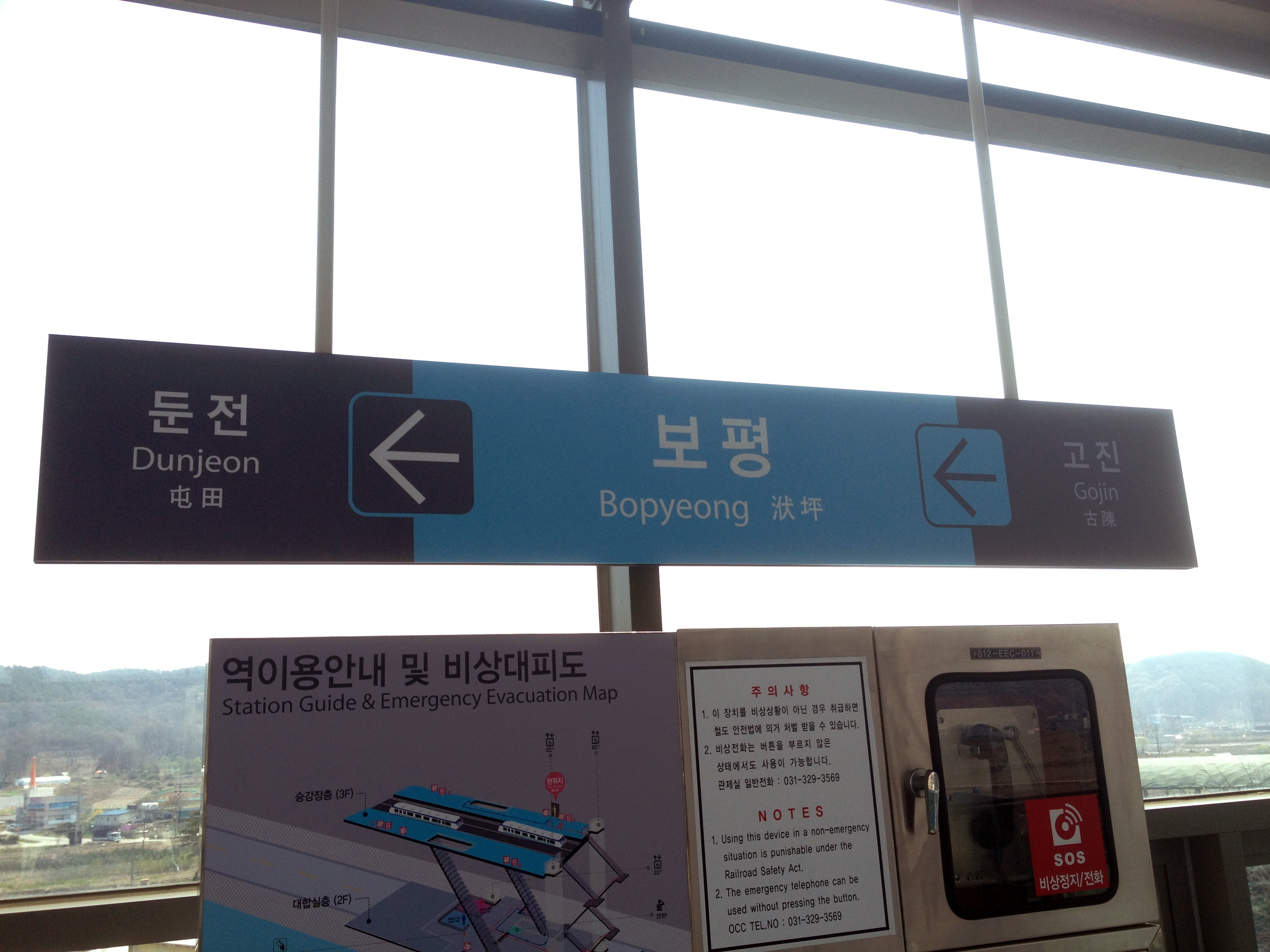

Preceding station	Seoul Metropolitan Subway	Following station
Gojin towards Giheung	EverLine	Dunjeon towards Jeondae–Everland
