= Gimnyangjang station =

Metro station in Yongin, South Korea

Y119 김량장 Gimnyangjang
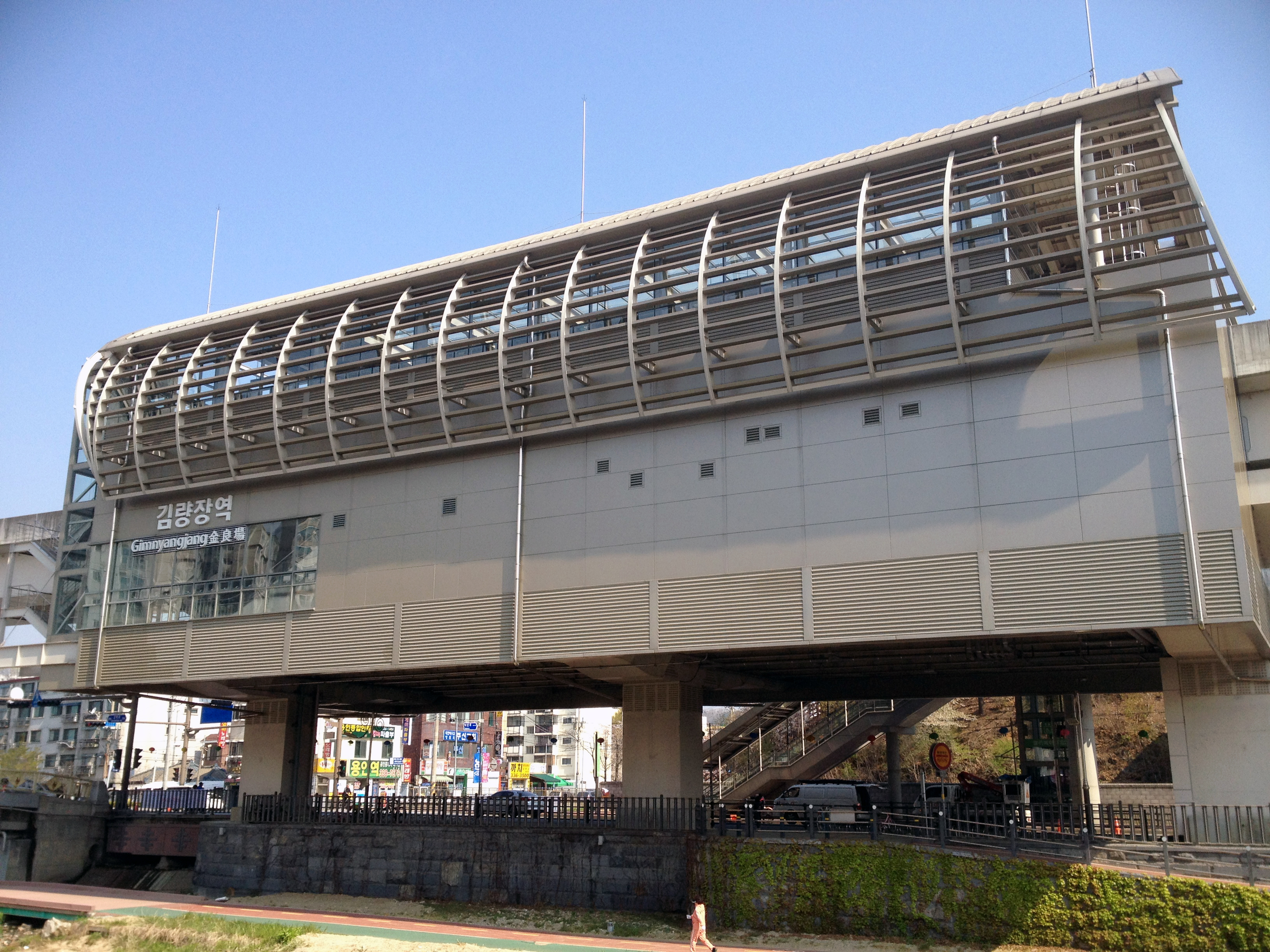

Korean name
- Hangul: 김량장역
- Hanja: 金良場驛
- Revised Romanization: Gimnyangjang-yeok
- McCune–Reischauer: Kimnyangchang-yŏk

General information
- Location: Gimnyangjang-dong, Cheoin-gu, Yongin
- Coordinates: 37.2374°N 127.1987°E
- Operator: Yongin EverLine Co,. Ltd. Neo Trans
- Line: EverLine
- Platforms: 2
- Tracks: 2

Key dates
- April 26, 2013: EverLine opened
Location

Gimnyangjang Station (Korean: 김량장역) is a station of the Everline in Gimnyangjang-dong, Cheoin-gu, Yongin, South Korea.

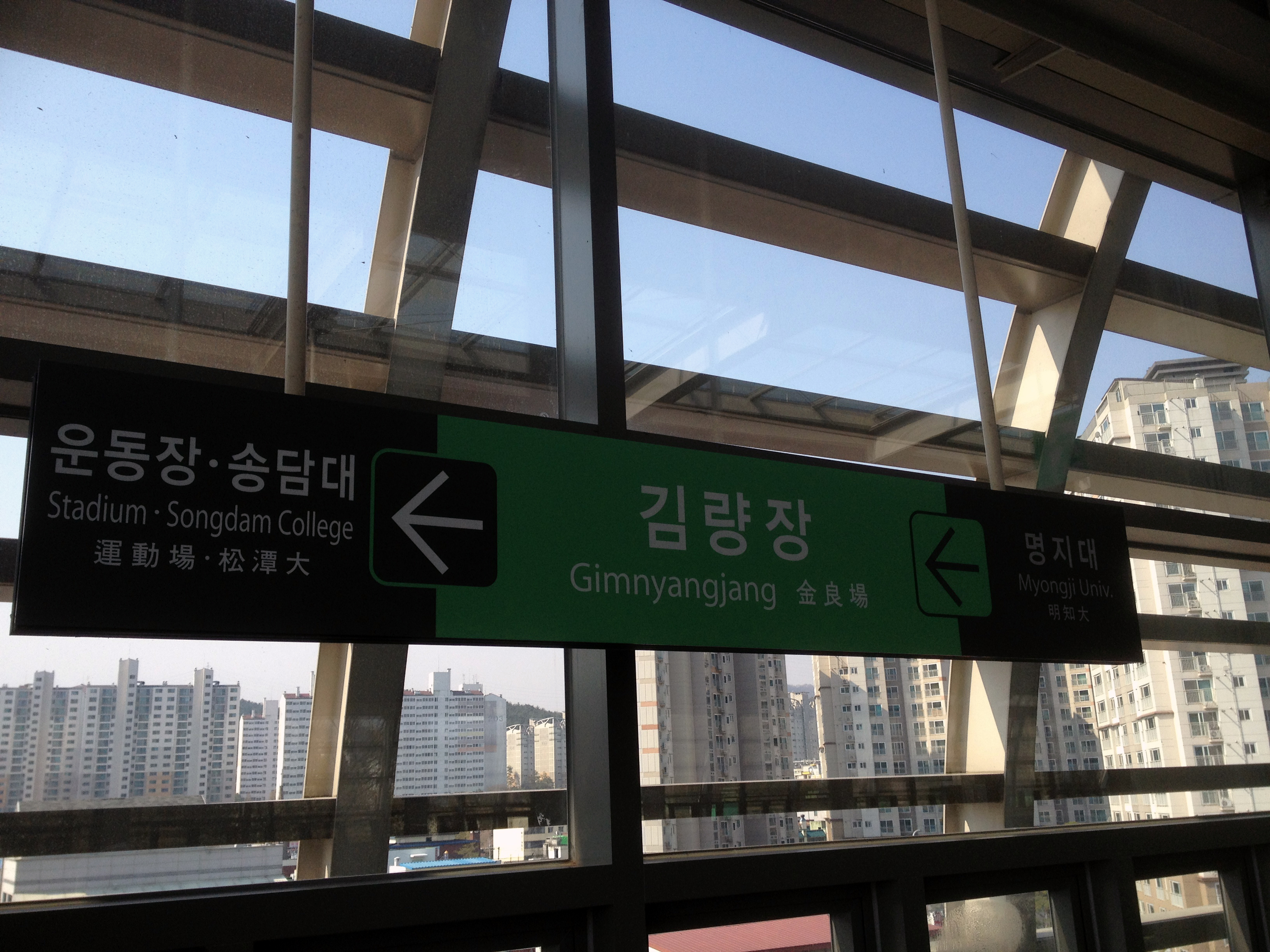
GIMNYANGJANG

Preceding station	Seoul Metropolitan Subway	Following station
Myongji University towards Giheung	EverLine	Yongin Jungang Market towards Jeondae–Everland
