= Myongji University station =

Metro station in Yongin, South Korea

Coordinates: 37.238106°N 127.190569°E

Y118 명지대 Myongji Univ.
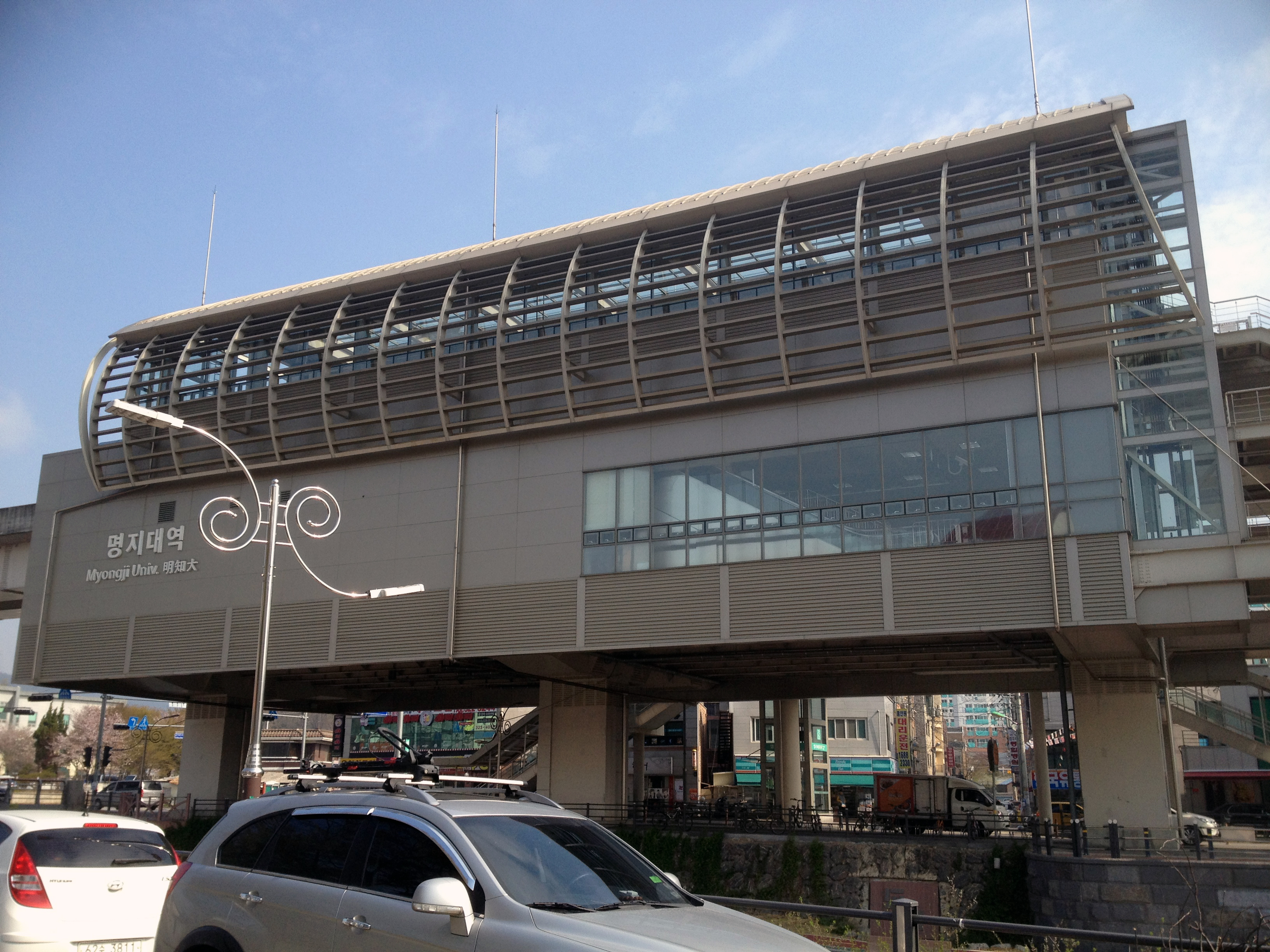

Korean name
- Hangul: 명지대역
- Hanja: 明知大驛
- Revised Romanization: Myeongjidaeyeok
- McCune–Reischauer: Myŏngjidaeyŏk

General information
- Location: 485 Yeokbuk-dong, Cheoin-gu, Yongin-si, Gyeonggi-do
- Operator: Yongin EverLine Co,. Ltd. Neo Trans
- Line: EverLine
- Platforms: 3
- Tracks: 2

Construction
- Structure type: Aboveground

Key dates
- April 26, 2013: EverLine opened
Location

Myongji University Station is located in Yongin, South Korea, on the EverLine.

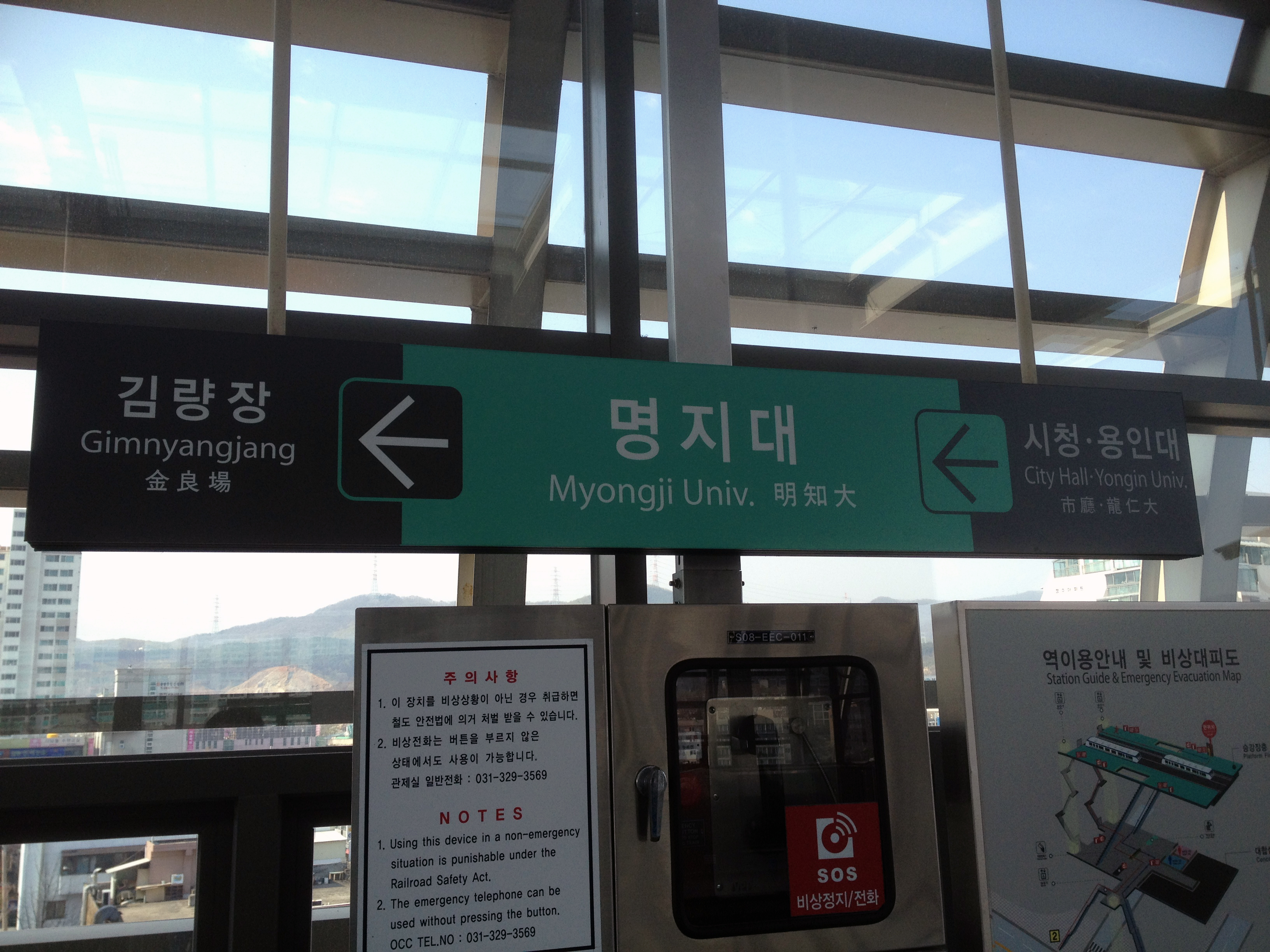

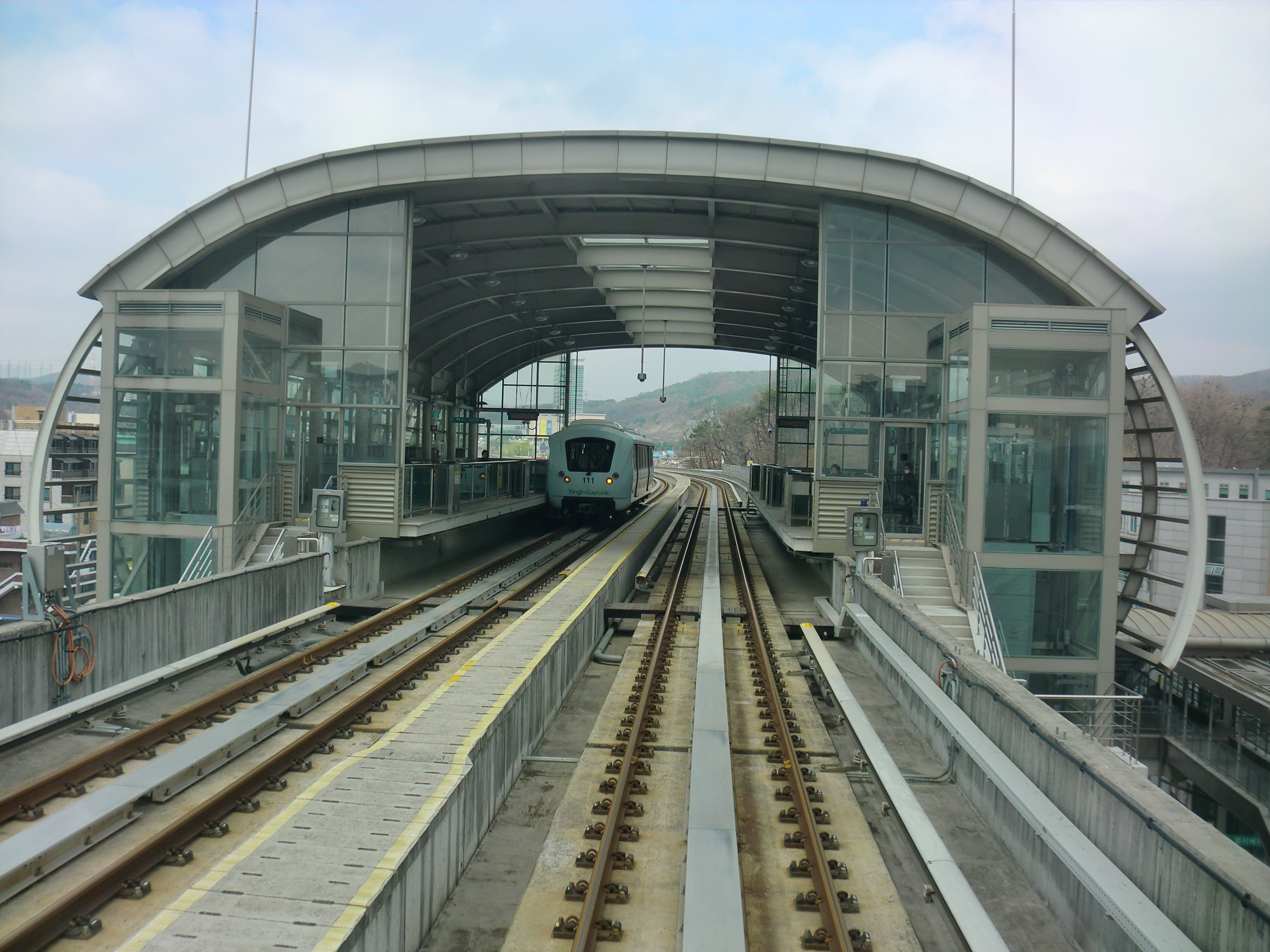

Preceding station	Seoul Metropolitan Subway	Following station
City Hall–Yongin University towards Giheung	EverLine	Gimnyangjang towards Jeondae–Everland
