= City Hall–Yongin University station =

Metro station in Yongin, South Korea

Y117 시청·용인대 City Hall·Yongin Univ.
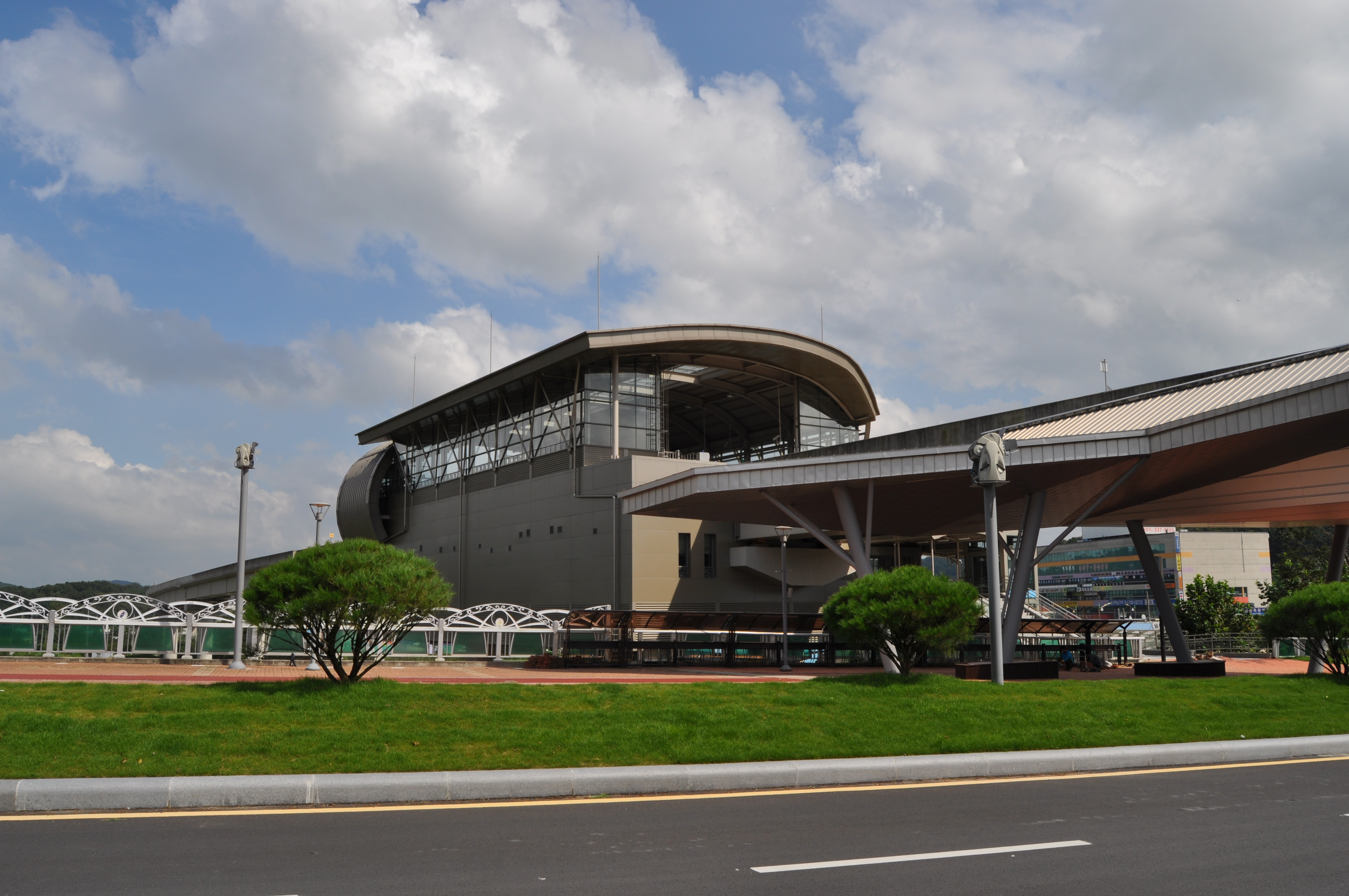

Korean name
- Hangul: 시청·용인대역
- Hanja: 市廳·龍仁大驛
- Revised Romanization: Sicheong · Yongindae-yeok
- McCune–Reischauer: Sich'ŏng · Yongindae-yŏk

General information
- Location: Samga-dong, Cheoin-gu, Yongin
- Coordinates: 37.2395°N 127.1790°E
- Operator: Yongin EverLine Co,. Ltd. Neo Trans
- Line: EverLine
- Platforms: 2
- Tracks: 2

Key dates
- April 26, 2013: EverLine opened
Location

City Hall·Yongin University Station (Korean: 시청·용인대역) is a station of the Everline in Samga-dong, Cheoin District, Yongin, South Korea. As its name suggests, Yongin City Hall is in front of the station.

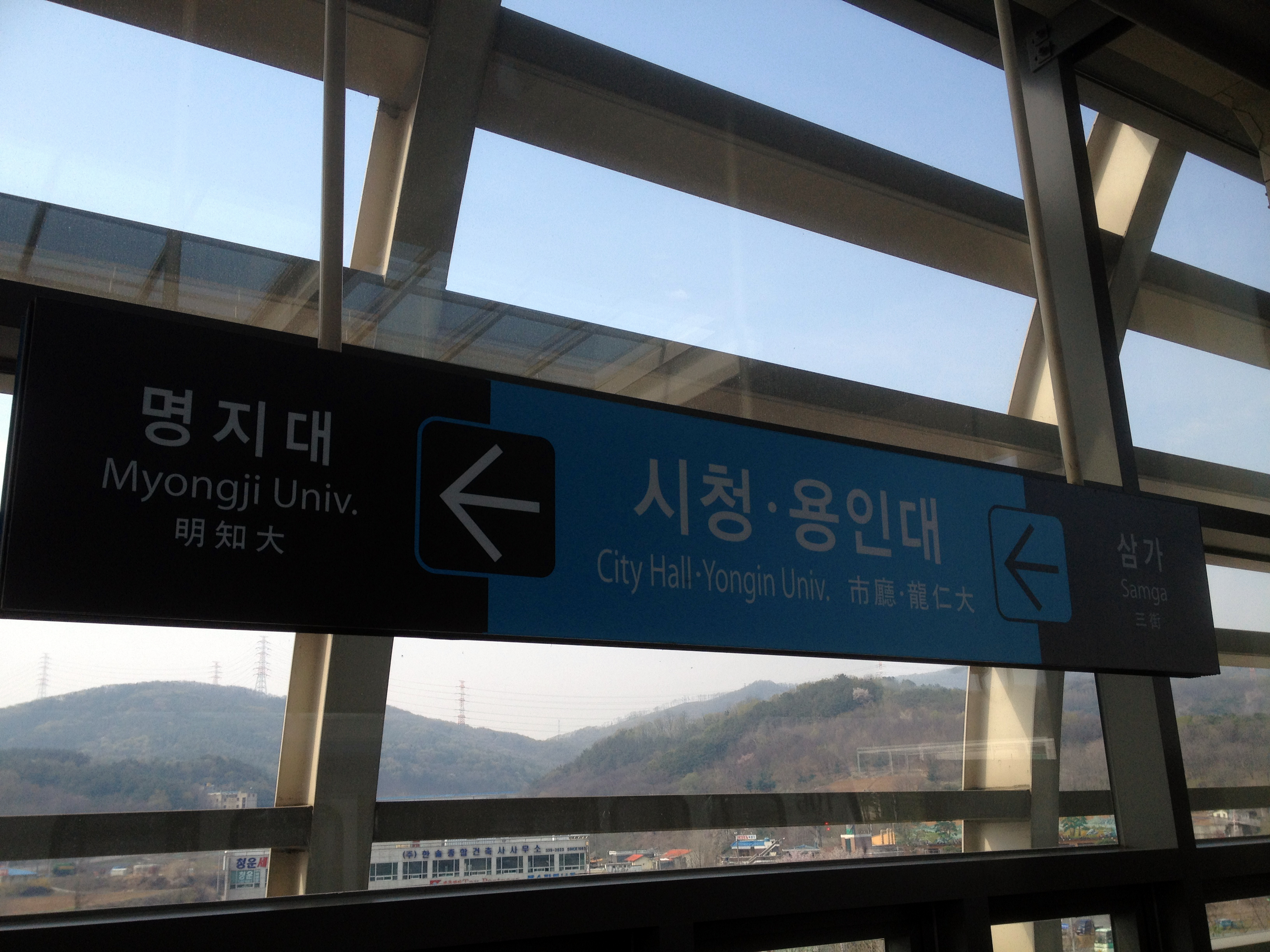

| Preceding station | Seoul Metropolitan Subway | Following station |
|---|---|---|
| Samga towards Giheung | EverLine | Myongji University towards Jeondae–Everland |
