= Gojin station =

Metro station in Yongin, South Korea

Y121 고진 Gojin
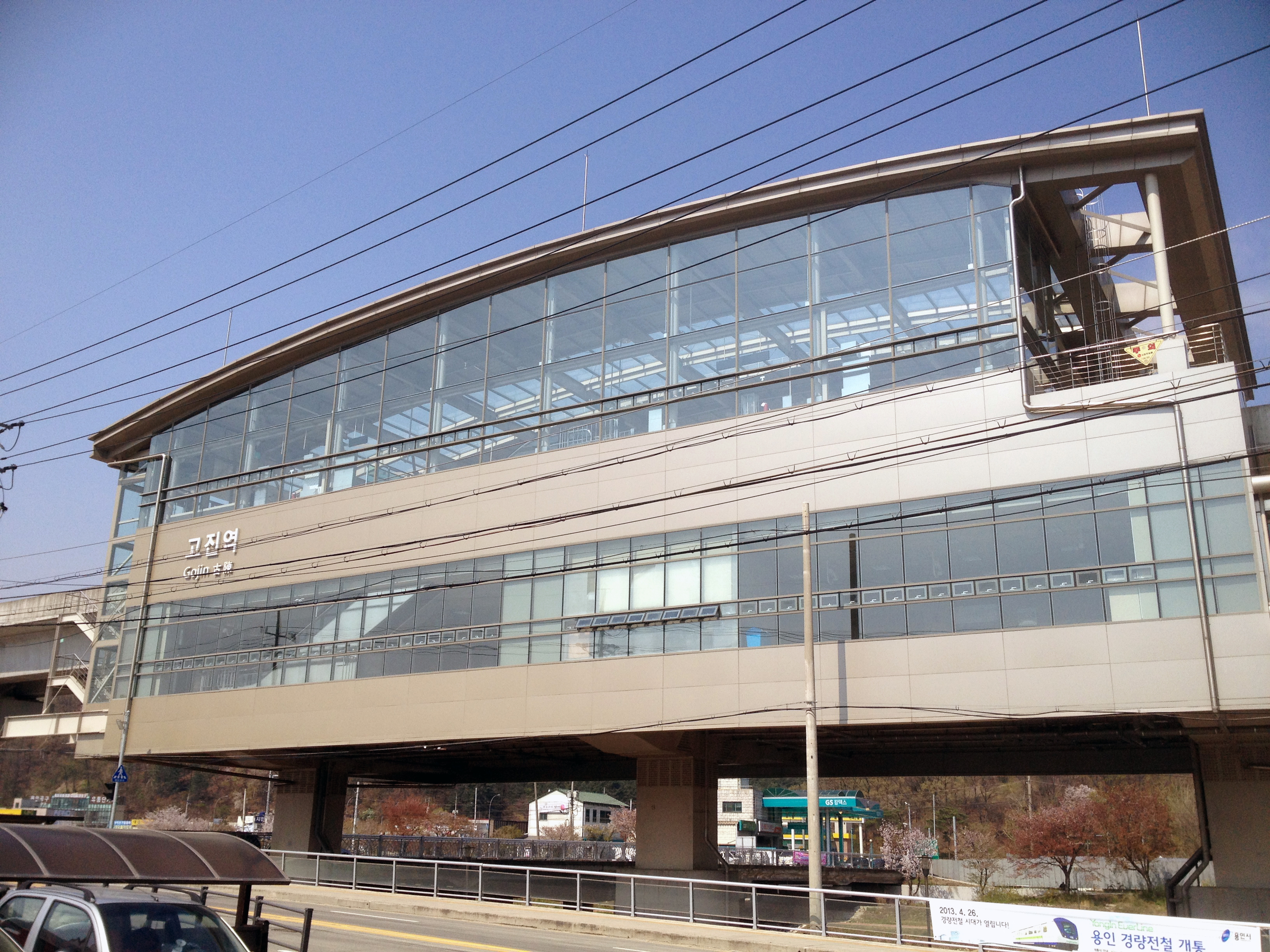

Korean name
- Hangul: 고진역
- Hanja: 古陳驛
- Revised Romanization: Gojin-yeok
- McCune–Reischauer: Kochin-yŏk

General information
- Location: Yubang-dong, Cheoin-gu, Yongin
- Coordinates: 37.2447°N 127.2143°E
- Operator: Yongin EverLine Co,. Ltd. Neo Trans
- Line: EverLine
- Platforms: 2
- Tracks: 2

Key dates
- April 26, 2013: EverLine opened
Location

Gojin Station (Korean: 고진역) is a station of the Everline in Yubang-dong, Cheoin-gu, Yongin, South Korea.

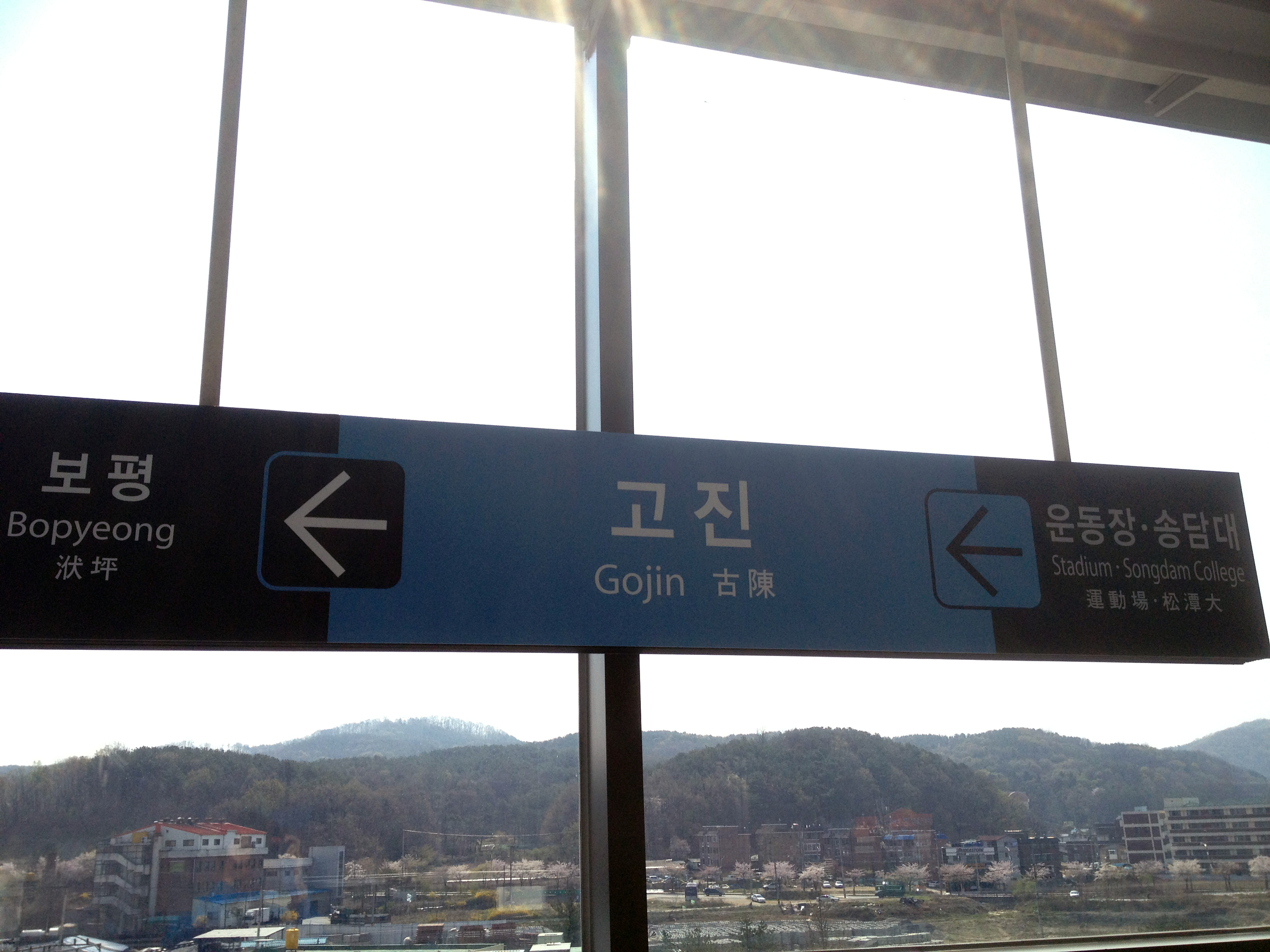

Preceding station	Seoul Metropolitan Subway	Following station
Yongin Jungang Market towards Giheung	EverLine	Bopyeong towards Jeondae–Everland
