= Samga station =

Metro station in Yongin, South Korea

Y116 삼가 (용인미르스타디움) Samga (Yongin Mireu Stadium)
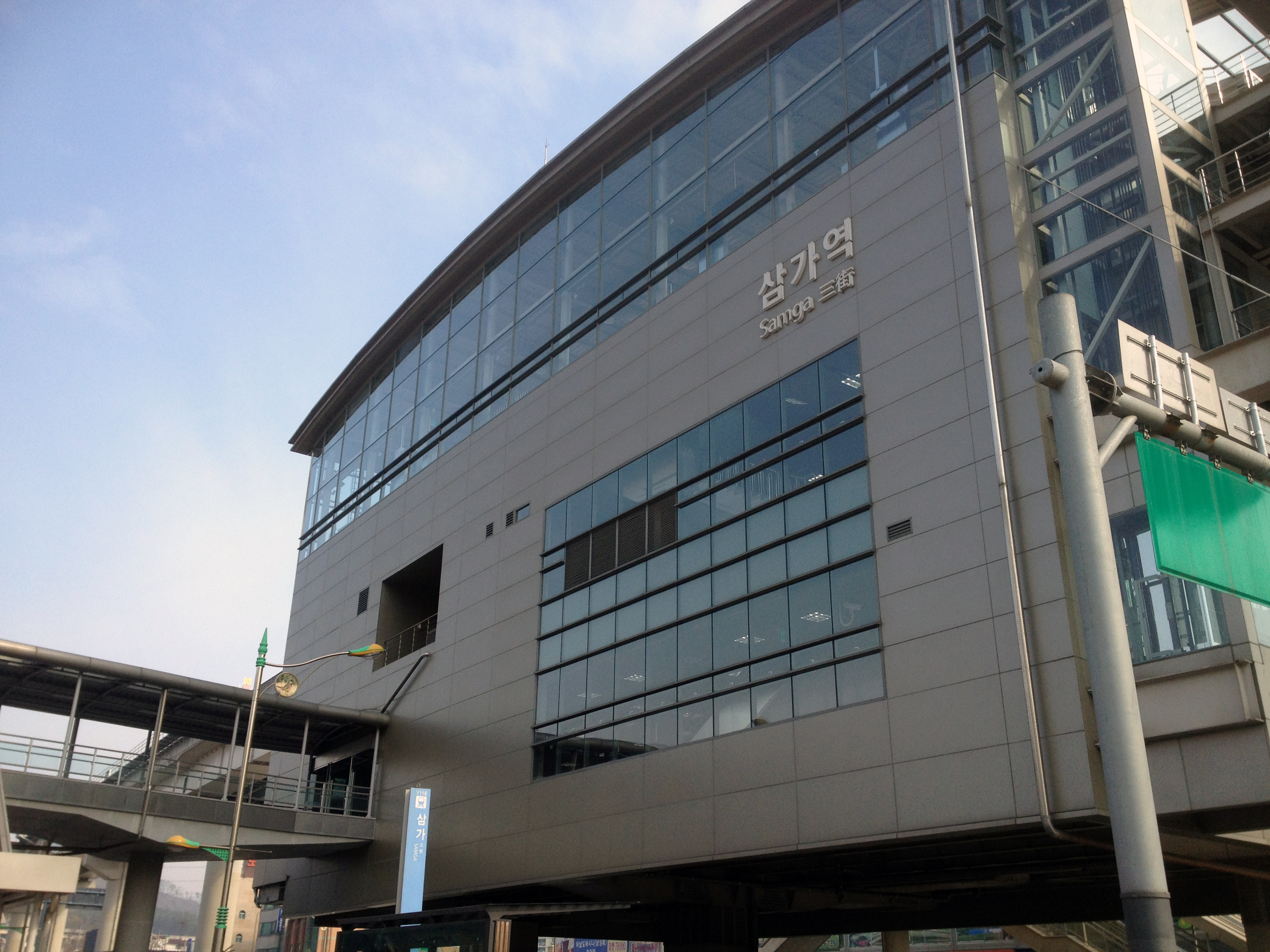

Korean name
- Hangul: 삼가역
- Hanja: 三街驛
- Revised Romanization: Samga yeok
- McCune–Reischauer: Samka yŏk

General information
- Location: Samga-dong, Cheoin-gu, Yongin
- Coordinates: 37.2422°N 127.1682°E
- Operator: Yongin EverLine Co,. Ltd. Neo Trans
- Line: EverLine
- Platforms: 2
- Tracks: 2

Key dates
- April 26, 2013: EverLine opened
Location

Samga Station (Korean: 삼가역; Hanja: 三街驛) is a station of the Everline in Samga-dong, Cheoin-gu, Yongin, South Korea.

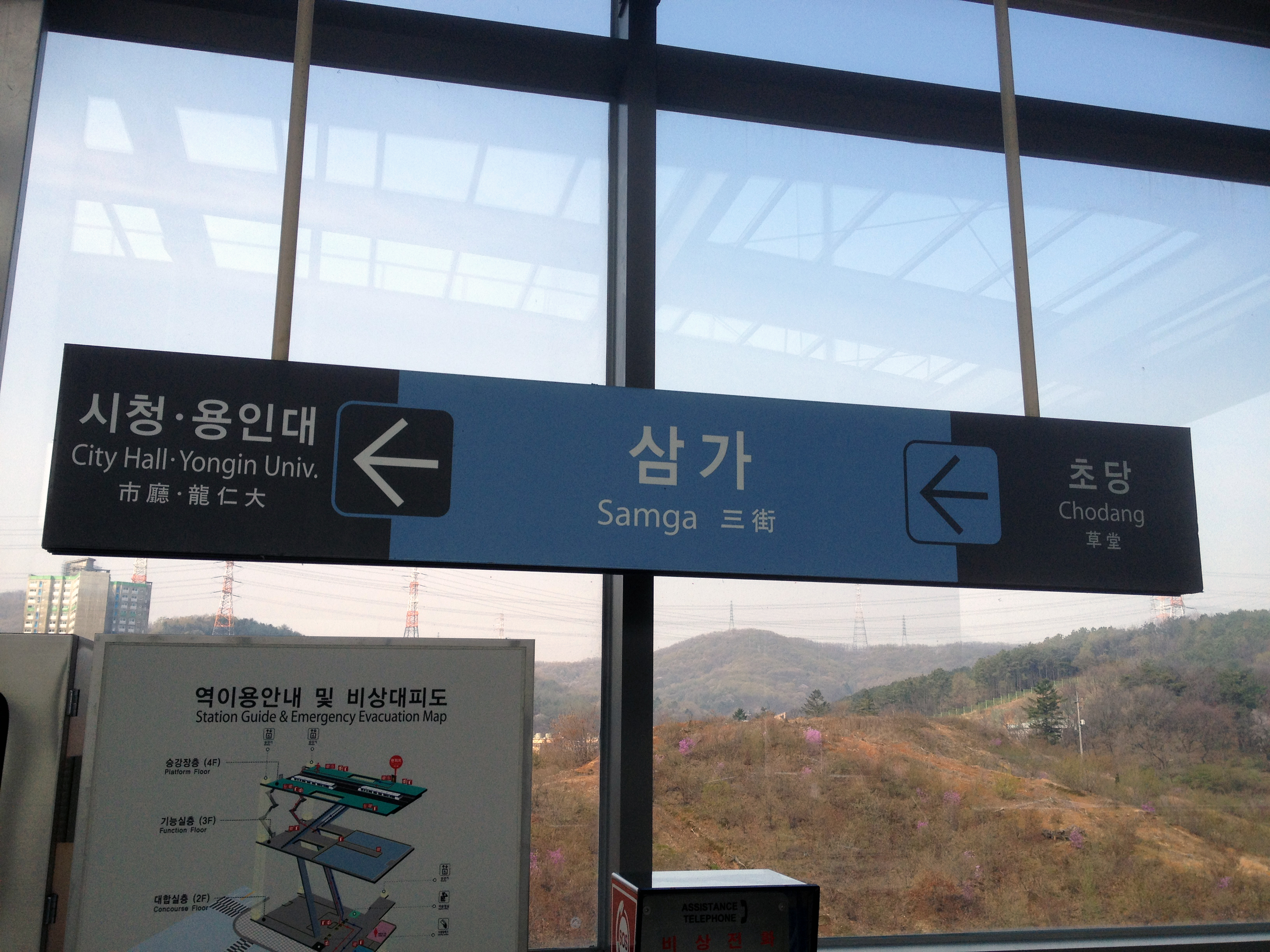

Preceding station	Seoul Metropolitan Subway	Following station
Chodang towards Giheung	EverLine	City Hall–Yongin University towards Jeondae–Everland
