= Yongin Jungang Market station =

Metro station in Yongin, South Korea

Y120 용인중앙시장 (용인예술과학대) Yongin Jungang Market (Yongin Arts & Science Univ.)
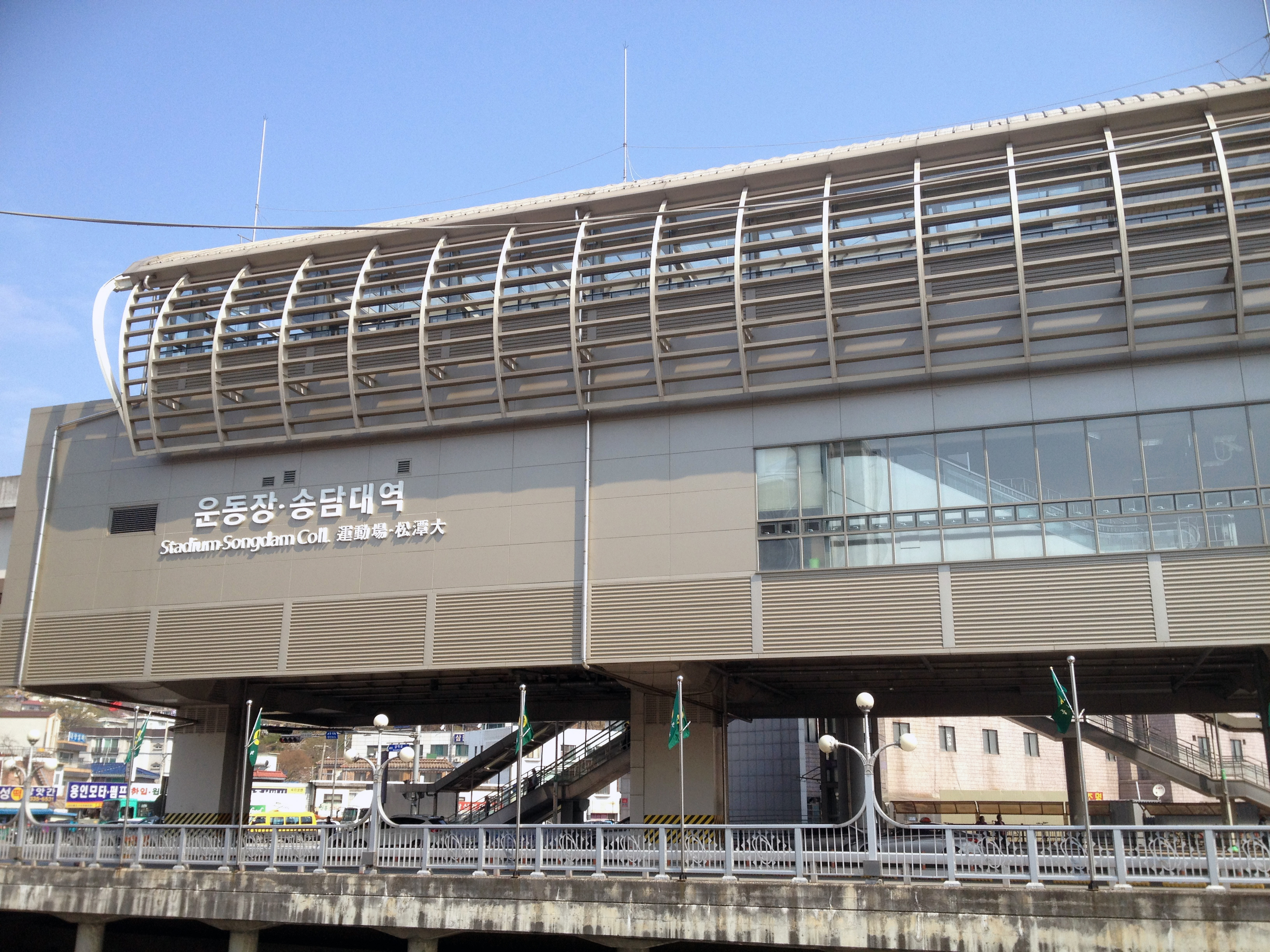

Korean name
- Hangul: 용인중앙시장역
- Hanja: 龍仁中央市場驛
- Revised Romanization: Yonginjungangsijang-yeok
- McCune–Reischauer: Yonginjungangsijang-yŏk

General information
- Location: Gimnyangjang-dong, Cheoin-gu, Yongin
- Coordinates: 37.2380°N 127.2091°E
- Operator: Yongin EverLine Co,. Ltd. Neo Trans
- Line: EverLine
- Platforms: 2
- Tracks: 2

Key dates
- April 26, 2013: EverLine opened
Location

Yongin Jungang Market Station (Korean: 용인중앙시장역; Hanja: 龍仁中央市場驛) is a station of the Everline in Gimnyangjang-dong, Cheoin-gu, Yongin, South Korea.

Originally, this station opened as Stadium·Songdam College Station, and changed its current name from January 29, 2024.

| Preceding station | Seoul Metropolitan Subway | Following station |
|---|---|---|
| Gimnyangjang towards Giheung | EverLine | Gojin towards Jeondae–Everland |
