= Dunjeon station =

Metro station in Yongin, South Korea

Y123 둔전 Dunjeon
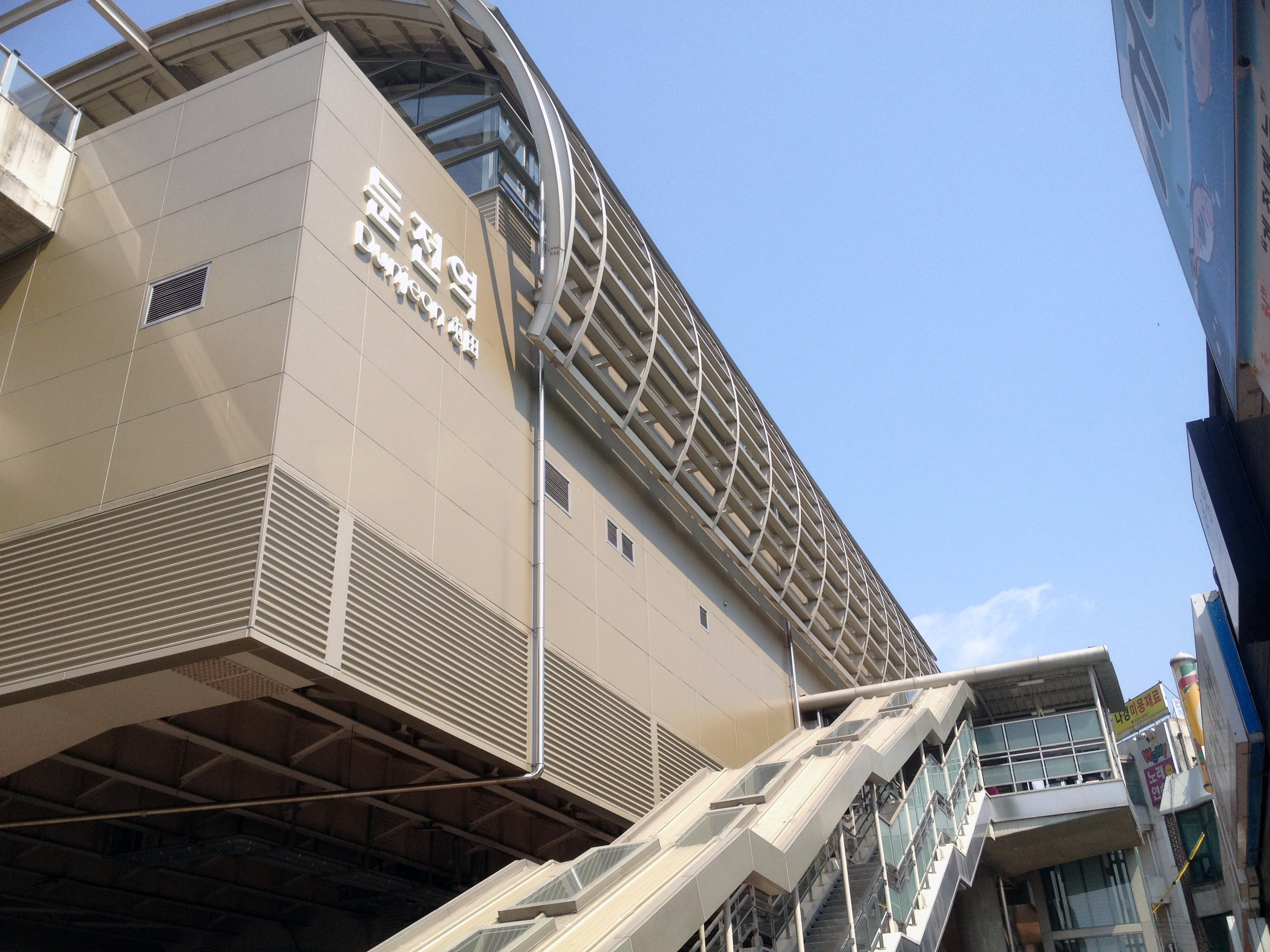

Korean name
- Hangul: 둔전역
- Hanja: 屯田驛
- Revised Romanization: Dunjeon-nyeok
- McCune–Reischauer: Tunjŏn-nyŏk

General information
- Location: Dunjeon-ri, Pogok-eup, Cheoin-gu, Yongin
- Coordinates: 37.2672°N 127.2138°E
- Operator: Yongin EverLine Co,. Ltd. Neo Trans
- Line: EverLine
- Platforms: 2
- Tracks: 2

Key dates
- April 26, 2013: EverLine opened
Location

Dunjeon Station (Korean: 둔전역; Hanja: 屯田驛) is a station of the Everline in Dunjeon-ri, Pogok-eup, Cheoin-gu, Yongin, South Korea.

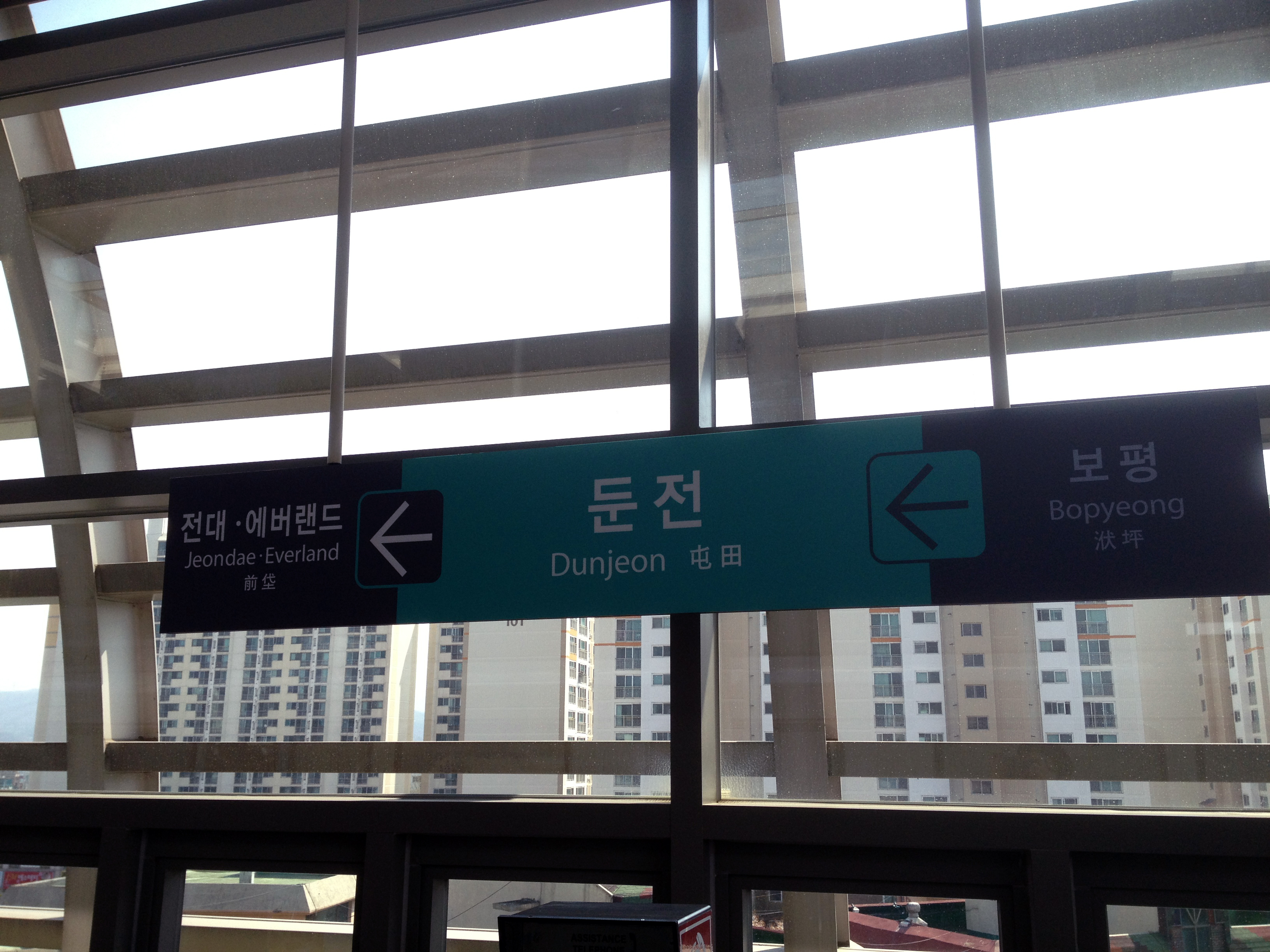

Preceding station	Seoul Metropolitan Subway	Following station
Bopyeong towards Giheung	EverLine	Jeondae–Everland Terminus
