= EverLine =

Automated people mover in Gyeonggi-do, South Korea

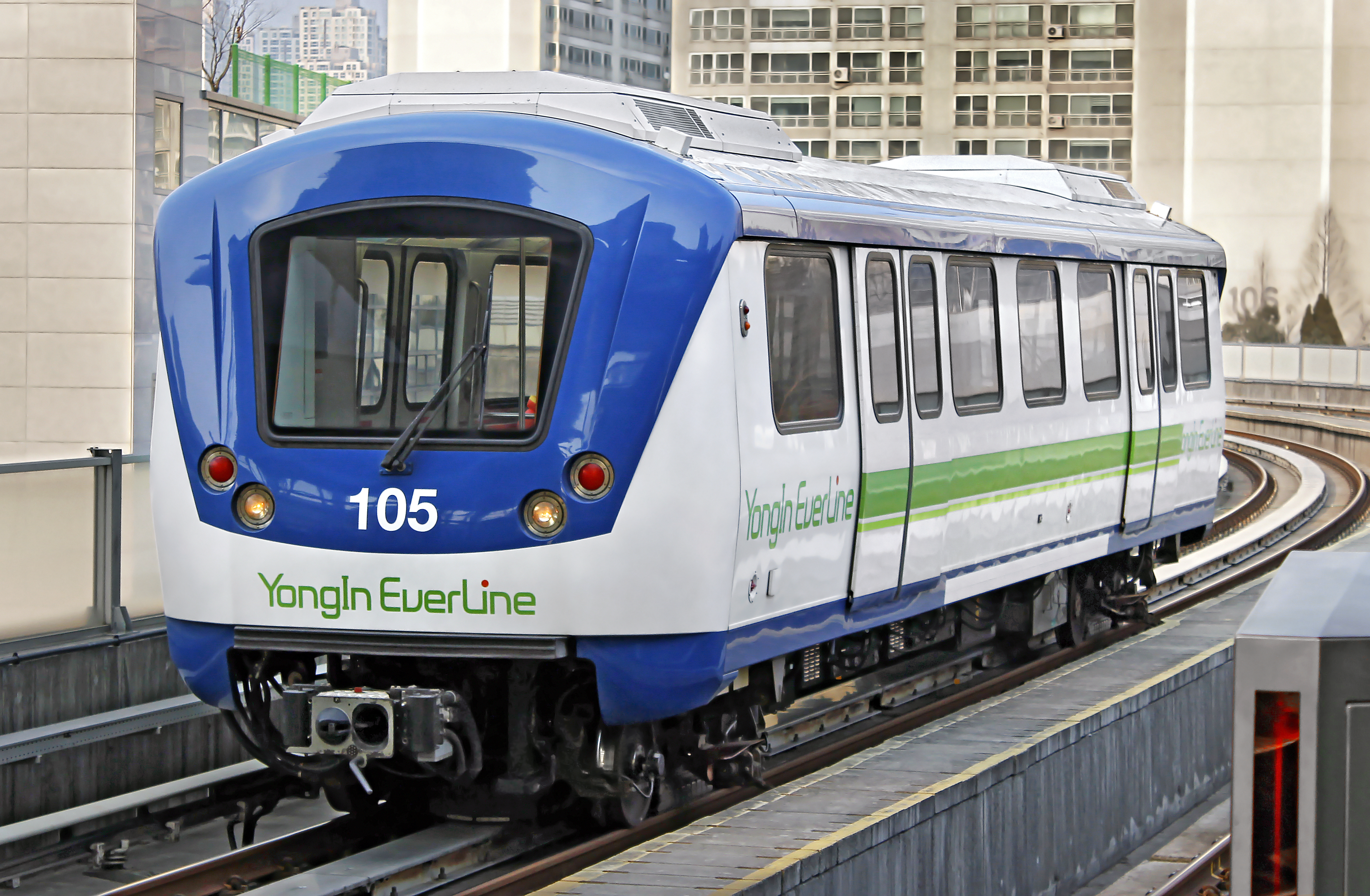

Overview
- Native name: 에버라인; Everline
- Status: Operational
- Owner: Yongin EverLine Co,. Ltd., Neo Trans
- Termini: Giheung; Jeondae - Everland
- Stations: 15

Service
- Type: People mover
- System: Seoul Metropolitan Subway
- Depot: Samga
- Rolling stock: 30 × Bombardier Innovia ART 200 Y100

History
- Opened: April 26, 2013

Technical
- Line length: 18.143 km (11.274 mi)
- Number of tracks: 2
- Track gauge: 1,435 mm (4 ft 8 1/2 in) standard gauge
- Electrification: 750 V DC Third rail
- Operating speed: 80 km/h (50 mph)
- Signalling: Bombardier CITYFLO 650 CBTC

The Yongin EverLine (or EverLine; Korean: 에버라인, Yongin Light Rail Transit) is a fully automated driverless 18.1-kilometer (11.2 mi) people mover line in Yongin, Gyeonggi Province, Seoul Metropolitan Area connecting Everland, South Korea's most popular theme park, to the Suin-Bundang Line of the Seoul Metropolitan Subway, a system which it is arguably a part of. The system is identical to the AirTrain JFK people mover and airport rail link in New York City, using single-car Bombardier Advanced Rapid Transit vehicles controlled by Bombardier CITYFLO 650 automatic train control technology.

Planning for the line started in April 1996. Ground was broken for construction in November 2005. Starting in November 2009, the operating company conducted test runs of the trains. The opening was delayed several times but finally opened for service on April 26, 2013. A physical transfer to the (underground) Suin-Bundang line at Giheung Station opened on January 9, 2014 and a transfer discount to the line was introduced on September 20 of the same year.

It was scheduled to open on April 16, 2011, but it did not open due to noise complaints and safety issues related to facilities in some sections of the line, as well as conflicts between the construction company and Yongin City, the ultimate operator. The opening date was postponed indefinitely several times, but it was later resolved through arbitration by the International Court of Arbitration when Yongin City paid compensation to Yongin Light Rail, and it finally opened belatedly on April 26, 2013. The color used for signage and branding is lime green.

== Operation ==
Trains run every 6 minutes (9 minutes on Sundays and holidays). One-car trains are operated, but trains can be lengthened to two cars if necessary, similar to the AirTrain JFK. Despite being a medium capacity system, at 3.2 meters (10 ft 6 in), they are the widest trains in South Korea. Each car has a capacity of 133 passengers.

== Stations ==
All stations are in Yongin-si, Gyeonggi-do. The line is 18.1 km (11.2 mi) long.

Station Number	Station Name English	Station Name Hangul	Transfer	Distance in km	Total Distance	Station Type	Location
Y110	Giheung (Nam June Paik Art Center)	기흥 (백남준아트센터)	Suin–Bundang Line	---	0.000	Elevated	Giheung-gu
Y111	Kangnam University	강남대	-	1.044	1.044	Ground level	Giheung-gu
Y112	Jiseok	지석	-	1.062	2.106	Elevated	Giheung-gu
Y113	Eojeong	어정	-	0.918	3.024	Elevated	Giheung-gu
Y114	Dongbaek	동백 (용인세브란스병원)	-	1.185	4.209	Elevated	Giheung-gu
Y115	Chodang	초당	-	1.097	5.306	Elevated	Giheung-gu
Y116	Samga	삼가	-	2.591	7.897	Elevated	Cheoin-gu
Y117	City Hall·Yongin University	시청·용인대	-	1.045	8.942	Elevated	Cheoin-gu
Y118	Myongji University	명지대	-	1.034	9.976	Elevated	Cheoin-gu
Y119	Gimnyangjang	김량장	-	0.755	10.731	Elevated	Cheoin-gu
Y120	Yongin Jungang Market (Yongin Arts&Science Univ.)	용인중앙시장 (용인과학예술대)	-	0.945	11.676	Elevated	Cheoin-gu
Y121	Gojin	고진	-	0.935	12.611	Elevated	Cheoin-gu
Y122	Bopyeong	보평	-	1.750	14.361	Elevated	Cheoin-gu
Y123	Dunjeon	둔전	-	1.027	15.388	Elevated	Cheoin-gu
Y124	Jeondae·Everland	전대·에버랜드	-	2.626	18.014	Ground level	Cheoin-gu

== Ridership ==
Ridership was lower than expected on opening day; around 9,000 people per day in April 2013. Daily ridership totals eventually grew to around 30,000 people by the middle of 2015. The increase is touted to be the result of a fare integration program introduced on September 20, 2014. After a period of unstable patronage caused by the COVID-19 pandemic, daily ridership rose to 40,000 by May 2024.

== Expansion ==
There are plans to extend the line 6.8 km (4.2 mi) from Giheung Station to Gwanggyo Station on the Shinbundang Line. Additionally, Neo Trans, the operator of the Shinbundang Line, took over operations in 2016. Operation of the trains was transferred back to Yongin Light Rail Co., Ltd on August 1, 2023.

== Controversy ==
=== Ridership estimates ===
Initial forecasts from 2001 expected daily ridership to reach 140,000 people per day at the time of opening. However, later estimates revealed that this number would instead be closer to 32,000 riders per day due to the improvement of existing transportation options and construction delays on the Suin–Bundang Line at Giheung station (which would not open until 2011).

As a result, the city government of Yongin was ordered to pay the consortium ₩7.79 billion in compensation at the behest of the International Chamber of Commerce. The city of Yongin and Yongin Light Rail Co., Ltd. re-negotiated a new operating contract in 2012, which required the city to pay approximately US$20,000,000 per year to cover for losses.

=== Bombardier Transportation corruption allegations ===
South Korean authorities investigated possible corruption by Bombardier Transportation officials over the building of this line and concerns that ridership was exaggerated to have the technology preferentially chosen over other contenders. No charges were filed due to a lack of presented evidence and the case reaching its statute of limitation.
