= 둔전역 =

둔전역 (屯田驛) may refer to stations:

- Dunjeon station, railway station on the Everline
- Tunjon station, railway station on the P'yŏngra Line of the Korean State Railway
