= Giheung District =

District of Yongin, South Korea

Coordinates: 37.280406°N 127.114659°E

- Non-autonomous District
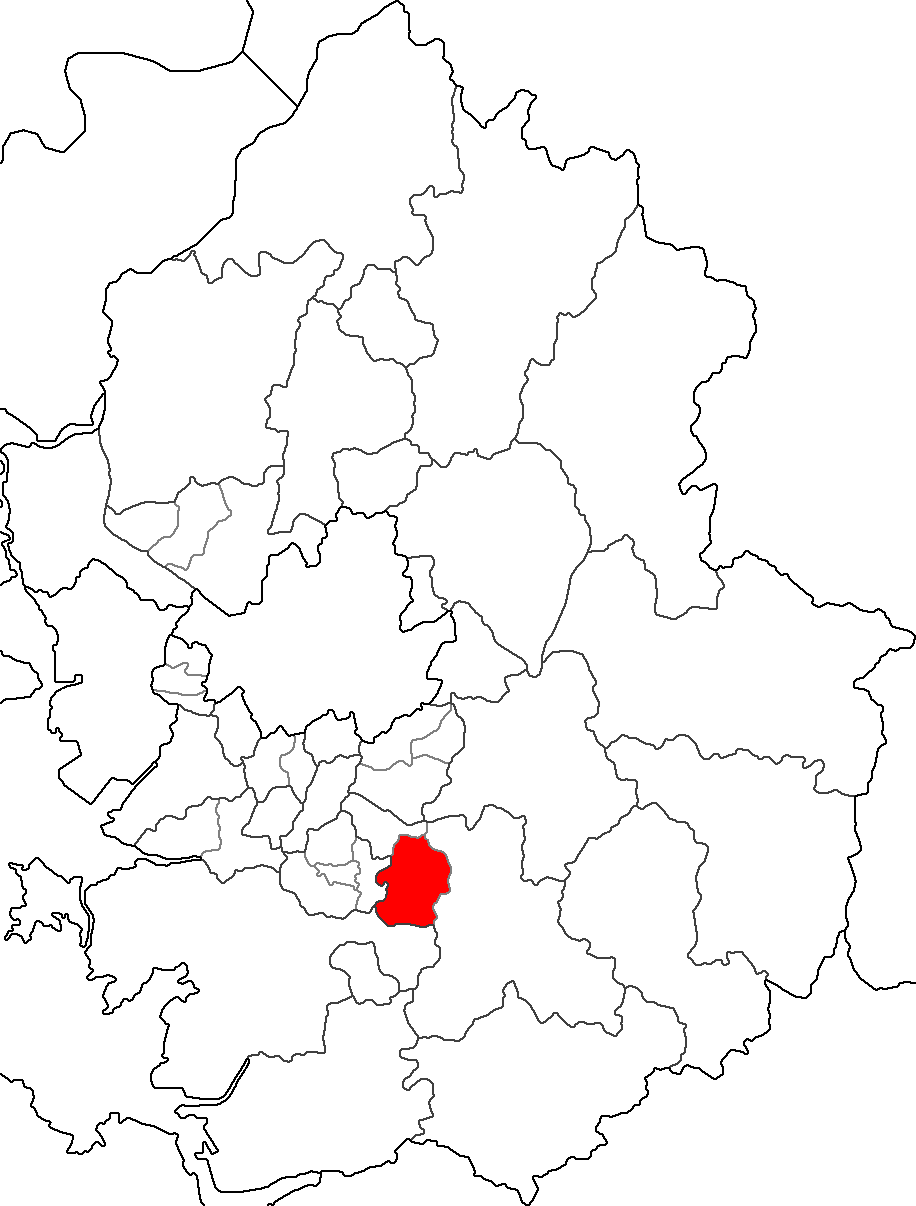
- Map of Gyeonggi highlighting Giheung District.
- Country: South Korea
- Region: Sudogwon (Gijeon)
- Province: Gyeonggi
- City: Yongin

Area
  - Total: 81.67 km^{2} (31.53 sq mi)

Population (2022)
  - Total: 439,877
  - Density: 5,384.17/km^{2} (13,944.9/sq mi)
  - Dialect: Seoul
- Website: Giheung District Office

Korean name
- Hangul: 기흥구
- Hanja: 器興區
- RR: Giheung-gu
- MR: Kihŭng-gu

Giheung District (Korean: 기흥구) is a gu (district) in Yongin, South Korea. It has 10 dong (neighborhoods). Its area is 81.67 km^{2} and it has 439.877 inhabitants (in 2022). Giheung District was formed in 2005. It was formed with other gu in Yongin in 2005.

== Administrative divisions ==
Giheung District is divided into the following "dong"s.

- Giheung-dong (divided in turn into Gomae-dong and Gongse-dong)
- Sanggal-dong (divided in turn into Sanggal-dong, Bora-dong and Jigok-dong)
- Singal-dong (divided in turn into Singal-dong, Hagal-dong and Yeongdeok-dong)
- Guseong-dong (divided in turn into Eonnam-dong and Cheongdeok-dong)
- Dongbaek-dong (divided in turn into Dongbaek-dong and Jung-dong)
- Seonong-dong (combination of Seocheon-dong and Nongseo-dong)
- Gugal-dong
- Mabuk-dong
- Bojeong-dong
- Sangha-dong

== List of gu in Yongin ==
- Cheoin District
- Suji District

== Attractions ==
- Hill 151 in Bora-dong, There was a battle between Turkish Brigade and Chinese People's Volunteer Army during Korean War.

== Gallery ==
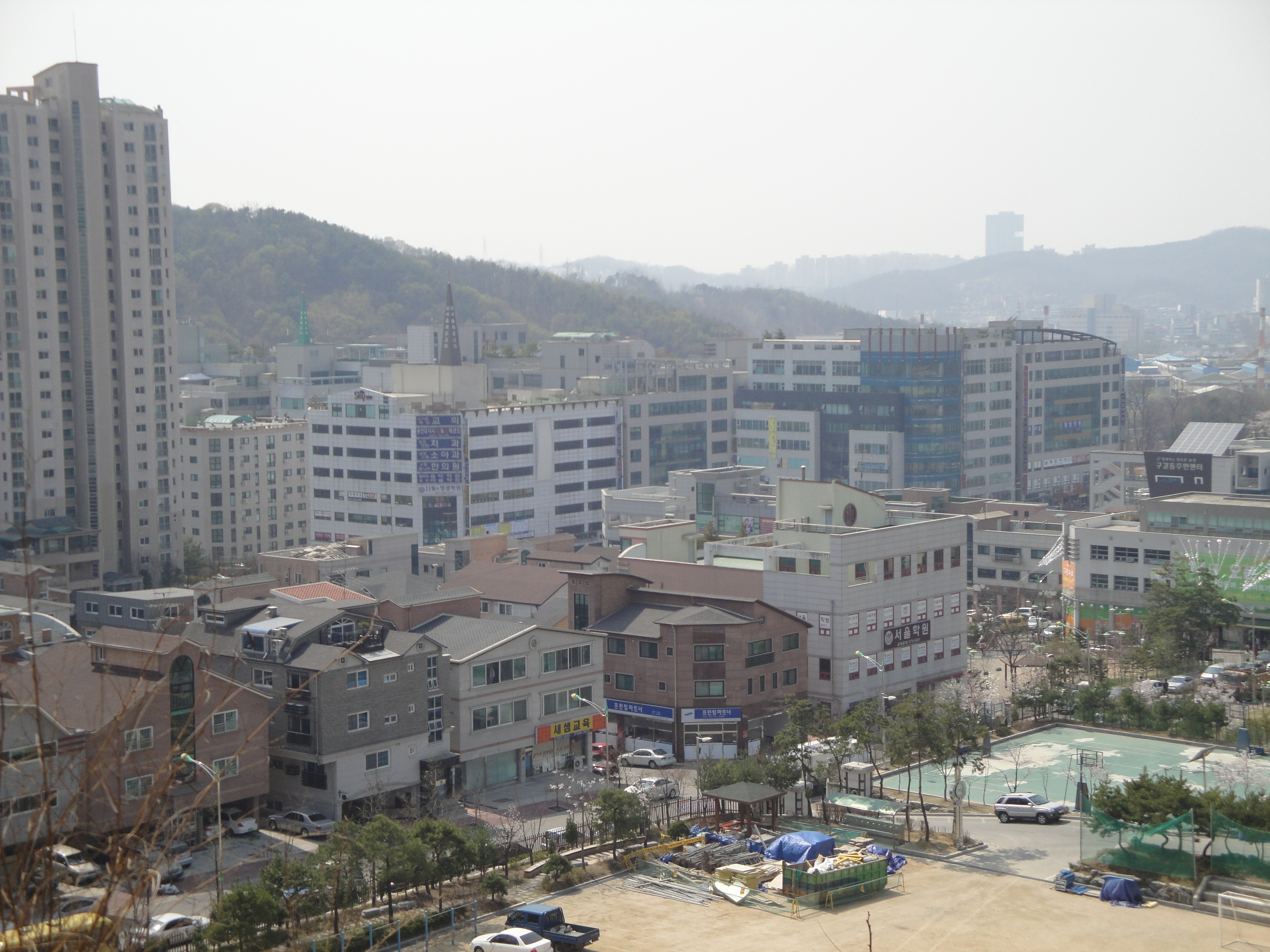
Gugal-dong

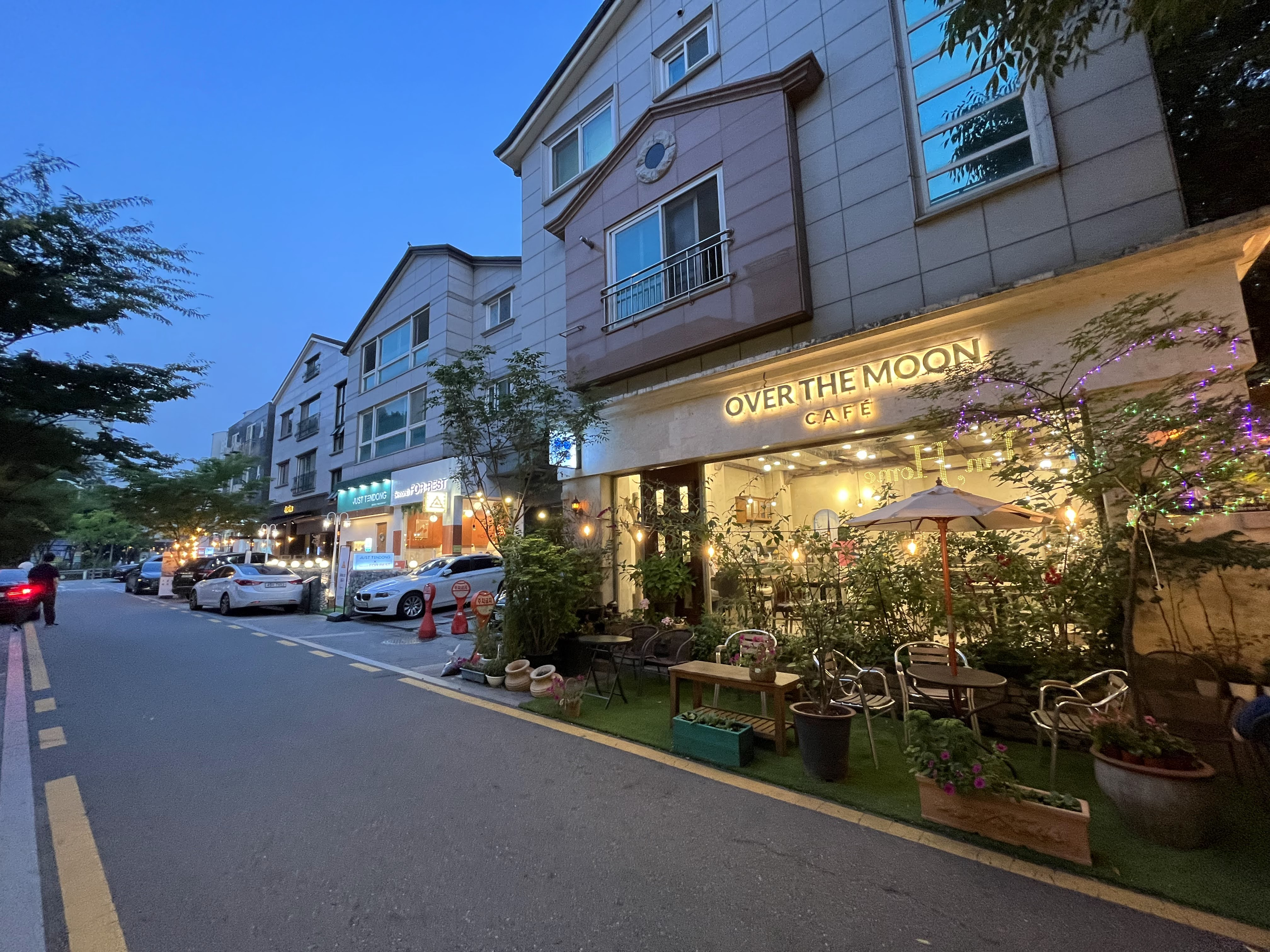
Bojeong-dong
