= Jeondae–Everland station =

Metro station in Yongin, South Korea

Y124 전대·에버랜드 Jeondae·Everland
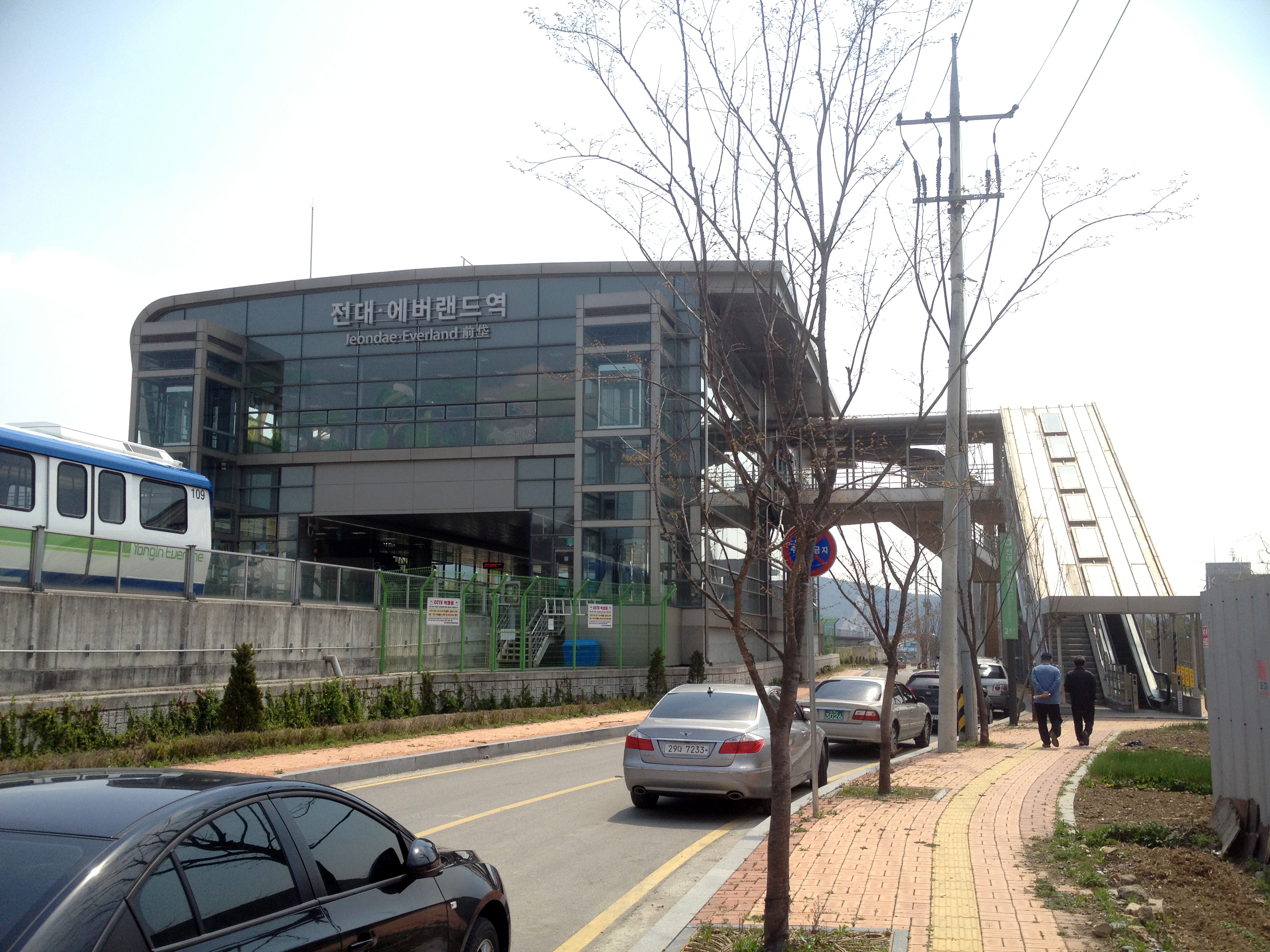

Korean name
- Hangul: 전대·에버랜드
- Hanja: 前垈·에버랜드
- Revised Romanization: Jeondae-ebeoraendeu-yeok
- McCune–Reischauer: Chŏndae-ebŏraendŭ-yŏk

General information
- Location: 143 Ebeoraendeuro, Cheoin-gu, Pogok-eup, Yongin, Gyeonggi
- Coordinates: 37°17′07.0″N 127°13′09.9″E
- Operator: Yongin EverLine Co,. Ltd. Neo Trans
- Line: EverLine
- Platforms: 2
- Tracks: 2

Construction
- Structure type: Aboveground

Key dates
- April 26, 2013: EverLine opened
Location

Jeondae·Everland Station is a light rail station located in Cheoin-gu, Yongin, close to Everland amusement park. It is the terminus station of the EverLine and opened on April 26, 2013.

Everland operates a free-of-charge shuttle bus from the station.

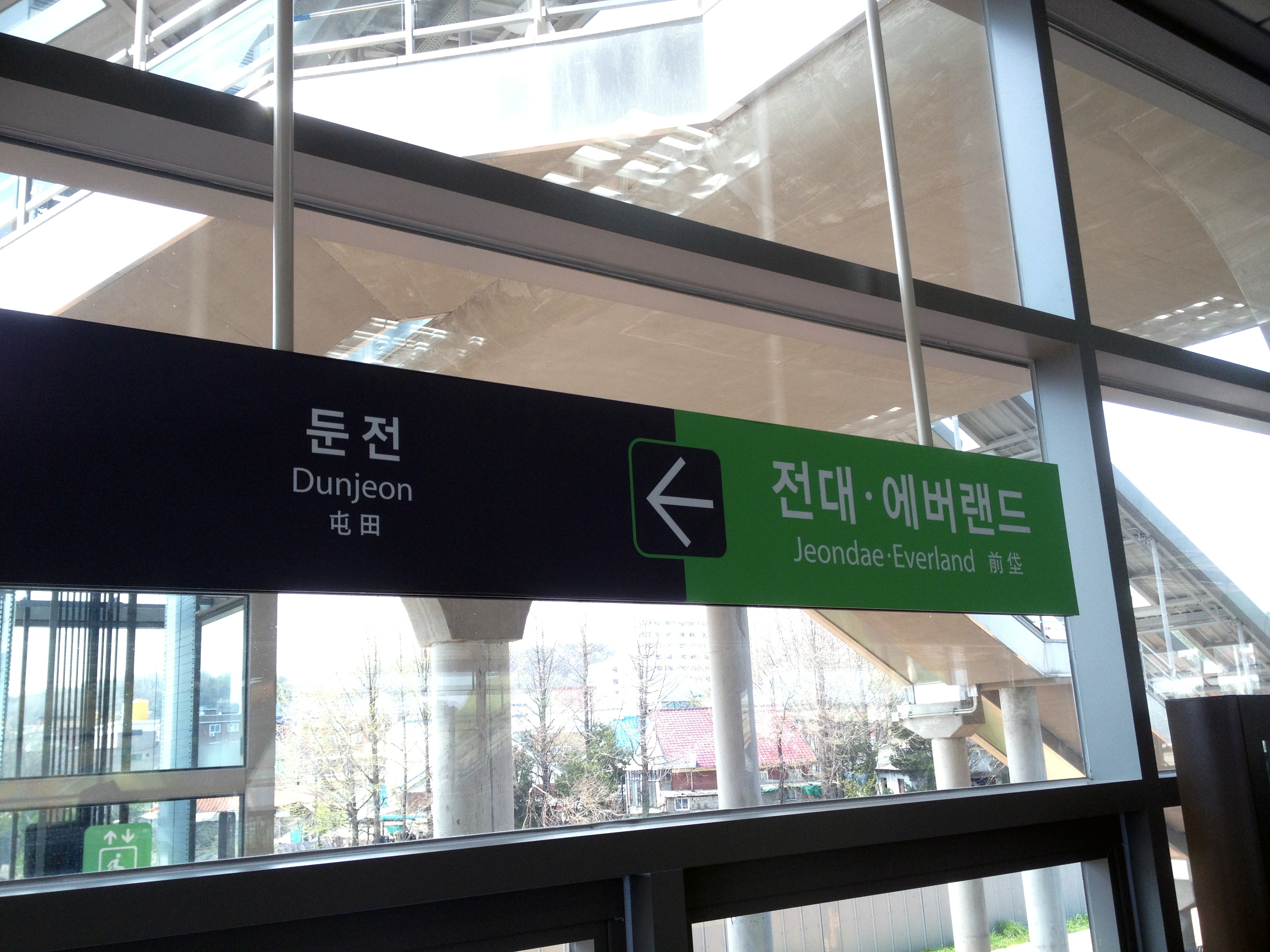

Preceding station	Seoul Metropolitan Subway	Following station
Dunjeon towards Giheung	EverLine	Terminus
