= Giheung station =

Metro station in Yongin, South Korea

Coordinates: 37°16′31.07″N 127°6′57.48″E

| 기흥 (백남준아트센터); Giheung (Nam June Paik Art Center) |
Y110
기흥 (백남준아트센터)
Giheung
(Nam June Paik Art Center)
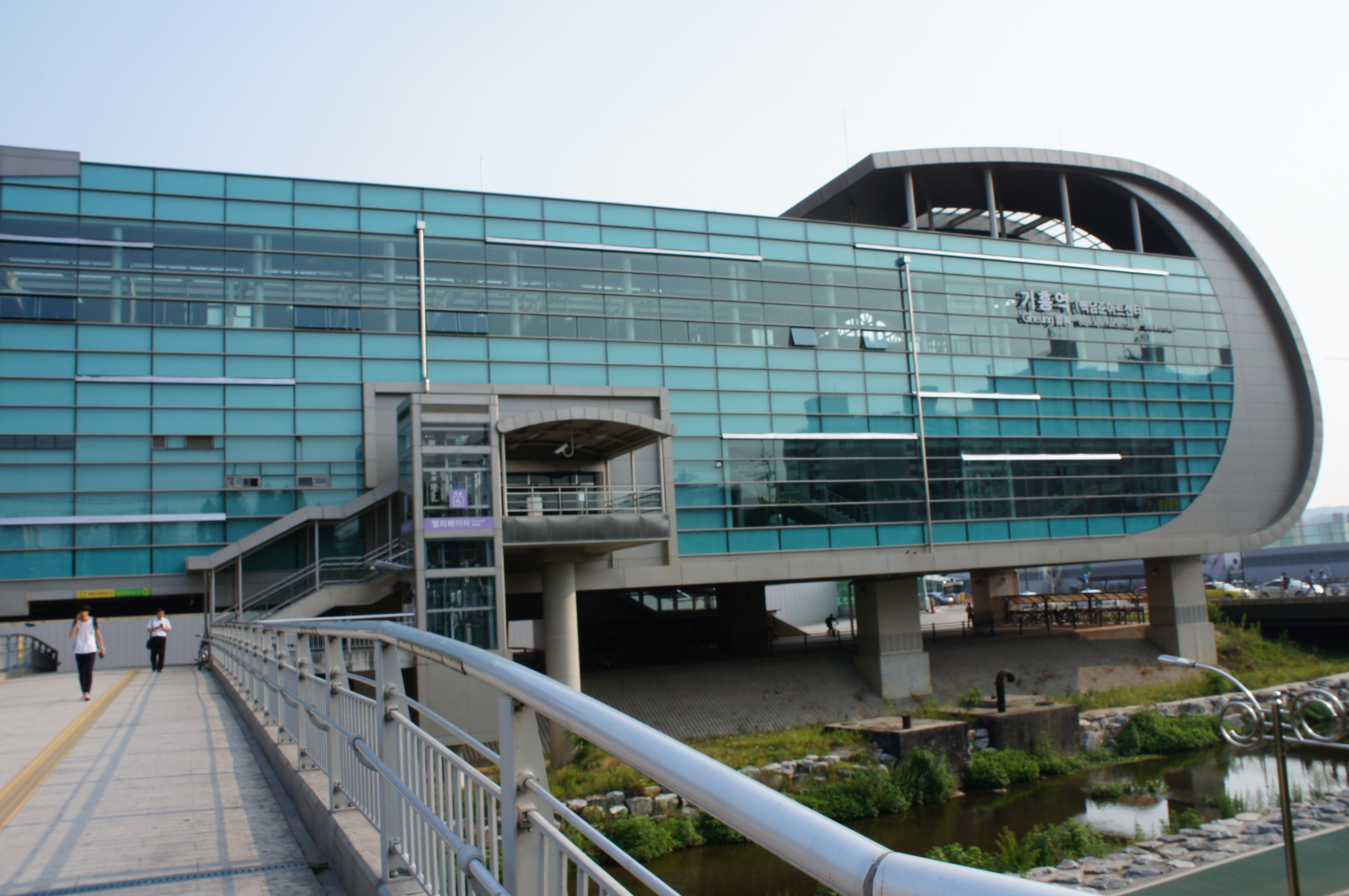
- The Everline station in 2014

Korean name
- Hangul: 기흥역
- Hanja: 器興驛
- Revised Romanization: Giheungnyeok
- McCune–Reischauer: Kihŭngnyŏk

General information
- Location: 227 Gugal-dong, Giheung-gu, Yongin-si, Gyeonggi-do
- Operator: Korail; Yongin EverLine Co,. Ltd. Neo Trans
- Lines: Suin–Bundang Line; EverLine
- Platforms: 5
- Tracks: 6

Key dates
- 28 December 2011: Suin–Bundang Line opened
- 26 April 2013: EverLine opened
Location

Giheung station is a subway station of the Suin–Bundang Line and the EverLine, in the city of Yongin, Gyeonggi Province.

It is a subway station and transfer station of the Suin-Bundang Line and the EverLine located in Gugal-dong, Giheung-gu, Yongin-si, Gyeonggi-do. 'Nam June Paik Art Center' is the subname of the station and is located 15 minutes away. It is currently the starting point of the EverLine. The EverLine is an above-ground section from this station to Jeondae-Everland. The Singalcheon River runs above this station on the Suin-Bundang Line of the Seoul Metropolitan Subway.

== Surrounding area ==
- Nam June Paik Art Center

== Gallery ==
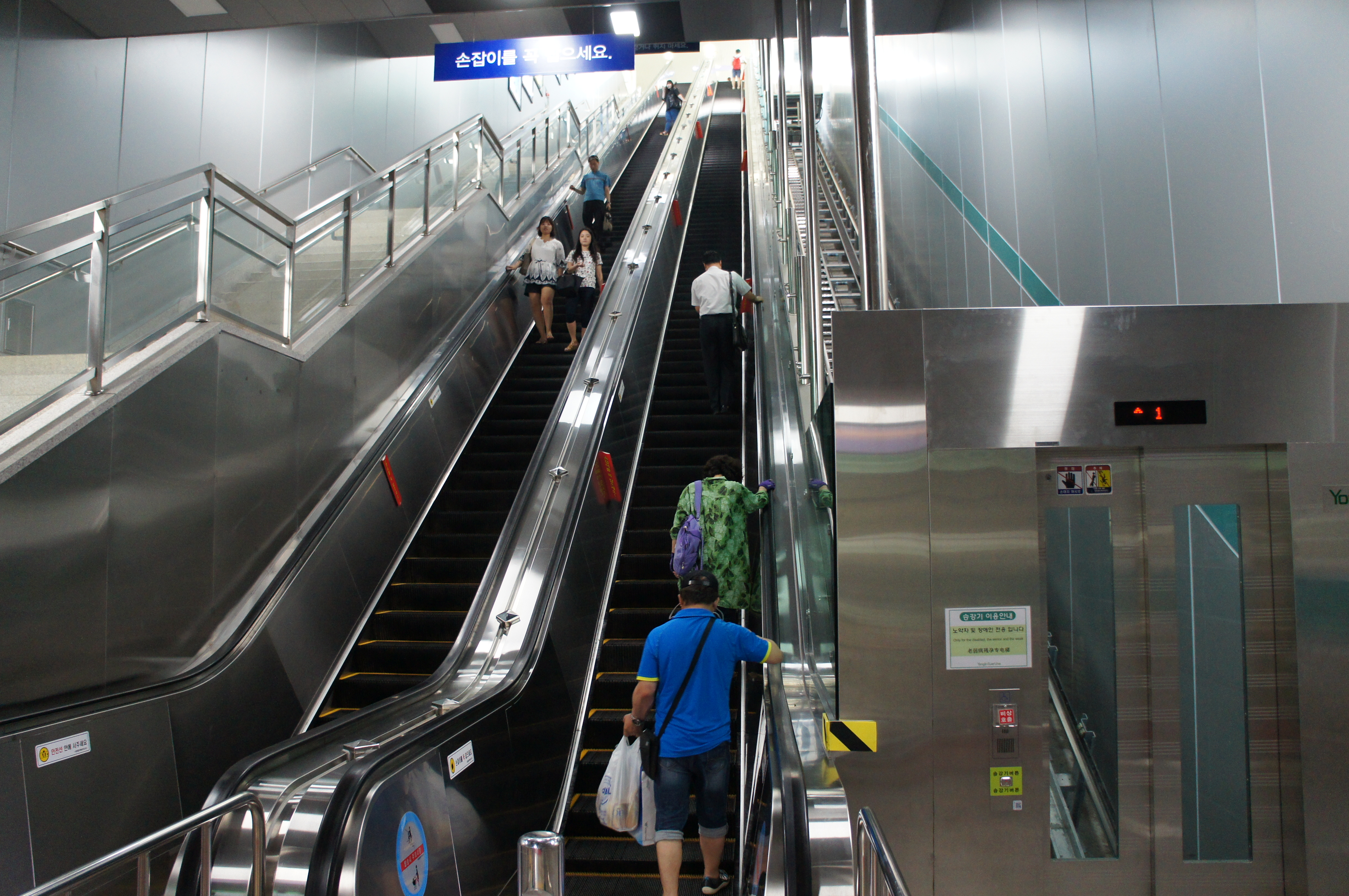
The escalators between the EverLine and the Suin-Bundang Line

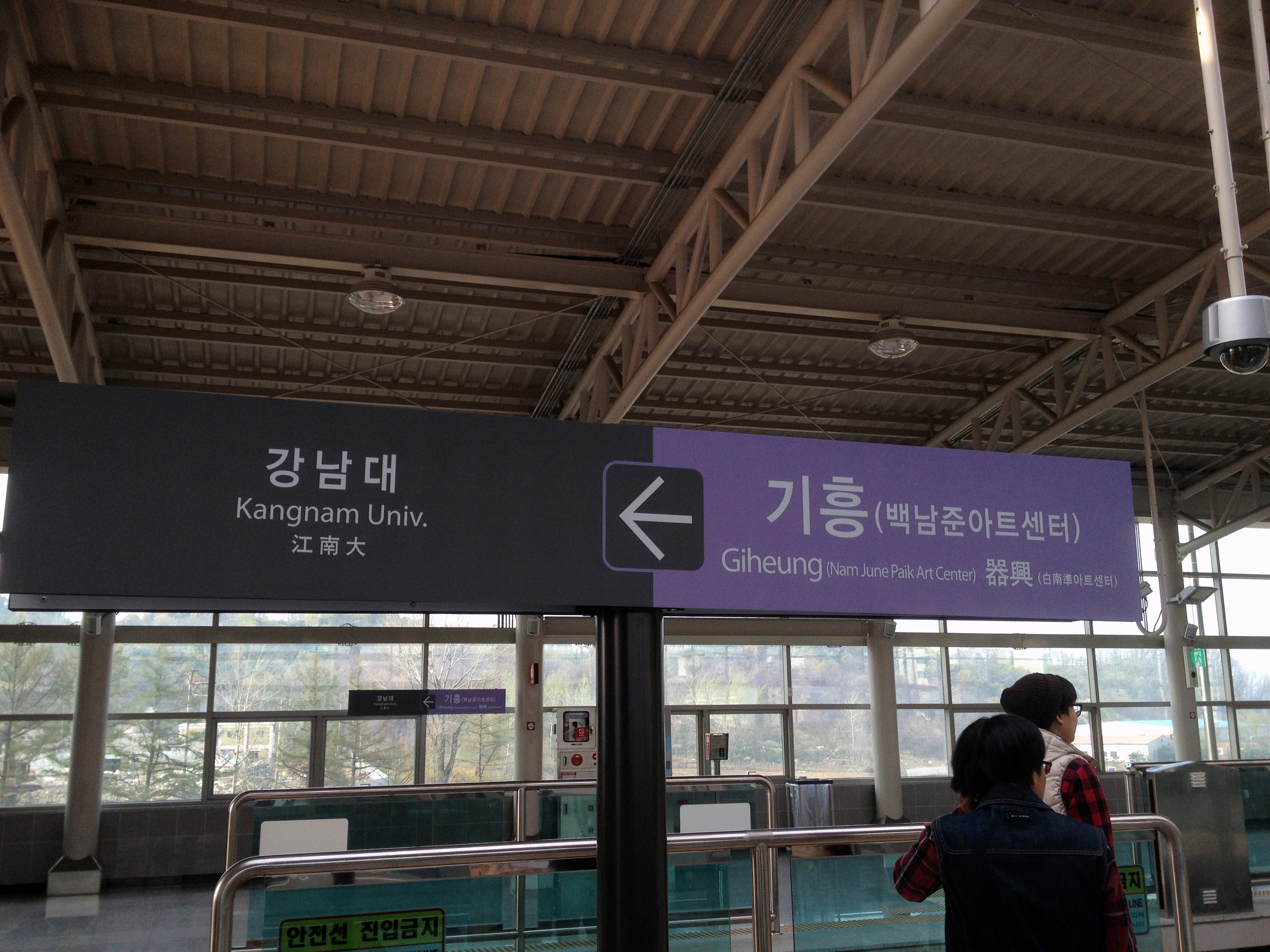
EverLine station name sign

| Preceding station | Seoul Metropolitan Subway | Following station |
|---|---|---|
| Singal towards Cheongnyangni | Suin–Bundang Line | Sanggal towards Incheon |
| Jukjeon towards Wangsimni | Suin–Bundang Line Bundang Express Line | Mangpo towards Gosaek |
| Terminus | EverLine | Kangnam University towards Jeondae–Everland |
