= Cheoin District =

District of Yongin, South Korea

Coordinates: 37.23444°N 127.201346°E

- Non-autonomous District
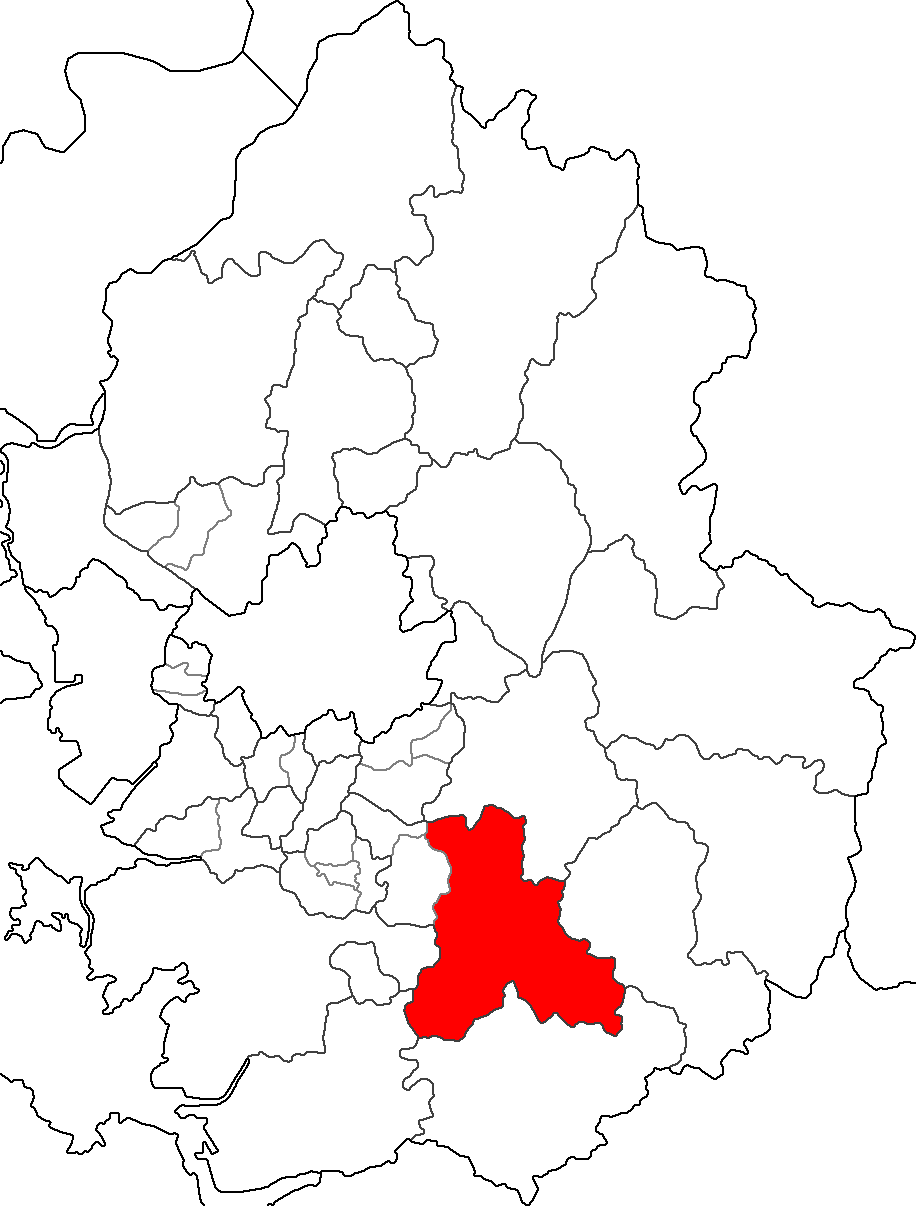
- Map of Gyeonggi highlighting Cheoin District.
- Country: South Korea
- Region: Sudogwon (Gijeon)
- Province: Gyeonggi
- City: Yongin

Population
  - Dialect: Seoul
- Website: Cheoin District Office

Korean name
- Hangul: 처인구
- Hanja: 處仁區
- RR: Cheoin-gu
- MR: Ch'ŏin-gu

Cheoin District (Korean: 처인구) is the largest gu in Yongin; it is located in the southeastern part of the city. It has four dong (neighborhoods), two eup (towns), and five myeon (townships).

== Under administrative districts ==
- Jungang-dong (divided into Gimnyangjang-dong and Namdong)
- Yeoksam-dong (combination of Yeokbuk-dong and Samga-dong)
- Yurim-dong (combination of Yubang-dong and Gorim-dong)
- Dongbu-dong (divided into Mapyeong-dong, Unhak-dong, Haegok-dong and Hodong)
- Pogok-eup
- Mohyeon-eup
- Yangji-myeon
- Wonsam-myeon
- Baegam-myeon
- Idong-eup
- Namsa-eup

== List of Gu in Yongin ==
- Cheoin District
- Giheung District
- Suji District

== Attractions ==
- In Gimnyangjang-dong, There was a battle between Turkish Brigade and Chinese People's Volunteer Army during Korean War.
- The MBC Dramia located within this gu at Yongcheon-ri, Baegam-myeon. The Dramia features functional reproductions of castles, palaces and even non-elite housing from various periods of Korean history, and thus serves the filming location of MBC's historical dramas, most notably, Jumong, Queen Seondeok, Dong Yi and The Moon Embracing the Sun. When there are no active shoots, viewing tours are available to the public, which include traditional folk games, historical court dress and archery.
