= Yongin =

City in Gyeonggi, South Korea

Coordinates: 37°14′N 127°12′E

- Specific city
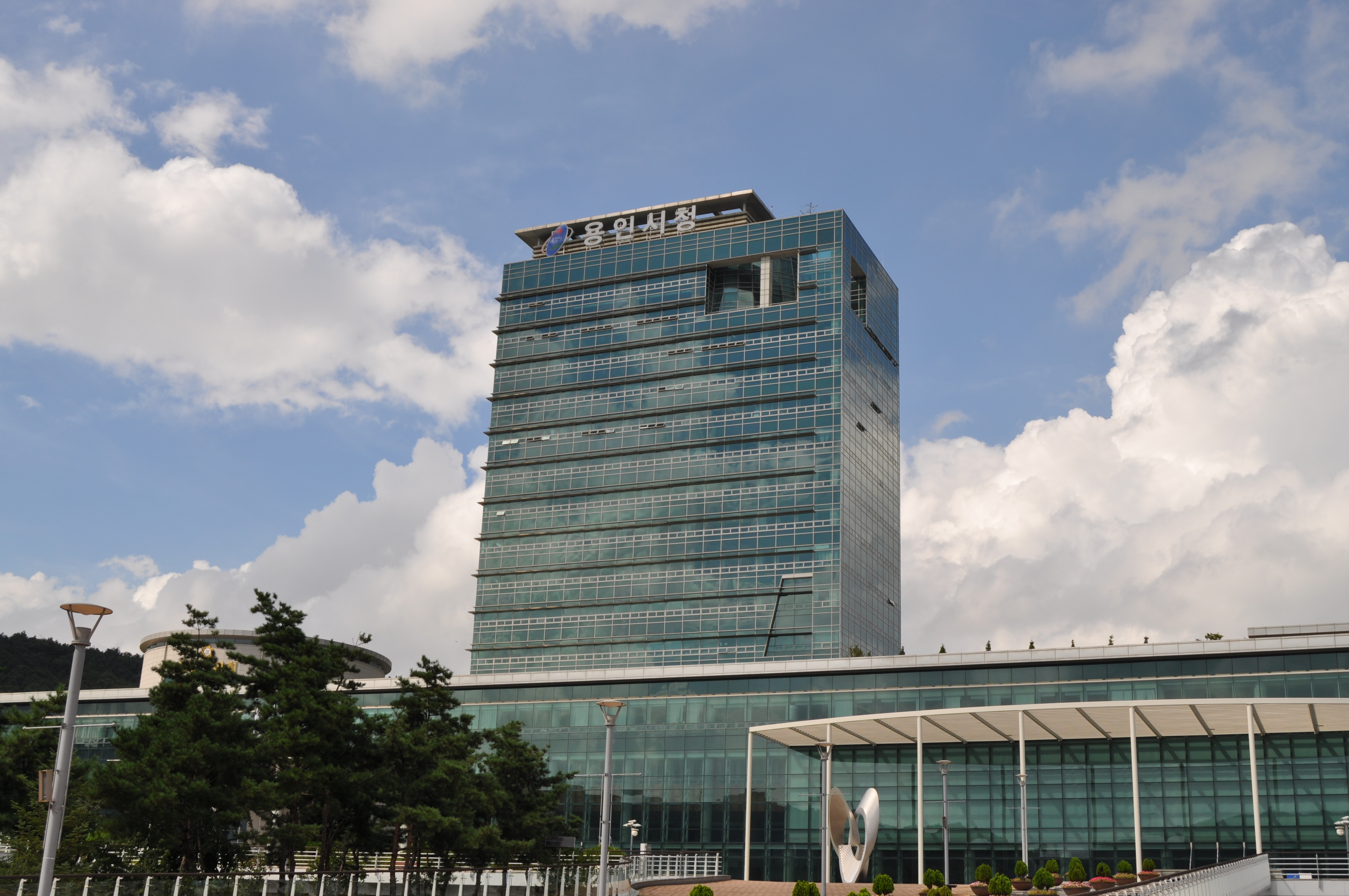

- Flag Emblem

- Location in South Korea
- Country: South Korea
- Region: Gyeonggi Province (Sudogwon)
- Administrative divisions: 3 gu, 4 eup, 3 myeon, 35 dong

Government
  - Type: Mayor-Council
  - Mayor: Lee Sang-il (이상일)
  - Council: Yongin City Council

Area
  - Total: 591.32 km^{2} (228.31 sq mi)

Population (October 2022)
  - Total: 1,076,369
  - Density: 1,860.44/km^{2} (4,818.5/sq mi)
  - Dialect: Gyeonggi
- Area code: +82-31-2xx
- Website: yongin.go.kr

Korean name
- Hangul: 용인시
- Hanja: 龍仁市
- RR: Yongin-si
- MR: Yongin-si

Yongin (Korean: 용인; Korean pronunciation: [joŋ.in]) is a city in the Seoul Metropolitan Area, the largest in Gyeonggi Province, South Korea. With a population over 1 million, the city has developed rapidly since the 21st century, recording the highest population growth of any city in the country. Yongin is a multi-nuclear city with multiple urban centers, not a single nuclear structure, and Giheung District crosses the Yeongdong Expressway and Dongbaek, while Suji District crosses Pungdeokcheon Stream and Jukjeon.

Yongin is a city almost as large as Seoul by area, consisting of the highly urbanized districts of Suji District and Giheung District and the semi-urbanized district of Cheoin District. Yongin's urbanized districts are located close to the capital and many commute to and from downtown Seoul in approximately 30–40 minutes by car using the Gyeongbu Expressway or Yongin-Seoul Expressway, the Bundang Line subway, the Shinbundang Line subway or metropolitan buses. The Shinbundang Line with a maximum speed of 110 km/h (68 mph) extended to Suji District in January 2016, which allows Suji residents to travel to Gangnam Station in 25 minutes. The Bundang Line extended south to Giheung Station in December 2011, connecting to EverLine that extends all the way to Everland. In December 2013, the Bundang Line extended to Suwon Station of Seoul Subway Line 1.

Yongin is home to Everland and Caribbean Bay, South Korea's most popular amusement and water parks. The city is also home to the Korean Folk Village, the largest of its kind. The 12,000-capacity Yongin Stadium and the 37,000-capacity Yongin Mireu Stadium are the largest sports venues in Yongin. Both stadiums are used mostly for football matches.

== History ==
Although there is evidence of human settlement here as far back as the fifth century, Yongin was granted city status only in March 1996.

- In 1979, Yongin-myeon was promoted to Yongin-eup under Presidential Decree No. 9409. In 1983, under Presidential Decree No. 11027, Yeosunae and Gasancheon basins of Jinae-myeon, which were merged into Suji-myeon during the Japanese colonial period, Iui-ri and Hari were incorporated into Suwon City, and Jinmok-ri and Bongmyeong-ri, part of Jinwicheon basin of Namsamyeon, were incorporated into Pyeongtaek City. In 1985, Giheung-myeon was promoted to Giheung-eup under Presidential Decree No. 11772. In 1995, 660,000 m^{2} of Yeongdeok-ri, Giheung-eup, were incorporated into Suwon City.

== Geography ==
Yongin has an inland location in the southern part of Gyeonggi province.

=== Climate ===
Yongin has a humid continental climate (Köppen: Dwa) due to its inland location. The average yearly temperature is 11.6 °C, the average temperature in January is -3.1 °C, the average temperature in August is 25.1 °C, and the average yearly precipitation is 1,300mm.

Climate data for Pogok-eup, Cheoin-gu, Yongin (1994–2020 normals)
Month	Jan	Feb	Mar	Apr	May	Jun	Jul	Aug	Sep	Oct	Nov	Dec	Year
Mean daily maximum °C (°F)	2.6 (36.7)	5.7 (42.3)	11.7 (53.1)	18.5 (65.3)	23.9 (75.0)	27.8 (82.0)	29.2 (84.6)	30.1 (86.2)	26.0 (78.8)	20.1 (68.2)	12.2 (54.0)	4.4 (39.9)	17.7 (63.9)
Daily mean °C (°F)	−3.1 (26.4)	−0.4 (31.3)	5.2 (41.4)	11.4 (52.5)	17.1 (62.8)	21.7 (71.1)	24.7 (76.5)	25.1 (77.2)	19.8 (67.6)	12.9 (55.2)	5.8 (42.4)	−1.3 (29.7)	11.6 (52.9)
Mean daily minimum °C (°F)	−8.5 (16.7)	−6.0 (21.2)	−1.0 (30.2)	4.9 (40.8)	10.9 (51.6)	16.5 (61.7)	21.0 (69.8)	21.3 (70.3)	15.3 (59.5)	7.4 (45.3)	0.5 (32.9)	−6.4 (20.5)	6.3 (43.3)
Average precipitation mm (inches)	17.2 (0.68)	31.6 (1.24)	40.3 (1.59)	75.6 (2.98)	89.4 (3.52)	123.5 (4.86)	374.6 (14.75)	290.3 (11.43)	130.7 (5.15)	50.1 (1.97)	47.2 (1.86)	21.4 (0.84)	1,291.9 (50.86)
Average precipitation days (≥ 0.1 mm)	4.3	4.1	5.9	7.2	7.2	7.6	13.6	13.0	8.3	5.0	7.1	5.6	88.9
Source: Korea Meteorological Administration

== Education ==
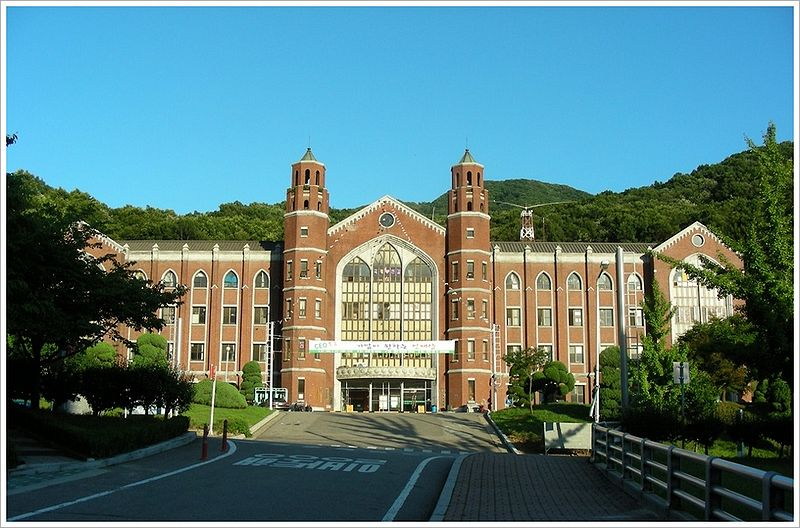
Student Center of Hankuk University of Foreign Studies Global Campus in Cheoin District

Yongin has many university campuses, namely Yong-In University, noted for its sports courses, Myongji University's Yongin Campus, Hankuk University of Foreign Studies' Global Campus, the Police University, Kangnam University (named for its former campus in Gangnam District, Seoul), Yong-in Songdam College, Dankook University and Calvin University.

== Economy ==
Yongin has a major tech industry, centered around memory chips and displays.

The city is home to Samsung Electronics' Giheung Campus in Giheung District. It is Samsung's first semiconductor fabrication plant, completed in 1983, and produces DRAM. In 2024, a new R&D center for the company was completed at a cost of 20 trillion KRW. Later in the year, the South Korean government approved of Samsung's plan to invest 300 trillion KRW in the southwest of the city to build the world's largest semiconductor cluster.

Yongin also hosts the headquarters of Samsung Display, the display subsidiary of Samsung Electronics, and Samsung SDI, the battery making subsidiary of Samsung Group. The Samsung Display's new headquarters were completed in 2024.

In 2025, leading memory chipmaker SK Hynix announced its four fabs built in the southeast of the city will receive investments totaling up to an unprecedented 600 trillion KRW to meet booming demand in artificial intelligence.

The two projects by South Korea's largest chipmakers will turn Yongin into the world's largest semiconductor hub.

Yongin also has a major tourism industry, with Everland theme park, Caribbean Bay water park, the Korean Folk Village, and Daejanggeum Park all being major attractions.

== Administrative districts ==
The city is divided into three gu (districts):

- Cheoin District
- Giheung District
- Suji District

== Demographics ==
Historical population
Year	Pop.	±% p.a.
1966	105,179	—
1970	96,551	−2.12%
1975	111,442	+2.91%
1980	135,537	+3.99%
1985	153,767	+2.56%
1990	187,975	+4.10%
1995	242,048	+5.19%
2000	384,741	+9.71%
2005	686,842	+12.29%
2010	847,138	+4.28%
2015	971,327	+2.77%
2020	1,089,087	+2.32%
2022	1,092,840	+0.17%

Yongin's population surpassed the 1 million mark in 2017.

== Transportation ==
Yongin is served by trains on the Seoul Metropolitan Subway. The Bundang Line has been extended into Yongin, calling at Jukjeon, Bojeong, Guseong, Singal, Giheung and Sanggal stations; and it has been extended towards Suwon Station, in Suwon. Since May 2013 a new line named the EverLine Rapid Transit System is in operation and linked to the Bundang Line at Giheung Station where it is possible to transfer between lines without going outside. From 2016 onwards, the inner Suji area will also be served by four new Shinbundang Line stations, which will allow Suji residents travel to Gangnam Station in less than 30 minutes. An extension from Gangnam to Sinsa station, began construction in 2016 and was opened on May 28, 2022.

The GTX higher-speed rail serves Yongin through Guseong Station, which the GTX-A line runs through. It was completed in 2025.

Yongin has an intercity bus terminal in the city center, though the densely settled northern areas are served better by the terminal in Yatap-dong, Seongnam.

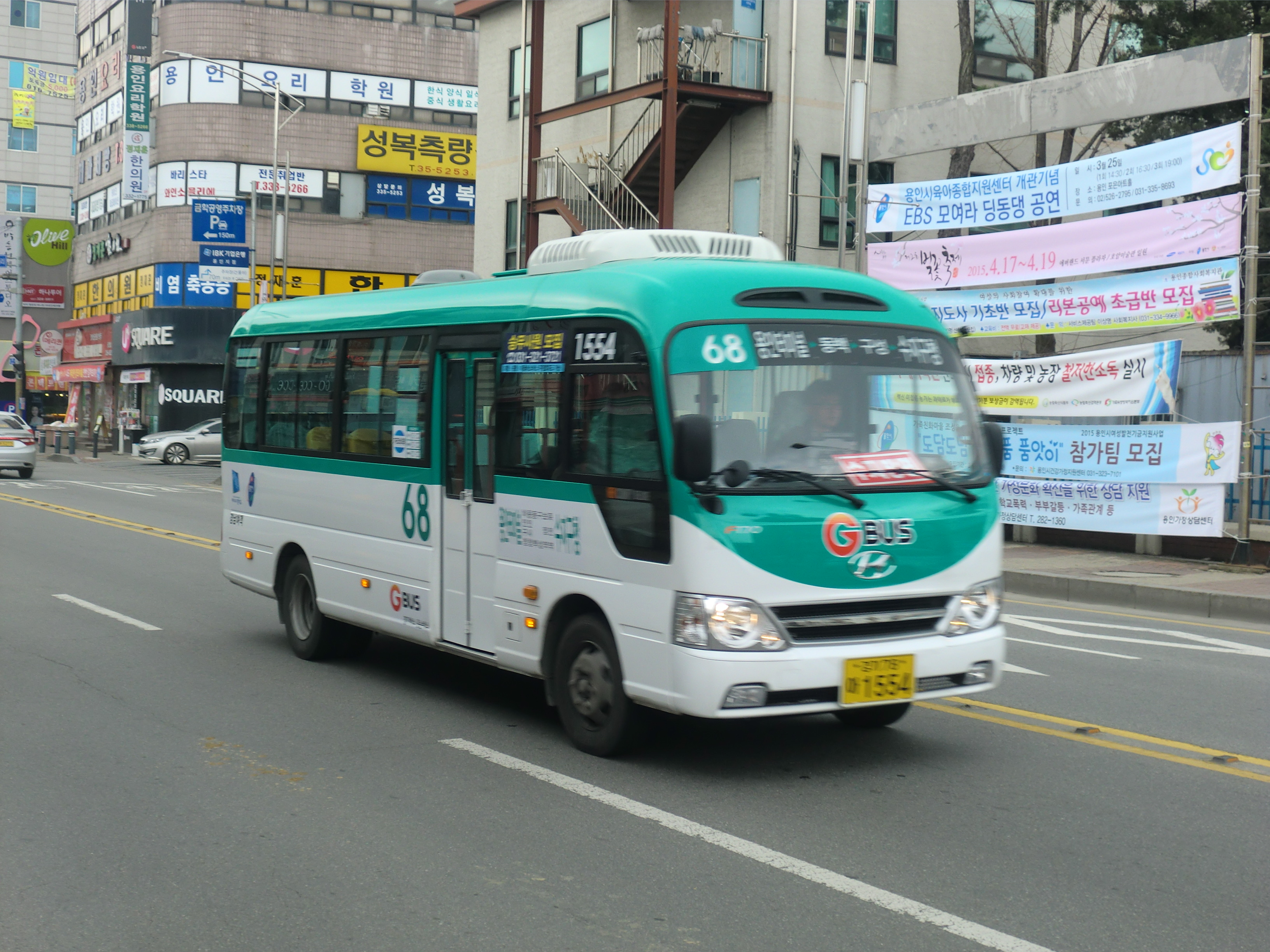
A city bus in Yongin

== Food ==
Yongin's most famous food is the Sundae of Baekam-myeon, Chouin-gu. Baekamsundae has a special feature of filling meat without blood.

== Sports ==
Yongin is the home of the WKBL women's basketball team Yongin Samsung Life Blueminx and the K League 2 football club Yongin FC. The city is also home to the Yongin Football Center.

The Yongin Mireu Stadium, home of Yongin FC, is the largest stadium in the city. Suwon Samsung Bluewings have also used the venue as their temporary home ground when the Suwon World Cup Stadium was unavailable.

== Sister cities ==
City	Region	Country	Year
Fullerton	California	United States	
Yangzhou	Jiangsu	China	
	Fergana Region	Uzbekistan	2008
Kota Kinabalu	Sabah	Malaysia	2000
Kayseri	Kayseri Province	Turkey	
Redland City	Queensland	Australia	
Williamson County	Texas	United States	2024

== Notable people from Yongin ==
- Lee Moo-saeng – actor
- Eunkwang – singer and actor, member of K-pop group BtoB
- Sungjae – singer and actor, member of K-pop group BtoB
- Hyungsik – singer and actor, member of K-pop group ZE:A
- Bomin – singer and actor, member of K-pop group Golden Child
- Mino – rapper and producer, member of K-pop group Winner
- Sungyeol – singer and actor, member of K-pop group Infinite
- Chan – singer and actor, member of K-pop group iKon
- Changbin – rapper, singer and producer, member of K-pop group Stray Kids and producing team 3Racha
- Yoon Do-young – football player
- Kim Do-hoon – actor
- Lee Jong-suk – actor, model

== Attractions ==
- Everland theme park
- Caribbean Bay water park
- Korean Folk Village
- Yongin Daejanggeum Park, previously known as MBC Dramia (MBC 드라미아), located at Cheoin District, is the filming location of historical dramas such as Moon Embracing the Sun, Jumong, Queen Seondeok and Dong Yi. Viewing tours are available, which includes traditional folk games, historical court dress and archery.

== Gallery ==
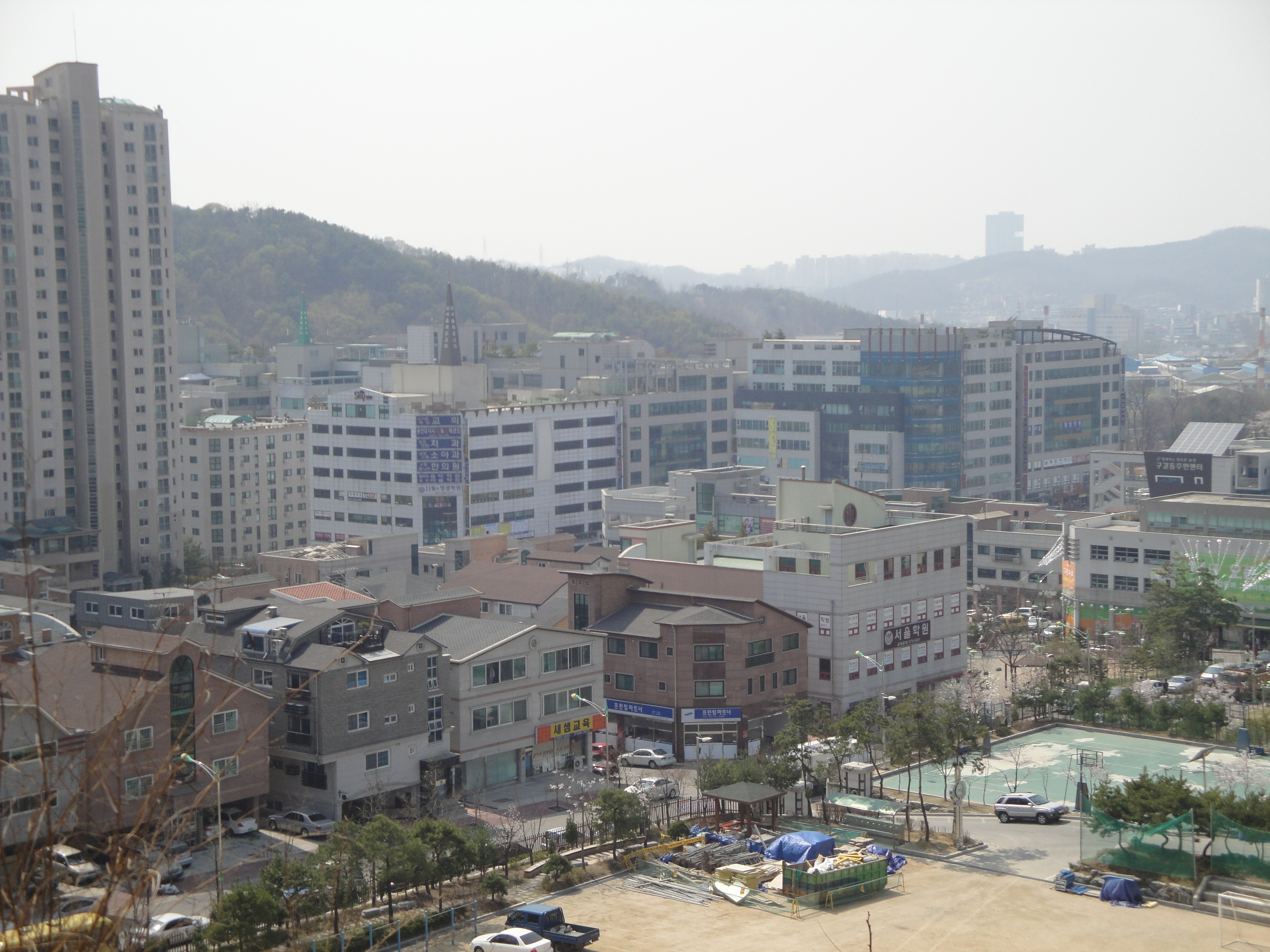
Gugal-dong Yongin

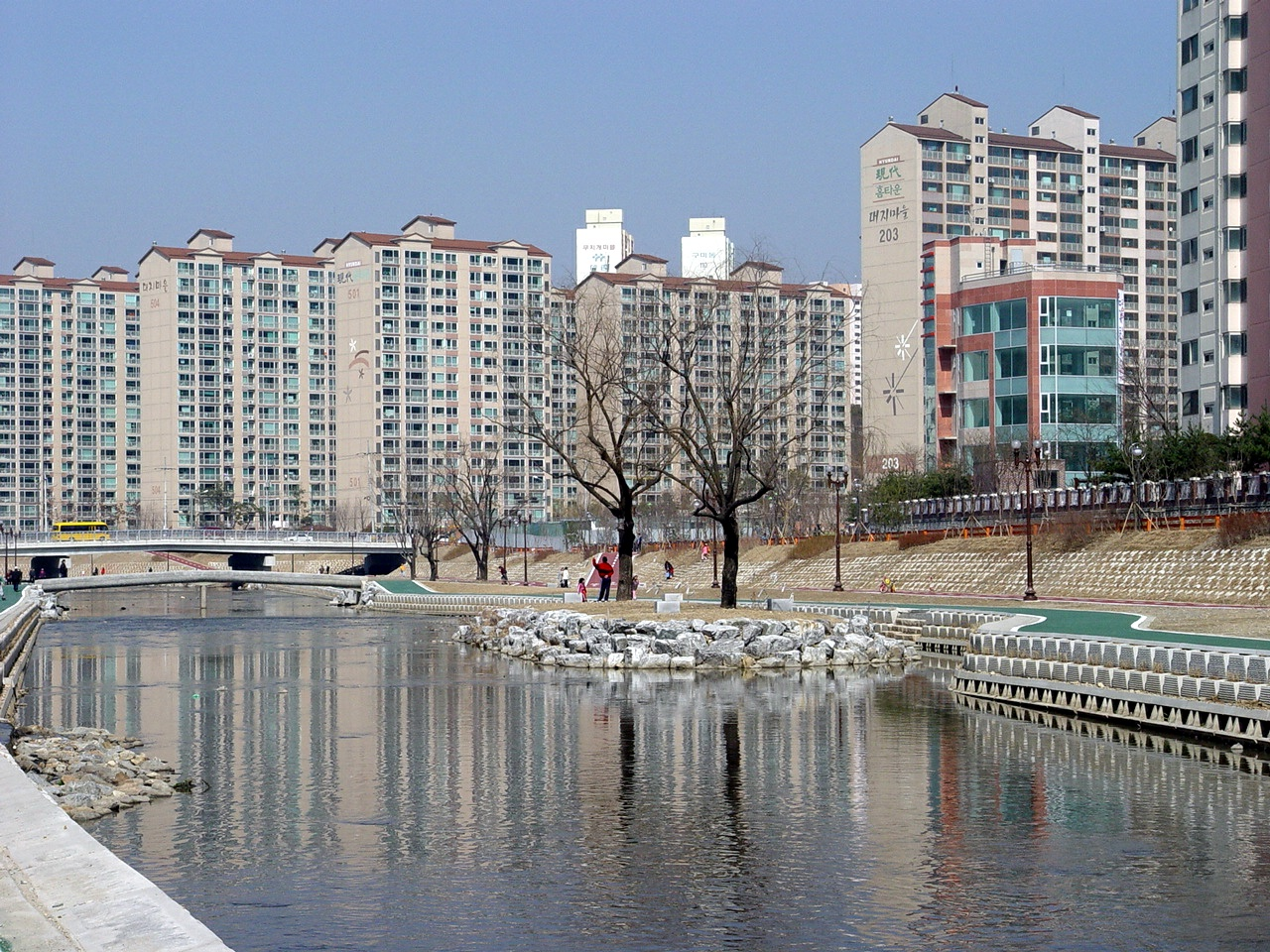
Tancheon

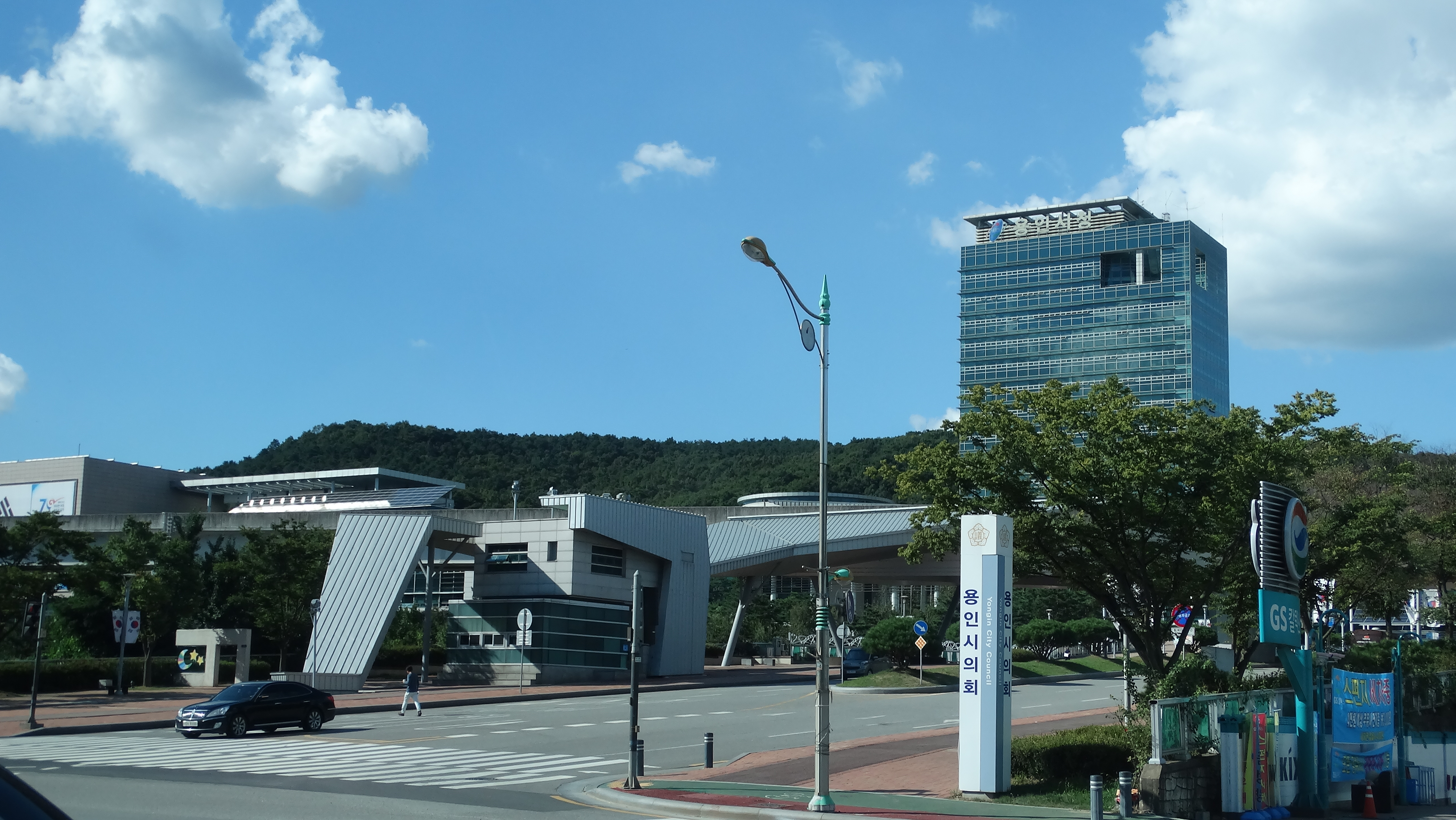
Overall view of Yongin city hall

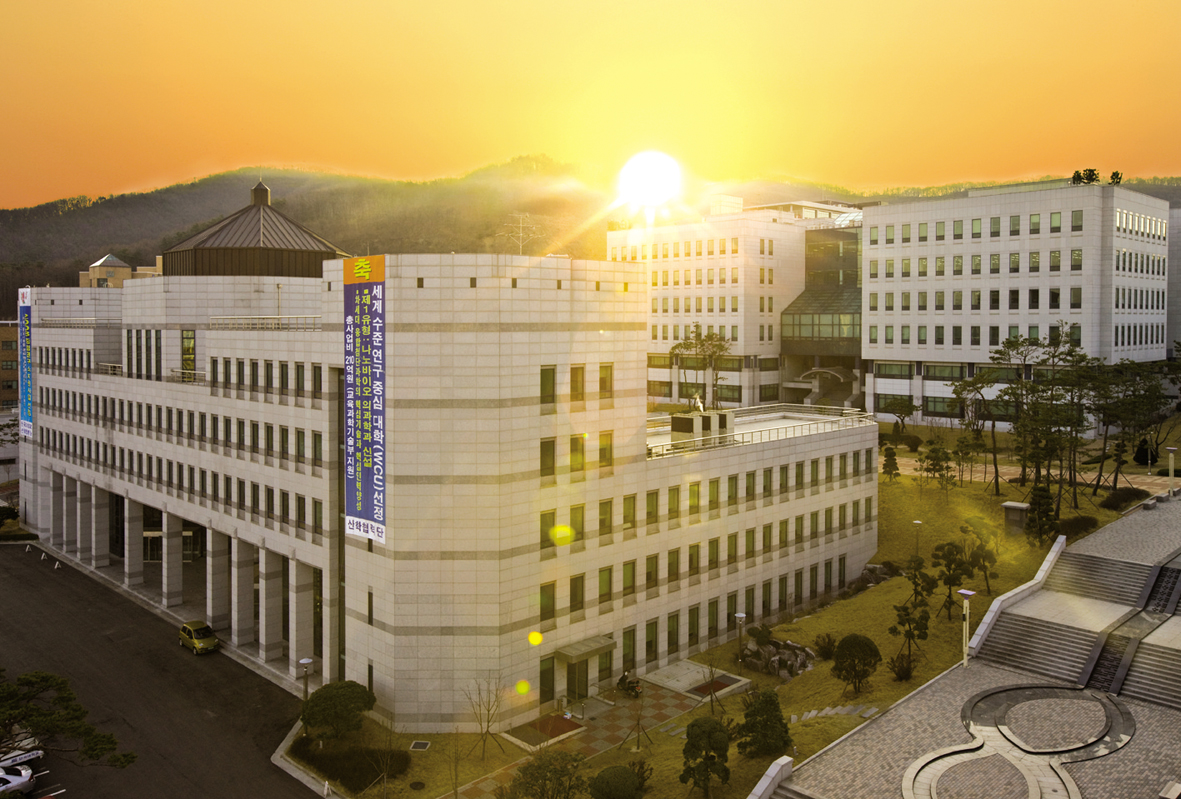
Dankook University

== See also ==
- List of cities in South Korea
