= Neo Trans =

South Korean transport company

- Native name: 네오트랜스
- Type: Privately held company
- Industry: Railroad transportation
- Founded: Seongnam, South Korea (1 June 2005)
- Founder: Park Tae-su
- Headquarters: Seongnam, South Korea
- Area served: Seoul, Bundang
- Key people: Park Tae-su
- Products: Shinbundang Line, EverLine
- Parent: Doosan
- Website: neotrans.kr

Neo Trans (Korean: 네오트랜스) is a transportation company operating the Shinbundang Line and the EverLine station facilities. Shinbundang line's train station facilities are operated by a company of the same name - Shinbundang Line. The company currently belongs to Doosan Group. A disposal of Neo Trans was proposed, but it was canceled.

== See also ==
- Shinbundang Line
- Bundang Line
