= Conan of Cimmeria (disambiguation) =

Conan of Cimmeria may refer to:

- Conan the Barbarian, the character
- Conan of Cimmeria, the 1969 Lancer Books collection
- Conan of Cimmeria (1932-1936), the 2000s Wandering Star collections
  - Conan of Cimmeria: Volume One (1932–1933), the 2002 Wandering Star collection
  - Conan of Cimmeria: Volume Two (1934), the 2004 Wandering Star collection
  - Conan of Cimmeria: Volume Three (1935–1936), the 2009 Wandering Star collection

== See also ==
- Cimmeria (disambiguation)
- Conan (disambiguation)
- Conan the Cimmerian (disambiguation)
- Conan the Adventurer (disambiguation)
- Conan the Barbarian (disambiguation)
- Conan the Conqueror (disambiguation)
- Conan the Destroyer (disambiguation)
