= Conan =

Conan may refer to:

== People ==
- Saint Conan (died 684), bishop of the Isle of Man
- Conan of Cornwall (c. 930 – c. 950), bishop of Cornwall
- Conan I of Rennes (died 992), duke of Brythonic Brittany
- Conan II of Brittany (died 1066), duke of Brittany
- Conan III of Brittany (died 1148), duke of Brittany
- Conan IV of Brittany (1138–1171), duke of Brittany
- Georges Conan (1913–2000), French cyclist
- Laure Conan (1845–1924), pen name of Marie-Louise-Félicité Angers, French-Canadian female novelist
- Neal Conan (1949–2021), American radio journalist
- Conan Anthony Mohan Jayamaha (1949–1992), Sri Lankan Sinhala Navy Admiral
- Conan Byrne, (born 1985), Irish footballer
- Conan Gray (born 1998), American singer-songwriter, YouTuber and social media personality
- Conan O'Brien (born 1963), American talk show host
- Conan Stevens, Australian actor, writer, stuntman and former professional wrestler
- Arthur Conan Doyle (1859–1930), British writer

== Mythical and legendary people ==
- Conan Meriadoc, Brythonic king of Dumnonia (Cornwall, Brittany)
- Conán mac Morna, fian warrior
- Conán mac Lia, fian warrior and son of Liath Luachra
- Conand (mythology), Fomorian leader

== Characters ==
- Conan the Barbarian, a character created by Robert E. Howard, appearing in many different media
- Conan the Librarian, a perennial parody of Robert E. Howard's Conan the Barbarian that has appeared in many different media
- Conan Edogawa, pseudonym of Shinichi Kudo, the protagonist of the manga franchise Detective Conan
- Admiral Conan Antonio Motti, a character in the film Star Wars: Episode IV: A New Hope
- Captain Conan in the book of the same name, and the Capitaine Conan movie on which it is based

== Video games ==
- Conan: Hall of Volta, 1984 video game for PC-88, Apple II, Atari 8-bit and Commodore 64
- Conan: The Mysteries of Time, also known as Myth: History in the Making, 1991
- Conan (2004 video game), for the PC and Xbox, GameCube, and PS2 consoles
- Conan (2007 video game), for the Xbox 360 and PS3 consoles
- Age of Conan: Unchained, 2008
- Conan Exiles, 2018 survival video game

== Pen and paper games ==
- Conan Unchained! and Conan Against Darkness!, two 1984 pen-and-paper role-playing game supplement adventures for the Dungeons & Dragons roleplaying game system
- Conan Role-Playing Game, 1985 pen-and-paper role-playing game from TSR, using a different system than the 1984 supplements
- GURPS Conan, a 1988–1989 line of supplement adventures for the GURPS pen-and-paper role-playing game system, published by Steve Jackson Games
- Conan: The Roleplaying Game, a 2004 pen-and-paper role-playing game, by Mongoose Publishing
- Conan: Adventures in an Age Undreamed Of, 2017 pen-and-paper role-playing game, by the Modiphius Entertainment

== Television ==
- Conan (talk show), American late night talk show hosted by Conan O'Brien
- Future Boy Conan, a 1978 anime series
- Conan the Adventurer (1992 TV series), American-French-Canadian animated television series
- Conan and the Young Warriors, 1994 American animated television series
- Detective Conan (TV series), an ongoing anime series starting in 1996 based on the long-running manga of the same name
- Conan the Adventurer (1997 TV series), aka Conan, an American television series starring Ralf Möller

== Films ==
- Conan the Barbarian (1982 film), based on the character created by Robert E. Howard
- Conan the Destroyer (1984), a sequel to the 1982 film, Conan the Barbarian
- Conan the Barbarian (2011 film), a reboot of the Conan films
- The Legend of Conan, a sequel proposed in 2012 to the 1982 film Conan the Barbarian

== Books and comics ==
- The Constitution of the United States of America: Analysis and Interpretation (CONAN), popularly known as the Constitution Annotated
- Conan (books), stories and books by Robert E. Howard and others
  - Conan (collection), a collection of short stories
- Conan (comics), adaptations of the Robert E. Howard origination
  - Conan (Marvel Comics), titles published by Marvel from 1970
  - Conan (Dark Horse Comics), numerous comics published by Dark Horse from 2003

== Other uses ==
- Conan, Loir-et-Cher, France
- Conan (band), a doom metal band from Liverpool, UK, founded in 2006
- Conan (military dog), a military working dog that participated in the Barisha raid, which resulted in the death of ISIS leader Abu Bakr al-Baghdadi
- Conan (Javier Milei's dog), a pet dog of Argentine economist, politician and current president Javier Milei, who was cloned multiple times after his death

== See also ==
- Aurelius Conanus, legendary King of the Britons
- Conan the Adventurer (disambiguation)
- Conan the Barbarian (disambiguation)
- Conan the Cimmerian (disambiguation)
- Conan the Conqueror (disambiguation)
- Conan the Destroyer (disambiguation)
- Conan of Cimmeria (disambiguation)
- Conand (disambiguation)
- Connan, a surname
- Conon (disambiguation)
- Konan (disambiguation)
