= Konon =

Konon is a masculine given name, the transliteration from the Cyrillic-alphabet spelling 'Конон' of the given name Conon (Greek: Κόνων). It gave rise to patronymic surnames Kononenko, Kononov, Kononovich, Kononowicz. Notable people with the name include:

- Konon Berman-Yurin
- Konon Durakov (1798–1884), Russian Orthodox bishop
- Konon Molody
- Konon Zotov
