= Adventurer (disambiguation) =

An adventurer is a person who adventures.

Adventurer may also refer to:

- An archaic term for a shareholder of a joint-stock company, such as the Virginia Company of London
- Adventurers' Act, a 1642 Act of the English Parliament intended to stop the "rebellion" in Ireland
- Adventure Air Adventurer, an American flying boat design
- Adventurers (land drainage), groups of engineers and landowners who funded large-scale drainage projects in return for land
- Adventurers (Seventh-day Adventist), a program for children of the Seventh-Day Adventist Church
- Adventurers!, a webcomic
- Adventurer (board game)
- DeSoto Adventurer, an automobile
- Lego Adventurers, a Lego theme
- Triumph Adventurer 900, a motorcycle
- MS Stena Adventurer, two ferries
- Adventurer (film), a 1942 Swedish film
- Adventurer, a 1986 television miniseries starring Oliver Tobias

== See also ==
- The Adventurer (disambiguation)
- The Adventurers (disambiguation)
- Conan the Adventurer (disambiguation)
