= Kononovich =

Kononovich is a Russian-language patronymic surname derived from the given name Konon. Polish equivalent: Kononowicz, Belarusian: Kananovich, Ukrainian: Kononovych. Notable people with the surname include:

- Aleksandr Kononovich (1850–1910), Russian astronomer, the namesake of the minor planet 8322 Kononovich
- German Kononovich (died 1737), archimandrite of the Trinity-Ilyinsky Monastery of the Chernigov Diocese of the Russian Orthodox Church .
- Kazimir Kononovich (1823—1897), Russian Imperial Army general
- Iosif Kononovich (1863—1921), Russian Imperial Army general
- Sergey Kononovich, Belarusian musician form band Krambambula
