= The Adventurer =

The Adventurer may refer to:

== Film and television ==
- The Adventurer (1917 film), a short comedy film written and directed by Charlie Chaplin
- The Adventurer (1920 film), a silent drama film directed by J. Gordon Edwards
- The Adventurer (1922 film), a German silent film directed by Lothar Mendes
- The Adventurer (1928 film), an American adventure film directed by Viktor Tourjansky and W.S. Van Dyke
- The Adventurer: The Curse of the Midas Box, a 2014 British film
- The Adventurer (TV series), a 1972 British TV series

=== Television episodes ===
- "The Adventurer", The Forest Rangers season 2, episode 25 (1964)
- "The Adventurer", Van der Valk series 1, episode 6 (1972)

== Literature ==
- The Adventurer; or, The Wreck on the Indian Ocean, an 1848 novel by Maturin Murray Ballou
- The Adventurer, a 1907 novel by Lloyd Osbourne
- The Adventurer, reissue title of But Never Free, a 1937 novel by Barbara Cartland
- The Adventurer, a 1940 novel by Anthony Gilbert under the pen name Anne Meredith
- The Adventurer (novel), a 1948 novel by author Mika Waltari
- "The Adventurer", a 1953 short story by Cyril M. Kornbluth
- The Adventurer, a 1973 novel based on the TV series by John Burke writing as Robert Miall
- The Adventurer, a 1977 novel by Barbara Cartland
- The Adventurer, a 1990 novel by Jayne Ann Krentz; the second installment in the Ladies and Legends trilogy
- The Adventurer, a 2002 novel by Jaclyn Reding; the second installment in The Highland Heroes series

== Other uses ==
- The Adventurer (magazine), a games magazine from LucasArts
- The Adventurer (newspaper), an English 18th century newspaper
- The Adventurer (album), an album by saxophonist Clifford Jordan

== See also ==
- The Adventurer's, a 1980 Hong Kong TV series
- The Adventurers (disambiguation)
- Adventurers (disambiguation)
- Adventurer (disambiguation)
- Conan the Adventurer (disambiguation)
