= Conan the Cimmerian =

Conan the Cimmerian may refer to:

- Conan the Barbarian, Robert E. Howard's fictional character
- Conan the Cimmerian (comics), Dark Horse Comics series about that character
- Conan the Cimmerian (video game), a 1991 home computer game
- The Coming of Conan the Cimmerian, an anthology collection of Robert E. Howard's short stories

== See also ==
- Conan (disambiguation)
- Conan of Cimmeria (disambiguation)
- Conan the Adventurer (disambiguation)
- Conan the Barbarian (disambiguation)
- Conan the Conqueror (disambiguation)
- Conan the Destroyer (disambiguation)
- Cimmeria (disambiguation)
