= Conon (disambiguation) =

Conon (5th-4th c. BCE) was an Athenian general at the end of the Peloponnesian War.

Conon or Konon (Greek: Κόνων) may also refer to:

== People ==
=== Greek name ===
- Conon of Samos (c. 280 BCE–c. 220 BCE), Greek astronomer and mathematician
- Conon of Tarsus, 6th-century bishop and leader of the heretical Tritheist movement
- Conon (mythographer), 1st-century BCE Greece
- Conon (Byzantine general) (died 548), Byzantine general killed by his own troops
- Pope Conon (died 687)
- Leo III the Isaurian (c. 685–741), born Konon, Byzantine Emperor

=== Germanic name ===
- Conon, Count of Montaigu (died 1106), Lotharingian nobleman and military leader of the First Crusade
- Conon, Count of Montaigu and Duras (fl. 1189)
- Conon de Béthune (c. 1150–1219), French crusader and "trouvère"
- Hans Conon von der Gabelentz (1807–1874), German minister and linguist

== Catholic and Orthodox saints ==
- Conon of Isauria, 2nd-century miracle worker and martyr from Isauria
- Conon of Perga or Conon the Gardener (died c. 250), from Perga in Asia Minor
- Conon and Conon (died 275), 3rd-century saints, father and son martyrs
- Conon the Baptizer or Conon of Penthucla/of the Jordan (died c. 555)
- Conon of Rome (?–?), martyr, drowned at sea; feast day 5 June
- Conon of Naso (1139–1236), Italian abbot and saint; feast day 27 March

== Places ==
- Conon, Lutwyche, a heritage-listed house in Brisbane, Queensland, Australia
- Conon Bridge, a village in the Highland region of Scotland
- River Conon, a river in the Highlands of Scotland

== Astronomy ==
- Conon (crater), a lunar crater
- 12153 Conon, an asteroid

== See also ==
- Konon
- Conan (disambiguation)
- Connan, a surname
- Konan (disambiguation)
