= Kononov =

Kononov (masculine), Kononova (feminine) is a Russian patronymic surname derived from the given name Konon (Conon). Notable people with the surname include:

- Aleksandr Kononov, lay name of bishop Nikodim
- Elena Kononova, Russian soccer player
- Eva Kononova (born 2009), Russian rhythmic gymnast
- Igor Kononov
- Ivan Kononov (1900 – 1967), Cossack Red Army commander and later a collaborator with Nazi Germany
- Lyubov Kononova, Kazakhstani track and field hurdler
- Lyudmila Kononova, Russian lawyer and politician
- Maria Kononova, Russian tennis player
- Mikhail Kononov
- Mykyta Kononov
- Nikolay Kononov
- Oleg Kononov
- Oleksandra Kononova, Ukrainian Paralympic skier
- Vassili Kononov
- Vitaliy Kononov
- Vladimir Kononov (politician) (born 1958), Russian politician
- Vladimir Kononov (skier) (born 1972), Russian cross-country skier and Paralympian
- Vladimir Kononov (Donetsk People's Republic) (born 1974), ex-defence minister of the self-proclaimed Donetsk People's Republic
- Vyacheslav Kononov
