= Kononenko =

Kononenko (Ukrainian: Кононенко) is a surname. It may refer to:

- Anatoly Kononenko (born 1935), Soviet sprint canoer
- Andriy Kononenko (born 1974), Ukrainian footballer
- Dmitry Kononenko (born 1988), Ukrainian chess grandmaster
- Elena Kononenko, Ukrainian swimmer
- Ihor Kononenko (born 1965), Ukrainian businessman and politician
- Kirill Kononenko (born 1992), Russian ice hockey player
- Matvey Kononenko (1900–1977), Soviet general
- Maxim Kononenko (born 1971), Russian journalist and TV show host
- Mykhaylo Kononenko (born 1987), Ukrainian road cyclist
- Natalia Kononenko (born 1994), Ukrainian gymnast
- Natalie Kononenko, Canadian professor of folklore
- Oleg Grigoriyevich Kononenko (1938–1980), Soviet cosmonaut
- Oleg Kononenko (born 1964), Russian cosmonaut
- Roman Kononenko (born 1981), Ukrainian track cyclist
- Tatiana Kononenko (born 1978), Ukrainian chess player
- Valeriya Kononenko (born 1990), Ukrainian racing cyclist
- Vladimir Kononenko (born 1971), Russian footballer
