= Connan =

Connan is a surname. Notable people with the surname include:

- François Connan (1508–1551), French humanist jurist
- Konnan (born 1964), the ring name of Charles Ashenoff, American pro-wrestler and rapper
- Tom Connan (born 1995), singer and actor.

== See also ==
- Connan Mockasin, New Zealand musician
- Saint-Connan, a commune in the Côtes-d'Armor department of Brittany in northwestern France
- Conan (disambiguation)
