= Kononowicz =

Kononowicz is a Polish-language patronymic surname derived from the given name Konon. Notable people with the surname include:

- Krzysztof Kononowicz (1963–2025), Polish social activist
- Maciej Kononowicz (born 1988), Polish footballer
