= Conan the Destroyer (disambiguation) =

Conan the Destroyer is a 1984 film starring Arnold Schwarzenegger.

Conan the Destroyer may also refer to:

- Conan the Barbarian, the fictional character created by Robert E. Howard
- Conan the Destroyer (comics), a comic book based on the film
- Conan the Destroyer (novel), a novelization of the film by Robert Jordan
- The Destroyer (painting), a 1971 painting of Conan by Frank Frazetta

== See also ==
- Conan (disambiguation)
- Conan the Adventurer (disambiguation)
- Conan the Barbarian (disambiguation)
- Conan the Cimmerian (disambiguation)
- Conan the Conqueror (disambiguation)
