= The Adventurers =

The Adventurers may refer to:

== Film ==
- The Adventurers (1926 film), a German silent film
- The Adventurers (1951 film), a British adventure film
- The Adventurers (1970 film), an American film based on the novel by Harold Robbins
- The Adventurers (1995 film), a Hong Kong film starring Andy Lau, Jacklyn Wu, and Rosamund Kwan
- The Adventurers (2014 film), a Russian adventure film
- The Adventurers (2017 film), a Hong Kong film starring Andy Lau and Shu Qi

== Literature ==
- The Adventurers (French: Les Aventuriers), an 1863 novel by Gustave Aimard
- The Adventurers: A Tale of Treasure Trove, an 1899 novel by H. B. Marriott Watson
- The Adventurers, a 1954 novel by Ernest Haycox
- The Adventurers, a 1965 novel by Jane Aiken Hodge
- The Adventurers, a 1966 novel by Harold Robbins, the basis of the 1970 film
- The Adventurers, a 1983 novel by Vivian Stuart under the pen name William Stuart Long; the fifth volume in the Australians series

== Other uses ==
- "The Adventurers", The Adventures of Ozzie and Harriet season 11, episode 18 (1963)
- The Adventurers (Ral Partha), a set of fantasy miniatures designed by Tom Meier

== See also ==
- The Adventurer's, a Hong Kong television series
- Adventurers (disambiguation)
- Adventurer (disambiguation)
- The Adventurer (disambiguation)
