= Conan the Barbarian (disambiguation) =

Conan the Barbarian is a character created by Robert E. Howard.

Conan the Barbarian may also refer to:

- Conan the Barbarian fictional universe, see Hyborian Age
- Conan the Barbarian (1955 collection), a 1955 collection of stories about the character published by Gnome Press
- Conan the Barbarian (comics), 1970s Marvel comic series
- Conan the Barbarian (1982 film), a film starring Arnold Schwarzenegger
  - Conan the Barbarian (1982 novel), a novelization of the 1982 film
- Conan the Barbarian (2011 film), a film starring Jason Momoa
  - Conan the Barbarian (2011 novel), a novelization of the 2011 film
- Conan the Barbarian (2011 collection), a collection of stories about the character published by Ballantine Books
- Conan (Dark Horse Comics), a comics series from Dark Horse Comics by Brian Wood
- Conan the Barbarian (dog), pet of Argentine president Javier Milei

== See also ==
- Conan (disambiguation)
- Conan the Adventurer (disambiguation)
- Conan the Cimmerian (disambiguation)
- Conan the Conqueror (disambiguation)
- Conan the Destroyer (disambiguation)
- Barbarian (disambiguation)
