= The Destroyer (painting) =

1971 painting by Frank Frazetta

- The Destroyer.
- Artist: Frank Frazetta
- Year: 1971
- Medium: Oil on canvas

The Destroyer (also known as Conan the Destroyer) is a 1971 painting by American artist Frank Frazetta. Notwithstanding the prolific use of the word "Conan" that's been attached to Frazetta's work for many years, none of his paintings bear the "Conan" name. The painting depicts Conan the Barbarian in the act of swinging an axe with dead warriors around him.

== Sale ==
On July 23, 2010, Conan the Destroyer sold for US$1.5 million. It was bought by a private collector, fetching the highest price paid of any of Frazetta's paintings. It was sold two months after Frazetta died in May.
