= Conan the Adventurer =

Conan the Adventurer may refer to:

- Conan the Barbarian, the fictional barbarian from stories by Robert E. Howard
- Conan the Adventurer (short story collection), a 1966 collection of four fantasy short stories by Robert E. Howard and L. Sprague de Camp
- Conan the Adventurer (1992 TV series), a 1990s animated series
- Conan the Adventurer (1997 TV series), a live-action television series starring Ralf Möller
- Conan the Adventurer (comics), a 1994 comic book series

== See also ==
- Conan (disambiguation)
- Conan the Barbarian (disambiguation)
- Conan the Cimmerian (disambiguation)
- Conan of Cimmeria (disambiguation)
- Conan the Conqueror (disambiguation)
- Conan the Destroyer (disambiguation)
- Adventurer (disambiguation)
