= Conand =

Conand may refer to:

- Conand (mythology), a leader of the Fomorians, in Irish mythology
- Conand, Ain, a commune in France
