= Cimmeria =

Cimmeria may refer to:

- Cimmeria, an ancient name of Crimea, a peninsula in the northern part of the Black Sea
  - Bosporan Kingdom, a polity of antiquity located on Crimea, also referred to as Cimmeria
- Cimmerians, an ancient people who lived in the North Caucasus in the 8th and 7th century BC, usually associated with the ancient Cimmeria or Crimea
- Cimmeria (continent), an ancient microcontinent separating the ancient Paleo-Tethys and Neo-Tethys oceans
- Cimmeria (Conan), a fictional country created by Robert E. Howard for his Conan the Barbarian stories
- Cimmeria (poem), by Robert E. Howard
- Cimmeria, a fictional country in If on a winter's night a traveler by Italo Calvino
- Cimmeria (Stargate), a fictional planet in the Stargate setting

== See also ==
- Crimea (disambiguation)
- Kimmerikon, an ancient Greek town southwest of modern Kerch
- Terra Cimmeria, a region on Mars
