= Maciej Kononowicz =

Polish footballer

Personal information
- Full name: Maciej Kononowicz
- Date of birth: 18 March 1988 (age 38)
- Place of birth: Świebodzin, Poland
- Height: 1.79 m (5 ft 10 in)
- Position: Forward

Team information
- Current team: Przylep Zielona Góra
- Number: 10

Youth career
- Sprotavia Szprotawa
- UKP Zielona Góra
- 2004–2006: Amica Wronki

Senior career*
Years	Team	Apps	(Gls)
2005–2006	Amica Wronki II		
2006–2007	Amica Wronki	0	(0)
2007–2009	Lech Poznań	2	(0)
2010	Chrobry Głogów	9	(0)
2010–2011	Czarni Żagań	32	(5)
2011–2012	Polonia Środa Wielkopolska	26	(7)
2013	Unia Swarzędz	13	(6)
2013	UKP Zielona Góra	6	(1)
2014	Sandecja Nowy Sącz	5	(0)
2015	Formacja Port 2000	8	(0)
2015–2018	Sprotavia Szprotawa		
2018	TS Przylep	13	(1)
2018–2019	Orzeł Międzyrzecz	22	(3)
2021	Dozamet Nowa Sól	2	(0)
2022	Promień Żary	13	(0)
2022–	Przylep Zielona Góra	52	(65)
- * Club domestic league appearances and goals as of 20:52, 24 June 2025 (UTC)

Maciej Kononowicz (born 18 March 1988) is a Polish footballer who plays as a forward for Przylep Zielona Góra.

== Honours ==
Lech Poznań

- Polish Cup: 2008–09

Formacja Port 2000 Mostki

- III liga Lower Silesia-Lubusz: 2014–15

Przylep Zielona Góra

- Klasa A Zielona Góra I: 2024–25
- Klasa B Zielona Góra: 2023–24
- Polish Cup (Zielona Góra County regionals): 2024–25
