= Conan the Conqueror (disambiguation) =

Conan the Conqueror may refer to:

- Conan the Barbarian, the fictional character created by Robert E. Howard, also known as "Conan the Conqueror"
- Conan the Conqueror (1987 film), cancelled sequel to the 1984 film "Conan the Destroyer"
- Conan the Conqueror (2017 film), cancelled sequel to the 1982 film "Conan the Barbarian"
- The Hour of the Dragon (1950 novel), novel by Robert E. Howard, also published as "Conan the Conqueror"
- King Conan: The Conqueror (2014 comics), comic book series, see Conan (Dark Horse Comics)

== See also ==
- Kull the Conqueror (1997 film), film derived from the script of the cancelled 1987 film "Conan the Conqueror"
- The Conquering Sword of Conan (2005 anthology), story collection of Robert E. Howard's Conan works
- Conan the Unconquered (1983 novel), novel by Robert Jordan
- Conan the Destroyer (disambiguation)
- Conan the Barbarian (disambiguation)
- Conan the Cimmerian (disambiguation)
- Conan the Adventurer (disambiguation)
- Conan (disambiguation)
- Conqueror (disambiguation)
