= Vladimir Kononenko =

Russian footballer

Personal information
- Full name: Vladimir Anatolyevich Kononenko
- Date of birth: 12 October 1971 (age 55)
- Positions: Defender; midfielder

Senior career*
Years	Team	Apps	(Gls)
1989–1990	FC Tsement Novorossiysk	3	(0)
1990–1991	FC Amur Blagoveshchensk	31	(0)
1992	FC Niva Slavyansk-na-Kubani	35	(0)
1992	FC Kuban Krasnodar	1	(0)
1993	FC Spartak Anapa	9	(0)
1995–1996	FC Vityaz Krymsk (amateur)		
- * Club domestic league appearances and goals

Vladimir Anatolyevich Kononenko (Russian: Владимир Анатольевич Кононенко; born 12 October 1971) is a former Russian football player.
