= The Constitution of the United States of America: Analysis and Interpretation =

Comprehensive annotation of the Constitution of the United States of America

The Constitution of the United States of America: Analysis and Interpretation (popularly known as the Constitution Annotated or CONAN) is a publication encompassing the United States Constitution with analysis and interpretation by the Congressional Research Service along with in-text annotations of cases decided by the Supreme Court of the United States. The centennial edition of the Constitution Annotated was published in 2013 by the 112th Congress, containing more than 2,300 pages and referencing almost 6,000 cases.

== History ==
The need for a comprehensive guide to the interpretation of the Constitution was apparent to Congress from early in the 20th century. In 1911, the Senate Manual contained the United States Constitution and Amendments with citations to decisions by the U.S. Supreme Court concerning constitutional law. The first edition of the Constitution Annotated was published by the 63rd Congress as Senate Document 12, in 1913. Ten years later in 1923, another edition was published, Senate Document 96 of the 67th Congress, followed in turn by Senate Document 154 of the 68th Congress.

The Constitution Annotated has been published as a bound edition every 10 years, with biannual updates in the intervening years that cover new constitutional case law. In 2013, to coincide with the centennial edition, new resources were introduced, including a frequently revised "digital update" version hosted by the GPO's Federal Digital System (FDsys) and a mobile app for iOS devices, with an Android version under development.

== See also ==
- Commentaries on the Constitution of the United States
