= Tom Connan =

British singer, actor, author (born 1995)

Tom Connan (born September 3, 1995, in London) is a singer, actor and author. His music videos and novels were mentioned by several media, including L'Obs, Mediapart, Public Sénat and Radio France Internationale.

== Biography ==
Born in 1995, he began doing music independently while studying at HEC Paris and released his debut EP in 2017. His musical work was mentioned by several media, in France and in English-speaking countries.

In 2017, he published the satire book 'Le Camp' under the pseudonym of Nathan Comons, based on his student experience at HEC Paris. His novel was widely reported by French media, including L'Obs, Le Bondy blog, Mediapart, France Culture, Radio France Internationale and Sud Radio. He debated with Jean-Michel Blanquer, Minister of National Education and former director of ESSEC Business School on Public Sénat about his book and higher education, especially business schools.

In October 2018, he published 'En Marge !', his second novel.

During the Me Too movement, he said in L'Obs that he had been the victim of sexual harassment and claimed that boys -i.e. not only girls- were also affected by this major problem.

== Works ==
=== Novels ===
- Le Camp, Connan Books, 2017, ISBN 978-2955735510.
- En Marge !, Connan Books, 2018, ISBN 978-2955735527.
- Radical, Albin Michel, 2020, ISBN 978-2-226-44788-3.
- Pollution, Albin Michel, 2022, ISBN 978-2-226-46483-5.
- Capital rose, Albin Michel, 2024, ISBN 978-2226480989.

=== Non-Fiction ===
- Manuel de résurrection, with Collectif Sigma, Connan Books, 2019, ISBN 978-2955735534.

== Awards ==
Nomination for the Sade Prize 2024
