= MS Stena Adventurer =

MS Stena Adventurer may refer to the following ships operated by Stena Line:

- MS Stena Adventurer (1996), a ferry built in 1977 for Sealink UK as MS St. Columba. No longer a part of the Stena Line Fleet.
- MS Stena Adventurer (2003), a ferry currently operated by Stena Line between Holyhead and Dublin.
