= Robert E. Howard bibliography (poems A–H) =

Bibliography

A list of poems by Robert E. Howard (1906–1936), an American writer and poet in early 20th century Texas. His love of poetry came from being read to by his mother at a young age. However, his attempts to make a living by poetry were unsuccessful and he is today most remembered for his short stories and fiction. Nevertheless, Howard wrote hundreds of poems; many were published within his lifetime and the others published after his 1936 suicide.

== Key ==
Title	Lines	Opening line	Place of publication	Publication date	Alternative title(s)	Source text	Notes	References
The title of the poem	#	The text of the first known line in the poem	The book or magazine in which the poem was first published	The date on which the poem was first published	Any alternative titles by which the poem is also known	Links to online texts where available	Further information about the poem	Bibliographic sources
An alternative title for the poem					The main title of the poem			

The lack of information in a column does not necessarily mean that the information does not exist, only that verifiable information is not currently available. For example, the lack of publication information does not necessarily mean that a poem has not been published to date, nor does the lack of a definite note about the public domain indicate that a poem is still under copyright.

This table may be sorted by different columns by clicking on the icon in the appropriate column. Clicking the icon again will alternate between ascending and descending order.

Additional notes

Title/Alternative title: Some poems are known by multiple titles. Alternative titles are shown in the column of the same name. Every effort has been made to list full information at all entries for each title, to save the user time in scrolling. Occasionally, alternative titles appear consecutively, in which case the second entry will follow without additional information, shown in a darker gray on the table. In other cases, some poems were not titled by Howard or the original title has not survived. Some poems have been given tentative titles after Howard's death; this is indicated in the Notes column. Where multiple titles exist, they have been listed alphabetically by their various designations following the word "Untitled." Some pieces of poetry were used by Howard as epigraphs within his stories. Lord (1976) listed these poems under the title of the short story rather than the title of the poem itself, so the poems are listed under those titles as well. With epigraphs, the first publication information given in this table is that of the poem's first printing separated from the story.

Lines: The number of lines in the poem.

Source text: Links given in the Source Text column are to copies of the poem in online libraries (where available). For ease of browsing the table, these links are preceded by a small icon. For example, for poems on Wikisource.

References: Bibliographic references are given in the final column of each row. The exception to this is the Notes column; as notes may come from diverse sources, or from a separate part of one of the main sources, each individual note is followed by its own reference.

== Poetry ==
Title	Lines	Opening line	Place of publication	Publication date	Alternative title(s)	Source text	Notes	References
Abe Lincoln	34	Your only excuse, Abe Lincoln	Shadows of Dreams	1989			Letter:^{K} Tevis Clyde Smith, c. May 1932 (Herman 2006, p. 147) The second of "Three Sketches"	Herman 2006, p. 147; Thom, Herman & Woods, § A
Ace High	16	Slim white fingers	A Rhyme of Salem Town and Other Poems	2002				Lord 1976, p. 300; Herman 2006, p. 147; Thom, Herman & Woods, § A
Across the wastes of No Man's Land ...	28	Across the wastes of No Man's Land, the grey-clad slayers came	A Rhyme of Salem Town and Other Poems	2002	Untitled: No Man's Land		Tentative title^{B} (Lord 1976, p. 308)	Lord 1976, p. 308; Herman 2006, p. 188
Actor, The	12	I am an actor and have been an actor from birth	A Rhyme of Salem Town and Other Poems	2002	Untitled (I am an actor ...")		Tentative title^{B} (Lord 1976, p. 300)	Lord 1976, p. 300; Herman 2006, p. 147; Thom, Herman & Woods, § A
Adam's loins were mountains	40	Adam's loins were mountains	The Collected Letters of Robert E. Howard, Volume 1: 1923-1929	Jun 2007	Untitled: Adam's loins were mountains	Wikisource	Letter:^{K} Tevis Clyde Smith, c. November 1928 (Herman 2006, p. 217); PD^{L}	Herman 2006, p. 217
Adventure (1) ^{N}	21	Adventure, I have followed your beck	Omniumgathum	1976	Untitled ("Adventure, I have followed your beck")		Tentative title^{B} (Lord 1976, p. 300); An early work^{C} (Lord 1976, p. 300)	Lord 1976, p. 300; Herman 2006, p. 147; Thom, Herman & Woods, § A
Adventure (2)^{N}	4	I am the spur	The Cross Plainsman	2004		Wikisource	Letter:^{K} Tevis Clyde Smith, June 23, 1926 (Herman 2006, p. 148); PD^{L}	Herman 2006, p. 148; Thom, Herman & Woods, § A
Adventurer	4	My feet are set on the outward trails	The Last of the Trunk Och Brev I Urval	Mar 2007		Wikisource	Letter:^{K} Tevis Clyde Smith, June 23, 1926 (Herman 2006, p. 148); PD^{L}	Herman 2006, p. 148; Thom, Herman & Woods, § A
Adventurer, The	44	Dusk on the sea; the fading twilight shifts	The Grim Land and Others	1976		Wikisource	PD^{L}	Lord 1976, p. 300; Herman 2006, p. 148; Thom, Herman & Woods, § A
Adventurer's Mistress, The (1)^{N}	64	The scarlet standards of the sun	The Ghost Ocean and Other Poems of the Supernatural	1982	Untitled ("The scarlet standards of the sun")		a draft version with a different 4th stanza is found in the notes of COLLECTED POETRY	Lord 1976, p. 300; Herman 2006, p. 148; Thom, Herman & Woods, § A
Adventurer's Mistress, The (2)	110	The fogs of night	Magira #38	Spring 1992	Dance with Death, The ^{N}		From an undated enclosure with a letter to Tevis Clyde Smith; German^{P} (Herman 2006, p. 160)	Lord 1976, p. 302; Herman 2006, p. 160
Adventures ^{N}	8	Scarlet and gold are the stars tonight	The Cross Plainsman	August 2004 (last four lines only) / The Collected Letters of Robert E. Howard, Volume 1: 1923-1929 (first full appearance)	Untitled: Scarlet and gold are the stars tonight	Wikisource	Letter:^{K} Tevis Clyde Smith, ca. November 1928 (Herman 2006, p. 148); PD^{L}	Herman 2006, p. 148; Thom, Herman & Woods, § A
Affair at the Tavern, The	61	Trailing dusk, and a coach-and-four	A Rhyme of Salem Town and Other Poems	2002				Lord 1976, p. 300; Herman 2006, p. 148; Thom, Herman & Woods, § A
After a Flaming Night	24	Kissing the lips of the morning	Weirdbook #9	1975	Mark of the Beast		This poem is at the start of Act II, Scene ii of "Songs of Bastards"; From a letter to Tevis Clyde Smith, ca. March 1929	Lord 1976, p. 300; Herman 2006, p. 148; Thom, Herman & Woods, § A
After the trumps are sounded	8	After the trumps are sounded	The Last of the Trunk Och Brev I Urval	Mar 2007	Untitled: After the trumps are sounded	Wikisource	Letter:^{K} Tevis Clyde Smith, c. September 1929 (Herman 2006, p. 218); PD^{L}	Herman 2006, p. 218
Against the blood red moon a tower stands	8 lines, plus a 142-word prose introduction	Against the blood red moon a tower stands	The Last of the Trunk Och Brev I Urval	Mar 2007	Untitled: Against the blood red moon a tower stands	Wikisource	Letter:^{K} Tevis Clyde Smith, c. Aug/Sep 1927 (Herman 2006, p. 218); PD^{L}	Herman 2006, p. 218
Age	20	Age sat on his high throne	The Junto^{H} / The Howard Collector	Sep 1928 / Spring 1971	To the Old Men (two slightly variant versions)		Conflict:^{M} Lord (1976, p. 169), The Howard Collector, 1971/Herman (2006, p. 148), The Junto, 1928	Lord 1976, p. 169; Herman 2006, p. 148; Thom, Herman & Woods, § A
Age Comes to Rabelais	12	Judas Iscariot, Saul and Cain	The Howard Collector	Summer 1966				Lord 1976, p. 169; Herman 2006, p. 148; Thom, Herman & Woods, § A
Ages Stride on Golden Feet, The	6	The ages stride on golden feet	A Rhyme of Salem Town and Other Poems	2002		Untitled ("The ages stride on golden feet")	Tentative title^{B} (Lord 1976, p. 300)	Lord 1976, p. 300; Herman 2006, p. 148; Thom, Herman & Woods, § A
Ah, I know black queens ...	34	Ah, I know black queens whose passions blaze	Risque Stories #1	Mar 1984	Strange Passion		Tentative title^{B} (Lord 1976, p. 311)	Lord 1976, p. 311; Herman 2006, p. 211
Ah, the rover hides	4	Oh, the rover hides in Aves when he runs	A Rhyme of Salem Town and Other Poems	2002		Untitled: O THE BRAVE SEA-ROVER	Tentative title^{B} (Lord 1976, p. 308); An early work^{C} (Lord 1976, p. 308)	Lord 1976, p. 308; Herman 2006, p. 189
Ah, those were glittering, jeweled days	12	Ah, those were glittering, jeweled days	Night Images	1976	Days of Glory		Tentative title^{B} (Lord 1976, p. 302)	Lord 1976, p. 302; Herman 2006, p. 161
Alamo, The	6	For days they ringed us with the flame	The Last of the Trunk Och Brev I Urval	Mar 2007		Wikisource	Letter:^{K} Tevis Clyde Smith, June 23, 1926 (Herman 2006, p. 148); PD^{L}	Herman 2006, p. 148; Thom, Herman & Woods, § A
Alien	16	My brothers are blond and calm of speech	Verses in Ebony	1975	Untitled ("My brothers are blond and calm of speech")		Tentative title^{B}	Lord 1976, p. 300; Herman 2006, pp. 148–149; Thom, Herman & Woods, § A
All Day			n/a	n/a			Lost^{U}	Thom, Herman & Woods, § A
All Hallows Eve	18	Now anthropoid and leprous shadows lope	Amazing Stories	Mar 1986	Untitled ("Now anthropoid and leprous shadows lope")		Tentative title^{B} (Lord 1976, p. 300)	Lord 1976, p. 300; Herman 2006, p. 149; Thom, Herman & Woods, § A
All is pose and artifice	4	All is pose and artifice	A Rhyme of Salem Town and Other Poems	2002	Artifice		Tentative title^{B} (Lord 1976, p. 300)	(Lord 1976, p. 300); Herman 2006, p. 150; Thom, Herman & Woods, § A
All men look at Life and all look differently	4	All men look at Life and all look differently	A Rhyme of Salem Town and Other Poems	2002	Perspective		Tentative title^{B} (Lord 1976, p. 308)	Lord 1976, p. 308; Herman 2006, p. 192
All the crowd	20	All the crowd	The Last of the Trunk Och Brev I Urval	Mar 2007	Untitled: ("All The Crowd")	Wikisource	Letter:^{K} Tevis Clyde Smith, October 9, 1925 (Herman 2006, p. 218); PD^{L}	Herman 2006, p. 218
Altars and Jesters	100	God is God and Mahommed his prophet	Altars and Jesters	1974	An Opium Dream; A Opium Dream			Lord 1976, p. 300; Herman 2006, p. 149; Thom, Herman & Woods, § A
Always Comes Evening	20	Riding down the road at evening with the stars for steed and shoon	The Phantagraph	Aug 1936		Wikisource	PD^{L}	Lord 1976, p. 170; Herman 2006, p. 149; Thom, Herman & Woods, § A
Ambition	9	Build me a gibbet against the sky	The Collected Letters of Robert E. Howard, Volume 2: 1930-1932	Oct 2007		Wikisource	Letter:^{K} Tevis Clyde Smith, c. April 1930 (Herman 2006, p. 149); PD^{L}	Herman 2006, p. 149; Thom, Herman & Woods, § A
American, An	36	Sing of my ancestors!	The Last of the Trunk Och Brev I Urval	Mar 2007		Wikisource	Letter:^{K} Tevis Clyde Smith, c. December 1928 (Herman 2006, p. 149); PD^{L}	Herman 2006, p. 149; Thom, Herman & Woods, § A
American Epic, An	8	The autumn sun was gettin' low, the day was mighty windy	The Collected Letters of Robert E. Howard, Volume 1: 1923-1929	Jun 2007		Wikisource	Letter:^{K} Tevis Clyde Smith, c. April 1929 (Herman 2006, p. 149); PD^{L}	Herman 2006, p. 149; Thom, Herman & Woods, § A
Am-ra stood on a mountain height	5	Am-ra stood on a mountain height	Kull: Exile of Atlantis	Oct 2006	Untitled: Summer Morn	Wikisource	Tentative title^{B} (Lord 1976, p. 311); PD^{L}	Lord 1976, p. 311; Herman 2006, p. 212
Am-ra the Ta-an	72	Out of the land of the morning sun	A Rhyme of Salem Town and Other Poems	2002			Unfinished (Lord 1976, p. 300); An early work^{C} (Lord 1976, p. 300)	Lord 1976, p. 300; Herman 2006, p. 149; Thom, Herman & Woods, § A
The Amsterdam Maid	(4 2-line verses with identical alternating refrains following each, plus a 2-line chorus after each verse)	("In Amsterdam I met a maid ...")	The Collected Letters of Robert E. Howard, Volume 1: 1923-1929	Jun 2007		https://www.youtube.com/watch?v=b2JO-i2aPs8; http://mudcat.org/thread.cfm?threadid=5070	Mnemonic reconstruction ^{V} Letter:^{K} Robert W. Gordon, March 17, 1927; NOT INCLUDED IN COLLECTED POETRY	
The ancient boast, the ancient song	12	The ancient boast, the ancient song	A Rhyme of Salem Town and Other Poems	2002	Untitled: The House of Gael		Tentative title^{B} (Lord 1976, p. 307)	Lord 1976, p. 307; Herman 2006, p. 174
Ancient English Balladel	34	O come, friend Dick, go whoring with me!	Lewd Tales	1987			Letter:^{K} Tevis Clyde Smith, c. February 1929 (Herman 2006, p. 150)	Herman 2006, p. 150; Thom, Herman & Woods, § A
And Beowulf Rides Again	24	Thunder white on a golden track	Spoor Anthology #1	1974				Lord 1976, p. 300; Herman 2006, p. 150; Thom, Herman & Woods, § A
And Bill, he looked at me and said ... (Title not Howard's)		And Bill, he looked at me and said ...	The Right Hook^{I} vol. 1, #2	1925	Untitled: And Bill, he looked at me and said ...			Herman 2006, p. 218
And Dempsey climbed into the ring and the crowd sneered (Title not Howard's)	6	And Dempsey climbed into the ring and the crowd sneered	The Collected Letters of Robert E. Howard, Volume 1: 1923-1929	Jun 2007	Untitled: And Dempsey climbed into the ring and the crowd sneered	Wikisource	Letter:^{K} Tevis Clyde Smith, July 16, 1925 (Herman 2006, p. 218); PD^{L}; introduced with the line "In Carl S.'s style" (presumably Sandberg)	Herman 2006, p. 218
And Man Was Given the Earth to Rule	44	The mallet clashes on the nail	Fantasy Book #21	September 1986	For Man Was Given the Earth to Rule; The Old Gods Brood		Listed as "And . . ." in Fantasy Book;"The Old Gods Brood" is from Glenn Lord's title to an untitled typescript.	Herman 2006, p. 150; Thom, Herman & Woods, § A
And so his boyhood wandered into youth	35	And so his boyhood wandered into youth	Weird Tales	Dec 1937	Fragment	Wikisource	In SELECTED POEMS the first line is used as the title; the poem is not an unfinished fragment, as many Howard works are designated, but was actually titled "Fragment" in its first publication	Lord 1976, p. 175; Herman 2006, p. 169; Howard & Burke (2008, p. x)
And So I Sang	10	They bade me sing, but all I could sing, in the glory and the shine	A Rhyme of Salem Town and Other Poems	2002				Lord 1976, p. 300; Herman 2006, p. 150; Thom, Herman & Woods, § A
And there were lethal women, flaming ice and fire	8	And there were lethal women, flaming ice and fire	Yesteryear #4	Oct 1989	Untitled: And there were lethal women, flaming ice and fire		Letter:^{K} Tevis Clyde Smith, c. February 1929 (Herman 2006, p. 219)	Herman 2006, pp. 218–219
Another Hymn of Hate	18	No heavens for me with their streets of gold and harps electroplated	A Rhyme of Salem Town and Other Poems	2002	Another Hymn of Hatred		Pen name: Patrick Howard^{O} (Lord 1976, p. 299)	Lord 1976, p. 299; Herman 2006, p. 150; Thom, Herman & Woods, § A
Apeneck Sweeney spreads his knees	7	Apeneck Sweeney spreads his knees	private	1930 (?)			According to Rusty Burke's "The Robert E. Howard Bookshelf" webpage, REH was acquainted with T. S. Eliot's "Sweeney Among the Nightingales," and gave a copy of an unnumbered copy (from a 1930 edition of 1200) of The Satyricon of Petronius Arbiter to his friend Clyde Smith with this inscription, citing the first stanza of the poem from memory, with the usual inevitable discrepancies. to his friend Clyde Smith with this rhymed inscription.	cited by Barbara Barrett in "Robert E. Howard and the Issue of Racism: The African and African-American Poems — Part 4" on the REH—Two-Gun Raconteur website, JA 12, 2012
Arcadian Days	95	Back in days of green Arcady when the world was young and free	The Last of the Trunk Och Brev I Urval	Mar 2007		Wikisource	Letter:^{K} Tevis Clyde Smith, August 6, 1926 (Herman 2006, p. 150); PD^{L}	Herman 2006, p. 150; Thom, Herman & Woods, § A
Arkham	4	Drowsy and dull with ages the houses blink	Weird Tales	Aug 1932			Letter:^{K} H. P. Lovecraft, December 9, 1931	(Lord 1976, p. 170); Herman 2006, p. 150; Thom, Herman & Woods, § A
Artifice	4	All is pose and artifice	A Rhyme of Salem Town and Other Poems	2002	Untitled ("All is pose and artifice")		Tentative title^{B} (Lord 1976, p. 300)	(Lord 1976, p. 300); Herman 2006, p. 150; Thom, Herman & Woods, § A
As a great spider grows to monstrous girth	14	As a great spider grows to monstrous girth	A Rhyme of Salem Town and Other Poems	2002	Ju-ju Doom		Tentative title^{B} (Lord 1976, p. 307)	Lord 1976, p. 307; Herman 2006, p. 176
As I Rode Down to Lincoln Town	4	As I rode down to Lincoln town beneath a copper moon	A Rhyme of Salem Town and Other Poems	2002	Rhyme of Salem Town, A		Tentative title^{B} (Lord 1976, p. 300)	Lord 1976, p. 300; Herman 2006, p. 150; Thom, Herman & Woods, § A
"As I went down to Salem town ..."	74	As I went down to Salem town, I met good Mistress Meek	A Rhyme of Salem Town and Other Poems	2002	Untitled ("As I went down to Salem town ...")		Tentative title^{B} (Lord 1976, p. 309)	Lord 1976, p. 309; Herman 2006, p. 197
As It Was In the Beginning			n/a	n/a			Lost^{U}	Thom, Herman & Woods, § A
As Sampson Was			n/a	n/a			Lost^{U}	Thom, Herman & Woods, § A
As you dance upon the air	7	As you dance upon the air	A Rhyme of Salem Town and Other Poems	2002	Untitled: As you dance upon the air		Incomplete, only the final seven lines survive (Lord 1976, p. 312)	Lord 1976, p. 312; Herman 2006, p. 219
Astarte's Idol Stands Alone	18	Astarte's idol stands alone	A Rhyme of Salem Town and Other Poems	2002				Lord 1976, p. 300; Herman 2006, p. 150; Thom, Herman & Woods, § A
At Least No Hypocrite			n/a	n/a			Lost^{U}	Thom, Herman & Woods, § A
At Ringside			n/a	n/a			Lost^{U}	Thom, Herman & Woods, § A
At the Bazaar	20	There breaks in the bazaar of Zanzibar	The Last of the Trunk Och Brev I Urval	Mar 2007		Wikisource	Letter:^{K} Tevis Clyde Smith, C. March 1929 (Herman 2006, p. 151); PD^{L}	Herman 2006, p. 151
At the Inn of the Gory Dagger, with nothing to...	56	At the Inn of the Gory Dagger, with nothing to...	The Last of the Trunk Och Brev I Urval	Mar 2007	Untitled: At the Inn of the Gory Dagger	Wikisource	Letter:^{K} Tevis Clyde Smith, c. February 1929 (Herman 2006, p. 219); PD^{L}	Herman 2006, pp. 218–219
At the Sign of the Silver Slipper			n/a	n/a			Lost^{U}	Thom, Herman & Woods, § A
Attila Rides No More	18	Across the silent sands we sprang	Singers in the Shadows	1970				Lord 1976, p. 170; Herman 2006, p. 151; Thom, Herman & Woods, § A
Authorial Version of Duna	16	When I was a little lad	Robert E. Howard: Selected Letters: 1931-1936	1991			Letter:^{K} Tevis Clyde Smith, C. May 1932 (Herman 2006, p. 151); "Duna" was a then-popular poem by Marjorie Pickthall (1883–1922) about an old sailor happy to come back home to Duna	Herman 2006, p. 151; Thom, Herman & Woods, § A
Autumn	12	Now is the lyre of Homer flecked with rust	Weird Tales	April 1933	A Dream of Autumn; The Autumn of the World		Letter:^{K} Tevis Clyde Smith, C. March 1930 (Herman 2006, p. 151); Originally titled "The Autumn of the World"	Lord 1976, p. 170; Herman 2006, p. 151; Thom, Herman & Woods, § A
Autumn of the World, The	12	Now is the lyre of Homer flecked with rust	Weird Tales	April 1933	Autumn; The Dream of Autumn		Letter:^{K} Tevis Clyde Smith, C. March 1930 (Herman 2006, p. 151); Originally titled "The Autumn of the World"	Herman 2006, p. 151; Thom, Herman & Woods, § A
"Aw Come On and Fight!"	24	His first was a left that broke my nose	The Collected Letters of Robert E. Howard, Volume 2: 1930-1932	Oct 2007		Wikisource	Letter:^{K} Tevis Clyde Smith, c. March 1930 (Herman 2006, p. 151); PD^{L}	Herman 2006, p. 151; Thom, Herman & Woods, § A
"Away in the dusky barracoon"	88	Away in the dusty barracoon	A Rhyme of Salem Town and Other Poems	2002	Cornish Jack; Untitled ("Away in the dusky barracoon")		Tentative title^{B} (Lord 1976, p. 302)	Lord 1976, p. 302; Herman 2006, p. 159; Thom, Herman & Woods, § C
Baal	57	My name is Baal; I walked the earth of yore	A Rhyme of Salem Town and Other Poems	2002	Untitled ("My name is Baal ...")		Tentative title^{B} (Lord 1976, p. 301)	Lord 1976, p. 301; Herman 2006, p. 151; Thom, Herman & Woods, § B
Baal-pteor	6	High on his throne Baal-pteor sat	A Rhyme of Salem Town and Other Poems	2002	Untitled ("High on his throne Baal-Pteor sat")		Tentative title^{B} (Lord 1976, p. 301)	Lord 1976, p. 301; Herman 2006, p. 151; Thom, Herman & Woods, § B
Babel	19	Now in the gloom the pulsing drums repeat	The Fantasy Fan	Jan 1935		Wikisource	Letter:^{K} Tevis Clyde Smith, undated (Herman 2006, p. 152); PD^{L}	Lord 1976, p. 170; Herman 2006, pp. 151–152; Thom, Herman & Woods, § B
Babylon—draft	10	For I have watched the lizards crawl through high Belshazzer's marble hall ..."						
Babylon	16	For I have seen the lizards crawl	Always Comes Evening	1957	Untitled ("For I have seen the lizards crawl")		Originally untitled (Lord 1976, p. 171)	Lord 1976, p. 171; Herman 2006, p. 152; Thom, Herman & Woods, § B
Babylon has fallen	14	Babylon has fallen, has fallen, has fallen	Up John Kane! and Other Poems	1977	Dreams			Lord 1976, p. 303; Herman 2006, p. 163
Ballad of Abe Slickemmore, The	4	Guzzle your beer, you lazy louse!	The Cross Plainsman	Aug 2004		Wikisource	Letter:^{K} Tevis Clyde Smith, c. November 1928 (Herman 2006, p. 152); PD^{L}	Herman 2006, p. 152; Thom, Herman & Woods, § B
Ballad of Baibars, The	15	Iron winds and ruin and flame	Echoes From An Iron Harp^{A}	1972^{A}	The Sowers of the Thunder (in truncated version); Untitled: "Fill up my goblet"		Epigraph:^{S} The Sowers of the Thunder (Lord 1976, p. 206)	Lord 1976, p. 206; Herman 2006, pp. 152, 211; Thom, Herman & Woods, § B
Ballad of Beer, A	28	I was once, I declare, a grog-shop man	Shadows of Dreams	1989	Untitled ("I was once, I declare, a grog-shop man")		Letter:^{K} Tevis Clyde Smith, c. July 1930 (Herman 2006, p. 152); Originally untitled (Herman 2006, p. 152)	Herman 2006, p. 152; Thom, Herman & Woods, § B
Ballad of Buckshot Roberts, The	56	Buckshot Roberts was a Texas man	Rhymes of Death	1975	The Ballad of Bucksnort Roberts		Incorrectly titled "Ballad of Bucksnort Roberts" in its first appearance; Buckshot Roberts was a historical figure, involved in the Lincoln County War, famous for holing up in a cabin and shooting it out with an entire posse, getting killed, naturally Herman 2006, p. 152.	Lord 1976, p. 301; Herman 2006, p. 152; Thom, Herman & Woods, § B
Ballad of Bucksnort Roberts, The					The Ballad of Buckshot Roberts			Herman 2006, p. 152; Thom, Herman & Woods, § B
Ballad of Dark Agnes, The	4	Her sisters bend above their looms	n/a	n/a	Alternate title: verse heading for Chapter 4 of "Sword Woman"		Epigraph:^{S} Sword Woman (Lord 1976, p. 315) Never published separately from the story (Herman 2006, p. 152)	Lord 1976, p. 315; Herman 2006, p. 152; Thom, Herman & Woods, § B
Ballad of Insanity, A	8	Adam was my ball-and-chain	The Collected Letters of Robert E. Howard, Volume 1: 1923-1929	Jun 2007		Wikisource	Letter:^{K} Tevis Clyde Smith, c. November 1928 (Herman 2006, p. 152); PD^{L}	Herman 2006, p. 152; Thom, Herman & Woods, § B
Ballad of King Geraint, The	1,046	This is the tale of a nameless fight	The Ballad of King Geraint	1989	Untitled ("This is the tale of a nameless fight")		Tentative title^{B} (Lord 1976, p. 301); Title provided by Lenore Preece (Herman 2006, p. 153); Letter:^{K} Harold Preece, January 4, 1930 (Herman 2006, p. 153)	Lord 1976, p. 301; Herman 2006, p. 153; Thom, Herman & Woods, § B
Ballad of Monk Kickawhore, The	84	My brother, he was a keg of beer	The Collected Letters of Robert E. Howard, Volume 1: 1923-1929	Jun 2007		Wikisource	Letter:^{K} Tevis Clyde Smith, c. November 1928 (Herman 2006, p. 153); PD^{L}	Herman 2006, p. 153; Thom, Herman & Woods, § B
Ballad of Naughty Nell, The	26	There are deeds done in the East, my son, where women are bold and bad			The Ballad of Singapore Nell			Lord 1976, p. 301; Herman 2006, p. 153; Thom, Herman & Woods, § B
Ballad of Nell of Singapore, The		There are dark deeds done in the East, my son			The Ballad of Singapore Nell			Lord 1976, p. 301; Herman 2006, p. 153; Thom, Herman & Woods, § B
Ballad of Singapore Nell, The	26	There are grim things did, in the East, old kid	Chacal #1	Winter 1976	The Ballad of Naughty Nell and The Ballad of Singapore Nell		draft from an undated letter^{K} to Tevis Clyde Smith, significantly different from the version published in CHACAL and DESIRE; the original typescript version is used for COLLECTED POETRY	Lord 1976, p. 301; Herman 2006, p. 153; Thom, Herman & Woods, § B
Ballade	20	Shattered shards of a broken shrine	Shadows of Dreams	1989			Letter:^{K} Tevis Clyde Smith, undated (Herman 2006, p. 153)	Herman 2006, p. 153; Thom, Herman & Woods, § B
Bandit, The	31	Out of the Texas desert, over the Rio Grande	A Rhyme of Salem Town and Other Poems	2002	Untitled ("Out of the Texas desert ...")		Tentative title^{B} (Lord 1976, p. 301); An early work^{C} (Lord 1976, p. 301)	Lord 1976, p. 301; Herman 2006, p. 153; Thom, Herman & Woods, § B
Bar By the Side of the Road, The	24	There are liquorless souls that follow paths	The Howard Collector #17	Autumn 1972				Lord 1976, p. 171; Herman 2006, p. 153; Thom, Herman & Woods, § B
Baron and the Wench, The	20	The baron quaffed a draught of wine	A Rhyme of Salem Town and Other Poems	2002	Baron and the Wench, The; Untitled ("The baron quaffed a draught of wine ...")		Tentative title^{B} (Lord 1976, p. 301); Unfinished (Lord 1976, p. 301)/(Herman 2006, p. 153)	Lord 1976, p. 301; Herman 2006, p. 153; Thom, Herman & Woods, § B
The Baron of Fenland ...	19	The Baron of Fenland sat at ease ...	American and European Manuscripts and Printed Books	19 December 1986	Untitled: The Baron of Fenland ...		Letter:^{K} Tevis Clyde Smith, c. September 1927 (Herman 2006, p. 219); Also written on the endpapers of a copy of Beau Geste (Herman 2006, p. 219)	Herman 2006, p. 219
"The baron quaffed a draught of wine ..."	20	The baron quaffed a draught of wine	A Rhyme of Salem Town and Other Poems	2002	Baron and the Wench, The; Untitled ("The baron quaffed a draught of wine ...")		Tentative title^{B} (Lord 1976, p. 301); Unfinished (Lord 1976, p. 301)/(Herman 2006, p. 153)	Lord 1976, p. 301; Herman 2006, p. 153; Thom, Herman & Woods, § B
Bast			n/a	n/a			Lost^{U}	Thom, Herman & Woods, § B
Batter the Bars			n/a	n/a			Lost^{U}	Thom, Herman & Woods, § B
A beggar, singing without	14	A beggar, singing without	The Last of the Trunk Och Brev I Urval	Mar 2007	Untitled: A beggar, singing without		Excerpted from the verse play "Songs of Bastards" Letter:^{K} Tevis Clyde Smith, c. March 1929 (Herman 2006, p. 219)	Herman 2006, p. 219
Bell of Morni, The	24	There's a bell that hangs in a hidden cave	Bran Mak Morn — The Last King	2001	Untitled ("There's a bell that hangs in a hidden cave")		Tentative title^{B} (Lord 1976, p. 301)	Lord 1976, p. 301; Herman 2006, p. 153; Thom, Herman & Woods, § B
The Belle of Edinburgh Town	56	("Come all you pretty maidens ...")	The Collected Letters of Robert E. Howard, Volume 1: 1923-1929	Jun 2007		https://www.youtube.com/results?search_query=caroline+of+edinburgh	Mnemonic reconstruction^{V} of "Caroline of Edinburgh Town"; Letter:^{K} Robert W. Gordon, April 9, 1926; NOT INCLUDED IN COLLECTED POETRY	
Belshazzar	6	Slow through the streets of Babylon he went	The Howard Collector	Summer 1964	Belshazzer		Letter:^{K} Harold Preece, c. Oct/Nov 1930 (Herman 2006, p. 154)	Lord 1976, p. 171; Herman 2006, p. 154; Thom, Herman & Woods, § B
Belshazzer					Belshazzar		Title used in original letter to Harold Preece (Herman 2006, p. 154)	Herman 2006, p. 154; Thom, Herman & Woods, § B
Belshazzar's Dream			n/a	n/a			Lost^{U}	Thom, Herman & Woods, § B
Beneath The South Sea Moon			n/a	n/a			Lost^{U}	Thom, Herman & Woods, § B
Benny Leonard			n/a	n/a			Lost^{U}	Thom, Herman & Woods, § B
Bill Boozy was a pirate bold	8	Bill Boozy was a pirate bold	The Last of the Trunk Och Brev I Urval	Mar 2007	Untitled: Bill Boozy was a pirate bold	Wikisource	Letter:^{K} Tevis Clyde Smith, c. July 30, 1923 (Herman 2006, p. 217); PD^{L}	Herman 2006, p. 219
Black Chant Imperial	24	Trumpets triumph in red disaster	Weird Tales	Sep 1930			Shares lines with Empire (lines 1-4, 9-12- 21-32 & 37-40) (Lord 1976, p. 171)/(Herman 2006, p. 154)	Lord 1976, p. 171; Herman 2006, p. 154; Thom, Herman & Woods, § B
Black Dawn	105	A black moon nailed against a sullen dawn / The gods have said: "Life is a mystic shrine." / Mohammed, Buddha, Moses, Satan, Thor! / They sell brown men for gold in Zanzibar / Break down the world and mold it once again!	Black Dawn	1972			Letter:^{K} Tevis Clyde Smith, c. March 1929 (Herman 2006, p. 154); A cycle of 5 numbered, untitled poems: "Shadows" (20 lines), "Clouds" (13 lines), "Shrines" (26 lines), "The Iron Harp" (32 lines), and "Invocation (14 lines)"Cyle of five poems (Herman 2006, p. 154)	Lord 1976, p. 171; Herman 2006, p. 154; Thom, Herman & Woods, § B
Black Harps in the Hills	24	Thomas Fitzgerald, Shane O'Neill			Untitled: ("Thomas Fitzgerald, Shane O'Neill")		A shorter version of the 53-line "Black Harps in the Hills"; Letter:^{K} Harold Preece, c. March 1929, a version (Herman 2006, p. 154)	Lord 1976, p. 299; Herman 2006, p. 154; Thom, Herman & Woods, § B
Black Harps in the Hills	53	Let Saxons sing of Saxon kings	Omniumgathum	1976	Untitled ("Thomas Fitzgerald, Shane O'Neill")		Pen name: Patrick Mac Conaire Howard^{O} (Lord 1976, p. 299); Letter:^{K} Harold Preece, c. March 1929, a version (Herman 2006, p. 154)	Lord 1976, p. 299; Herman 2006, p. 154; Thom, Herman & Woods, § B
Black Mass		Long glaives of frozen light crawled up and down	Startling Mystery Stories	Fall 1967	A Vision		Nearly identical to "A Vision" in the first two stanzas, but changes a good bit in the last two	Lord 1976, p. 171; Herman 2006, p. 154; Thom, Herman & Woods, § B
Black Michael's Story	22	The moon above the Kerry hills	Always Comes Evening	1957	Retribution; The Song of Murtagh O'Brien; Untitled ("The moon above the Kerry hills ...")		Titled Retribution from an untitled draft, Howard's original title The Song of Murtagh O'Brien was found on a later copy (Herman 2006, p. 196)	Lord 1976, p. 183; Herman 2006, p. 196
Black Seas	8	I have heard black seas booming in the night	Fantasy Book #23 (vol 5, no. 5)	Mar 1987			Letter:^{K} Tevis Clyde Smith, c. June 1929 (Herman 2006, p. 155)	Herman 2006, p. 155; Thom, Herman & Woods, § B
Black Stone, The (verse heading)	4	They say foul things of Old Times still lurk	Inside & Science Fiction Advertiser ^{A}	Sep 1956^{A}			Epigraph:^{S} The Black Stone (Lord 1976, p. 203); Justin Geoffrey^{R} (Lord 1976, p. 203)	Lord 1976, p. 203; Herman 2006, p. 155; Thom, Herman & Woods, § B
Blood of Belshazzar, The (verse heading)	10	It shone on the breast of the Persian king.	Echoes From An Iron Harp^{A}	1972^{A}	The Song of the Red Stone		Epigraph:^{S} The Blood of Belshazzar (Lord 1976, p. 203); Verse heading of short story "The Blood of Belshazzar," starring Cormac Fitzgeoffrey	Herman 2006, p. 155; Thom, Herman & Woods, § B
Bloodstones and Ebony	(579 words)	I knelt in a great cavern before an altar which sent up in everlasting spirals a slender serpent of white smoke.	Etchings in Ivory (Chapbook)	1968			Fifth "prose poem" in the Etchings in Ivory cycle	
Blossoms & Pagodas			n/a	n/a			Lost^{U}	Thom, Herman & Woods, § B
Blow, Boys, Blow	12	Blow, my bullies, I long to hear you	The Collected Letters of Robert E. Howard, Volume 1: 1923-1929	Jun 2007		https://www.youtube.com/watch?v=vv0T7YPelEQ	Mnemonic reconstruction^{V} Letter:^{K} Robert W. Gordon, misdated January 2, 1926—actually 1927; NOT INCLUDED IN COLLECTED POETRY	
Blow the Man Down	16	As I was walking down Paradise Street	The Collected Letters of Robert E. Howard, Volume 1: 1923-1929	Jun 2007		https://www.youtube.com/watch?v=W5k0ZA4jxqw	Mnemonic reconstruction^{V} Letter:^{K} Robert W. Gordon, March 17, 1927; NOT INCLUDED IN COLLECTED POETRY	
Bob Fitzsimmons			n/a	n/a			Lost^{U}	Thom, Herman & Woods, § B
Bombing of Gon Fanfew, The	52	A gang of the Reds were hanging a Jew	The Last of the Trunk Och Brev I Urval	Mar 2007		Wikisource	Letter:^{K} Tevis Clyde Smith, February 25, 1925 (Herman 2006, p. 155); PD^{L}	Herman 2006, p. 155; Thom, Herman & Woods, § B
Boot Hill Payoff (aka "The Last Ride")								Contains an embedded mnemonic reconstruction of "Brady" (q.v.). The story is a collaboration with Chandler Whipple (Robert Enders Allen), who wrote chapters 1-6, then turned it over to Howard to finish.
Botany Bay	12 lines with a three-line chorus repeated after each verse	Blow, my bullies, I long to hear you	The Collected Letters of Robert E. Howard, Volume 1: 1923-1929	Jun 2007		https://www.youtube.com/watch?v=CKgXldJb5p4	Mnemonic reconstruction^{V} Letter:^{K} Robert W. Gordon, misdated January 2, 1926—actually 1927; NOT INCLUDED IN COLLECTED POETRY	
Brady	20	Early in the morning in the month of May	The Collected Letters of Robert E. Howard, Volume 1: 1923-1929	Jun 2007	"Boot Hill Payoff"; "The Last Ride"	https://www.youtube.com/watch?v=13RqdBIPKOU	Mnemonic reconstruction^{V} of "Duncan and Brady" also embedded in the short story "Boot Hill Payoff" (aka "The Last Ride") a collaboration with Chandler Whipple (Robert Enders Allen), who wrote chapters 1-6, then turned it over to Howard to finish; Letter:^{K} Robert W. Gordon, April 9, 1926; NOT INCLUDED IN COLLECTED POETRY	
Bran Mak Morn			n/a	n/a			Lost^{U}	Thom, Herman & Woods, § B
Brazen thewed giant of a grimmer Age		Brazen thewed giant of a grimmer Age	The Robert E. Howard Foundation Newsletter, vol. 1, #2	Nov 2007	Untitled: Brazen thewed giant of a grimmer Age		Unfinished (Herman 2006, p. 220)	Herman 2006, p. 220
Bride of Cuchulain, The	27	Love, we have laughed at living	Singers in the Shadows	1970				Lord 1976, p. 171; Herman 2006, p. 155; Thom, Herman & Woods, § B
Broken Walls of Babel, The	10	The broken walls of Babel rear	A Rhyme of Salem Town and Other Poems	2002	Untitled ("The broken walls of Babel")		Tentative title^{B} (Lord 1976, p. 301)	Lord 1976, p. 301; Herman 2006, p. 155; Thom, Herman & Woods, § B
Bubastes	14	Bubastes! Down the lank and sullen years	Whispers #2	Dec 1973	Egypt		Tentative title^{B} (Lord 1976, p. 301)	Lord 1976, p. 301
Buccaneer Speaks, A	24	I've broken the laws of man and God	Night Images	1976				Lord 1976, p. 301; Herman 2006, p. 155; Thom, Herman & Woods, § B
Buccaneer Treasure	126	This is a story that I heard from the lips of a drunken tramp	Amazing Science Fiction Stories	Jan 1985				Lord 1976, p. 301; Herman 2006, p. 155; Thom, Herman & Woods, § B
Builders, The (1)^{N}	12	We reared up Babel's towers	A Rhyme of Salem Town and Other Poems	2002			(Herman 2006, p. 156) Tentative title^{B} (Lord 1976, p. 301); Similar to version (2) (Herman 2006, p. 156); A total of six quatrains that were split over two pages of typescript that got separated; only two quatrains appeared in the original publication of A RHYME OF SALEM TOWN, then three in the Robert E. Howard Foundation's edition, then the last four quatrains were first published in THE REHF NEWSLETTER V1, #2; first complete publication in COLLECTED POETRY.	Lord 1976, p. 301; Herman 2006, p. 155; Thom, Herman & Woods, § B
Builders, The (2)^{N}	8	We reared up Bab-ilu's towers	The Collected Letters of Robert E. Howard, Volume 1: 1923-1929	Jun 2007			Letter:^{K} Tevis Clyde Smith, c. October 1927 (Herman 2006, p. 156); Similar to version (1) (Herman 2006, p. 156); shorter, slightly different, likely an early draft; uses the first and last quatrains from "Builders (1)", with "Bab-ilu" instead of "Babel" in the first line; not included in COLLECTED POETRY (Herman 2006, p. 156)	Herman 2006, p. 156; Thom, Herman & Woods, § B
Builders, The (3)^{N}	16(?)	The towers stand recorders	The Robert E. Howard Foundation Newsletter, vol. 1, #2	Nov 2007				Herman 2006, p. 156
But the Hills Were Ancient Then	24	Now is a summer come out of the sea	Amra (vol. 2, no. 8)	Nov-December 1959	Untitled ("Now is a summer come out of the sea")	Wikisource	Originally untitled (Lord 1976, p. 171); Title created by George Scithers (Herman 2006, p. 156); PD^{L}	Lord 1976, p. 171; Herman 2006, p. 156; Thom, Herman & Woods, § B
By old Abie Goldstein's pawn shop	8	By old Abie Goldstein's pawn shop where the ghetto meets the quay ...	The Last of the Trunk Och Brev I Urval	Mar 2007	Untitled: By old Abie Goldstein's pawn shop	Wikisource	Letter:^{K} Tevis Clyde Smith, c. March 1929 (Herman 2006, p. 220); PD^{L}	Herman 2006, p. 220
Call of Pan, The	14	My heart is a silver drum tonight	Shadows of Dreams	1989	Untitled ("My heart is a silver drum tonight")		Letter:^{K} Tevis Clyde Smith, c. November 1928 (Herman 2006, p. 156)	Herman 2006, p. 156; Thom, Herman & Woods, § C
Call of the Sea, The	30	White spray is flashing	A Rhyme of Salem Town and Other Poems	2002			Tentative title^{B} (Lord 1976, p. 301); Lines 1-6 were first published in Dark Valley Destiny (1983) (Herman 2006, p. 156)	Lord 1976, p. 301; Herman 2006, p. 156; Thom, Herman & Woods, § C
Calling to Rome, A	8	There's a calling, and a calling, and a calling	A Rhyme of Salem Town and Other Poems	2002	Untitled ("There's a calling, and a calling, and a calling ...")		Tentative title^{B} (Lord 1976, p. 301)	Lord 1976, p. 301; Herman 2006, p. 156; Thom, Herman & Woods, § C
Campus at Midnight, The	8	Starlight gleams through the windows	Omniumgathum	1976			Letter:^{K} Edna Mann, October 30, 1926 (Herman 2006, p. 156)	Herman 2006, p. 156; Thom, Herman & Woods, § C
Candles			Candles	Late 1974/Early 1975			Ascribed to Howard by Michael Horvat (publisher) after discovery in a book, Glenn Lord questions whether this is really a Howard poem (Herman 2006, pp. 156, 397).	Herman 2006, p. 156; Thom, Herman & Woods, § C
Castaway			Shadows of Dreams	1989				Herman 2006, p. 156; Thom, Herman & Woods, § C
Cat of Anubis, The					The Cats of Anubis		";	Thom, Herman & Woods, § C
Cats of Anubis, The	21	The stars comes blinking in a dusty day	Whispers #1	Jul 1973	The Cat of Anubis		Herman|2006|p=157	Lord 1976, p. 171; Herman 2006, p. 157; Thom, Herman & Woods, § C
Cells of the Coliseum, The	20	Across the walls a shadow falls	A Rhyme of Salem Town and Other Poems	2002				Lord 1976, p. 302; Herman 2006, p. 157; Thom, Herman & Woods, § C
Challenge			n/a	n/a			Lost^{U}	Thom, Herman & Woods, § C
Challenge to Bast, A	18	Come not to me, Bubastes	Fantasy Book Volume 5 Number 3	Sep 1986			Letter:^{K} Tevis Clyde Smith, undated (Herman 2006, p. 157)	Herman 2006, p. 157; Thom, Herman & Woods, § C
Champ, The	20	The champion sneered, the crowds they jeered	Robert E. Howard Fight Magazine #2	Sep 1990	Untitled ("The champion sneered ...")		Tentative title^{B} (Lord 1976, p. 302)	Lord 1976, p. 302; Herman 2006, p. 157; Thom, Herman & Woods, § C
Chant Demoniac, The	18	I am Satan; I am weary	Weird Tales #295	Winter 1989-90			Letter:^{K} Tevis Clyde Smith, c. January 1928 (Herman 2006, p. 157)	Herman 2006, p. 157; Thom, Herman & Woods, § C
Chant of the White Beard	8	O'er lakes agleam the old gods dream	Always Comes Evening	1957	Untitled ("O'er lakes agleam ...")		From:^{T} Men of the Shadows (Lord 1976, p. 172); Originally untitled (Lord 1976, p. 172); From:^{T} Men of the Shadows (Herman 2006, p. 157)	Lord 1976, p. 172; Herman 2006, p. 157; Thom, Herman & Woods, § C
Chariots of Nineveh, The							Lost^{U}	Thom, Herman & Woods, § C
"The chariots were chanting ..."	14	The chariots were chanting	Shadows of Dreams	1989	Last Words He Heard, The; Untitled ("The chariots were chanting ...")		Letter:^{K} Tevis Clyde Smith, c. December 1928 (Herman 2006, p. 179)	Herman 2006, p. 179
"Chesterton twanged on his lyre"	5	Chesterton twanged on his lyre	A Rhyme of Salem Town and Other Poems	2002	Song of Bards, A; Untitled ("Chesterton twanged on his lyre")		Tentative title^{B} (Lord 1976, p. 311)	Lord 1976, p. 311; Herman 2006, p. 208
Chief of the Matabeles, The	84	The warm veldt spread beneath the tropic sun	A Rhyme of Salem Town and Other Poems	2002	Untitled ("The warm veldt spread ...")		Tentative title^{B} (Lord 1976, p. 302); Unfinished (Lord 1976, p. 302)/(Herman 2006, p. 157); An early work^{C} (Lord 1976, p. 302)	Lord 1976, p. 302; Herman 2006, p. 157; Thom, Herman & Woods, § C
Children of the Night, The	4	Tread not where stony deserts hold			The House in the Oaks		Third of the three verses from "The House In The Oaks" (with "An Open Window" and "Arkham"). Originally from an early draft of "The Children of the Night", in which it was attributed to fictitious poet Justin Geoffrey. Replaced in the final version with two lines from "The Gates of Damascus" by James Flecker, this poem was added by Derleth to his version of "The House in the Oaks"; titled with the first line in COLLECTED POETRY. Herman 2006, p. 157	Herman 2006, p. 157; Thom, Herman & Woods, § C
Chinese Gong, The	20	StrumaSTRUM, struma strum struma strum strum strum!	The Collected Letters of Robert E. Howard, Volume 1: 1923-1929	Jun 2007		Wikisource	Letter:^{K} Tevis Clyde Smith, c. March 1928 (Herman 2006, p. 157); PD^{L}; Howard appended "Accent the second STRUM to get the rhythm."	Herman 2006, p. 157; Thom, Herman & Woods, § C
A Chinese washer, Ching-Ling ...		Untitled: A Chinese washer, Ching-Ling ...	The Toreador	5 July 1925	Untitled: A Chinese Washer, Ching-Ling			Herman 2006, p. 220
Choir Girl, The	8	I have a saintly voice, the people say	The Last of the Trunk Och Brev I Urval	Mar 2007		Wikisource	Letter:^{K} Tevis Clyde Smith, c. March 1928 (Herman 2006, p. 158); PD^{L}	Herman 2006, p. 158; Thom, Herman & Woods, § C
The Chorus of the Chant	2	God of the gods, high, most high! See these rods! Hear our cry!	Yesteryear #4	Oct 1989			Letter:^{K} Tevis Clyde Smith, c. February 1929 (Herman 2006, p. 187); Second poem in the cycle "The Mysteries"	Herman 2006, p. 187
Cimmeria	32	I remember	The Howard Collector #7	Winter 1965		Wikisource	Letter:^{K} Emil Petaja, December 17, 1934 (Herman 2006, p. 158)	Lord 1976, p. 172; Herman 2006, p. 158; Thom, Herman & Woods, § C
"Cities brooding beneath the sea"	19	Cities brooding beneath the seas	The Howard Collector #6	Spring 1965	Who is Grandpa Theobold?; Untitled ("Cities brooding beneath the sea")		Originally untitled (Lord 1976, p. 191); Letter:^{K} Tevis Clyde Smith, c. November 1931 (Herman 2006, p. 240)	Lord 1976, p. 191; Herman 2006, p. 240
A clash of steel, a thud of hoofs	4	Untitled: A clash of steel, a thud of hoofs	The Last of the Trunk Och Brev I Urval	Mar 2007	Untitled: A clash of steel, a thud of hoofs	Wikisource	Letter:^{K} Tevis Clyde Smith, August 4, 1923 (Herman 2006, p. 220); PD^{L}	Herman 2006, p. 220
Clouds	13	The gods have said: "Life is a mystic shrine."	n/a	n/a			Part 2 of 5 in the Black Dawn cycle (Herman 2006, pp. 154, 158); Never published separately (Herman 2006, p. 158)	Herman 2006, p. 158; Thom, Herman & Woods, § C
Code	4	We're a jolly good bunch of bums	A Rhyme of Salem Town and Other Poems	2002	Untitled ("We're a jolly good bunch of bums")		Tentative title^{B} (Lord 1976, p. 302); An early work^{C} (Lord 1976, p. 302)	Lord 1976, p. 302; Herman 2006, p. 158; Thom, Herman & Woods, § C
"Come with me to the Land of Sunrise"	8	Come with me to the Land of Sunrise	A Rhyme of Salem Town and Other Poems	2002	Trail of Gold, The; Untitled ("Come with me to the Land of Sunrise")		Tentative title^{B} (Lord 1976, p. 312); An early work^{C} (Lord 1976, p. 312)	Lord 1976, p. 312; Herman 2006, p. 217
Coming of Bast, The	36	She came in the dim of the desert dawn	Lone Star Universe	1976	Untitled: "She came in the dim of the desert dawn ..."		Letter:^{K} Tevis Clyde Smith, undated, a version (Herman 2006, p. 158)	Lord 1976, p. 302; Herman 2006, p. 158; Thom, Herman & Woods, § C
Coming of Bast, The—draft	46	She came in the grey of the desert dawn	The Collected Letters Of Robert E. Howard, Volume 3: 1933–1936	2008	Untitled: "She came in the grey of the desert dawn ..."		Letter:^{K} Tevis Clyde Smith, undated, beginning "Ha, Ha! Your not going ..." (Herman 2006, p. 158)	Lord 1976, p. 302; Herman 2006, p. 158; Thom, Herman & Woods, § C
Conn's Saga	6	The war was like a dream; I cannot tell	Echoes From An Iron Harp^{A} n/a	1972^{A} n/a	The Grey God Passes		Epigraph:^{S} verse heading for Chapter 5 of The Grey God Passes (Lord 1976, p. 204); Conflict:^{M} Lord (1976, p. 204), Echoes from an Iron Harp, 1972/Herman (2006, p. 159), no separate publication	Lord 1976, p. 204; Herman 2006, p. 159; Thom, Herman & Woods, § C
Construction Man, The			n/a	n/a			Lost^{U}	Thom, Herman & Woods, § C
Contrast			n/a	n/a			Lost^{U}	Thom, Herman & Woods, § C
Cooling of Spike McRue, The	43	A couple of hams were having a mill	Writer of the Dark	1986			A parody of Robert W. Service (Lord 1976, p. 302)/(Herman 2006, p. 159)	Lord 1976, p. 302; Herman 2006, p. 159; Thom, Herman & Woods, § C
Corbet			n/a	n/a			Lost^{U}	Thom, Herman & Woods, § C
Cornish Jack	88	Away in the dusty barracoon	A Rhyme of Salem Town and Other Poems	2002	Untitled ("Away in the dusky barracoon")		Tentative title^{B} (Lord 1976, p. 302)	Lord 1976, p. 302; Herman 2006, p. 159; Thom, Herman & Woods, § C
Counterspells	4	The doine sidhe sang to our swords by night	Unaussprechlichen Kulten #1	Oct 1990	Untitled ("The doine sidhe sang to our swords ...")		Tentative title^{B} (Lord 1976, p. 302)	Lord 1976, p. 302; Herman 2006, p. 159; Thom, Herman & Woods, § C
Cowboy	4	Poets and novelists have sung of me	The Last of the Trunk Och Brev I Urval	Mar 2007			Letter:^{K} Tevis Clyde Smith, June 23, 1926 (Herman 2006, p. 159); PD^{L}	Herman 2006, p. 159; Thom, Herman & Woods, § C
Crete	16	The green waves wash above us	Weird Tales	Feb 1929		Wikisource	PD^{L}	Lord 1976, p. 172; Herman 2006, p. 159; Thom, Herman & Woods, § C
A cringing woman's lot is hard	44	A cringing woman's lot is hard	The Last of the Trunk Och Brev I Urval	Mar 2007	Untitled: A cringing woman's lot is hard	Wikisource	Letter:^{K} Tevis Clyde Smith, c. June 1928 (Herman 2006, p. 220); PD^{L}; shares some stanzas with ECSTASY ("There is a strangeness in my soul ...")	Herman 2006, p. 220
Crown for a King, A	39	A roar of battle thundered in the hills	Ariel #1	Autumn 1976			Part 5 of the Voices of the Night cycle (Herman 2006, p. 159)	Lord 1976, p. 302; Herman 2006, p. 159; Thom, Herman & Woods, § C
Crusade	32	Wild flying hoofs whirl up the sands	The Last of the Trunk Och Brev I Urval	Mar 2007			From an undated document sent to Tevis Clyde Smith (Herman 2006, p. 159); PD^{L}	Herman 2006, p. 159; Thom, Herman & Woods, § C
Cry Everlasting, The (Lord 1976, p. 302)	24	"Good rede, good rede! Slay ye the Bishop!"	A Rhyme of Salem Town and Other Poems	2002				Lord 1976, p. 302; Herman 2006, p. 159; Thom, Herman & Woods, § C
Cuckoo's Revenge, The	16	I plastered rolls with Belgian cheese	Risque Stories #5	Mar 1987			Letter:^{K} Tevis Clyde Smith, undated (Herman 2006, p. 160)	Herman 2006, p. 160; Thom, Herman & Woods, § C
Custom	27	Crack of a whip in the dusky air	Unaussprechlichen Kulten #1	Oct 1990				Lord 1976, p. 302; Herman 2006, p. 160; Thom, Herman & Woods, § C
Dance Macabre	16	I saw the grass on the hillside bend	Weirdbook #12	1977	Untitled ("I saw the grass on the hillside bend")		Tentative title^{B} (Lord 1976, p. 302)	Lord 1976, p. 302; Herman 2006, p. 160
Dance with Death, The	110	The fogs of night	Magira #38	Spring 1992	The Adventurer's Mistress (2)^{N}; A Dance with Death		From an undated enclosure with a letter to Tevis Clyde Smith; German^{P} (Herman 2006, p. 160)	Lord 1976, p. 302; Herman 2006, p. 160
Dancer	6	I've caught the rhythm of the Universe	The Last of the Trunk Och Brev I Urval	Mar 2007			Letter:^{K} Tevis Clyde Smith, June 23, 1926	
Dancer, The	18	A gibbering wind that whoops and drones	The Last of the Trunk Och Brev I Urval	Mar 2007			Letter:^{K} Tevis Clyde Smith, April 14, 1926 (Herman 2006, p. 160); PD^{L}	Herman 2006, p. 160
Dark are your eyes	10	Dark are your eyes	The Last of the Trunk Och Brev I Urval	Mar 2007	Untitled: Dark are your eyes	Wikisource	Letter:^{K} Tevis Clyde Smith, January 30, 1925 (Herman 2006, p. 220); PD^{L}	Herman 2006, p. 220
Daughter of Evil	44	They cast her out of the court of the king	Chacal #2	Spring 1977	Untitled ("They cast her out of the court of the king ...")		Letter:^{K} Tevis Clyde Smith, c. September 1930 (Herman 2006, p. 160); Tentative title^{B} (Lord 1976, p. 302)	Lord 1976, p. 302; Herman 2006, p. 160
Dawn in Flanders, A	8	I can recall a quiet sky once more	The Howard Collector #5	Summer 1964	Untitled ("I can recall a quiet sky ...")			Lord 1976, p. 172; Herman 2006, p. 160
Day Breaks Over Simla, The	24	Near a million dawns have burst	Fantasy Crossroads #4/5	Aug 1975				Lord 1976, p. 302; Herman 2006, p. 161
Day That I Die, The	36	The day that I die shall the sky be clear	The Howard Collector #9	Spring 1967				Lord 1976, p. 172; Herman 2006, p. 161
"The day that towers ..."	20	The day that towers, sapphire kissed	Always Comes Evening	1957	Nisapur; Untitled ("The day that towers ...")		Originally untitled (Lord 1976, p. 181)	Lord 1976, p. 181; Herman 2006, p. 188
Days of Glory	12	Ah, those were glittering, jeweled days	Night Images	1976	Untitled ("Ah, those were glittering, jeweled days")		Tentative title^{B} (Lord 1976, p. 302)	Lord 1976, p. 302; Herman 2006, p. 161
De Ole River-Ox	21	De ole river-ox come over de ridge	The Grim Land and Others	1976				Lord 1976, p. 302; Herman 2006, p. 161
Dead Man's Hate	28	They hanged John Farrel in the dawn amid the market-place	Weird Tales	Jan 1930		Wikisource	PD^{L}	Lord 1976, p. 172; Herman 2006, p. 161; Howard & Burke 2008, p. X
Dead Slaver's Tale, The	22	Dim and grey was the silent sea	Weirdbook #8	1974	The Tale the Dead Slaver Told			Herman 2006, p. 161; Howard & Burke 2008, p. X
Death's Black Riders (verse heading)	4	The hangman asked of the carrion crow, but the raven made reply	Echoes From An Iron Harp^{A}	1972^{A}			Epigraph:^{S} Death's Black Riders (Lord 1976, p. 203)	Lord 1976, p. 203; Herman 2006, p. 161
Deed Beyond the Deed, The	14	Rane o' the Sword, nae sairly do we greet	The Last of the Trunk Och Brev I Urval	Mar 2007		Wikisource	Letter:^{K} Tevis Clyde Smith, c. December 1928 (Herman 2006, p. 161); PD^{L}	Herman 2006, p. 161
Deep in my bosom ...	8	Deep in my bosom I lock him ...	The Last of the Trunk Och Brev I Urval	Mar 2007			Letter:^{K} Tevis Clyde Smith, undated; did NOT get included in the first edition of COLLECTED POETRY	
Deeps	7	There is a cavern in the deep	The Last of the Trunk Och Brev I Urval	Mar 2007		Wikisource	Letter:^{K} Tevis Clyde Smith, June 23, 1926 (Herman 2006, p. 161); PD^{L}	Herman 2006, p. 161
Del Rio Road			n/a	n/a			Lost^{U}	Thom, Herman & Woods, § C
Demid & Ayub			n/a	n/a			Lost^{U}	Thom, Herman & Woods, § C
Desert, The	7	Wide and free swings the desert, far as reaches the eye	A Rhyme of Salem Town and Other Poems	2002	Untitled ("Wide and free ranging ...")		Tentative title^{B} (Lord 1976, p. 302); An early work^{C} (Lord 1976, p. 302)	Lord 1976, p. 302; Herman 2006, p. 161
Desert Dawn	14	Dim seas of sand swim slowly into sight	Weird Tales	Mar 1939				Lord 1976, p. 172; Herman 2006, p. 162
Desert Hawk, The	48	The burning sun scatters his fiery rays	A Rhyme of Salem Town and Other Poems	2002			An early work^{C} (Lord 1976, p. 303)	Lord 1976, p. 303; Herman 2006, p. 162
Desire	14	"Turn out the light." I raised a willing hand	Desire and Other Erotic Poems	1989	Untitled ("'Turn out the light.' I raised a willing hand")		Tentative title^{B} (Lord 1976, p. 303)	Lord 1976, p. 303; Herman 2006, p. 162
Destination	24	Against the east a somber spire loomed o'er a dusky, brooding wood	Magazine of Horror #12	Winter 1965/1966				Lord 1976, p. 172; Herman 2006, p. 162
Destiny (1)^{N}	4	I think I was born to pass at dawn	Savage Sword of Conan #193	Jan 1992			Tentative title^{B} (Lord 1976, p. 303)	Lord 1976, p. 303; Herman 2006, p. 162
Destiny (2)^{N}	8	What is there...	Shadows of Dreams	1989			Letter:^{K} Tevis Clyde Smith, April 14, 1926 (Herman 2006, p. 162)	Herman 2006, p. 162
Destiny (3)^{N}	2	I am a white trail...	The Last of the Trunk Och Brev I Urval	Mar 2007			Letter:^{K} Tevis Clyde Smith, June 23, 1926 (Herman 2006, p. 162)	Herman 2006, p. 162
Devon Oak (Lord 1976, p. 303)	20	I am a Devon oak	A Rhyme of Salem Town and Other Poems	2002	Untitled ("I am a Devon oak")		Tentative title^{B} (Lord 1976, p. 303)	Lord 1976, p. 303; Herman 2006, p. 162
Dherran Dhoun			n/a	n/a			Lost^{U}	Thom, Herman & Woods, § C
Doc Holliday			n/a	n/a			Lost^{U}	Thom, Herman & Woods, § C
"The doine sidhe sang to our swords ..."	4	The doine sidhe sang to our swords by night	Unaussprechlichen Kulten #1	Oct 1990	Counterspells; Untitled ("The doine sidhe sang to our swords ...")		Tentative title^{B} (Lord 1976, p. 302)	Lord 1976, p. 302; Herman 2006, p. 159; Thom, Herman & Woods, § C
Doom	12	The day of man's set doom is come	A Rhyme of Salem Town and Other Poems	2002	The Wheel of Destiny			Lord 1976, p. 303; Herman 2006, p. 162
Doom Chant of Than-kul, The	25	Atlantis lies in the cold jade sea	Weird Tales #4	1983				Lord 1976, p. 303; Herman 2006, p. 162
Down the Ages	22	Forever down the ages	A Rhyme of Salem Town and Other Poems	2002	Untitled ("Forever down the ages")		Tentative title^{B} (Lord 1976, p. 303); Unfinished (Lord 1976, p. 303)	Lord 1976, p. 303; Herman 2006, p. 162
Drake Sings of Yesterday	62	On Devon downs I met the ghost of Drake	Weirdbook #15	1981				Lord 1976, p. 303; Herman 2006, pp. 162–3
Drawers that a girl strips down her thighs	4	Drawers that a girl strips down her thighs	The Last of the Trunk Och Brev I Urval	Mar 2007	Untitled: Drawers that a girl strips down her thighs	Wikisource	Letter:^{K} Tevis Clyde Smith, c. November 1928 (Herman 2006, p. 221); PD^{L}	Herman 2006, p. 221
A Dream			n/a	n/a			Lost^{U}	Thom, Herman & Woods, § C
Dream and the Shadow, The	14	I dreamed a stony idol striding came	Weird Tales	Sep 1937			Second poem of five from the Sonnets Out of Bedlam cycle	Lord 1976, p. 173; Herman 2006, p. 163
Dream of Autumn, A	12	Now is the lyre of Homer flecked with rust	Weird Tales	April 1933	Autumn; The Autumn of the World		Letter:^{K} Tevis Clyde Smith, C. March 1930 (Herman 2006, p. 151); Originally titled "The Autumn of the World"	Lord 1976, p. 173; Herman 2006, p. 163
The Dream Road			n/a	n/a			Lost^{U}	Thom, Herman & Woods, §
Dreamer	4	I live in a world apart	The Last of the Trunk Och Brev I Urval	Mar 2007		Wikisource	Letter:^{K} Tevis Clyde Smith, June 23, 1926 (Herman 2006, p. 163); PD^{L}	Herman 2006, p. 163
Dreaming	9	The Dreamer dreamed in the shade of the vine	The Last of the Trunk Och Brev I Urval	Mar 2007		Wikisource	Letter:^{K} Tevis Clyde Smith, undated (Herman 2006, p. 163); PD^{L}	Herman 2006, p. 163
Dreaming in Israel	46	If I had dwelt in Israel when Saul was king of Israel	Shadows of Dreams	1989			Letter:^{K} Tevis Clyde Smith, c. August 1932 (Herman 2006, p. 163)	Herman 2006, p. 163
Dreaming on Downs	16	I marched with Alfred when he thundered forth	Poet's Scroll	Apr 1929	King Alfred Rides Again	Wikisource	Pen name: Patrick Howard^{O} (Herman 2006, p. 163);PD^{L}	Herman 2006, p. 163
Dreams	14	Babylon has fallen, has fallen, has fallen	Up John Kane! and Other Poems	1977	Babylon has fallen			Lord 1976, p. 303; Herman 2006, p. 163
Dreams of Men, The	16	From the whispering void unasked they come	Shadows of Dreams	1989			Letter:^{K} Tevis Clyde Smith, c. October 1927 (Herman 2006, p. 163)	Herman 2006, p. 163
Dreams of Nineveh	20	Silver bridge in a broken sky	Golden Atom, 20th Anniversary Issue	1959/1960		Wikisource	PD^{L}	Lord 1976, p. 173; Herman 2006, p. 164
The Driller			n/a	n/a			Lost^{U}	Thom, Herman & Woods, §
Drowned	14	My mother sat me on the cottage stair	Toadstool Wine	1975				Lord 1976, p. 303; Herman 2006, p. 164
Drum, The	14	I heard the drum as I went down the street	A Rhyme of Salem Town and Other Poems	2002	Untitled ("I heard the drum as I went ...")		Tentative title^{B} (Lord 1976, p. 303)	Lord 1976, p. 303; Herman 2006, p. 164
Drum Begins to Throb, A	24	The blind black shadows reach inhuman arms	The Fantasy Fan	Sep 1934	Out of the Deep; Voices Waken Memory, The	Wikisource	PD^{L}; Part 1 of the Voices of the Night cycle	Lord 1976, p. 190; Herman 2006, p. 237
Drum Gods	20	My muscles ripple 'neath my skin	Etchings and Odysseys #9	1986				Lord 1976, p. 303; Herman 2006, p. 164
Drummings on an Empty Skull	16	This is the word that Jacob / Meeting his death in Egypt / Laid on the brow of Judah	The Last of the Trunk Och Brev I Urval	Mar 2007		Wikisource	Letter:^{K} Tevis Clyde Smith, undated (Herman 2006, p. 163); PD^{L}	Herman 2006, p. 164
Drums in My Ears	7	Beyond the creak of rat-gnawed beams in squalid peasant huts	n/a	n/a			Epigraph:^{S} verse heading for Chapter 3 of Sword Woman (Lord 1976, p. 315) Never published separately (Herman 2006, p. 164)	Lord 1976, p. 315; Herman 2006, p. 164
Drums of Pictdom, The	4	How can I wear the harness of toil	Bran Mak Morn	Sep 1969	Untitled ("How can I wear the harness of toil")		Originally untitled (Lord 1976, p. 173)	Lord 1976, p. 173; Herman 2006, p. 164
Dull Sound as of Knocking, A	12	Who raps here on my door tonight	A Rhyme of Salem Town and Other Poems	2002				Lord 1976, p. 303; Herman 2006, p. 164; Howard & Burke 2008, p. X
Dungeon Opens, A	76	They let me out of the slimy cell	Ein Traumer Aus Texas	1987			German^{P} (Herman 2006, p. 164)	Lord 1976, p. 303; Herman 2006, p. 164
Dust Dance, The (1)^{N}	76	Ah, it's little they knew when they molded me	The Howard Collector #10	Spring 1968			Incomplete (Lord 1976, p. 173); Shares lines with version (2) (Lord 1976, p. 173); Letter:^{K} Tevis Clyde Smith, c. March 1928, partial (Herman 2006, p. 165)	Lord 1976, p. 173; Herman 2006, p. 165
Dust Dance, The (2)^{N}	72	For I, with the shape of my kin, the ape	The Howard Collector #7	Winter 1965	Untitled ("For I, with the shape of my kin, the ape ...")		Incomplete (Lord 1976, p. 173); Shares lines with version (1), The Song of Horsa's Galley and The Road to Hell (Lord 1976, p. 173); Letter:^{K} Tevis Clyde Smith, c. March 1928, partial (Herman 2006, p. 165)	Lord 1976, p. 173; Herman 2006, p. 165
Dweller in Dark Valley, The	20	The nightwinds tossed the tangled trees, the stars were cold with scorn	Magazine of Horror #11	Nov 1965				Lord 1976, p. 174; Herman 2006, p. 165; Howard & Burke 2008, p. X
Dying Pirate Speaks of Treasure, A	40	Lash me two round shot hard to my ankles	Up John Kane! and Other Poems	1977				Lord 1976, p. 303; Herman 2006, p. 165
Early in the morning I gazed at the eastern skies	4	Early in the morning I gazed at the eastern skies	The Last of the Trunk Och Brev I Urval	Mar 2007	Untitled: Early in the morning I gazed at the eastern skies	Wikisource	Letter:^{K}Tevis Clyde Smith, June 23, 1926; PD^{L}	Herman 2006, p. 221
Earth-born	28	By rose and verdant valley	Fire and Sleet and Candlelight	1961				Lord 1976, p. 174; Herman 2006, p. 165
East & West			n/a	n/a			Lost^{U}	Thom, Herman & Woods, § C
The East Farers			n/a	n/a			Lost^{U}	Thom, Herman & Woods, § C
The east is red and I am dead	2	The east is red and I am dead	The Collected Letters of Robert E. Howard, Volume 1: 1923-1929	Jun 2007	Untitled: The east is red and I am dead	Wikisource	Letter:^{K} Tevis Clyde Smith, c. January 1928 (Herman 2006, p. 221); PD^{L}	Herman 2006, p. 221
Easter Island	14	How many weary centuries have flown	Weird Tales	Dec 1928		Wikisource	PD^{L}	Lord 1976, p. 174; Herman 2006, p. 165
Echo from the Iron Harp, An	56	Shadows and echoes haunt my dreams	The Ultimate Triumph: The Heroic Fantasy of Robert E. Howard	1999	Nearly identical to The Gold and the Grey		the title "The Gold and the Grey" was given by Glenn Lord to an untitled typescript version, years later he found out what its correct title was; the typescript version includes one extra line ("And the raven came and the lean grey wolf, to follow the sword's red play.") and a few word changes ("Appian Gate" in the former is "Roman Gate" in the latter; "mist" in one is "fog" in the other, and so on) from the published version of "The Gold and The Grey"	Herman 2006, p. 166
Echo of Laughter from the Gulfs, An	18	Ten million miles beyond the sweep of Time	Always Comes Evening	1957	Laughter in the Gulfs		Poem 3 of the Voices of the Night cycle (Herman 2006, p. 179); Letter:^{K} Tevis Clyde Smith, undated (Herman 2006, p. 179)	Lord 1976, p. 179; Herman 2006, p. 179
Echoes from an Anvil	54	I leave no paltry poets	Night Images	1966			Pen name: Robert E. Patrick Howard^{O} (Lord 1976, p. 314)	Lord 1976, p. 314; Herman 2006, p. 166
Echoes from an Iron Anvil			Verses in Ebony	1975			Listed simply as "Echoes from an Anvil" in Thom, Herman & Woods; probable typographical conflation of "Echoes from an Anvil" with "Echoes from an Iron Harp"???	Herman 2006, p. 166
Echoing Shadows [poem cycle]	134	1. The blind black shadows reach inhuman arms / 2. Now in the gloom the pulsing drums repeat / 3. Ten million years beyond the sweep of Time / 4. The great black tower rose to split the stars / 5. A roar of battle thundered in the hills	The Last of the Trunk Och Brev I Urval	Mar 2007	The Iron Harp; Voices of the Night		A group of five poems: "The Voices Waken Memory" (24 lines); "Babel" (19 lines); "Laughter in the Gulfs" (18 lines); "Moon Shame" (34 lines); and "A Crown for a King" (39 lines); Letter:^{K} Tevis Clyde Smith, undated, beginning "The Seeker thrust ..."; Does NOT include the individual poem "The Iron Harp," which is, confusingly, the fourth poem in the BLACK DAWN cycle!	Lord 1976, p. 174; Herman 2006, p. 166
Ecstasy	60	There is a strangeness in my soul	Rhymes of Death	1975	Untitled ("There is a strangeness in my soul")		Tentative title^{B} (Lord 1976, p. 303); shares some stanzas with "A cringing woman's lot is hard"	Lord 1976, p. 303; Herman 2006, p. 166
Ecstasy of Desolation, The	22	Long were the years, lifelong and deathly-bare	Shadows of Dreams	1989	Untitled ("Long were the years, life-long and deathly-bare. ...")		Letter:^{K} Tevis Clyde Smith, c. October 1928 (Herman 2006, p. 166)	Herman 2006, p. 166
Edgar Guest	5	How long have you written, Eddie Guest? How long have you twirled a pen	A Rhyme of Salem Town and Other Poems	2002	Untitled ("How long have you written, Eddie Guest?")		Tentative title^{B} (Lord 1976, p. 303); Unfinished (Lord 1976, p. 303)/(Herman 2006, p. 166)	Lord 1976, p. 303; Herman 2006, p. 166
Egypt	14	Bubastes! Down the lank and sullen years	Whispers #2	Dec 1973				Lord 1976, p. 174; Herman 2006, p. 166
"The elder gods have fled"	4	The elder gods have fled	A Rhyme of Salem Town and Other Poems	2002	Passing of the Elder Gods; Untitled ("The elder gods have fled")		Tentative title^{B} (Lord 1976, p. 308)	Lord 1976, p. 308; Herman 2006, p. 192
Emancipation	20	The couplers lock and the air-brakes grate	Always Comes Evening	1957				Lord 1976, p. 174; Herman 2006, p. 166
Empire	40	Trumpets triumph in red disaster	Verses in Ebony	1975			Pen name: Patrick Mac Conaire Howard^{O} (Lord 1976, p. 299); Shares lines with Black Chant Imperial, which is a shortened version of this poem (Lord 1976, p. 299)/(Herman 2006, p. 167); Subtitled "A Song for All Exiles" (Lord 1976, p. 299)	Lord 1976, p. 299; Herman 2006, p. 167
Empire's Destiny	24	Bab-ilu's women gazed upon our spears	Poet's Scroll	Jun 1929	Oh, Babylon, Lost Babylon	Wikisource	PD^{L}; Pen name: Patrick Howard^{O} (Herman 2006, p. 167)	Herman 2006, p. 167
End of the Glory Trail, The	12	One man fought for a creed and one	Rhymes of Death	1975				Lord 1976, p. 304; Herman 2006, p. 167
Envoy	4	Write whenever you get the chance	The Last of the Trunk Och Brev I Urval	Mar 2007		Wikisource	Letter:^{K} Tevis Clyde Smith, c. November 1932 (Herman 2006, p. 167); PD^{L}	Herman 2006, p. 167
"Eons before the Atlantean days ..."	24	Eons before Atlantean days in the time of the world's black dawn	Ariel^{[Horror]}	Autumn 1976^{[Horror]}	Symbol, The; Untitled ("Eons before the Atlantean days ...")		Tentative title^{B} (Lord 1976, p. 311)	Lord 1976, p. 311; Herman 2006, p. 212; Howard & Burke 2008, p. x
Eric of Norway	219	Eric Ranesen, the Viking, son of the sword and spear	A Rhyme of Salem Town and Other Poems	2002			An early work^{C} (Lord 1976, p. 304)	Lord 1976, p. 304; Herman 2006, p. 167
Escape	7	I'd like to throw over the whole damn thing	A Rhyme of Salem Town and Other Poems	2002				Lord 1976, p. 304; Herman 2006, p. 167
Etchings In Ivory	148 words + 1,001 words + 1,795 words + 331 words + 904 words + 579 words, for a total of 4,758 words	Let no man read here who lives only in the world about him. / This is a dream that comes to me often. / Surely it was in decadent Athens—in marble-throned Athens of Sophocles in the Periclean Age. / There is a gate whose portals are of opal and ivory, and to this gate I went one silent twilight ... / The tang of winter is in the air and in the brain of me. / I knelt in a great cavern before an altar which sent up in everlasting spirals a slender serpent of white smoke. /	Etchings In Ivory (Chapbook)	1968			A brief collection of "prose-poems," consisting of an untitled introduction (148 words), "Flaming Marble" (not to be confused with the verse poem of the same name) (1,001 words), "Skulls and Orchids" (1,795 words), "Medallions in the Moon" (331 words), "The Gods that Men Forget" (904 words), and "Bloodstones and Ebony" (579 words). A brief collection of "prose-poems,"	
Eternity	27	I am older than the world	The Last of the Trunk Och Brev I Urval	Mar 2007		Wikisource	Letter:^{K} Tevis Clyde Smith, June 23, 1926 (Herman 2006, p. 167); PD^{L}	Herman 2006, p. 167
The Everlasting City			n/a	n/a			Lost^{U}	Thom, Herman & Woods, § C
Exhortation	4	Oh, ye who tread the narrow way	A Rhyme of Salem Town and Other Poems	2002	Untitled ("Oh, ye who tread the narrow way")		Tentative title^{B} (Lord 1976, p. 304); An early work^{C} (Lord 1976, p. 304)	Lord 1976, p. 304; Herman 2006, p. 167
A Fable for Critics	98	Now come the days of high endeavor and / The blare of brazen trumpets through the land.	Shadows of Dreams	1989	Untitled ("Now come the days of high endeavor ...")		Letter:^{K} Tevis Clyde Smith, ca. November–December 1928	
The Fable Of Conceit			n/a	n/a			Lost^{U}	Thom, Herman & Woods, § C
Fables for Little Folks	16	He was six foot four and wide as a door	The Daniel Baker Collegian^{G}	15 March 1926		Wikisource	PD^{L}	Lord 1976, p. 175; Herman 2006, p. 167
Far Country, A	24	A granite wind sighed from the crimson clay desert	Shadows of Dreams	1989			Letter:^{K} Tevis Clyde Smith, c. November 1928 (Herman 2006, pp. 167–8)	Herman 2006, pp. 167–8
Far in the Gloomy Northland	24	Far in the gloomy Northland	A Rhyme of Salem Town and Other Poems	2002	Untitled ("Far in the gloomy northland")		Tentative title^{B} (Lord 1976, p. 304); An early work^{C} (Lord 1976, p. 304)	Lord 1976, p. 304; Herman 2006, p. 168
Farewell, Proud Munster	28	Night in the county of Donegal	A Rhyme of Salem Town and Other Poems	2002	Untitled ("Night in the county of Donegal")		Tentative title^{B} (Lord 1976, p. 304); An early work^{C} (Lord 1976, p. 304)	Lord 1976, p. 304; Herman 2006, p. 168
Feach Air Muir Lionadhi Gealach Buidhe Mar Or	31	Mananan Mac Lir	The Junto^{H} Coven13	Aug 1929; Mar 1970		Wikisource	Conflict:^{M} Lord (1976, p. 175), Coven 13, 1970/Herman (2006, p. 168), The Junto, 1929	Lord 1976, p. 175; Herman 2006, p. 168
Fear That Follows, The	24	The smile of a child was on her lips - oh, smile of a last long rest	Singers in the Shadows	1970				Lord 1976, p. 175; Herman 2006, p. 168; Howard & Burke 2008, p. X
Fearsome Touch of Death, The	4	As long as midnight cloaks the earth	Echoes From An Iron Harp^{A}	1972^{A}			Epigraph:^{S} The Fearsome Touch of Death (Lord 1976, p. 203)	Lord 1976, p. 203; Herman 2006, p. 168
February	20	What is so vile as a February day	Always Comes Evening (Underwood-Miller edition)	1977	Parody		The oldest known Howard poem, written January 28, 1921 at Cross Plains High School; Tentative title^{B} (Lord 1976, p. 304); A parody of the famous passage that begins "And what is so rare as a day in June?" from James Russell Lowell's THE VISION OF SIR LAUNFAL (Lord 1976, p. 304); An early work^{C} (Lord 1976, p. 304)	Lord 1976, p. 304; Herman 2006, p. 168
Feud, The	12	He did not glance above the trail to the laurel where I lay	Fantasy Crossroads #13	Jun 1978	Untitled ("He did not glance above the trail ...")		Tentative title^{B} (Lord 1976, p. 304)	Lord 1976, p. 304; Herman 2006, p. 168
Fill up my goblet	15	Fill up my goblet	The Robert E. Howard Foundation Newsletter, vol. 1, #2	Nov 2007	"The Ballad of Baibers"; Untitled: Fill up my goblet; "The Sowers of the Thunder" (truncated)			Herman 2006, p. 221
"The first came up / Was a little cabin boy ..."	5 7-line verses and a 6-line chorus repeated after each one	The first came up / Was a little cabin boy	The Collected Letters of Robert E. Howard, Volume 1: 1923-1929	Jun 2007	The Mermaid; Oh, The Stormy Winds; Untitled: ("The first came up / Was a little cabin boy ...")	https://www.youtube.com/watch?v=BcAPJ77WfCs	Mnemonic reconstruction^{V} of an old folk song Letter:^{K} Robert W. Gordon, February 4, 1925; NOT INCLUDED IN COLLECTED POETRY	
Fitzsimmon's Tale			n/a	n/a			Lost^{U}	Thom, Herman & Woods, § C
Flaming Marble	14	I carved a woman out of marble when	Poet's Scroll	Jan 1929	Untitled ("I carved a woman out of marble when")	Wikisource	PD^{L}; Pen name: Patrick Howard^{O} (Herman 2006, p. 168)	Herman 2006, p. 168
Flaming Marble (not to be confused with the verse poem of the same name)	(1,001 words)	This is a dream that comes to me often	Etchings in Ivory (Chapbook)	1968			First "prose poem" in the Etchings in Ivory cycle	
Flappers flicker and flap and flirt	12	Flappers flicker and flap and flirt	The Last of the Trunk Och Brev I Urval	Mar 2007	Untitled: Flappers flicker and flap and flirt	Wikisource	Letter:^{K} Tevis Clyde Smith, c. December 1928 (Herman 2006, p. 221); PD^{L}	Herman 2006, p. 221
Flight	24	A jackal laughed from a thicket still, the stars were haggard pale	Witchcraft & Sorcery	May 1971	Untitled ("A jackal laughed from a thicket still ...")		Letter:^{K} Tevis Clyde Smith, c. September 1927, earlier, shorter version (Herman 2006, p. 168)	Lord 1976, p. 175; Herman 2006, p. 168
Flint's Passing	30	Bring aft the rum! Life's measure's overfull	Fantasy Crossroads #3	May 1975				Lord 1976, p. 304; Herman 2006, p. 169
Flood, The			The Ghost Ocean and Other Poems of the Supernatural	1982	To All Evangelists			Herman 2006, p. 169
Follower, The	20	I am the man who followed	The Golden Caliph^{I} The Last Celt	1922/1923; 1976			Conflict:^{M} Lord (1976, p. 175), The Last Celt, 1976/Herman (2006, p. 169), The Golden Caliph, 1922–23; An early work^{C} (Lord 1976, p. 175)	Lord 1976, p. 175; Herman 2006, p. 169
"For I have seen the lizards crawl"	16	For I have seen the lizards crawl	Always Comes Evening	1957	Babylon; Untitled ("For I have seen the lizards crawl")		Originally untitled (Lord 1976, p. 171)	Lord 1976, p. 171; Herman 2006, p. 152; Thom, Herman & Woods, § B
"For I, with the shape of my kin, the ape ..." (2)^{N}	72	For I, with the shape of my kin, the ape	The Howard Collector #7	Winter 1965	Dust Dance, The; Untitled ("For I, with the shape of my kin, the ape ...")		Incomplete (Lord 1976, p. 173); Shares lines with version (1), The Song of Horsa's Galley and The Road to Hell (Lord 1976, p. 173); Letter:^{K} Tevis Clyde Smith, c. March 1928, partial (Herman 2006, p. 165)	Lord 1976, p. 173; Herman 2006, p. 165
For Man Was Given the Earth to Rule	44	The mallet clashes on the nail	Fantasy Book #21	September 1986	And Man Was Given the Earth to Rule; The Old Gods Brood		Listed as "And . . ." in Fantasy Book;"The Old Gods Brood" is from Glenn Lord's title to an untitled typescript.	Lord 1976, p. 308; Herman 2006, p. 169
For what is a maid to the shout of kings?	14	For what is a maid to the shout of kings	A Rhyme of Salem Town and Other Poems	2002	Untitled: For what is a maid to the shout of kings		Incomplete, only the final fourteen lines survive (Lord 1976, p. 312)	Lord 1976, p. 312; Herman 2006, p. 221
Forbidden Magic	14	There came to me a Shape one summer night	Weird Tales	Jul 1929		Wikisource	PD^{L}	Lord 1976, p. 175; Herman 2006, p. 169
"Forever down the ages"	22	Forever down the ages	A Rhyme of Salem Town and Other Poems	2002	Down the Ages; Untitled ("Forever down the ages")		Tentative title^{B} (Lord 1976, p. 303); Unfinished (Lord 1976, p. 303)	Lord 1976, p. 303; Herman 2006, p. 162
Forgotten Gods			n/a	n/a			Lost^{U}	Thom, Herman & Woods, § C
"Forth from the purple ..."	12	Forth from the purple and feats of the palace	The Grim Land and Others	1976	Outcast, The; Untitled ("Forth from the purple ...")		Tentative title^{B} (Lord 1976, p. 308)	Lord 1976, p. 308; Herman 2006, p. 191
Fragment	35	And so his boyhood wandered into youth	Weird Tales	Dec 1937	And So His Boyhood Wandered Into Youth		Wikisource	Lord 1976, p. 175; Herman 2006, p. 169; Howard & Burke (2008, p. x)
A Fragment	5	Oh, Caroline, won't you be mine?	The Collected Letters of Robert E. Howard, Volume 1: 1923-1929	Jun 2007			Mnemonic reconstruction^{V} of an old folk song, still unidentified; Letter:^{K} Robert W. Gordon, April 9, 1926; NOT INCLUDED IN COLLECTED POETRY	
Freedom	8	The world is rife, say I	A Rhyme of Salem Town and Other Poems	2002	Untitled ("The world is rife, say I")		Tentative title^{B} (Lord 1976, p. 304)	Lord 1976, p. 304; Herman 2006, p. 169
"From the dim red dawn of Creation"	34	From the dim red dawn of Creation	Always Comes Evening^{A}	1957^{A}	Men of the Shadows (verse heading); Untitled ("From the dim red dawn of Creation")		From:^{T} Men of the Shadows (Lord 1976, p. 180); Originally untitled (Lord 1976, p. 180)	Lord 1976, p. 180; Herman 2006, p. 184
Futility (1)^{N}	16	Golden goats on a hillside black	Weird Tales	Nov 1937	Moonlight on a Skull		Very similar to Moonlight on a Skull (Lord 1976, p. 175)/(Herman 2006, p. 170)	Lord 1976, p. 175; Herman 2006, p. 170
Futility (2)^{N}	30	Time races on and none can stay the tread	The Daniel Baker Collegian^{G}	25 May 1926			PD^{L}	Lord 1976, p. 176; Herman 2006, p. 170
Gates of Babylon, The	25	The gates of Babylon stand ajar	The Ghost OCean and Other Poems of the Supernatural	1982				Lord 1976, p. 304; Herman 2006, p. 170
Gates of Nineveh, The	16	These are the gates of Nineveh; here	Weird Tales	Jul 1928		Wikisource	PD^{L}	Lord 1976, p. 176; Herman 2006, p. 170
Genghis Khan			n/a	n/a			Lost^{U}	Thom, Herman & Woods, § C
The Geologist			n/a	n/a			Lost^{U}	Thom, Herman & Woods, § C
Ghost Dancers	32	Night has come over ridge and hill	Writer of the Dark	1986				Lord 1976, p. 304; Herman 2006, p. 170
Ghost Kings, The	12	The ghost kings are marching; the midnight knows their tread	Weird Tales	Dec 1938				Lord 1976, p. 176; Herman 2006, p. 170
Ghost Ocean, The	16	There is a sea and a silent moon	The Ghost Ocean and Other Poems of the Supernatural	1982	Untitled ("There is a sea and a silent moon")		Tentative title^{B} (Lord 1976, p. 304)	Lord 1976, p. 304; Herman 2006, p. 171
Gilhooley's Supper Party	8	There was ham and lamb	The Collected Letters of Robert E. Howard, Volume 1: 1923-1929	Jun 2007	The Jubilee;		Mnemonic reconstruction^{V} of "Gilhooley's Supper Party"; Letter:^{K} Robert W. Gordon, March 17, 1927; NOT INCLUDED IN COLLECTED POETRY	
Girl	8	Gods, what a handsome youth across the way	The Last of the Trunk Och Brev I Urval	Mar 2007		Wikisource	Letter:^{K} Tevis Clyde Smith, June 23, 1926 (Herman 2006, p. 171); PD^{L}	Herman 2006, p. 171
The Girl From Yesterday			n/a	n/a			Lost^{U}	Thom, Herman & Woods, § C
Girls			The Toreador	5 July 1925				Herman 2006, p. 171
Give ye of my best though the dole be meager	8	Give ye of my best though the dole be meager	The Last of the Trunk Och Brev I Urval	Mar 2007	Untitled: Give ye of my best though the dole be meager	Wikisource	Letter:^{K} Tevis Clyde Smith, June 23, 1926 (Herman 2006, p. 222); PD^{L}	Herman 2006, p. 222
Gladiator and the Lady, The	14	When I was a boy in Britain and you were a girl in Rome	Shadows of Dreams	1989			Letter:^{K} Tevis Clyde Smith, c. April 1930 (Herman 2006, p. 171)	Herman 2006, p. 171
A God Comes Striding			n/a	n/a			Lost^{U}	Thom, Herman & Woods, § C
Gods I Worshipped, The	8	The standards toss in pride	A Rhyme of Salem Town and Other Poems	2002				Herman 2006, p. 171
Gods of Easter Island, The	14	Long ere Priapus pranced through groves Arcadian sunlight kissed	Always Comes Evening	1957	Untitled ("Long ere Priapus ...")		Originally untitled (Lord 1976, p. 176)	Lord 1976, p. 176; Herman 2006, p. 171
"Gods of heather, gods of lake"	34	Gods of heather, god of lake	Always Comes Evening	1957	Rune; Rune of the Ancient One; Untitled ("Gods of heather, gods of lake")		From:^{T} the short story Men of the Shadows (Lord 1976, p. 185); Originally untitled (Lord 1976, p. 185); Separate version called Rune of the Ancient One (Herman 2006, p. 200)	Lord 1976, p. 185; Herman 2006, p. 200
Gods of the Jungle Drums, The	27	Mutter of drums, jungle drums	The Grim Land and Others	1976				Lord 1976, p. 304; Herman 2006, p. 171
Gods Remember, The (1)^{N}	16	Lost wonders of the ages	The Collected Letters of Robert E. Howard, Volume 1: 1923-1929	Jun 2007			An early draft of version (2); a list of Howard poems compiled by Otis Adelbert Kline indicates that there was a 50-line version, now lost (Herman 2006, p. 171); Letter:^{K} Tevis Clyde Smith, c. October 1927 (Herman 2006, p. 171); PD^{L}	Herman 2006, p. 171
Gods Remember, The (2)^{N}	16	The glories of the ages	Etchings and Odysseys #9	1986		Wikisource		Lord 1976, p. 304; Herman 2006, p. 171
The Gods that Men Forget	(904 words)	The tang of winter is in the air and in the brain of me.	Etchings in Ivory (Chapbook)	1968			Fourth "prose poem" in the Etchings in Ivory cycle	
Gold and the Grey, The	55	Shadows and echoes haunt my dreams with dim and subtle pain	The Gold and the Grey	1974	An Echo from the Iron Harp (some differences)		Tentative title^{B}--"The Gold and the Grey" was the title given by Glenn Lord to an untitled typescript version; years later he found out what its correct title was. The typescript version includes one extra line ("And the raven came and the lean grey wolf, to follow the sword's red play.") and a few word changes ("Appian Gate" in the former is "Roman Gate" in the latter; "mist" in one is "fog" in the other, and so on) from the published version of "The Gold and The Grey" (Lord 1976, p. 304)	Lord 1976, p. 304; Herman 2006, p. 171
Golden Ruin			n/a	n/a			Lost^{U}	Thom, Herman & Woods, § C
Good Mistress Brown	20	A sturdy housewife was Mistress Brown	Desire and Other Erotic Poems	1989	Untitled ("A sturdy housewife was Mistress Brown ...")		Tentative title^{B} (Lord 1976, p. 304)	Lord 1976, p. 304; Herman 2006, p. 172
"The great gray oaks ..."	5	The great grey oaks by the banks of the river	A Rhyme of Salem Town and Other Poems	2002	Oaks, The; Untitled ("The great gray oaks ...")		Tentative title^{B} (Lord 1976, p. 308)	Lord 1976, p. 308; Herman 2006, p. 189
Great Man Speaks, A	14	They set me up on high, a marble saint	The Collected Letters of Robert E. Howard, Volume 1: 1923-1929	Jun 2007		Wikisource	Letter:^{K} Tevis Clyde Smith, c. November 1928 (Herman 2006, p. 172); PD^{L}	Herman 2006, p. 172
Grey God Passes, The	4	Oh Masters of the North, we come with tally of remembered dead	Echoes From An Iron Harp^{A}	1972^{A}	Conn's Saga		Epigraph:^{S} The Grey God Passes (Lord 1976, p. 204)	Lord 1976, p. 204; Herman 2006, p. 172
Grey Lover, The	8	Lover, grey lover, your arms are about me	The Collected Letters of Robert E. Howard, Volume 1: 1923-1929	Jun 2007		Wikisource	Letter:^{K} Tevis Clyde Smith, c. January 1928 (Herman 2006, p. 172); PD^{L}	Herman 2006, p. 172
Grey Seas			n/a	n/a			Lost^{U}	Thom, Herman & Woods, § C
Grim Land, The	28	From Sonora to Del Rio is a hundred barren miles	The Grim Land and Others	1976			Shares lines with Sonora to Del Rio (Lord 1976, p. 304); Letter:^{K} to H. P. Lovecraft, June 1931 (Herman 2006, p. 172)	Lord 1976, p. 304; Herman 2006, p. 172
Guise of Youth, The	20	Men say my years are few; yet I am old	Science-Fantasy Correspondent #1	Dec 1975	Untitled ("Men say my years ...")		Tentative title^{B} (Lord 1976, p. 307)	Lord 1976, p. 307; Herman 2006, p. 172
Hadrian's Wall	14	Against these stones red waves of carnage break	Singers in the Shadows	1970				Lord 1976, p. 176; Herman 2006, p. 172
Hairy-Chested Idealist Sings, A	52	I was drunk, drunk, drunk	The Junto^{H}	Oct 1928	[Sometimes presented without the hyphen]			Lord 1976, p. 307; Herman 2006, p. 172
"Hark, hark, the jackals bark ..."	41	Hark, hark, the jackals bark	Fantasy Crossroads #7	Feb 1976	Madame Goose's Rhymes; Untitled ("Hark, hark, the jackals bark ...")		Tentative title^{B} (Lord 1976, p. 306)	Lord 1976, p. 306; Herman 2006, p. 183
Harlot, The	12	Mrs. Crown was a dame of the town	Risque Stories #3	Jul 1985	A Harlot			Lord 1976, p. 307; Herman 2006, pp. 172–173
The Harlot's House			n/a	n/a			Lost^{U}	Thom, Herman & Woods, § C
Harp of Alfred, The	18	I heard the harp of Alfred	Weird Tales	Sep 1928		Wikisource	PD^{L}	Lord 1976, p. 176; Herman 2006, p. 173
Harvest	4	We reap and bind the bitter yield	The Howard Collector	Autumn 1972	Untitled ("We reap and bind the bitter yield")		Originally untitled (Lord 1976, p. 176)	Lord 1976, p. 176; Herman 2006, p. 173
Hate's Dawn	18	I pinned him hard in a vacant trench	The Junto^{H}	Jul 1929	Son of Spartacus			Lord 1976, p. 307; Herman 2006, p. 173
A haunting cadence fills the night with fierce	58	A haunting cadence fills the night with fierce ...	Yesteryear #4	Oct 1989	Untitled: A haunting cadence fills the night			Herman 2006, p. 222
Haunting Columns	14	The walls of Luxor broke the silver sand	Weird Tales	Feb 1938			Fourth poem of five from the Sonnets Out of Bedlam cycle' (Herman 2006, p. 173)	Lord 1976, p. 177; Herman 2006, p. 173
The Haunting of Cormac Dubh			n/a	n/a			Lost^{U}	Thom, Herman & Woods, § C
He clutched his penis tight	4	He clutched his penis tight	The Collected Letters of Robert E. Howard, Volume 1: 1923-1929	Jun 2007	Untitled: He clutched his penis tight	Wikisource	Letter:^{K} Tevis Clyde Smith, c. November 1928 (Herman 2006, p. 222); PD^{L}	Herman 2006, p. 222
"He did not glance above the trail ..."	12	He did not glance above the trail to the laurel where I lay	Fantasy Crossroads #13	Jun 1978	Feud, The; Untitled ("He did not glance above the trail ...")		Tentative title^{B} (Lord 1976, p. 304)	Lord 1976, p. 304; Herman 2006, p. 168
"He has rigged her and tricked her"	5	He has rigged her and tricked her	A Rhyme of Salem Town and Other Poems	2002	Stralsund, The; Untitled ("He has rigged her and tricked her")		Tentative title^{B} (Lord 1976, p. 311)	Lord 1976, p. 311; Herman 2006, p. 211
Heart of the Sea's Desire, The	28	The stars beat up from the shadowy sea	Always Comes Evening	1957	Mate of the Sea		Title created by Dale Hart for an untitled version but another draft was later found with the title Mate of the Sea (Herman 2006, p. 173)	Lord 1976, p. 177; Herman 2006, p. 173
The helmsman gaily, rode down the rickerboo	7	The helmsman gaily, rode down the rickerboo	The Last of the Trunk Och Brev I Urval	Mar 2007	Untitled: The helmsman gaily, rode down the rickerboo	Wikisource	Letter:^{K} Tevis Clyde Smith, June 22, 1923 (Herman 2006, p. 222); PD^{L}	Herman 2006, p. 222
"Here where the post oaks crown the ridge"	39	Here where the post oaks crown the ridge, and the dreary sand-drifts lie	A Robert E. Howard Memorial: June 13–15, 1986	1986	Sand-Hills' Crest, The; Untitled: ("Here where the post oaks crown the ridge")		Tentative title^{B} (Lord 1976, p. 310)	Lord 1976, p. 310; Herman 2006, p. 201
Heritage (1)^{N}	30	My people came from Munster and the cold north Nevis side	The Junto^{H} The Howard Collector #10	Aug 1929; Spring 1968			Conflict:^{M} Lord (1976, p. 177), The Howard Collector, 1968/Herman (2006, p. 174), The Junto, 1929	Lord 1976, p. 177; Herman 2006, p. 174
Heritage (2)^{N}	12	Saxon blood in the veins of me	Fantasy Crossroads #2	Feb 1975				Lord 1976, p. 307; Herman 2006, p. 174
"H'Id like to see Cheapside go up in flames"	4	H'Id like to see Cheapside go up in flames	The Collected Letters of Robert E. Howard, Volume 1: 1923-1929	Jun 2007	Untitled: ("H'Id like to see Cheapside go up in flames")		Letter:^{K} Tevis Clyde Smith, contained in the untitled story "Hatrack!"; NOT INCLUDED IN COLLECTED POETRY	
High Blue Halls	20	There's a kingdom far from the sun and star	The Collected Letters of Robert E. Howard, Volume 1: 1923-1929	Jun 2007	The High Blue Halls	Wikisource	Letter:^{K} Tevis Clyde Smith, c. April 1929 (Herman 2006, p. 174); PD^{L}	Herman 2006, p. 174
"A high land and a hill land!"		A high land and a hill land!	Unpublished	n/a	Untitled: ("A high land and a hill land!")		handwritten, discovered among the Tevis Clyde Smith papers at Texas A & M University	Thom, Herman & Woods
"High on his throne Baal-Pteor sat"	6	High on his throne Baal-pteor sat	A Rhyme of Salem Town and Other Poems	2002	Baal-pteor; Untitled ("High on his throne Baal-Pteor sat")		Tentative title^{B} (Lord 1976, p. 301)	Lord 1976, p. 301; Herman 2006, p. 151; Thom, Herman & Woods, § B
"High on his throne sat Bran Mak Morn"	72	High on this throne sat Bran Mak Morn	Bran Mak Morn	Sep 1969	Song of the Race, A; Untitled ("High on his throne sat Bran Mak Morn")		Originally untitled (Lord 1976, p. 188); A Bran Mak Morn poem	Lord 1976, p. 188; Herman 2006, p. 210
"High the towers and mighty ..."	43	High the towers and mighty the walls, oh, proud-crested sons of Babylon	A Rhyme of Salem Town and Other Poems	2002	Who Shall Sing of Babylon?; Untitled ("High the towers and mighty ...")		Tentative title^{B} (Lord 1976, p. 314)	Lord 1976, p. 314; Herman 2006, p. 240
The Highwaymen	16	The first great man that ever I robbed	The Collected Letters of Robert E. Howard, Volume 1: 1923-1929	Jun 2007	Untitled: ("The first great man that ever I robbed ...")	http://mudcat.org/thread.cfm?threadid=29243 ; https://www.youtube.com/watch?v=MD4Nd_rzNWg	Mnemonic reconstruction^{V} of "Allan Tyne of Harrow" aka "Valentine of Harrow" Letter:^{K} Robert W. Gordon, misdated January 2, 1926—actually 1927; NOT INCLUDED IN COLLECTED POETRY	
Hills of Kandahar, The	28	The night primeval breaks in scarlet mist	Weird Tales	Jun-July 1939				Lord 1976, p. 177; Herman 2006, p. 174
Hills of the North! Lavender hills	7	Hills of the North! Lavender hills	The Last of the Trunk Och Brev I Urval	Mar 2007	Untitled: Hills of the North! Lavender hills	Wikisource	Letter:^{K} Tevis Clyde Smith, January 30, 1925 (Herman 2006, p. 222); PD^{L}	Herman 2006, p. 222
"Ho, for a trail that is bloody and long!"	4	Ho, for a trail that is bloody and long	A Rhyme of Salem Town and Other Poems	2002	Trail's End; Untitled ("Ho, for a trail that is bloody and long!")		Tentative title^{B} (Lord 1976, p. 312); Possibly incomplete (Lord 1976, p. 312); From:^{T} Originally embodied as an untitled verse in an untitled story ("As he approached the two ...") (Lord 1976, p. 312)	Lord 1976, p. 312; Herman 2006, p. 217
Ho, ho, the long lights lift amain	Putatively, 16 lines—In the original letter, the entire poem is written out like a paragraph of prose	Ho, ho, the long lights lift amain	The Last of the Trunk Och Brev I Urval	Mar 2007	Untitled: Ho, ho, the long lights lift amain		Letter:^{K} Tevis Clyde Smith, c. June 1928 (Herman 2006, p. 223)	Herman 2006, p. 223
Ho merry bark, let's go." ...		Ho merry bark, let's go." ...	The Right Hook^{I} vol. 1, #2	1925	Untitled: Ho merry bark, let's go." ...		Clearly inspired by "Canoe Song of the North" by Chester Firkins, the second verse of which reads: "Past reedy isles where summer smiles, / Ho, merry bark, let's go / And find the way of Nicollet — / The footsteps of Perrot!"	Herman 2006, p. 223
The Home-coming of Solomon (1)^{N}	44	The white gulls wheeled above the cliffs, the air was slashed with foam	Fanciful Tales	Fall 1936	Solomon Kane's Homecoming; Solomon Kane's Home-coming	Wikisource	Original version; A Solomon Kane poem; PD^{L}	Lord 1976, p. 186; Herman 2006, pp. 205–206
Hope Empty of Meaning	8	Man is a fool and a blinded toy	The Howard Collector	Autumn 1971				Lord 1976, p. 177; Herman 2006, p. 174
Hopes of Dreams	20	Sunfire caught in a windy mesh	Witchcraft & Sorcery	1972				Lord 1976, p. 177; Herman 2006, p. 174
Hour of the Dragon, The	6	The Lion banner sways and falls in the horror-haunted gloom	The Howard Collector^{A}	Spring 1969^{A}			Epigraph:^{S} The Hour of the Dragon (Lord 1976, p. 204)	Lord 1976, p. 204; Herman 2006, p. 174
House in the Oaks, The	Three quatrains for a total of 12	Beyond the Veil what gulfs of Time and Space? / Drowsy and dull with ages the houses blink / Tread not where stony deserts hold	Dark Things^{A}	1971^{A}	Children of the Night		Three verses--"An Open Window," "Arkham," and "The Children of the Night"—embedded in the text of the story The House in the Oaks (Herman 2006, p. 174); Justin Geoffrey^{R} (Herman 2006, p. 174)	Lord 1976, p. 204; Herman 2006, p. 174
The House of Arabu (Verse heading)	7	To the house whence no one issues ...				"This quote, ascribed to 'Babylonian Legend of Ishtar,' is from an actual historical document. Also known as 'The Descent of Ishtar to the Nether World,' it is among the earliest surviving religious/mythological texts. Howard's version of it appears to be quoted from Morals in Ancient Babylon, by Joseph McCabe, Little Blue Book #1076, with very minor modification."—Rusty Burke		
"The House of Asgaard passes ..."	8	The House of Asgard passes with the night	The Howard Collector #14	Spring 1971	Untitled ("The House of Asgaard passes ..."); Untitled: (No More the Serpent Prow)		Originally untitled (Lord 1976, p. 181)	Lord 1976, p. 181; Herman 2006, p. 188
House of Gael, The	12	The ancient boast, the ancient song	A Rhyme of Salem Town and Other Poems	2002	Untitled ("The ancient boast, the ancient song")		Tentative title^{B} (Lord 1976, p. 307)	Lord 1976, p. 307; Herman 2006, p. 174
The House of Hell			n/a	n/a	KABRANE THE GREEK		Lost^{U}; the two titles are listed as alternatives in the Otis Adelbert Kline agency's list of Howard poems still unaccounted for	Thom, Herman & Woods, § C
"How can I wear the harness of toil"	4	How can I wear the harness of toil	Bran Mak Morn	Sep 1969	Drums of Pictdom, The; Untitled ("How can I wear the harness of toil")		Originally untitled (Lord 1976, p. 173)	Lord 1976, p. 173; Herman 2006, p. 164
"How long have you written, Eddie Guest?"	5	How long have you written, Eddie Guest? How long have you twirled a pen	A Rhyme of Salem Town and Other Poems	2002	Edgar Guest; Untitled ("How long have you written, Eddie Guest?")		Tentative title^{B} (Lord 1976, p. 303); Unfinished (Lord 1976, p. 303)/(Herman 2006, p. 166)	Lord 1976, p. 303; Herman 2006, p. 166
How to Select a Successful Evangelist	14	First, find a man who has a goodly voice	The Last of the Trunk Och Brev I Urval	Mar 2007		Wikisource	Letter:^{K} Tevis Clyde Smith, c. March 1928 (Herman 2006, p. 175); PD^{L}	Herman 2006, p. 175
How your right thudded on my jaw	9	How your right thudded on my jaw	Robert E. Howard's Fight Magazine #4	Oct 1996	Slugger's Vow		Letter:^{K} Tevis Clyde Smith, January 30, 1925 (Herman 2006, p. 205)	Herman 2006, p. 205
A hundred years the great war raged	4	A hundred years the great war raged	The Last of the Trunk Och Brev I Urval	Mar 2007	Untitled: A hundred years the great war raged	Wikisource	Letter:^{K} Tevis Clyde Smith, August 4, 1923 (Herman 2006, p. 223); PD^{L}	Herman 2006, p. 223
Hy-Brasil	52	There's a far, lone island in the dim, red West	The Ghost Ocean and Other Poems of the Supernatural	1982	The Isle of Hy-Brasil		Shares lines with Ships (Lord 1976, p. 307)	Lord 1976, p. 307; Herman 2006, p. 175
Hymn of Hatred	12	Oh, brother coiling in the acrid grass	Always Comes Evening	1957			Shares lines with A Rattlesnake Sings in the Grass (Lord 1976, p. 177)	Lord 1976, p. 177; Herman 2006, p. 175

== Notes ==
Further explanations

- ^A These publications/dates indicate where and when these headings were first published independently of the works to which they were originally attached. (Lord 1976, p. 106)
- ^B These tentative titles were used by Glenn Lord as a means to identify the poems where no original title was available. (Lord 1976, pp. 106–107)
- ^C An early work is defined as one believed to have been written before 1924. (Lord 1976, p. 107)

Notes on publications

- ^D The Tattler was the newspaper of Brownwood High School. (Lord 1976, p. 107)
- ^E The Cross Plains Review is the weekly newspaper for Cross Plains, Texas. (Lord 1976, p. 107)
- ^F The Yellow Jacket is the newspaper of Howard Payne College. (Lord 1976, p. 107)
- ^G The Daniel Baker Collegian was the newspaper of Daniel baker College of Brownwood; the college has since merged with Howard Payne College. (Lord 1976, p. 107)
- ^H The Junto was a literary travelogue circulated from member to member on a mailing list from 1928 to 1930. (Lord 1976, p. 341)
- ^I The Golden Caliph (1922 or 1923, one issue) and The Right Hook (1925, three issues) were amateur magazines created by Robert E. Howard and Tevis Clyde Smith as teenagers. (Herman 2006, pp. 407 & 427)
- ^J The Progress was published by Cross Plains High School.

Notes on short hand

- ^K All or part of these poems are from or were included in a letter from Robert E. Howard to some recipient (the date is either the explicit date on the letter, an approximate dating of the letter where possible or else simply marked undated). e.g. "Letter: Tevis Clyde Smith, June 23, 1926" indicates that the poem is from a letter to Tevis Clyde Smith dated June 23, 1926.
- ^L These poems are in the public domain in the United States and any country where the Rule of the Shorter Term applies. (Herman 2007, Poems)
- ^M With these poems, two or more sources give different publications and dates of the first appearance. e.g. "Conflict: Lord (1976, p. 186), The Howard Collector, 1962/Herman (2006, p. 204), The Junto, 1929" indicates that Lord (1976, p. 186) states first publication as The Howard Collector (published in 1962), while Herman (2006, p. 204) states first publication as The Junto (published in 1929). Always listed with the earliest date first.
- ^N Howard sometimes used the same title more than once, or the same title has been attached to untitled works by others. In these cases the poems have been numbered to distinguish them. e.g. "(2)" following the title indicates that this the second poem with the same name.
- ^O These poems were published under a pen name. e.g. "Pen name: Patrick Howard" indicated that the poem was published under the pen name Patrick Howard.
- ^P These poems were first published in a non-American publication. e.g. "French" indicates that it was first published in a French book or magazine.
- ^R These poems are attributed to "Justin Geoffrey," a fictional poet Howard created for his fiction.
- ^S These poems were originally used as epigraphs, heading chapter and whole stories, in works of prose fiction. This list shows where they were printed separately from the prose. e.g. "Epigraph: The Phoenix on the Sword" indicates that the poem was used as an opening in the short story The Phoenix on the Sword.
- ^T These poems were part of a different work, usually prose fiction, but were not used to open the work or head chapters. This list shows where they were printed separately from the main work, if at all. e.g. "From: Men of the Shadows" indicates that this poem was originally included in, or part of, the short storyMen of the Shadows.
- ^U Poems with these titles are on record but no known copy exists today.
- ^V Howard had an amazing ability to memorize poetry on one or two readings, and songs from a single hearing, and would often cite it from memory—with the inevitable discrepancies. The departures from the original wording carry enough flavor of the Howard style to be of note here. Most of these came from letters to Robert W. Gordon, editor of the ‘’Adventure’’ magazine column “Old Songs That Men Have Sung” from 1923–1927, and later the first head of the Archive of American Folk Song at the Library of Congress.

== See also ==
- List of works by Robert E. Howard
