= Heup Young Kim =

South Korean theologian (born 1949)

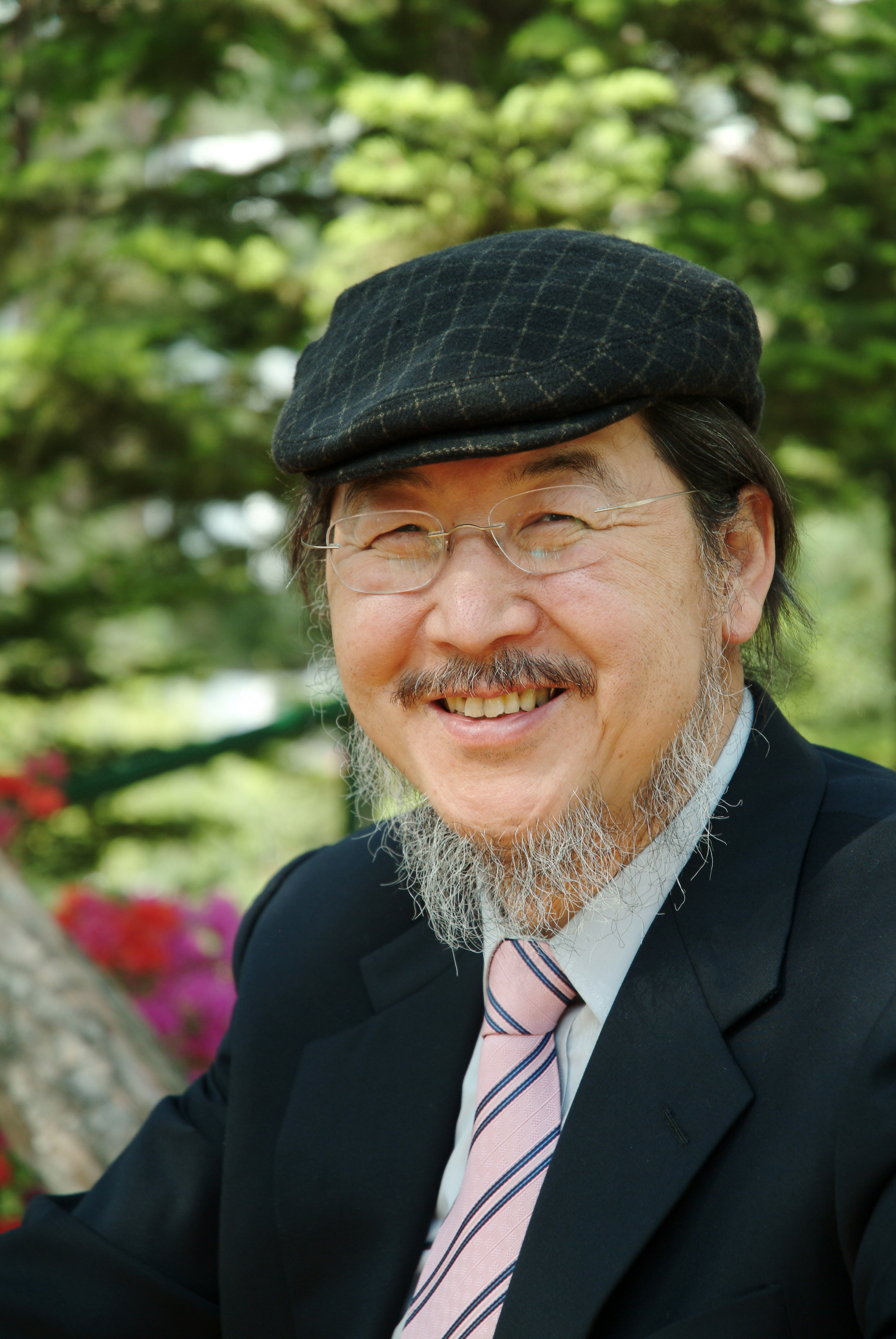

Heup Young Kim (Korean: 김흡영; Hanja: 金洽榮; born January 1949) is a Korean Christian theologian and a scholar of East Asian religions, particularly Confucianism and Daoism (scholar). He specializes in Asian constructive theology, interfaith dialogue, religion and science (books), and is a leading proponent and architect of the Theology of Dao (Theo-dao), which integrates Christian theology with East Asian wisdom traditions.

Kim is the founding director of the Korea Forum for Science and Life and was the Distinguished Asian Theologian in Residence at the Graduate Theological Union. He served as a Professor of Systematic Theology at Kangnam University in South Korea, where he also held positions as a dean of the College of Humanities and Liberal Arts, the Graduate School of Theology, and the University Chapel.

Kim is one of the founding members and fellows of the International Society for Science and Religion and serves as an Advisor to the Yale Forum on Religion and Ecology. He was a co-moderator of the 6th and 7th Congress of Asian Theologians and a past president of the Korean Society of Systematic Theology.

In September 2022, Kim was invited as a reference person to the 11th Assembly of the World Council of Churches held in Karlsruhe, Germany. He also serves on the writing committee for the "Guideline on Confucianism" for the Dicastery for Interreligious Dialogue at the Vatican Holy See and participates in the Artificial Intelligence Asia Research Group at the Dicastery for Culture and Education Digital Centre.

== Early life ==
Heup Young Kim is from Museom Village in Yeongju, Gyeongsangbuk-do, South Korea. The village is recognized as a National Confucian Culture Preservation Village and is famous for its single-log bridge. His family’s ancestral mansion, Haeudang, has been designated a National Folk Heritage site. He attended Kyunggi High School, Korea's most prestigious high school, and graduated from the College of Engineering at Seoul National University.

Kim began his professional career as an airplane engineer with Korean Air Lines before transitioning to the corporate sector, joining the Planning Office of Daewoo Corporation. During South Korea's rapid economic growth in the 1970s, he worked as the New York City representative for Samhwa Corporation, a general trading company specializing in importing and exporting goods.

During this period, Kim underwent a profound religious conversion from Confucianism to Christianity. This transformative experience led him to leave his corporate career and pursue theological studies, laying the foundation for his influential work in theology and interfaith dialogue.

== Academic life ==
Heup Young Kim earned an M.Div. and Th.M. from Princeton Theological Seminary and a Ph.D. from the Graduate Theological Union (GTU) in Berkeley, California, under the guidance of theologian Claude Welch. His academic work spans Asian constructive theology, interreligious dialogue, comparative theology, and the intersection of science and religion.

Kim has held prestigious research and fellowship positions, including serving as a senior fellow at the Center for the Study of World Religions at Harvard University and the Center for Interdisciplinary Study of Monotheistic Religions at Doshisha University. He has also been a visiting fellow at the Centre for Advanced Religious and Theological Studies at the University of Cambridge and the University of Oxford, as well as a visiting scholar at the Center for Theology and the Natural Sciences (CTNS) at the Graduate Theological Union.

Throughout his career, Kim has received numerous honors, including the Graduate Theological Union Alum of the Year award in 2009, a Global Perspectives on Science and Spirituality research grant (2005–2006), a John Templeton Research Grant (2004–2005), and the Most Distinguished Research Professor Award from Kangnam University in 2003.

Kim has published extensively in the areas of interfaith dialogue, theology of religions, Asian theology, and science and religion. His notable works include monographs such as Wang Yang-ming and Karl Barth: A Confucian-Christian Dialogue (1996), Christ and the Tao (2003), and A Theology of Dao (2017). He has contributed chapters to several influential volumes, including *The Cambridge Companion to the Trinity(2011), Religion and Transhumanism: The Unknown Future of Human Enhancement (2015), Many Yet One? Multiple Religious Belonging (2016), The Wiley Blackwell Companion to Religion and Ecology (2017), The Bloomsbury Handbook of Religion and Nature (2018), The Oxford Handbook of the Bible in Korea (2022), The T&T Clark Handbook to the Doctrine of Creation (2024), and New Confucian Horizons: Essays in Honor of Tu Weiming (2024).

These scholarly contributions culminate in Kim’s development of Theodao, a comprehensive theological framework that addresses pressing global issues through the integration of Christian theology and East Asian wisdom traditions.

== Theodao (Theology of Dao 道) ==
Heup Young Kim's Theodao (Theology of Dao) represents an innovative integration of Christian theology and East Asian wisdom traditions, particularly Confucianism and Daoism, designed to address the complex challenges of the contemporary world, including the rapid advancements in science and technology. Theodao critiques the traditional logos-centered paradigm of Western theology (theo-logos), which prioritizes rationality, individualism, and intelligence, and advocates for a shift to a Dao)-centered paradigm focused on wisdom, virtue, and harmony. This alternative framework emphasizes ecological sustainability, interdependence, and a holistic understanding of humanity's place within the cosmos.

A cornerstone of Theodao is its response to the ethical and existential risks posed by transhumanism and artificial intelligence (AI). Kim’s concept of "techno-dao" seeks to integrate technological innovation with the wisdom and virtues of the Dao, fostering harmony and moral accountability rather than merely enhancing functionality or efficiency. Theodao also introduces the idea of "Virtuous AI," artificial intelligence that aligns with human and ecological values, addressing concerns about the rise of superintelligent systems and their implications for society.

Theodao also tackles the theological challenges posed by emerging AI religions, such as the worship of superintelligent beings, by proposing a macro-paradigm shift. This shift entails moving from an anthropocentric and exclusive humanism to an inclusive, cosmological perspective rooted in the Dao. By fostering dialogue among Christian theology, science, and East Asian wisdom traditions, Theodao offers a transformative and integrative vision for global theology, one that champions balance, sustainability, and spiritual depth amidst the pressures of technological singularity.

== Book Publications in English ==
This section lists works in English only. For in Korean, see 김흡영.

Authored Books – Research

- Pneumatodao and the Way of the Spirit: A Theology of Breath in the Anthropocene and AI Age (Routledge, forthcoming).
- Christodao: the Way of Jesus, Trinity, and Spirit in the Flow of Dao (Eugene, OR: Cascade Books, 2026).
- Theodao (Theology of Dao) II: Advancing K-Theology in the Anthropocene (Seoul: Dongyeon, 2025).
- A Theology of Dao (Maryknoll, NY: Orbis Books, 2017).
- Christ and the Tao (Hong Kong: Christian Conference of Asia, 2003; reprinted by Wipf & Stock, 2010).
- Wang Yang-ming and Karl Barth: A Confucian-Christian Dialogue (Lanham, MD: University Press of America, 1996).
- Sanctification and Self-cultivation: A Study of Karl Barth and Neo-Confucianism (Wang Yang-ming), Ph.D. dissertation, Graduate Theological Union, 1992.

Edited Books – Research

- Asian and Oceanic Christianities in Conversation: Exploring Theological Identities at Home and in Diaspora (Amsterdam: Rodopi, 2011), co-edited with Fumitaka Matsuoka and Anri Morimoto.

Book Chapters – Research

- "Advancing Humanity: Artificial Intelligence, Transhumanism, Confucianism, and Theo-Dao,” in New Confucian Horizons: Essays in Honor of Tu Weiming, eds. Young-chan Ro, Jonathan Keir, and Peter C. Phan (Lanham: Lexington Books, 2024), 231–250.
- “Creation and Dao,” in T&T Clark Handbook to the Doctrine of Creation, ed. Jason Goroncy (T&T Clark, 2024), 694–706.
- “Biblical Reading on a Theology of Dao,” in The Oxford Handbook of the Bible in Korea, ed. Won W. Lee (Oxford: Oxford University Press, 2022), 147–160.
- “Perfecting Humanity in Confucianism and Transhumanism,” in Religious Transhumanism and Its Critics, eds. Arvin Gouw, Brian Patrick Green, and Ted Peters (Lanham, MD: Lexington Books, 2022), 101–112.
- “Eco-Dao: An Ecological Theology of Dao,” in The Bloomsbury Handbook of Religion and Nature: The Elements, eds. Laura Hobgood and Whitney Bauman (London: Bloomsbury Academic, 2018), 99–108.
- "Theo-Dao: Integrating Ecological Consciousness in Daoism, Confucianism, and Christian Theology,” in The Wiley Blackwell Companion to Religion and Ecology, ed. John Hart (Oxford: Wiley Blackwell, 2017), 104–114.
- “Multiple Religious Belonging as Hospitality: A Korean Confucian-Christian Perspective,” in Many Yet One? Multiple Religious Belonging, eds. Peniel R. Raijkumar and Joseph P. Dayam (Geneva: World Council of Churches, 2016), 75–88.
- “Cyborg, Sage, and Saint: Transhumanism as Seen from an East Asian Theological Setting,” in Religion and Transhumanism: The Unknown Future of Human Enhancement, eds. Calvin Mercer and Tracy J. Trothen (Santa Barbara, CA: Praeger, 2014), 97–114.
- “The Word Made Flesh: Ryu Young-mo’s Christo-Dao: A Korean Perspective,” in Word and Spirit: Renewing Christology and Pneumatology in a Globalizing World, eds. Anselm K. Min and Christoph Schwöbel (Berlin: De Gruyter, 2014), 113–130.
- “The Tao in Confucianism and Taoism: The Trinity in East Asian Perspective,” in The Cambridge Companion to the Trinity, ed. Peter C. Phan (Cambridge: Cambridge University Press, 2011), 293–308.
- "An Asian Journey Seeking Christian Wholeness: Owing Up to Our Own Metaphors,” in Asian and Oceanic Christianities in Conversation: Exploring Theological Identities at Home and in Diaspora, eds. Heup Young Kim, Fumitaka Matsuoka, and Anri Morimoto (Amsterdam: Rodopi, 2011), 25–38.
- “Ancestor Veneration in Asia,” in The Cambridge Dictionary of Christianity, ed. Daniel Patte (Cambridge: Cambridge University Press, 2010), 32.
- “Daoism and Christianity in Neo-Confucian Korea,” in The Cambridge Dictionary of Christianity, ed. Daniel Patte (Cambridge: Cambridge University Press, 2010), 304.
- “Sanctity of Life: A Reflection on Human Embryonic Stem Cell Debates from an East Asian Perspective,” in Global Perspectives on Science & Spirituality, ed. Pranab Das (West Conshohocken, PA: Templeton Press, 2009), 107–124.
- “Toward a Christotao: Christ as the Theanthropocosmic Tao,” in The Chinese Face of Jesus Christ, vol. 3b, ed. Roman Malek (Sankt Augustin: Institut Monumenta Serica and China-Zentrum Sankt Augustin, 2007), 1457–1479.
- “Asian Christianity: Toward a Trilogue of Humility: Sciences, Theologies, and Asian Religions,” in Why the Science and Religion Dialogue Matters: Voices from the International Society for Science and Religion, eds. Fraser Watts and Kevin Dulton (Philadelphia, PA: Templeton Press, 2006), 121–133.
- “The Sciences and the Religions: Some Preliminary East Asian Reflections on Christian Theology of Nature,” in God’s Action in Nature’s World: Essays in Honor of Robert John Russell, eds. Ted Peters and Nathan Hallanger (Hampshire: Ashgate, 2006), 77–90.
- “Christianity’s View of Confucianism: An East Asian Theology of Religions,” in Religions View Religions: Explorations in Pursuit of Understanding, eds. Jerald D. Gort, Henry Jansen, and Hendrik M. Vroom (Amsterdam: Rodopi, 2006), 265–282.
- “Life, Ecology, and Theo-tao: Towards an Ecumenism of the Theanthropocosmic Tao,” in Windows into Ecumenism: Essays in Honor of Ahn Jae Woong (Hong Kong: Christian Conference of Asia, 2005), 140–156.
- “The Word Made Flesh: Ryu Young-mo’s Christotao: A Korean Perspective,” in One Gospel and Many Cultures: Case Studies and Reflections on Cross-Cultural Theology, eds. Mercy Amba Oduyoye and Hendrik M. Vroom (Amsterdam: Rodopi, 2003), 129–148.
- “Owning Up to One’s Own Metaphors: A Christian Journey in the Neo-Confucian Wilderness,” in Visioning New Life Together Among Asian Religions (Hong Kong: Christian Conference of Asia, 2002), 243–253.
- “Response to Peter Lee, ‘A Christian-Chinese View of Goodness, Beauty, and Holiness,’” in Christianity and Ecology: Seeking the Well-being of Earth and Humans, eds. Dieter T. Hessel and Rosemary R. Ruether (Cambridge, MA: Harvard University Press, 2000), 357–363.
- “The Central Issue of Community: An Example of Asian North American Theology on the Way,” co-authored with David Ng, in People on the Way: Asian North Americans Discovering Christ, Culture, and Community, ed. David Ng (Judson Press, 1996), 25–41.

== Journal Articles – Research ==
- "Theodaoian Epistemology in a Global Age of Decolonization,” Intercultural Theology / ZMiss (2/2024): 67-84.
- “Reviving Minjung Theology in the Technological Era: Kim Yong-bok’s Seontopian Zoesophia in Dialogue with Theo-Dao,” Madang: Journal of Contextual Theology 39 (2023): 139–163.
- “Artificial Intelligence, Transhumanism, and the Crisis of Theo-Logos: Toward Theo-Dao,” Madang: Journal of Contextual Theology 38 (2022): 103–127.
- “Dasŏk Yu Yŏng-Mo’s Korean Trans-Cosmic and Trans-Religious Spirituality: A Translation and Commentary on ‘Spiritual Hiking,’” Interreligious Relations 26 (2021): 1–11.
- “Introducing Dasŏk Yu Yŏng-Mo’s Korean Spiritual Disciplines and his Poem ‘Being a Christian,’” Interreligious Relations 25 (2021): 1–11.
- “Paul Tillich, Boston Confucianism, Theology of Religions: A Short Reflection for the Perspective of Theo-Dao,” North American Paul Tillich Society Bulletin 36:3, 4 (2020): 13–16.
- “Death and Immortality: Biological and East Asian Religious Reflections on Transhumanism,” Madang: Journal of Contextual Theology 28 (2017): 3–29.
- “Embracing and Embodying God’s Hospitality Today in Asia,” Madang: Journal of Contextual Theology 23 (2015): 87–110.
- “Life, Ecology, and Theo-Tao: Towards an Ecumenism of the Theanthropocosmic Tao,” Madang: Journal of Contextual Theology 11 (2009): 75–94.
- “Ryu Young-mo’s Understanding of Christ: A Christodao,” Proceedings of the XXII World Congress of Philosophy, Vol. 50 (2008): 341-349.
- “Sanctity of Life: Dignity or Respect? An East Asian Theological Reflection on hES Cell Debates,” Proceedings of the XXII World Congress of Philosophy 5 (2008): 33–39.
- “A Tao of Interreligious Dialogue in the Age of Globalization,” Political Theology 6:4 (2005), 487-499.
- “The Coming of Yin Christ: Jesus Christ as the Tao,” C.T.C. Bulletin 19:3 (2003): 61–78.
- “Owning up to One’s Own Metaphors: A Christian Journey in the Neo-Confucian Wilderness,” Third Millennium 4:1 (2001), 31-40.
- “Liang-chi and Humanitas Christi: An Encounter of Wang Yang-ming and Karl Barth,” Korea Journal of Systematic Theology 4 (2001): 130–188.
- “Toward a Christotao: Christ as the Theanthropocosmic Tao,” Studies in Interreligious Dialogue 10:1 (2000): 5–29.
- “A Tao of Asian Theology in the Twenty-First Century: From the Perspective of the Ugmch'i Phenomenon,” Asia Journal of Theology 13:2 (1999): 276–293.
- “Imago Dei and T’ien-ming: John Calvin and Yi T’oegye on Humanity,” Ching Feng 41:3-4 (1998): 275–308. Also published in Chinese as 儒耶對話新里程 by the Chinese University of Hong Kong (2001).
- “The Study of Confucianism as a Theological Task,” Korea Journal of Theology 1 (1995): 257–274.
- “Jen and Agape: Toward a Confucian Christology,” Asia Journal of Theology 8:2 (1994): 335–364.
- “Two Concrete-Universal Ways: Their Convergence and Divergence,” Ching Feng 35:1 (1992), 4-12.
- “How to be Human: Toward a Genuine Confucian-Christian Dialogue,” The CAAM Nexus 4 (1991): 15–33.

== International Conference Presentations ==
- “Integrating East Asian Wisdom in AI Ethics: A Theodaoian Critique on the ‘Encountering AI’ Document,” Social and Ethical Issues in AI from an East Asian Perspective, October 16, 2024, Hong Kong Baptist University, Hong Kong.
- “New Humanism at the Time of Artificial Intelligence: A Theodaoian Reflection,” International Conference: Human Freedom at the Test of AI and Neurosciences, September 4, 2024, LUMSA University, Rome, Italy.
- “Toward Post-Intelligence Theology: a Theo-daoian Proposal,” Seoul International Conference on Virtuous Artificial Intelligence, Graduate Theological Union Center for the Natural Sciences and Theology, July 12, 2023.
- “What the Church Owes the Future? Ecumenical Conversation (12) on Artificial Intelligence,” the 11th Assembly of the World Council of Churches, August 31 - September 8, 2022, Karlsruhe, Germany.
- “Cosmic Spirituality in an Age of Artificial Intelligence and Corona Virus: from a Theo-daoian Perspective,” Gyeongan Graduate University International Symposium, June 28, 2021, Andong, South Korea.
- “Perfecting Humanity in Confucianism and Transhumanism,” Confucianism in Dialogue with Cultures and Religions: a Conference in Honor of Professor Tu Weiming on his 80th Birthday, Feb. 27, 2020, Berkeley, USA.
- "Eco-Dao: an Ecological Theology of the Dao,” Graduate Theological Union Lecture Nov. 19, 2019, Berkeley, USA.
- “Christianity in an Age of Artificial Intelligence,” Im Colloquium Lecture, UCLA Center for Korean Studies, Oct. 23, 2019, Los Angeles, USA.
- “Eco-Dao: an Ecological Theology of the Dao,” World Christianity and Adams Mission Lecture, USA, Oct. 1, 2019, Westmont College, Santa Barbara.
- “A Spiritual Journey toward a Theology of Dao,” Public Lecture, Graduate Theological Union, Sept. 24, 2019, Berkeley, USA.
- “Artificial Intelligence and The Crisis of Theo-Logos,” DARE Global Forum, Council for World Mission, June 19-22, 2019, Taipei, Taiwan.
- “A Framework of Reflection and Analysis, Looking at the Artificial General Intelligence from the Standpoint of Maeum (Mind-and-Heart),” Keynote Lecture, 2nd GTGU Global Symposium, Sept. 3, 2018, Andong, South Korea.
- “Laudato si’ and Eco-Dao,” 2nd Christian-Taoist Dialogue Consultation, Pontifical Council for Interreligious Dialogue, Nov. 6, 2018, Singapore.
- “Why Confucian-Christian Dialogue in Korea?,” Keynote Lecture, the 1st Christian-Confucian Dialogue Consultation, World Council of Churches and Korea Forum for Science and Life, Oct 27, 2017, Seoul, South Korea.
- "Hospitality in the Midst of Plurality: A Theological Journey," World Christianity and Adams Mission Series Lecture, Nov. 2016, Westmont College, USA.
- "Hospitality amongst Plurality: a Theological Journey,” Madang, the 10th Assembly of the World Council of Churches, Oct. 31, 2013, Busan, South Korea.
- “Embracing and Embodying God’s Hospitality Today in Asia,” Keynote Lecture, the 7th Congress of Asian Theologians (CATS VII), July 2, 2012, Methodist Theological University, Seoul, South Korea.
- “A Dao of Interreligious Dialogue in an Age of Globalization and Science,” Keynote Lecture on International Conference for Theologians in China, Japan, and Korea, May 13, 2011, Fudan University Xu-Ricci Dialogue Institute, Shanghai, China.
- “Life, Ecology, and Theo-tao: Towards a Life Theology of Theanthropocosmic Tao,” Convocation Lecture, Sept. 23, 2009, Graduate Theological Union, Berkeley, USA.
- “Confucianism as Old Testaments: Confucian-Christian relation in the Thought of Dasŏk Yu Yŏng-mo,” American Academy of Religion, Nov. 2011, San Francisco, USA.
- “A Trialogue of Humility: A New Way of Christian Mission in Asia,” Westmont College Public Lecture, Oct. 19, 2009, Santa Barbara, USA.
- “Sanctity of Life: Dignity or Respect?--An East Asian Theological Reflection on hES Cell Debates,” XXII World Congress of Philosophy, Aug. 3, 2008, Seoul, South Korea.
- “Ryu Young-mo’s understanding of Christ: a Christodao,” XXII World Congress of Philosophy, Aug. 1, 2008, Seoul, South Korea.
- “Panel on Heup Young Kim’s Christ and the Tao,” American Academy of Religion, Nov. 19, 2006, Washington, DC, USA.
- “Christotao: an East Asian Theology,” Centre for Interdisciplinary Study of Monotheistic Religions, Doshisha University, May 8, 2007, Kyoto, Japan.
- “Science and Religion Dialogue from a Confucian-Christian Perspective: Ian Barbour’s Theology of Nature,” the 22nd International Congress of History of Science, July 29, 2005, Beijing, China.
- “Sanctity of Life: a Confucian-Christian Perspective,” the 19th Congress of International Association of the History of Religions, March 25, 2005, Tokyo, Japan.
- “A Tao of Interreligious Dialogue: From an East Asian Christian Perspective,” American Academy of Religion, Nov. 21, 2004, San Antonio, USA.
- “Jesus is the Rice! Jesus is the Flower! Jesus is the Tao! Envisioning Christ in a Korean and East Asian Way (Ryu Young-mo’s Christotao),” Graduate Theological Union, Jan. 15, 2004, Berkeley, USA.
- “Christianity’s View of Confucianism: An East Asian Theology of Religions,” Conference on Religions View Religions: Explorations in Pursuit of Understanding, Nov. 1, 2002, Guldenberg, Netherlands.
- “The Word made Flesh: Ryu Young-mo’s Christotao, A Korean Perspective,” Conference on Cross-Cultural Hermeneutics, Oct. 27, 2001, Woodschoten, Netherlands.
- “Astonishing Similarities in Radical Differences: John Calvin and Yi T’oegye,” American Academy of Religion, Nov. 21, 1999, Boston, USA.
- “Imago Dei and T’ien-ming: John Calvin and Yi T’oegye on Humanity,” the 4th International Confucian-Christian Dialogue, Dec. 21, 1998, Chinese University of Hong Kong, Hong Kong.
- “Response to Peter Lee, ‘A Christian-Chinese View of Goodness, Beauty, and Holiness,’” Christianity and Ecology Conference, Harvard University Center for the Study of World Religions, April 16-19, 1998, Cambridge, USA.
- “Toward a Christotao: Jesus as the Theanthropocosmic Tao,” the 2nd Congress of Asian Theologians, Aug.12, 1999, Bangalore, India.
- “Toward a Christotao: Jesus as the Theanthropocosmic Tao,” American Academy of Religion, Nov. 22, 1997, San Francisco, USA.
- “A Tao of Asian Theology in the 21st Century,” the 1st Congress of Asian Theologians, May 25 - June 1, 1997, Suwon, South Korea.
- “Yi Toegye’s Understanding of Nature and Ecological Theology,” Confucianism and Ecology Conference, Harvard University Center for the Study of World Religions, May 31, 1996, Cambridge, Massachusetts.
- “Liang-chih and Humanitas Christi: An Encounter of Karl Barth and Wang Yang-ming,” the 3rd International Confucian-Christian Dialogue, Aug. 25, 1994, Boston University, Boston, USA.
- “Jen and Agape: Toward a Confucian Christology,” American Academy of Religion, Nov. 1992, San Francisco, USA.
- “Two Concrete-Universal Ways: Their Convergence and Divergence,” the 2nd International Confucian-Christian Dialogue, July 6-11, 1991, Graduate Theological Union, Berkeley, USA.
- “How to be Human: Toward a Genuine Confucian-Christian Dialogue,” American Academy of Religion, Nov. 1990, New Orleans, USA.
