= Graduate Theological Union =

Group of private American theological schools

- Motto: "Abundant Pathways. Intersecting Perspectives. Transformative Impact."
- Type: Private
- Established: 1962; 64 years ago
- Religious affiliation: Ecumenical and Multireligious
- Academic affiliations: Association of Theological Schools in the United States and Canada
- Endowment: $48.7 million (2020)
- Chairman: William Glenn
- President: Uriah Y. Kim
- Dean: Christopher Ocker
- Academic staff: 8
- Students: 245
- Location: Berkeley, California, U.S. 37.875524°N 122.262079°W
- Website: www.gtu.edu

The Graduate Theological Union (GTU) is a consortium of eight private independent American theological schools and eleven centers and affiliates. All the GTU members are located in Berkeley, California.

Founded in 1962, GTU and its member schools offers masters and doctoral degree programs in philosophy, theology and other subjects. Certificate programs are also available. GTU students are also able to take courses at the University of California, Berkeley (UCB).

Although it was founded by several Protestant schools, the GTU now has two Catholic schools as members and has academic centers for Judaism, Islam, Hinduism and other eastern religions.

== GTU members ==
The following schools and institutions are members of GTU

- Berkeley School of Theology (BST) – Berkeley, founded in 1871, affiliated with American Baptist Churches USA
- Church Divinity School of the Pacific (CDSP) – Founded in 1911, affiliated with Episcopal Church (United States), leaving GTU in January 2026
- Dominican School of Philosophy and Theology (DSTP) – Berkeley, founded in 1851, affiliated with the Western Province of the Dominican Order of the Roman Catholic Church
- Institute of Buddhist Studies – Berkeley, founded in 1949, affiliated with the Buddhist Churches of America
- Jesuit School of Theology of Santa Clara University – Berkeley, founded in 1934, affiliated with Society of Jesus of the Roman Catholic Church, part of Santa Clara University
- Pacific Lutheran Theological Seminary (PLTS) – Berkeley, founded in 1950, (ELCA) affiliated with the Evangelical Lutheran Church in America (ELCA) and part of California Lutheran University
- Pacific School of Religion (PSR) – Berkeley, founded in 1866, affiliated with several Protestant denominations
- San Francisco Theological Seminary (SFTS) – Berkeley, affiliated with Presbyterian Church (USA) and the University of Redlands

== History ==
During the late 19th century and early 20th century, several Christian denominations opened seminaries in Northern California to prepare ministers and priests to serve the rapidly expanding population in the region. These were all independent institutions. After the establishment of the University of California Berkeley (UCB) in 1868, several of these seminaries relocated near the university. They formed cooperative agreements with UCB to provide more educational choices for their students.

In the mid 20th century, the ecumenical movement prompted discussions among the seminaries affiliated with Berkeley to begin sharing resources. They decided to establish a cooperative graduate study program that would lead students to a master's degree in theology.

In 1962, six Protestant seminaries established the Graduate Theological Union (GTU) in Berkeley. They included the Berkeley Baptist Divinity School (now BST), CDSP, PLTS, SFTS and the Golden Gate Southern Baptist Theological Seminary.

The GTU expanded in 1964 with the addition of PSR, St. Albert's College (now DSTP) and the Starr King School for the Ministry. GTU began its first effort to share facilities with the creation of the Bibliographical Center to consolidate library administration and manage the different library collections. In 1966, Alma College relocated to Berkeley and was renamed the Jesuit School of Theology at Berkeley, which also joined the GTU. The Franciscan School of Theology (FST) joined GTU in 1968. That same year, GTU opened the Center for Judaic Studies (CJS) to promote exchanges between Christian and Jewish scholars. This was its first expansion into non-Christian faiths.During the 1960's, GTU expanded its graduate degree offerings, establishing Doctor of Philosophy and Master of Arts degrees. Members provided Master of Divinity, Master of Theological Studies, and Doctor of Ministry degrees.

In 1969, GTU established its Common Library in the basement of the Church Divinity School of the Pacific, merging all the member libraries into one location.By 1971, the GTU was fully accredited by the Association of Theological Schools. In 1979, GTU began construction the first phase of construction of a new building to house the GTU Common Library. Phase I was completed in 1981. Volunteers and staff moved 300,000 books into the partially completed building.

GTU in 1985 began the long-planned phase II of the new library building. It was completed in 1987 and named the Flora Lamson Hewlett Library in honor of the Hewlett Foundation. In 2007, GTU opened the Center for Islamic Studies (CIS) to allow students and scholars exposure to Islamic traditions

In 2013, the FST merged with the University of San Diego, leaving GTU to relocate to Oceanside, California. The Starr King School left the GTU in 2020. According to its administrators, few of its students were taking GTU courses and the school believed that the annual GTU fee of $310,000 was excessive.

== Administration ==
=== Presidents ===
- John Dillenberger (1967 – 1971)
- Claude Welch (1971 – 1982)
- Michael Blecker (1982 – 1987)
- Robert Barr (1987 – 1992)
- Glenn R. Bucher (1992 – 1999)
- James Donahue (2000 – 2012)
- Riess Potterveld (2013 – 2018)
- Daniel Lehmann (2018 – 2020)
- Uriah Kim (2020 – present)

==== Academic deans ====
The dean of the GTU is the chief academic officer for the GTU. The dean also chairs the council of deans, which is composed of the academic deans of the member schools. Traditionally, deans have held the John Dillenberger Professorship in their general field of specialization. For example, Margaret Miles held the professorship in historical theology while Arthur Holder held it in Christian spirituality. The current GTU president, Uriah Y. Kim, is the John Dillenberger Professor of Biblical Studies.

- Sherman E. Johnson (1962 – 1963)
- John Dillenberger (1963 – 1971)
- Claude Welch (1971 – 1987)
- Judith Berling (1987 – 1996; interim, 2016)
- Margaret Miles (1996 – 2001)
- Arthur Holder (2001 – 2016)
- Uriah Y. Kim (2017 – 2020)
- Elizabeth S. Pena (interim, 2020 – 2022)
- Jennifer Davidson (2022 – 2024)
- Christopher Ocker (2024 – present)

== Organizations ==
=== Academic centers ===
- Center for the Arts and Religion (CARe)
- Center for Islamic Studies (CIS)
- Center for Theology and the Natural Sciences (CTNS)
- Mira & Ajay Shingal Center for Dharma Studies (CDS)
- Richard S. Dinner Center for Jewish Studies (formerly the Center for Jewish Studies) (CJS)

=== Affiliates ===
- Center for Swedenborgian Studies (CSS)
- New College Berkeley (NCB)
- Patriarch Athenagoras Orthodox Institute (PAOI)
- Newbigin House of Studies (now Center for Church Innovation)
- Wilmette Institute
- China Academic Consortium (CAC)

== Academics ==
The GTU offers the Doctor of Philosophy (Ph.D.) degree and the Master of Arts (MA) degree in cooperation with its member seminaries. GTU consortial seminaries variously offer Th.M., M.Div., Doctor of Ministry (D.Min.), S.T.B., S.T.L., and S.T.D. degrees. The GTU also offers non-degree certificates in Interreligious Chaplaincy and Interreligious Studies. Doctoral students are encouraged not only to take advantage of the academic resources available to them at UCB but are also required to include a non-GTU scholar in their exams or dissertation committees. GTU students have collaborated with UCB faculty members in the anthropology, critical theory, ethnic studies, history, philosophy and sociology departments.

All matriculating students at GTU may take any UCB classes. They also have borrowing privileges at the UCB and Stanford University libraries. Only doctoral students have unrestricted access to registering for UCB classes (subject to approval of course instructors). Cross-registration opportunities are also available at the Dominican University of California in San Rafael, California, Holy Names University in Oakland, California., and Mills College in Oakland. Additionally, students can participate in international exchange programs.

=== Doctoral departments ===
The GTU has four doctoral departments, with more than 30 concentrations:

- Sacred Texts and Interpretation Department – focuses on the Hebrew Bible, the New Testament, the Rabbinic Literature, and studies in the sacred texts of the Islamic and Hindu traditions.
- Historical and Cultural Studies of Religions Department – encompasses studies in history of religions, art and religion, interreligious studies, and sociology of religion.
- Theology and Ethics Department – focuses on theological and ethical reflections in the Christian, Jewish, Islamic, and Hindu traditions. Other concentrations include comparative theology/ethics, philosophical theology, theology and science, and aesthetics.
- Religion and Practice Department – concentrates on homiletics, liturgical studies, missiology, practical theology, and religious education. The GTU also offers certificates in specialized studies.

=== Berkeley Journal of Religion and Theology ===
The GTU's in-house academic journal is the Berkeley Journal of Religion and Theology. The journal is managed by current doctoral students, although peer-reviewers include members of the consortial doctoral faculty. All issues are available free online.

== Campus ==
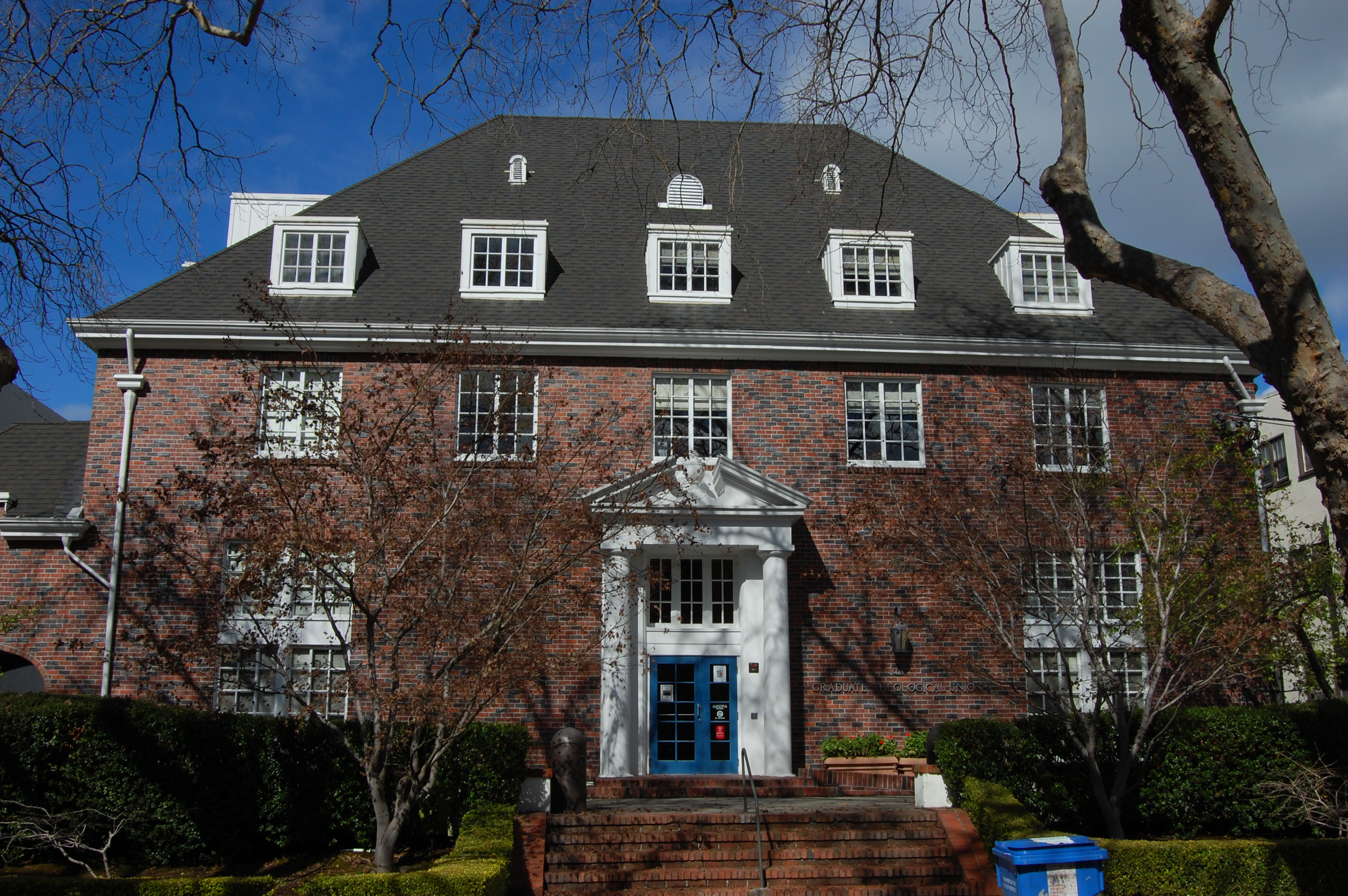
Le Conte Building, Graduate Theological Union (2011)

Although the GTU consortium occupies many buildings throughout the Bay Area, GTU owns only three buildings. One of them is the Flora Lamson Hewlett Library, one of the largest theological libraries in the world, with around 529,000 volumes.

Most of the GTU consortial schools are located in the Berkeley area with the majority north of the campus in a neighborhood known as "Holy Hill" due to the cluster of GTU seminaries and centers located there

== Notable alumni ==
- David Batstone – professor of business ethics at the University of San Francisco
- Virginia Burrus – the Bishop W. Earl Ledden Professor of Religion and the director of graduate studies at Syracuse University
- James Donahue – former president of Saint Mary's College of California and former president of GTU
- Eileen Chamberlain Donahoe – the former U.S. ambassador to the United Nations Human Rights Council
- Kristin Johnston Largen – president of the Wartburg Theological Seminary
- Heup Young Kim – president of the Korea Forum for Science and Life and the Korean Society of Systematic Theology, and honorary professor of theology at Kangnam University
- David Kundtz – self-help author and psychotherapist, author of Stopping: How to Be Still When You Have to Keep Going (1998)
- Nancey Murphy – professor of Christian philosophy at the Fuller Theological Seminary
- Douglas E. Oakman – professor of New Testament at Pacific Lutheran University
- Mark L. Poorman – former president of the University of Portland
- Gregory Sterling – dean of the Yale Divinity School and the Reverend Henry L. Slack Dean and Lillian Claus Professor of New Testament at Yale University
- George "Tink" Tinker – the Clifford Baldridge Professor Emeritus of American Indian Cultures and Religious Traditions at the Iliff School of Theology
- Shibley Telhami – the Anwar Sadat Professor for Peace and Development at the University of Maryland
- Wesley Wildman – professor of philosophy, theology, and ethics and founding member of the faculty of computing and data sciences at Boston University
- Hamza Yusuf – co-founder of Zaytuna College and advisor to the GTU Center for Islamic Studies
- Laurie Zoloth – the Margaret E. Burton Professor at the University of Chicago Divinity School and former president of the American Academy of Religion

== Faculty ==
The GTU draws its consortial faculty from its constituent seminaries and centers. Although faculty members are employed at their respective seminaries and centers, they commit to supervising doctoral and masters students, as well as occasionally teaching advanced GTU-wide courses.

=== Notable current faculty ===
- Christopher Ocker, dean and vice president of academic affairs, John Dillenberger Professor of the History of Christianity
- Ted Peters, distinguished research professor of systematic theology at Pacific Lutheran Theological Seminary and affiliate professor at the CTNS.
- Robert John Russell, the Ian Barbour Professor of Theology and Science and CTNS director .

=== Notable former faculty ===
Former faculty members include Naomi Seidman, Daniel C. Matt, David Alexander, John Dillenberger, and Roy I. Sano.
