= Okker =

Okker is a Dutch surname. Notable people with the surname include:

- Patricia Okker
- Simon Okker (1881–1944), Dutch épée fencer
- Tom Okker (born 1944), Dutch professional tennis player

== See also ==
- Ocker (surname)
