= Ocker (disambiguation) =

Ocker may refer to:

- ocker, a word used to refer to Australian people
- Ocker (surname)
- Ocker Hill, Tipton, England
