= Ockers =

Ockers is a surname. The surname Ockers was first found in Castle, South or West Acre in Norfolk, recorded in the Domesday Book of 1086 as Acre. We must look to Sussex to find the first record of the family, for it is there that William del Acr was listed in the Curia Regis Rolls for 1214. Later, London records show Adam de Acres in 1346.

Notable people with the surname include:

- Stan Ockers (1920–1956), Belgian cyclist
- Weyn Ockers (died 1568), Dutch Protestant iconoclastic

== See also ==
- Ocker (surname)
