= Jennifer Barry =

Professor of religious studies

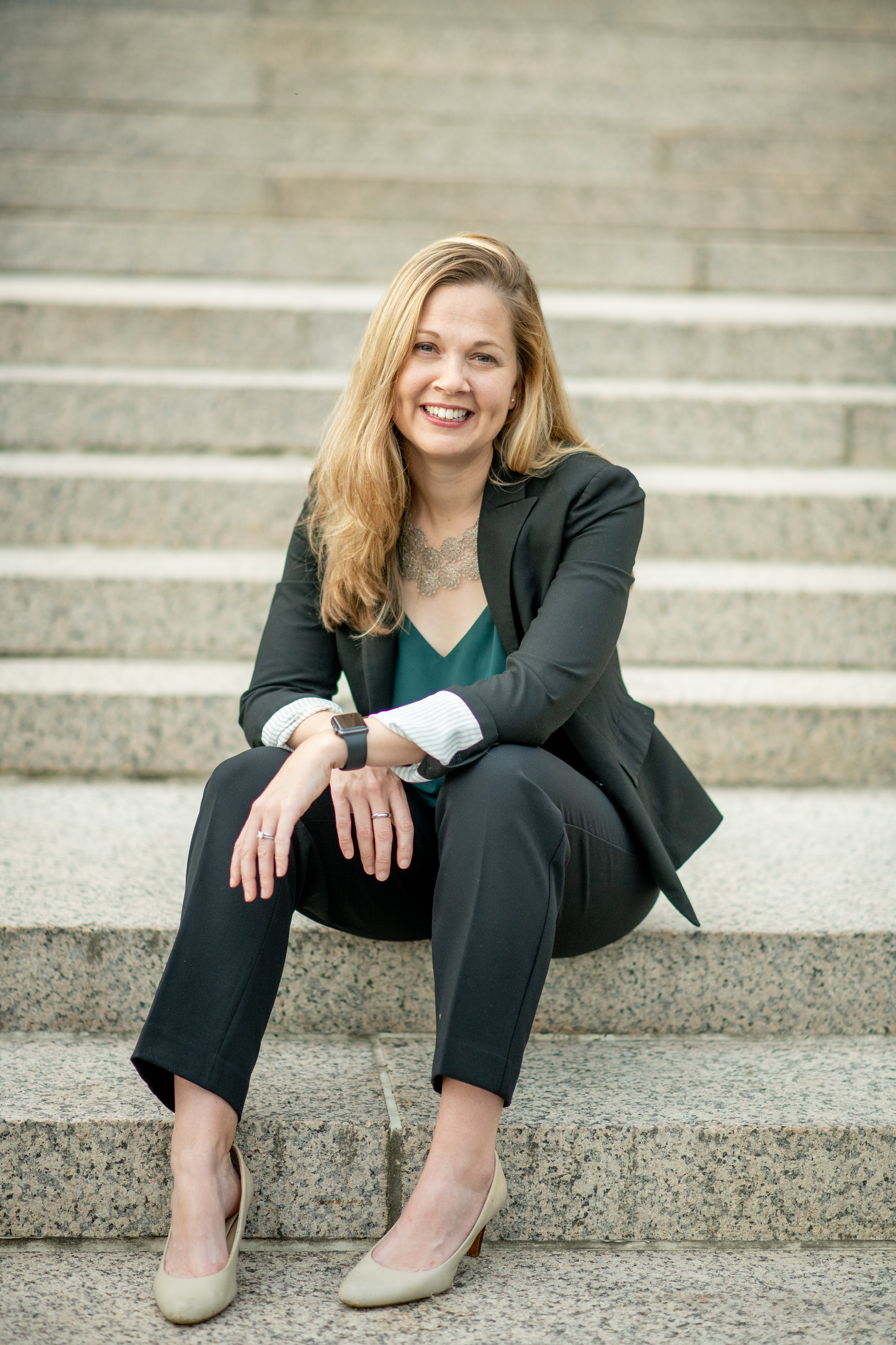
Prof. Jenny Barry

Jennifer Barry is Associate Professor of Religious Studies in the Department of Classics, Philosophy, and Religion at the University of Mary Washington. She is an expert on late ancient studies, early Christianity, later Roman antiquity, and gender studies.

== Education ==
Barry received her PhD from Drew University in 2013. Her doctoral supervisor was Virginia Burrus. She was awarded a Masters in Theological Studies from Duke Divinity School in 2006.

== Career ==
Barry's research has been described as "noteworthy" and "stimulating". She received the 2024 National Endowment for the Humanities Summer Award. In 2022 she was awarded a Shohet Scholarship from The International Catacomb Society. She was a Loeb Classical Library Fellow, Harvard University (2023–2024) and was recently awarded a Waple Faculty Award for Professional Achievement (2025-2026).

== Bibliography ==
- Gender Violence in Late Antiquity: Male Fantasies and the Christian Imagination Berkeley, University of California Press, 2025
- Bishops in Flight: Exile and Displacement in Late Antiquity, Berkeley, University of California Press, April 2019.
- "Remembering Shadow Councils: Athanasius of Alexandria and the problem of Tyre" in From Ctesiphon to Toledo Edited by Volker Menze Annales Historiae Conciliorum 53.1 (Aschendorff Verlag, 2024), 35-48
- "Cosmos/Cosmology" in: Brill Encyclopedia of Early Christianity: Authors, Texts, Ideas, General Editor David G. Hunter, Paul J.J. van Geest, Bert Jan Lietaert Peerbolte (Brill Academic Press, 2024)
- "Athanasius Pulled Apart: Heresiology and the (dis)membered (fe)male body" Harvard Theological Review 116.4 (2023): 514-532
- "A Bad Romance: Late Ancient Fantasy, Violence, and Christian Hagiography" Journal of Late Antiquity 16.1 (2023): 54-73.
- "We Didn't Start the Fire - The Alexandrian Legacy Within Orthodox Memory", Journal of Orthodox Studies 3.1 (2020): 13-30
- "So Easy to Forget: Augustine's Treatment of the Sexually Violated in the City of God", Journal of the American Academy of Religion, 88.1 (2020), 235-253
- "Canaan" in: Brill Encyclopedia of Early Christianity: Authors, Texts, Ideas, General Editor David G. Hunter, Paul J.J. van Geest, Bert Jan Lietaert Peerbolte (Brill Academic Press, 2024; online version 2020)
- "Damning Nicomedia - The Spatial Consequences of Exile", Studies in Late Antiquity, 3.3 (Fall 2019): 413-435
- "Heroic Bishops - Hilary of Poitiers's exilic discourse", Vigiliae Christianae, vol. 70 (Fall 2016): 1-20
- "Diagnosing heresy in Ps. - Martyrius's Funerary Speech in Praise of the Holy John Chrysostom", Journal of Early Christian Studies, vol. 24.3 (Fall 2016)
- "Apostolic Fathers" in: BibleOdyssey
