= Naomi Seidman =

American religious scholar

- Occupations: Jackman Humanities Professor, University of Toronto

Academic background
- Education: University of California, Berkeley, University of California, Davis, Brooklyn College
- Doctoral advisor: Chana Kronfeld
- Other advisors: Robert Alter, Bluma Goldstein

Academic work
- Discipline: Jewish studies, Comparative literature
- Sub-discipline: Yiddish literature, Yiddish and Hebrew literature in translation, Haskalah
- Institutions: University of Toronto, Graduate Theological Union

Naomi Seidman is Chancellor Jackman Professor in the Arts at the University of Toronto, and was previously Koret Professor of Jewish Culture and the Director of the Richard S. Dinner Center for Jewish Studies at the Graduate Theological Union in Berkeley. In 2016, she received a Guggenheim Fellowship. In 2019, she won a National Jewish Book Award.

== Biography ==
Seidman comes from an Orthodox, Yiddish-speaking rabbinic family, and was a daughter of Hassidic Jewish writer Dr. Hillel Seidman, author of Diary of the Warsaw Ghetto, and Sara Abraham Seidman. Her parents met in the displaced persons camp in Föhrenwald, where he was working for Agudah and she was teaching.

She was raised in Boro Park, Brooklyn and attended Bais Yaakov schools; she left Orthodoxy at 18, on the verge of an arranged marriage.

She received a B.A. from Brooklyn College in 1981, a M.A. from UC Davis in 1984, and a Ph.D. at UC Berkeley in 1993.

Her writings focus on the relationship between Judaism, literature, gender studies, translation studies, and sexuality. She has written extensively on Yiddish literature, translation, and the Haskalah. She is a leading scholar of the Bais Yaakov movement and the work and life of Sarah Schenirer. In 2022, she hosted "Heretic in the House," a limited-series podcast from the Shalom Hartman Institute about leaving Orthodox Judaism. In 2024, she published Translating the Jewish Freud: Psychoanalysis in Hebrew and Yiddish.

== Selected works ==
- Seidman, Naomi (1996), "Elie Wiesel and the scandal of Jewish rage", Jewish Social Studies, 3 (1): 1–19, JSTOR 4467484.
- Seidman, Naomi (1997), A marriage made in heaven: The sexual politics of Hebrew and Yiddish, Contraversions: Critical Studies in Jewish Literature, Culture, and Society, vol. 7, University of California Press.
- Seidman, Naomi (2006), Faithful renderings: Jewish-Christian difference and the politics of translation, University of Chicago Press.
- Seidman, Naomi (2016), The Marriage Plot, Or, How Jews Fell in Love with Love, and with Literature, Stanford University Press.
- Seidman, Naomi (2019), Sarah Schenirer and the Bais Yaakov Movement: A Revolution in the Name of Tradition, Littman.
- Seidman, Naomi (2024), Translating the Jewish Freud: Psychoanalysis in Hebrew and Yiddish, Stanford University Press.
