= Dominican School of Philosophy and Theology =

Catholic seminary in Berkeley, California

Coordinates: 37°52′51.35″N 122°15′52.47″W

- College of Saint Albert the Great
- Latin: Collegium Sancti Alberti Magni
- Motto: Deus providebit (God will provide')
- Type: Graduate school
- Established: 1851; 175 years ago
- Religious affiliation: Catholic (Dominican Order)
- Academic affiliations: Graduate Theological Union, University of California Berkeley
- President: Reverend Albert Duggan
- Dean: Brother Paschal Strader
- Location: Berkeley, California, United States
- Website: www.dspt.edu

The Dominican School of Philosophy and Theology (DSPT) is a Catholic graduate school in Berkeley, California, United States. It is a member of the interfaith Graduate Theological Union (GTU) and an affiliate of the University of California Berkeley (UCB). DSPT is sponsored by the Dominican Order.

DSPT offers certificate and degree programs to women and men of all religions as well as training for the Dominicans of the Western Province. DSPT is the only graduate level theological institution in the United States to offer a concurrent degree, two master's degrees with one thesis in philosophy and theology.

== History ==
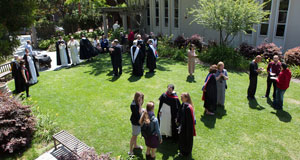
DSPT campus, Berkeley, California (2014)

The history of the Dominican Order in California, along with that of DSTP, goes back to the erection of the Diocese of Monterey in 1850 by Pope Pius IX. The California Gold Rush, starting in 1848, had rapidly increased the population of the state. However, the exodus of Mexican clergy after the end of the Mexican-American War had shattered the Catholic infrastructure there.

The pope named Reverend Joseph Alemany, a Dominican priest, as the first bishop of Monterey, the first new diocese in California. The Dominican Order also gave Alemany the responsibility of establishing the Western Dominican Province in the Western United States. Before Alemany left Italy for Monterey, California, the Dominicans tasked Reverend Francis Sadoc Vilarrasa to accompany Alemany and open a house of studies, or seminary in Monterey. After a long journey, Alemany and Vilarrasa arrived in 1851 in Monterey. Vilarrasa was accompanied by five Dominican seminarians, the first students in the new house of studies.

After two years, the Bay Area of Northern California had quickly outstripped Monterey in population and economic growth. In 1853, Pius IX erected the Archdiocese of San Francisco and appointed Alemany as its first archbishop. A year later, Vilarrassa moved the seminary to Benicia, California, a town near San Francisco. Alemany donated a plot of land for construction of the new seminary.

In 1931, the master of the Dominican Order told the administrators of the Benicia house of studies that they needed to relocate closer to USB to benefit its students. In 1932, the school moved to Oakland, California, and renamed itself as the College of St. Albert the Great.

St. Albert in 1964 joined the Graduate Theological Union (GTU), a consortium of theological schools of different Christian denominations and other religions, most of them located near UCB.That same year, St. Albert received accreditation from the Western Association of Schools and Colleges (WASC).

St. Albert moved from Oakland in 1976 to a leased facility close to the other GTU schools in Berkeley. The Oakland facility became St. Albert's Priory. St. Albert in 1978 changed its name to the Dominican School of Philosophy and Theology. In 2004, DSPT purchased a permanent campus site in the North Berkeley near other GTU schools; it opened in 2006. DSPT in 2011 announced the creation of a course on the Traditional Dominican Rite, which was in common use before the liturgical changes of the Second Vatican Council.

In 2021, DSPT announced a new scholarship program for individuals enrolling in the graduate courses. Reverend Albert Duggan was named president of DSPT in 2025.

== Academics ==
=== Graduate programs ===
- Master of Philosophy (MA) – a two-year program that concentrates on the study of Aristotle and Thomas Aquinas
- Master of Theology (MA) – a two-year program that applies Catholic tradition to contemporary theological concerns
- Master of Divinity (MDiv) – a program that follows the requirements in the Dominican Formation Documents for Student Friars and with the general requirements of the Program of Priestly Formation (PPF) of the US Conference of Catholic Bishops.

=== Certificate programs ===
- Certificate of Philosophical Studies – a non-degree program on Western philosophical tradition
- Certificate of Theological Studies (CTS) – a non-degree program on the Catholic theological tradition

=== Other programs ===
- Special Student – a program offering coursework for continuing education and sabbatical studies
- PHILOI International – a program of formation at DSPT for Dominican brothers in other provinces

=== Accreditation ===
DSPT is chartered by the State of California. It is accredited by WASC and by the Association of Theological Schools (ATS). DSPT is established by the Dominican Order as a center of studies for the Order.

== DSPT College of Fellows ==
The College of Fellows are individuals who gather every year on campus to discuss politics, government, law, economics, business, the sciences, bio-medical research, technology, media, and the arts. Members also participate in student events on campus throughout the academic year. The College of Fellows was formed in 2006 under the leadership of DSPT President Michael Sweeney,
