= Virginia Burrus =

American professor of religion

- Occupations: Scholar; author; professor
- Title: Bishop W. Earl Ledden Professor of Religion and Director of Graduate Studies

Academic background
- Education: Yale University (BA); University of Göttingen; Graduate Theological Union (MA, PhD)

Virginia Burrus is an American scholar of Late Antiquity and expert on gender, sexuality and religion. She is currently the Bishop W. Earl Ledden Professor of Religion and director of graduate studies at Syracuse University.

== Education ==
Originally from Texas, Burrus attended Yale University where she gained a BA in Classical Civilization in 1981, before studying theology at the University of Göttingen, Germany (1981–1982). She then went on to gain an master's degree in 1984 in the History of Christianity from the Graduate Theological Union in Berkeley, CA. Her dissertation was entitled Chastity as Autonomy: Women in the Stories of the Apocryphal Acts. She received her PhD in 1991 from the same institution. Her doctoral thesis was entitled The Making of a Heresy: Authority, Gender, and the Priscillianist Controversy. Her PhD was supervised by Rebecca Lyman, Professor Emerita of History at University of California, Berkeley.

== Career ==
Burrus was professor of early church history at Drew University from 1991 to 2013 (assistant professor, 1991–1996; associate professor, 1996–2003; chair of the Graduate Division of Religion, 2009–2013). On joining Syracuse University as the Bishop W. Earl Ledden Professor of Religion, Burrus was the third person to be appointed to the position and succeeded Patricia Cox Miller, professor emerita at Syracuse University. Burrus was appointed director of graduate studies at Syracuse University in 2016.

Burrus is a member of several academic societies, including the American Academy of Religion (1985–present) and the Society of Biblical Literature (1985–present), and has sat on steering committees for both associations. She has been elected as a member of the American Theological Society (2002), the American Society of the Study of Religion (2005) and the International Association of Patristic Studies (2010). From 2009 to 2010 she served as the president of the North American Patristics Association, of which she remains a member. Burrus has served as an associate editor for the Journal of Early Christian Studies (2008–2014), and is the founding co-editor of the University of Pennsylvania Press Series Divinations: Rereading Late Ancient Religion (2001–present).

Burrus specializes in the literary and cultural history of Christianity, and has a wide range of interests including gender, sexuality, orthodoxy and heresy, martyrdom, asceticism, hagiography and histories of theology within Late Antiquity. Burrus engages with a variety of theoretical discourses within her work, including feminism and post-colonialism, applying and critiquing the approaches of 20th century philosophers and theorists such as Baudrillard, Cixous, Foucault and Irigaray. Her 2004 publication The Sex Lives of the Saints has been translated into French, Italian and Czech. Her doctoral students include Jennifer Barry and Peter Mena.

In April 2021, Burrus was elected member of the American Academy of Arts and Sciences.

== Select bibliography ==
=== Books and edited volumes ===
- Czech translation: Sexuální životy svatých: Erotika středověké hagiografie, translated by Zuzana Gabajová. Prague: Academia, 2015
- The Life of Saint Helia: Critical Edition, Translation, Introduction, and Commentary. Early Christian Texts. Oxford: Oxford University Press, 2014. (Co-author with Marco Conti)
- French translation: La vie sexuelle des saints: L'art érotique de l'hagiographie ancienne, translated by Elsa Boyer. Montrouge: Bayard, 2011
- Italian translation: La vita erotica dei Santi, translated by Marta Albertella. Genova: Il Melangolo, 2011
- Seducing Augustine: Bodies, Desires, Confessions. NY: Fordham University Press, 2010. (Co-author with Mark Jordan and Karmen MacKendrick)
- Saving Shame: Martyrs, Saints, and Other Abject Subjects. Divinations: Rereading Late Ancient Religion. Philadelphia: University of Pennsylvania Press, 2008.
- Toward a Theology of Eros. NY: Fordham University Press, 2006. (co-editor with Catherine Keller)
- Late Ancient Christianity: A People's History of Christianity, Volume 2. Minneapolis: Fortress Press, 2005. (editor)
- The Sex Lives of Saints: An Erotics of Ancient Hagiography. Divinations: Rereading Late Ancient Religion. Philadelphia: University of Pennsylvania Press, 2004.
- "Begotten, Not Made": Conceiving Manhood in Late Antiquity. Figurae: Reading Medieval Culture. Stanford: Stanford University Press, 2000.
- The Making of a Heretic: Gender, Authority, and the Priscillianist Controversy. Transformation of the Classical Heritage. Berkeley: University of California Press, 1995.
- Chastity as Autonomy: Women in the Stories of Apocryphal Acts. Women in Religion. Lewiston & Queenston: The Edwin Mellen Press, 1987.

=== Articles and essays ===
- "Socrates, the Rabbis and the Virgin: The Dialogic Imagination in Late Antiquity". Charlotte Elisheva Fonrobert, Ishay Rosen-Zvi, Aharon Shemesh & Moulie Vidas (eds.) in collaboration with James Redfield, Talmudic Transgressions: Engaging the Work of Daniel Boyarin. Leiden: Brill (2017), 457-74
- "Torture, Truth, and the Witnessing Body: Reading Christian Martyrdom with Page duBois," in Torture, Truth, and Slavery: Engaging the Work of Page duBois, ed. by Albert Harrill, special issue of Biblical Interpretation: A Journal of Contemporary Issues, 25.1 (2017)
- With Marco Conti, "Between Fragment and Compilation: A Virgin’s Vision of the Afterlife," Sacris Erudiri 54 (2015) 201-224
- "'Nec sanabatur vulnus illud meum' (Conf. 6.15): Trauma, Time, and Voice in Augustine's Confessions," Trauma and Traumatization in Individual and Collective Dimensions: Insights from Biblical Studies and Beyond, ed. by Eve-Marie Becker, Jan Dochhorn, and Else Holt (Göttingen: Vandenhoeck & Ruprecht, 2014), 100-110
- "History, Theology, Orthodoxy, Polydoxy", Modern Theology 30 (2014) 7-16
- "Gender, Eros, and Pedagogy: Macrina's Pious Household", Ascetic Culture, edited by Blake Leyerle and Robin Darling Young, University of Notre Dame Press, 2013, 167-81
- "Seducing Theology", Theology and Sexuality 18:2 (2013)
- "Augustine, Rosenzweig, and the Possibility of Experiencing Miracle", Material Spirit, edited by Carl Good, Manuel Asensi, and Gregory Stallings. New York: Fordham University Press, 2013, 94-110
- "Nothing is Not One: Revisiting the ex nihilo." Modern Theology 29.2 (2013): 33-48
- "'Honor the Fathers": Exegesis and Authority in the Life of Saint Helia." Asceticism and Exegesis in Early Christianity: The Reception of New Testament Texts in Ancient Ascetic Discourses, edited by Hans-Ulrich Wiedemann. Göttingen, Germany: Vandenhoeck and Ruprecht, 2013, 445-57
- "'The Passover Still Takes Place Today': Exegesis, Asceticism, Judaism, and Origen's On Passover." Asceticism and Exegesis in Early Christianity: The Reception of New Testament Texts in Ancient Ascetic Discourses, edited by Hans-Ulrich Wiedemann. Göttingen, Germany: Vandenhoeck and Ruprecht, 2013, 235-45
- "Bodies, Desires, Confessions: Shame in Plotinus, Antony, and Augustine", Shame Between Penance and Punishment, edited by Bénédicte Sère and Jörg Wettlaufer. Florence: SISMEL-Edizioni del Galluzzo, 2013, 23-48
- "Augustine's Bible", Ideology, Culture, and Translation, edited by Scott Elliott and Roland Boer. Atlanta: Society of Biblical Literature, 2012, 69-82
- "Wyschogrod's Hand: Saints, Animality, and the Labor of Love", Philosophy Today (Winter 2011): 412-421
- "Seeing God in Bodies: Augustine, Rosenzweig, Wolfson", Reading Forwards and Backwards: Postmodern Readings of Ancient Christian Texts, edited by Scot Douglass and Morwenna Ludlow. London: T&T Clark, 2011, 44-59
- "2010 NAPS Presidential Address: 'Fleeing the Uxorious Kingdom': Augustine's Queer Theology of Marriage", Journal of Early Christian Studies 19 (2011): 1-20
- "A Saint of One's Own: Emmanuel Levinas, Eliezer ben Hyrcanus, and Eulalia of Mérida", L'Esprit Créateur 50 (2010): 6-20. Special issue on "Sanctity," edited by Cary Howie
- "Carnal Excess: Flesh at the Limits of Imagination", Journal of Early Christian Studies 17 (2009): 247-265
- "Queer Lives of Saints: Jerome's Hagiography", Journal of the History of Sexuality, vol. 10 (2001) 442-479
- "Words and Flesh: The Bodies and Sexuality of Ascetic Women in Christian Antiquity", Journal of Feminist Studies in Religion, vol. 10 (1994) 27-51
