= Uriah Y. Kim =

South Korean-born American Old Testament scholar

Uriah Kim
- Born: South Korea

Academic background
- Education: New York University (BA); Princeton Theological Seminary (MDiv); Emory University (MTh); Graduate Theological Union (PhD)

Academic work
- Discipline: Theology
- Sub-discipline: Biblical studies Old Testament

Uriah Y. Kim is a South Korean-born American Old Testament scholar working as president of the Graduate Theological Union and John Dillenberger Professor of Biblical Studies.

== Early life and education ==
Born into a Buddhist home in South Korea, Kim moved to the United States when he was ten years old and became a Christian as a teenager. He completed his Bachelor of Arts degree from New York University, Master of Divinity from Princeton Theological Seminary, Master of Theology from the Candler School of Theology, and PhD from the Graduate Theological Union in May 2004.

== Career ==
Kim taught Hebrew Bible at Hartford Seminary (2005–2016), where he became a full professor and served as academic dean.

Since January 2017, Kim has been core doctoral faculty and John Dillenberger Professor of Biblical Studies at the Graduate Theological Union. In August 2020, he was named ninth President of the Graduate Theological Union.

His research and teaching interests include Deuteronomistic History, History of Ancient Israel, Postcolonial Biblical Criticism, Asian-American Biblical Hermeneutics, King David, and the Book of Judges.

== Works ==
- Kim, Uriah Y. (2006). Decolonizing Josiah: Toward a Postcolonial Reading of the Deuteronomistic History. Sheffield Phoenix Press. ISBN 978-1-905048-72-4.
- Kim, Uriah Y. (2008). Identity and Loyalty in the David Story: A Postcolonial Reading. Sheffield Phoenix Press. ISBN 978-1-906055-58-5.
- Kim, Uriah Y. (2011) “Where is the Home for the Man of Luz?” Interpretation.
- Kim, Uriah Y. (2013) “The Politics of Othering in North America and in the Book of Judges,” Concilium.
- Kim, Uriah Y. (2014). Reading a Tendentious Bible: Essays in Honor of Robert B. Coote, Co-editor, Sheffield Phoenix Press. ISBN 978-1907534935.
- Kim, Uriah Y. (2014). “More to the Eye than Meets the Eye: A Protest against the Empire in Samson’s Death,” Biblical Interpretation.
- Kim, Uriah Y.; Yang, Seung Ai, eds. (2019). T&T Clark Handbook of Asian American Biblical Hermeneutics. Bloomsbury Publishing. ISBN 978-0-567-67261-2.
