= Claude Welch (theologian) =

American theologian (1922–2009)

Claude Raymond Welch (March 10, 1922, in Genoa City, Wisconsin – November 6, 2009, in Freeport, Illinois) was a historical theologian specializing in Karl Barth and nineteenth-century theology. He served as President (1971–1982) and academic dean (1971–1987) of the Graduate Theological Union in California.

== Publications ==
- Protestant Thought in the Nineteenth Century, 2 vols. (Yale, 1972, 1985)
- "Nineteenth Century: An Overview," in Oxford Companion to Christian Thought (Oxford, 2000)
- (with John Dillenberger) Protestant Christianity, Interpreted Through Its Development, 2nd edition (Macmillan, 1988)
- The Reality of the Church (Scribners, 1958)
- Graduate Education in Religion: A Critical Appraisal (Montana, 1971)
- In This Name: The Doctrine of the Trinity in Contemporary Theology (Scribners, 1952)
