= Ocker (surname) =

Ocker is a surname. Notable people with the surname include:

- Christopher Ocker (fl. 2002), American historian
- Sheldon Ocker (born 1942), American sportswriter
- William C. Ocker (1880–1942), American aviator

== See also ==
- Ockers
