= Christopher Ocker =

Christopher Ocker is Dean, Vice President for Academic Affairs, and John Dillenberger Professor of the History of Christiantiy in the Graduate Theological Union at Berkeley, California. He was the inaugural director of the Medieval and Early Modern Studies Program in the Institute for Religion and Critical Inquiry in the Australian Catholic University, Melbourne, from 2019-2021, and he remains an Honorary Professor of that University. He has been professor of the history of Christianity at San Francisco Theological Seminary and a member of the Core Doctoral Faculty of the Graduate Theological Union in Berkeley. He is currently series editor of Studies in Medieval and Reformation Traditions, a co-editor of Arbeiten zur Kirchengeschichte, and an editor of the Journal of the Bible and Its Reception. He served as Interim Dean of SFTS and Assistant Provost of the Graduate School of Theology in the University of Redlands from 2021 to 2023. Ocker is known for his work on the history of religion in Europe, Medieval and early modern intellectual and cultural history, and the social and political history of late medieval and early modern Central Europe.

== Selected publications ==
- The Hybrid Reformation: A Social, Cultural, and Intellectual History of Contending Forces. New York: Cambridge University Press, 2022.
- Luther, Conflict, and Christendom: Reformation Europe and Christianity in the West, New York: Cambridge University Press, 2018.
- Church-Robbers and Reformers in Germany, 1525–1547, Leiden: E.J. Brill, 2006.
- Biblical Poetics before Humanism and Reformation, Cambridge University Press, 2002.
- "Anti-Judaism and Anti-Semitism,” in Oxford Encyclopedia of Martin Luther, eds. Derek Nelson, Paul Hinlicky, New York: Oxford University Press, 2017.
- "Explaining Evil and Grace," in Oxford Handbook of the Reformation, ed. Ulinka Rublack, Oxford: Oxford University Press, 2016.
- with Kevin Madigan, “After Beryl Smalley: Thirty Years of Medieval Exegesis, 1984-2013,” Journal of the Bible and Its Reception, 2(2015):87-130.
- "The German Reformation and Medieval Thought and Culture," History Compass 10(2012):13-46 (http://onlinelibrary.wiley.com/doi/10.1111/j.1478-0542.2011.00816.x/abstract)
- "German Theologians and the Jews in the Fifteenth Century,” in Jews, Judaism and the Reformation in Sixteenth-Century Germany, eds. Dean Phillip Bell and Stephen G. Burnett, Leiden: E.J. Brill, 2006.
- "Armut und die menschliche Natur," Die neue Frömmigkeit: eine europäische Kultur am Ende des Mittelalters. Edited by Martial Staub and Marek Derwich, for the series Veröffentlichungen des Max-Planck-Instituts für Geschichte. Göttingen: Vandenoeck und Ruprecht, 2004.
- "Contempt for Jews and Contempt for Friars in Late Medieval Germany," Friars and Jews in the Middle Ages and Renaissance, eds. Steven McMichael and Susan E. Myers, Leiden: E.J. Brill, 2004.
- "Religious Reform and Social Cohesion," The Work of Heiko A. Oberman, eds. Thomas A. Brady and James Tracy, Leiden: E.J. Brill, 2002.
