= Kangnam University =

Coordinates: 37°16′33″N 127°07′59″E

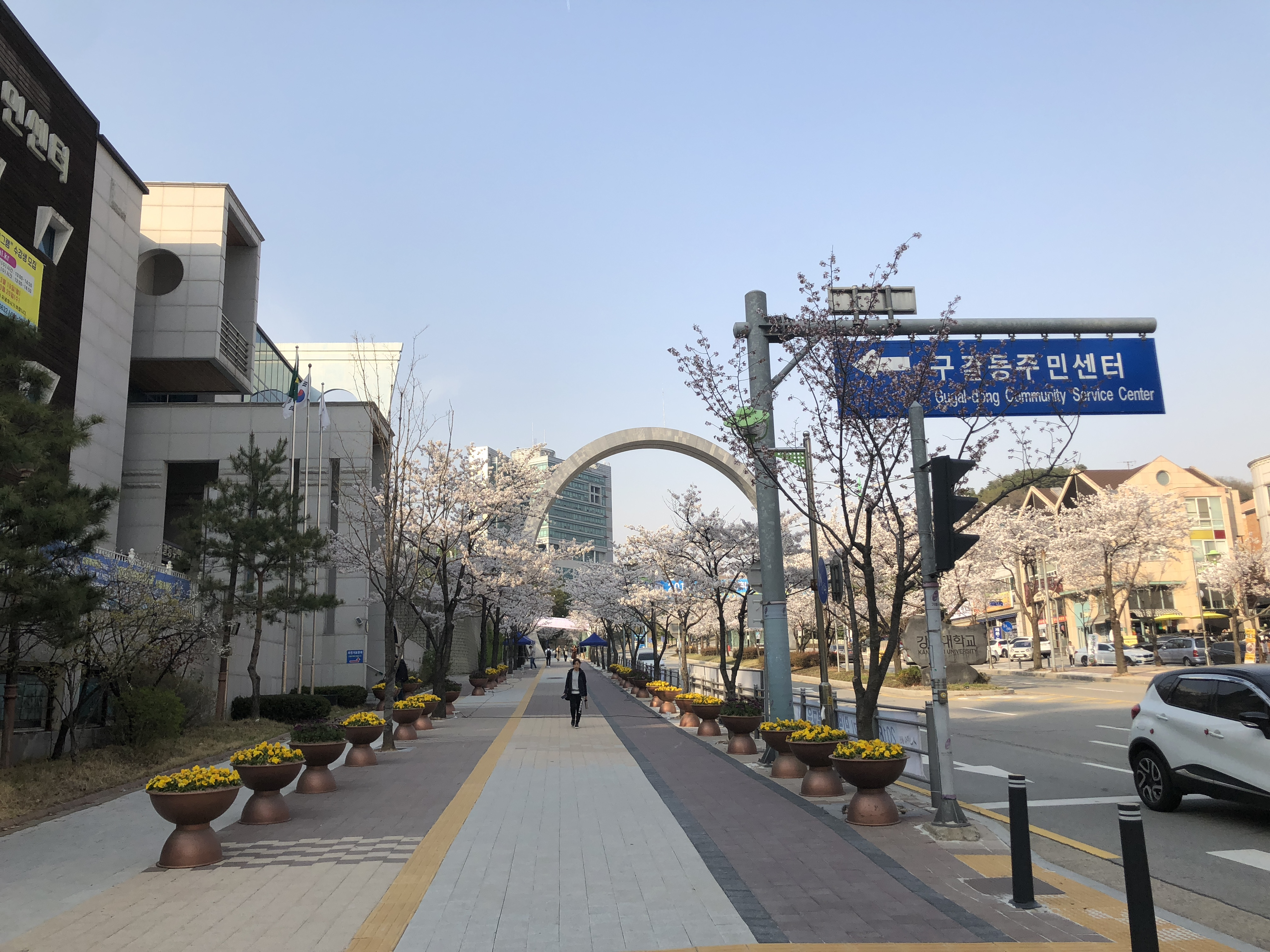
- Motto: Worship of God and Love for One's neighbors
- Type: Private
- Established: 1946
- President: Yun Shin-il
- Undergraduates: 5,964 (as of 2024)
- Postgraduates: 382 (as of 2023)
- Location: Yongin, Gyeonggi-do, South Korea
- Campus: Urban
- Colors: blue
- Mascot: white sheep
- Website: https://www.kangnam.ac.kr

- Kangnam University
- Hangul: 강남대학교
- Hanja: 江南大學校
- RR: Gangnam daehakgyo
- MR: Kangnam taehakkyo

Kangnam University (Korean: 강남대학교) is a private university in Yongin, South Korea.

Founded July 1, 1946 by Reverend Yi Ho-bin as the Choong-ang Theology Institute, the school initially met at a lecture hall in the local YMCA in Seoul, South Korea. The university holds the spirit of Gyeongcheonanein, which means 'to worship the heavens and love mankind'. The institution eventually moved in 1967 to Jangsa-dong in Seoul and then to the Daechi-dong, Gangnam-gu in 1974.

In 1976, the school was renamed the Kangnam Social Welfare School; the name, which the university kept to this day, comes from its city ward at the time. In 1980, the school moved to its present location in Yongin, Gyeonggi-do, South Korea. Kangnam received its university accreditation in 1992.

The EverLine has a station nearby which has been in operation since 2013.

== Colleges ==
- Liberal Arts College
- College of International Studies
- College of Business Administration

== See also ==
- List of colleges and universities in South Korea
- Education in South Korea
