= Buwon station =

Station of the Busan Metro

15 부원 (최안과의원) Buwon (Choi Ophthalmology Clinic)
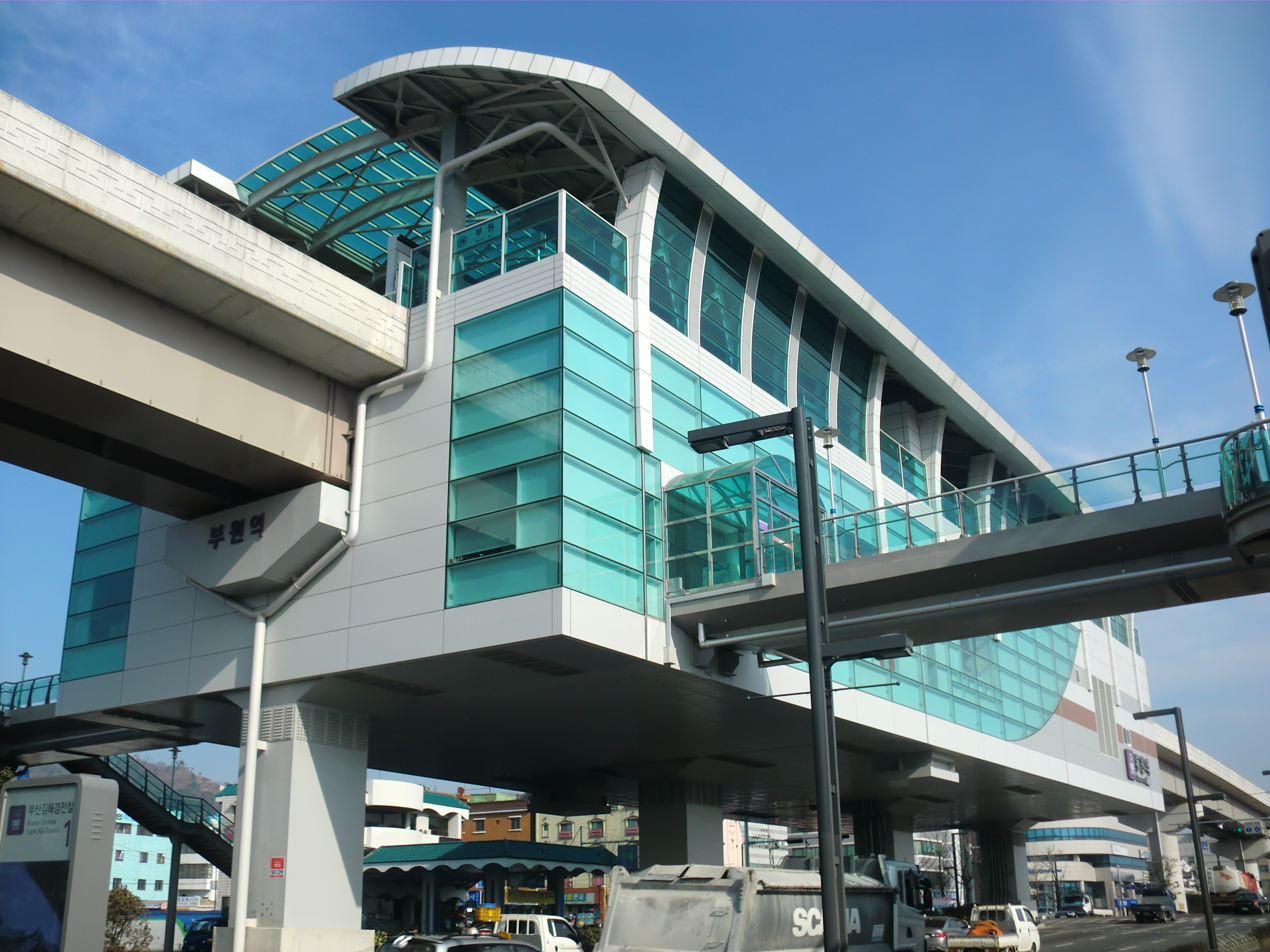

Korean name
- Hangul: 부원역
- Hanja: 府院驛
- Revised Romanization: Buwon-yeok
- McCune–Reischauer: Puwŏn-yŏk

General information
- Location: Buwon-dong, Gimhae; South Korea
- Coordinates: 35.2265°N 128.8838°E
- Operator: Busan–Gimhae Light Rail Transit Operation Corporation
- Line: Busan–Gimhae Light Rail Transit
- Platforms: 2
- Tracks: 2

Construction
- Structure type: Aboveground
- Cycle facilities: Yes
- Accessible: Yes

Other information
- Station code: 15

History
- Opened: September 16, 2011

Services
Preceding station	Busan Metro	Following station
Gimhae City Hall towards Sasang	Busan–Gimhae Light Rail Transit	Bonghwang towards Kaya University
Location

Buwon Station (Korean: 부원역) is a station of the BGLRT Line of Busan Metro in Buwon-dong, Gimhae, South Korea.

== Station Layout ==
L2; Platforms	Side platform, doors will open on the right
L2; Platforms	Southbound	← Busan–Gimhae LRT toward Sasang (Gimhae College)
L2; Platforms	Northbound	Busan–Gimhae LRT toward Kaya University (Bonghwang) →
L2; Platforms	Side platform, doors will open on the right
L1	Concourse	Faregates, Shops, Vending machines, ATMs
G	Street Level

== Exits ==
Exit No.	Image	Destinations	Transport Links
1		UNIQLO, Gimhae ISQUARE	1 1-1 2 7 31A 35 127 300 300A 대동공영
2		Quiznos	
