= Daesa station =

Station of the Busan Metro

9 대사 Daesa
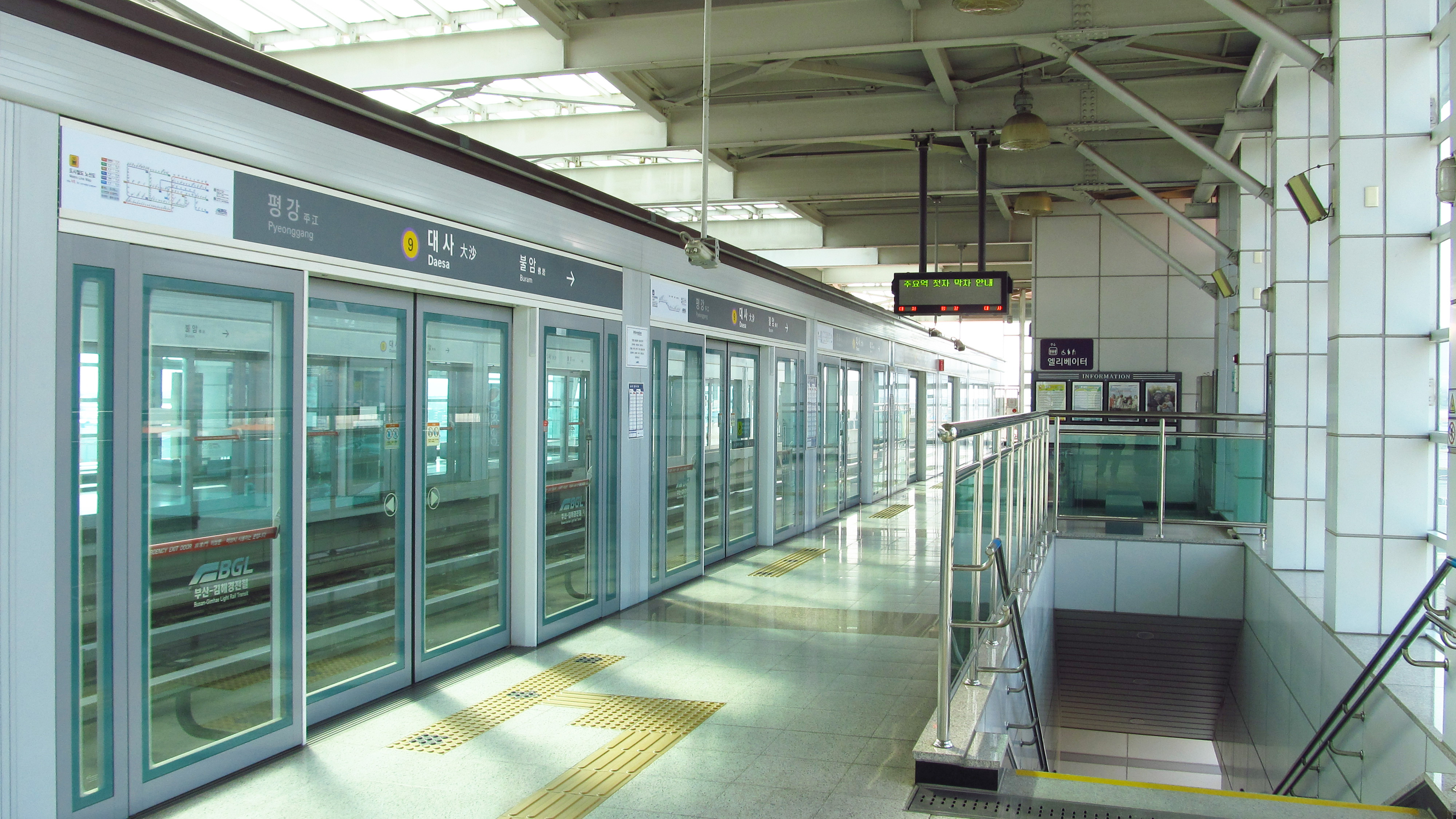

Korean name
- Hangul: 대사역
- Hanja: 大沙驛
- Revised Romanization: Daesa-yeok
- McCune–Reischauer: Taesa-yŏk

General information
- Location: Gangdong-dong, Gangseo District, Busan; South Korea
- Coordinates: 35.2177°N 128.9385°E
- Operator: Busan–Gimhae Light Rail Transit Operation Corporation
- Line: Busan–Gimhae Light Rail Transit
- Platforms: 2
- Tracks: 2

Construction
- Structure type: Aboveground
- Cycle facilities: Yes
- Accessible: Yes

Other information
- Station code: 9

History
- Opened: September 16, 2011

Services
Preceding station	Busan Metro	Following station
Pyeonggang towards Sasang	Busan–Gimhae Light Rail Transit	Buram towards Kaya University
Location

Daesa Station (Korean: 대사역) is a station of the BGLRT Line of Busan Metro in Gangdong-dong, Gangseo District, Busan, South Korea.

== Station Layout ==
L2; Platforms	Side platform, doors will open on the right
L2; Platforms	Southbound	← Busan–Gimhae LRT toward Sasang (Pyeonggang)
L2; Platforms	Northbound	Busan–Gimhae LRT toward Kaya University (Buram) →
L2; Platforms	Side platform, doors will open on the right

L1; Concourse	Faregates, Shops, Vending machines, ATMs

G	Street level

== Vicinity ==
- Exit 1: Shinmart Gangdong-dong Branch
- Exit 2: Daesayeog
