= Pyeonggang station =

Station of the Busan Metro

8 평강 Pyeonggang
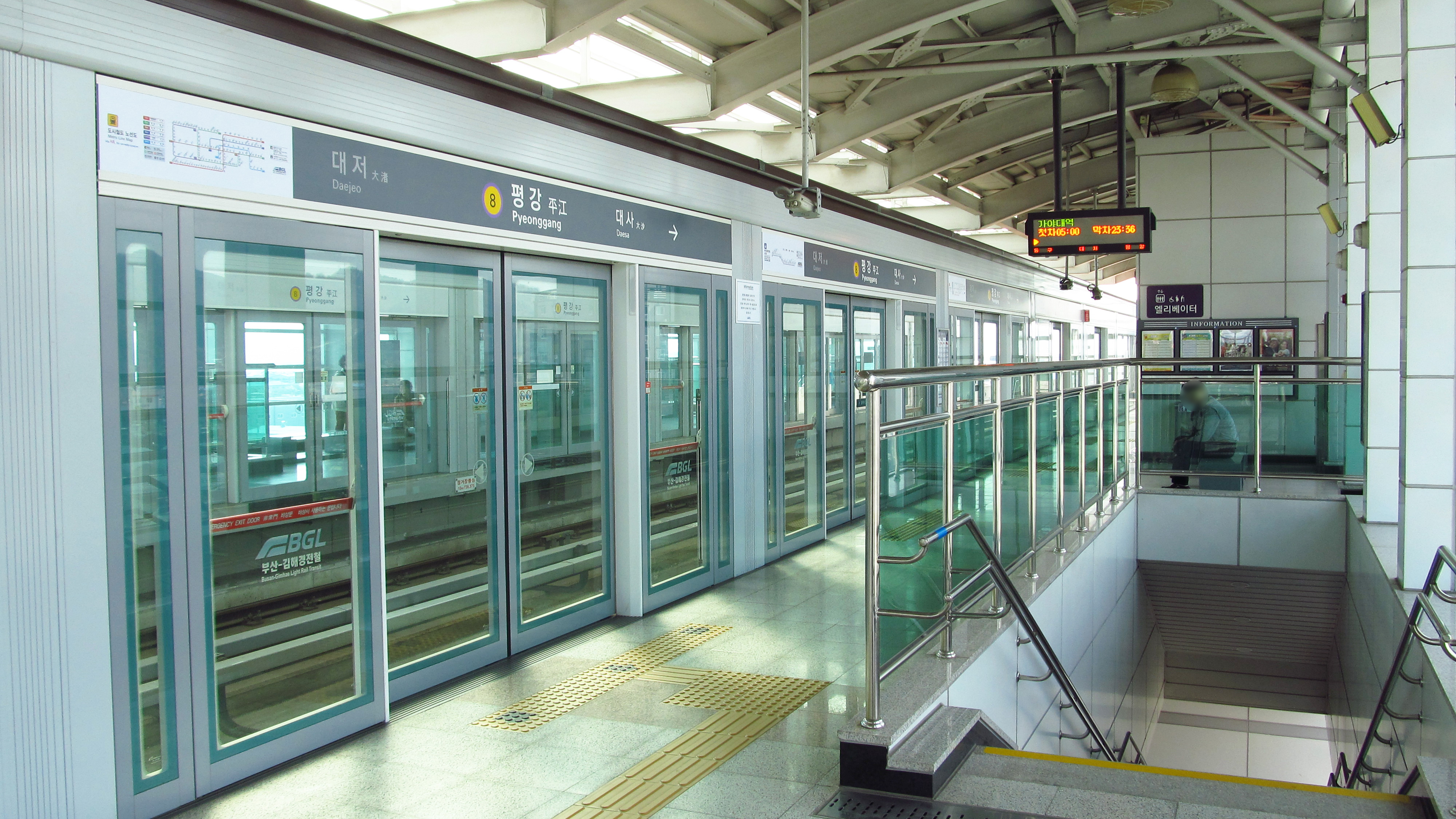

Korean name
- Hangul: 평강역
- Hanja: 平江驛
- Revised Romanization: Pyeonggang yeok
- McCune–Reischauer: P'yŏnggang yŏk

General information
- Location: Daejeo-dong, Gangseo District, Busan; South Korea
- Coordinates: 35.2140°N 128.9508°E
- Operator: Busan–Gimhae Light Rail Transit Operation Corporation
- Line: Busan–Gimhae Light Rail Transit
- Platforms: 2
- Tracks: 2

Construction
- Structure type: Aboveground

Other information
- Station code: 8

History
- Opened: September 16, 2011

Services
Preceding station	Busan Metro	Following station
Daejeo towards Sasang	Busan–Gimhae Light Rail Transit	Daesa towards Kaya University
Location

Pyeonggang Station (Korean: 평강역; Hanja: 平江驛) is a station of the BGLRT Line of Busan Metro. The station name comes from the nearest Pyeonggang-ro. The station is located at Daejeo-dong, Gangseo District, Busan, South Korea.

== Station Layout ==
L2; Platforms	Side platform, doors will open on the right
L2; Platforms	Southbound	← Busan–Gimhae LRT toward Sasang (Daejeo)
L2; Platforms	Northbound	Busan–Gimhae LRT toward Kaya University (Daesa) →
L2; Platforms	Side platform, doors will open on the right

L1; Concourse	Faregates, Shops, Vending machines, ATMs

G	Street level
