= Deunggu station =

Station of the Busan Metro

6 등구 Deunggu
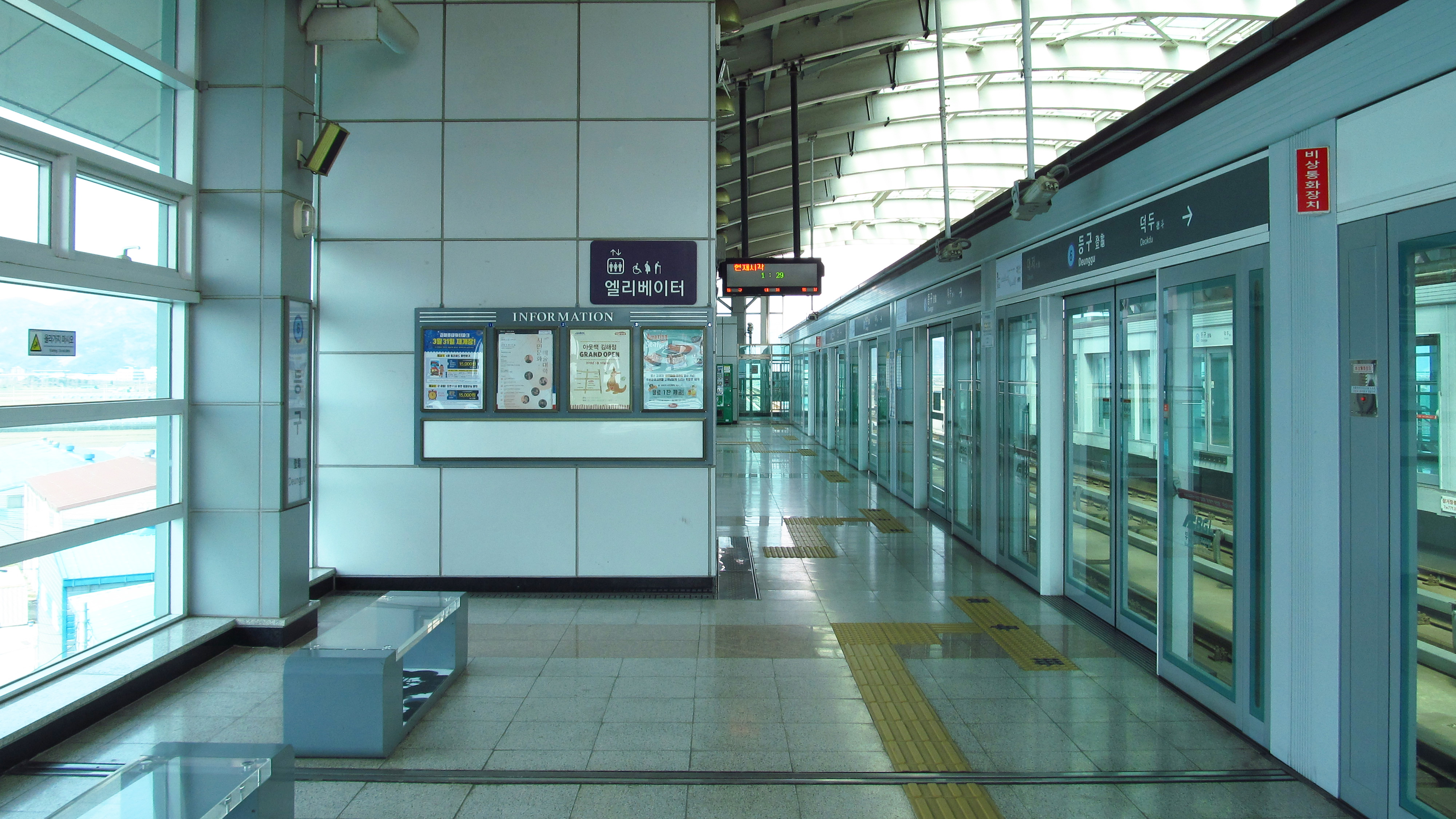

Korean name
- Hangul: 등구역
- Hanja: 登龜驛
- Revised Romanization: Deunggu-yeok
- McCune–Reischauer: Tŭnggu-yŏk

General information
- Location: Daejeo-dong, Gangseo District, Busan; South Korea
- Coordinates: 35.1962°N 128.9636°E
- Operator: Busan–Gimhae Light Rail Transit Operation Corporation
- Line: Busan–Gimhae Light Rail Transit
- Platforms: 2
- Tracks: 2

Construction
- Structure type: Aboveground

Other information
- Station code: 6

History
- Opened: September 16, 2011

Services
Preceding station	Busan Metro	Following station
Deokdu towards Sasang	Busan–Gimhae Light Rail Transit	Daejeo towards Kaya University
Location

Deunggu Station (Korean: 등구역) is a station of the BGLRT Line of Busan Metro in Daejeo-dong, Gangseo District, Busan, South Korea.

== Station Layout ==
L2; Platforms	Side platform, doors will open on the right
L2; Platforms	Southbound	← Busan–Gimhae LRT toward Sasang (Deokdu)
L2; Platforms	Northbound	Busan–Gimhae LRT toward Kaya University (Daejeo) →
L2; Platforms	Side platform, doors will open on the right

L1; Concourse	Faregates, Shops, Vending machines, ATMs

G	Street level
