= Inje University station =

Station of the Busan Metro

Coordinates: 35.2282°N 128.9020°E

13 인제대 (활천) Inje Univ. (Hwacheon)
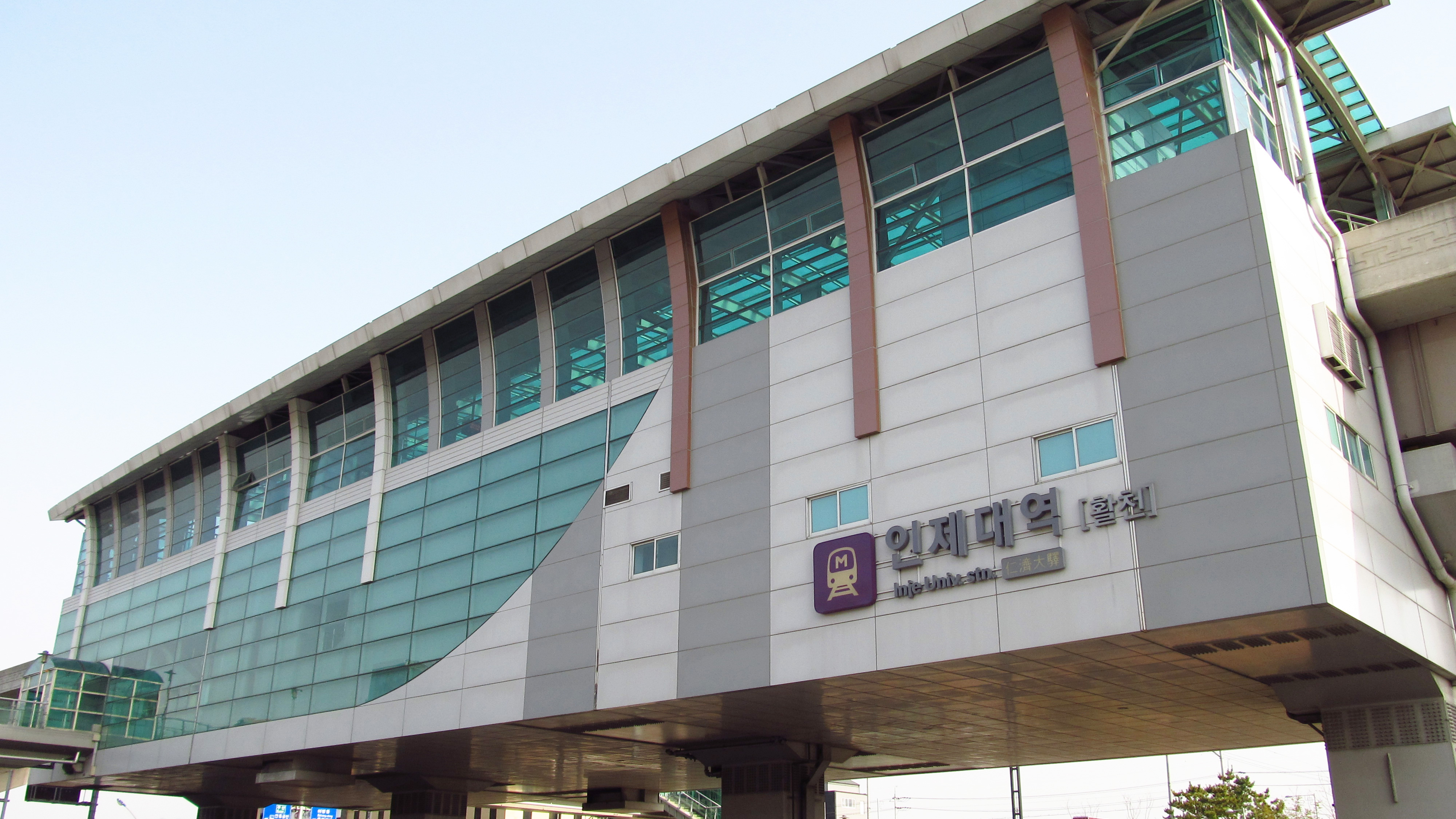

Korean name
- Hangul: 인제대역
- Hanja: 仁濟大驛
- Revised Romanization: Injedae-yeok
- McCune–Reischauer: Injedae-yŏk

General information
- Location: Samjeong-dong, Gimhae; South Korea
- Operator: Busan–Gimhae Light Rail Transit Operation Corporation
- Line: Busan–Gimhae Light Rail Transit
- Platforms: 2
- Tracks: 2

Construction
- Structure type: Aboveground
- Cycle facilities: Yes
- Accessible: Yes

Other information
- Station code: 13

History
- Opened: September 16, 2011

Services
Preceding station	Busan Metro	Following station
Gimhae College towards Sasang	Busan–Gimhae Light Rail Transit	Gimhae City Hall towards Kaya University
Location

Inje University Station (Korean: 인제대역; Hanja: 仁濟大驛) is a station of the BGLRT Line of Busan Metro in Samjeong-dong, Gimhae, South Korea.

== Station Layout ==
L2; Platforms	Side platform, doors will open on the right
L2; Platforms	Southbound	← Busan–Gimhae LRT toward Sasang (Gimhae College)
L2; Platforms	Northbound	Busan–Gimhae LRT toward Kaya University (Gimhae City Hall) →
L2; Platforms	Side platform, doors will open on the right
L1	Concourse	Faregates, Shops, Vending machines, ATMs
G	Street Level

== Exits ==
Exit No.	Image	Destinations	Transport Links
1		Daegu Bank	
2		Gimhae Fire Station	2 2-1 4 4A 7 82 123 124 127 1004 1004(심야) 대동공영
