= Seobusan Yutongjigu station =

Station of the Busan Metro

3 서부산유통지구 (금호마을·에어부산) Seobusan Yutongjigu (Geumho Village·Air Busan)
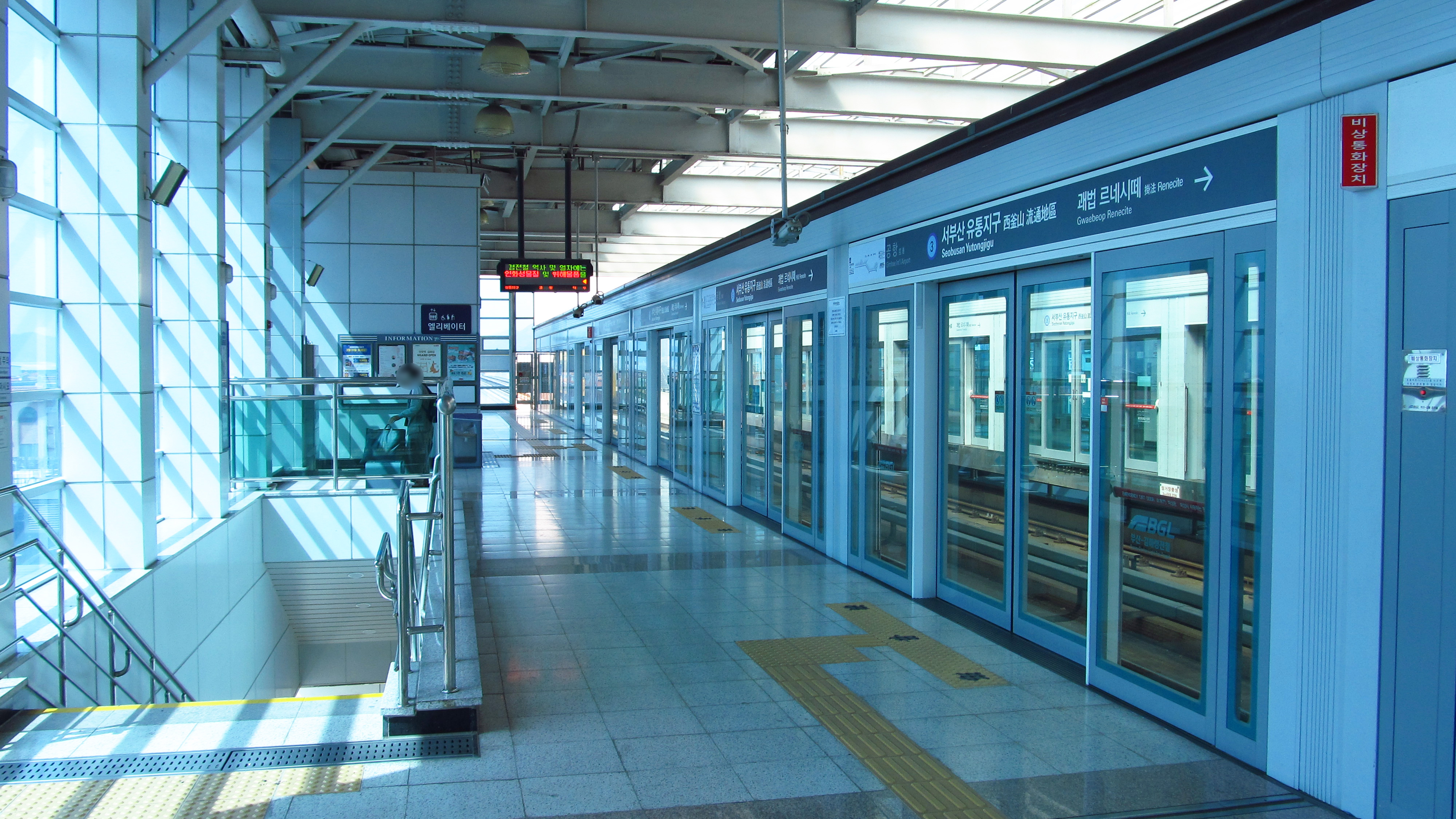
- Platform

Korean name
- Hangul: 서부산유통지구역
- Hanja: 西釜山流通地區驛
- Revised Romanization: Seobusan yutongjigu yeok
- McCune–Reischauer: Sŏbusan yut'ongjigu yŏk

General information
- Location: Daejeo-dong, Gangseo District, Busan; South Korea
- Coordinates: 35.1664°N 128.9550°E
- Operator: Busan–Gimhae Light Rail Transit Operation Corporation
- Line: Busan–Gimhae Light Rail Transit
- Platforms: 2
- Tracks: 2

Construction
- Structure type: Aboveground

Other information
- Station code: 3

History
- Opened: September 16, 2011

Services
Preceding station	Busan Metro	Following station
Gwaebeop Renecite towards Sasang	Busan–Gimhae Light Rail Transit	Gimhae International Airport towards Kaya University
Location

Seobusan Yutongjigu Station (Korean: 서부산유통지구역; Hanja: 西釜山流通地區驛) is a station of the BGLRT Line of Busan Metro in Daejeo-dong, Gangseo District, Busan, South Korea.

== Station Layout ==
L2; Platforms	Side platform, doors will open on the right
L2; Platforms	Southbound	← Busan–Gimhae LRT toward Sasang (Gwaebeop Renecite)
L2; Platforms	Northbound	Busan–Gimhae LRT toward Kaya University (Gimhae Airport) →
L2; Platforms	Side platform, doors will open on the right
L1	Concourse	Faregates, Shops, Vending machines, ATMs
G	Street Level

== Vicinity ==
- Exit 1: KEM Co., Ltd, Air Busan Headquarters
- Exit 2: Shinhan Bank
