= Buram station =

Station of the Busan Metro

10 불암 Buram
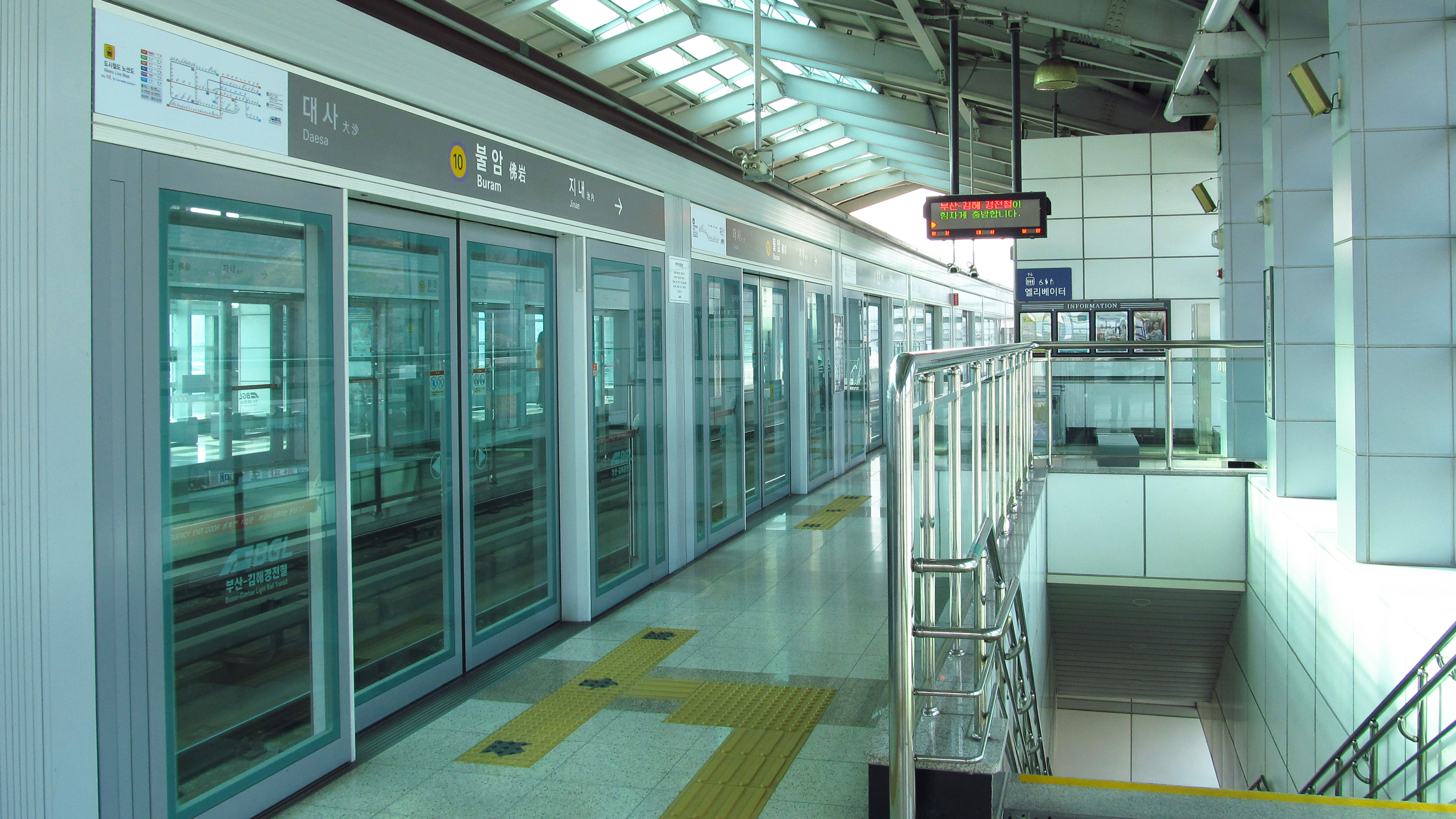

Korean name
- Hangul: 불암역
- Hanja: 佛岩驛
- Revised Romanization: Buram-yeok
- McCune–Reischauer: Puram-yŏk

General information
- Location: Buram-dong, Gimhae; South Korea
- Coordinates: 35.2222°N 128.9278°E
- Operator: Busan–Gimhae Light Rail Transit Operation Corporation
- Line: Busan–Gimhae Light Rail Transit
- Platforms: 2
- Tracks: 2

Construction
- Structure type: Aboveground
- Cycle facilities: Yes
- Accessible: Yes

Other information
- Station code: 10

History
- Opened: September 16, 2011

Services
Preceding station	Busan Metro	Following station
Daesa towards Sasang	Busan–Gimhae Light Rail Transit	Jinae towards Kaya University
Location

Buram Station (Korean: 불암역) is a station of the BGLRT Line of Busan Metro in Buram-dong, Gimhae, South Korea.

== Station Layout ==
L2; Platforms	Side platform, doors will open on the right
L2; Platforms	Southbound	← Busan–Gimhae LRT toward Sasang (Daesa)
L2; Platforms	Northbound	Busan–Gimhae LRT toward Kaya University (Jinae) →
L2; Platforms	Side platform, doors will open on the right

L1; Concourse	Faregates, Shops, Vending machines, ATMs

G	Street level

== Exits ==
Exit No.	Image	Destinations	Transport Links
1		Bul-Am-Yeog	8 8-1 97 98 123 124 125 127 128-1 1004 1004(심야)
