= Jinae station =

Urban railway station in South Korea

11 지내 Jinae
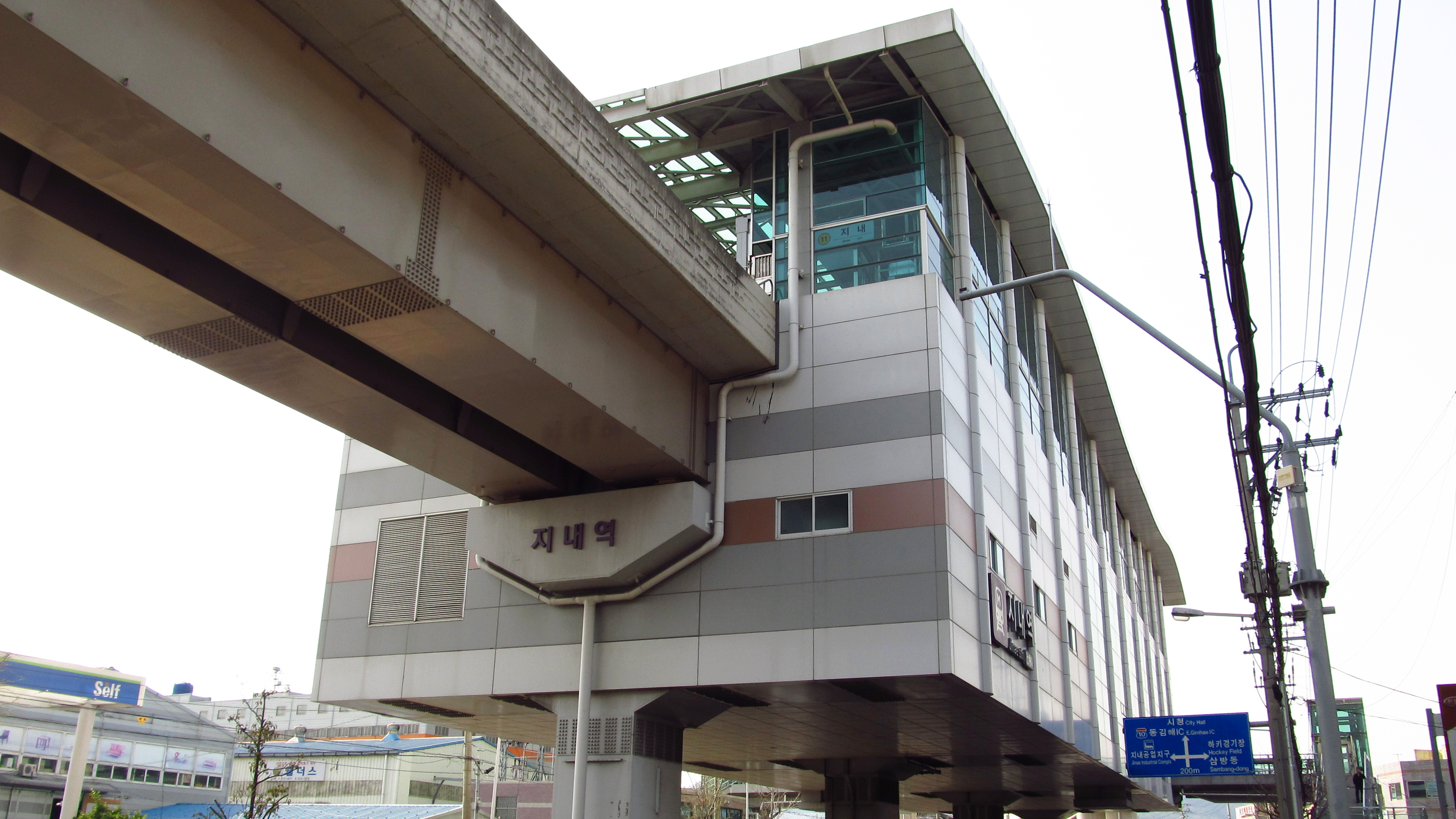

Korean name
- Hangul: 지내역
- Hanja: 池內驛
- Revised Romanization: Jinae yeok
- McCune–Reischauer: Chinae yŏk

General information
- Location: Jinae-dong, Gimhae; South Korea
- Coordinates: 35.2276°N 128.9237°E
- Operator: Busan–Gimhae Light Rail Transit Operation Corporation
- Line: Busan–Gimhae Light Rail Transit
- Platforms: 2
- Tracks: 2

Construction
- Structure type: Aboveground

Other information
- Station code: 11

History
- Opened: September 16, 2011

Services
Preceding station	Busan Metro	Following station
Buram towards Sasang	Busan–Gimhae Light Rail Transit	Gimhae College towards Kaya University
Location

Jinae Station (Korean: 지내역) is a station of the BGLRT Line of Busan Metro in Jinae-dong, Gimhae, South Korea.

== Station Layout ==
L2; Platforms	Side platform, doors will open on the right
L2; Platforms	Southbound	← Busan–Gimhae LRT toward Sasang (Buram)
L2; Platforms	Northbound	Busan–Gimhae LRT toward Kaya University (Gimhae College) →
L2; Platforms	Side platform, doors will open on the right

L1; Concourse	Faregates, Shops, Vending machines, ATMs

G	Street level

== Exits ==
Exit No.	Image	Destinations
1		4 4A 8 8-1 82 97 98 123 124 127 128-1 1004 1004(심야) 대동공영
