= Gimhae College station =

Station of the Busan Metro

12 김해대학 (안동) Gimhae College (Andong)
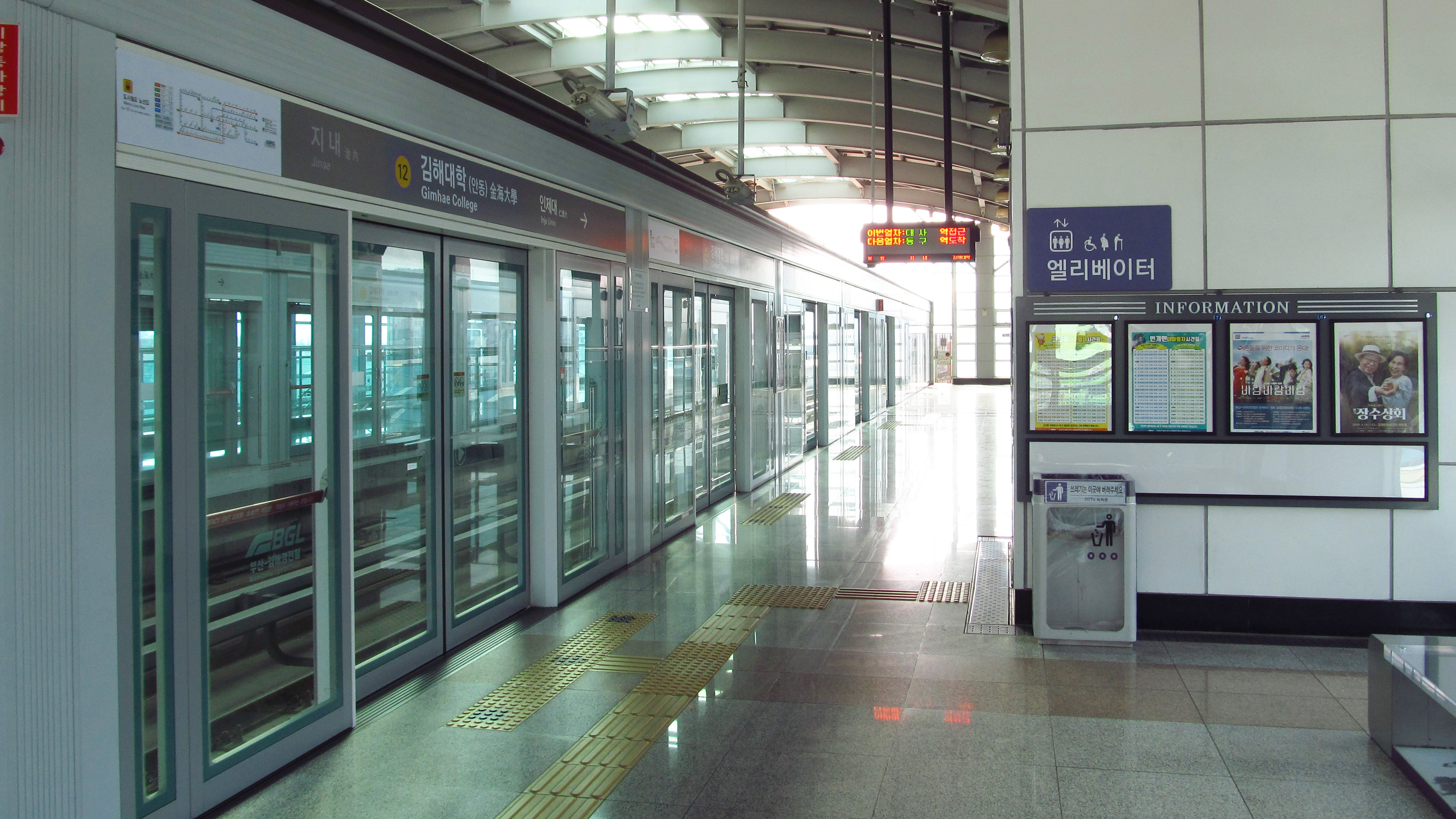

Korean name
- Hangul: 김해대학역
- Hanja: 金海大學驛
- Revised Romanization: Gimhae Daehak-yeok
- McCune–Reischauer: Kimhae Taehak-yŏk

General information
- Location: An-dong, Gimhae; South Korea
- Coordinates: 35.2291°N 128.9155°E
- Operator: Busan–Gimhae Light Rail Transit Operation Corporation
- Line: Busan–Gimhae Light Rail Transit
- Platforms: 2
- Tracks: 2

Construction
- Structure type: Aboveground
- Cycle facilities: Yes
- Accessible: Yes

Other information
- Station code: 12

History
- Opened: September 16, 2011

Services
Preceding station	Busan Metro	Following station
Jinae towards Sasang	Busan–Gimhae Light Rail Transit	Inje University towards Kaya University
Location

Gimhae College Station (Korean: 김해대학역) is a station of the BGLRT Line of Busan Metro in An-dong, Gimhae, South Korea.

== Station Layout ==
L2; Platforms	Side platform, doors will open on the right
L2; Platforms	Southbound	← Busan–Gimhae LRT toward Sasang (Jinae)
L2; Platforms	Northbound	Busan–Gimhae LRT toward Kaya University (Inje University) →
L2; Platforms	Side platform, doors will open on the right
L1	Concourse	Faregates, Shops, Vending machines, ATMs
G	Street Level

== Exits ==
Exit No.	Image	Destinations	Transport Links
1		Andong Gimhae University Station	1-1 2 4 4A 82 123 124 127 1004 1004(심야) 대동공영
2		Andong Gimhae University Station	4 4A 7 82 123 124 127 1004 1004(심야) 대동공영
