= Daejeo station =

Station of the Busan Metro

317 대저 Daejeo
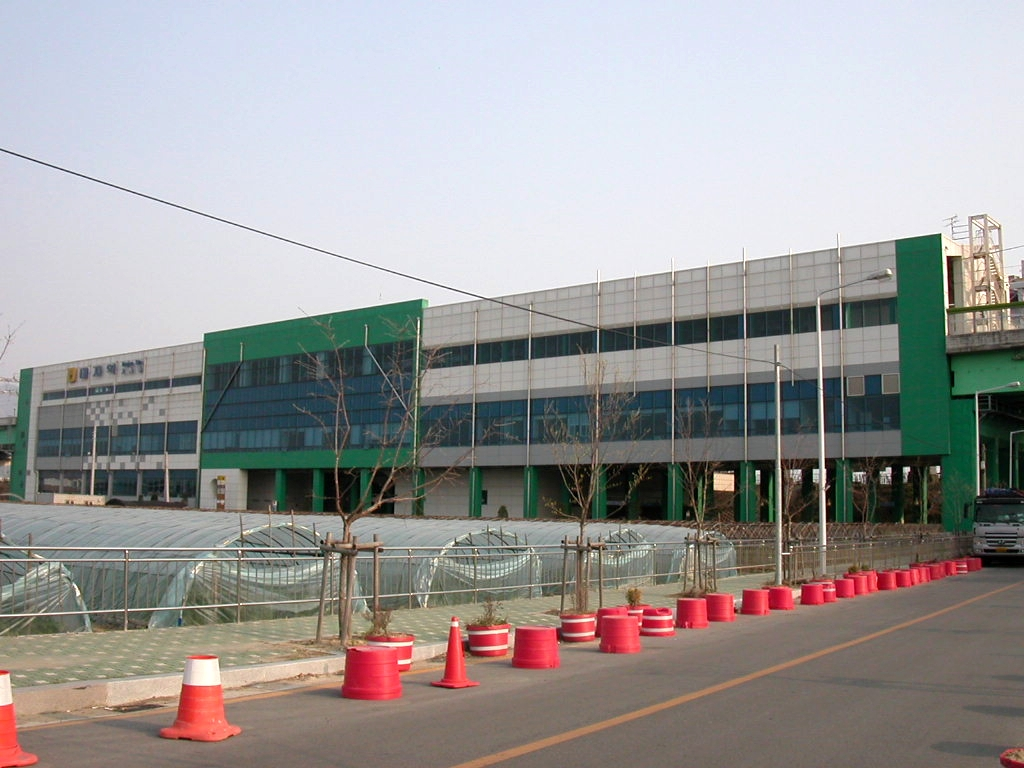

Korean name
- Hangul: 대저역
- Hanja: 大渚驛
- Revised Romanization: Daejeoyeok
- McCune–Reischauer: Taejŏyŏk

General information
- Location: Daejeo-dong, Gangseo District, Busan; South Korea
- Coordinates: 35°12′48.1″N 128°57′39.6″E
- Operator: Busan Transportation Corporation
- Line: Line 3
- Platforms: 1
- Tracks: 2

Construction
- Structure type: Aboveground

Other information
- Station code: 317

History
- Opened: November 28, 2005
- Former names: Jungri (before opening)

Services
Preceding station	Busan Metro	Following station
Sports Park towards Suyeong	Line 3	Terminus
Location

7 대저 Daejeo
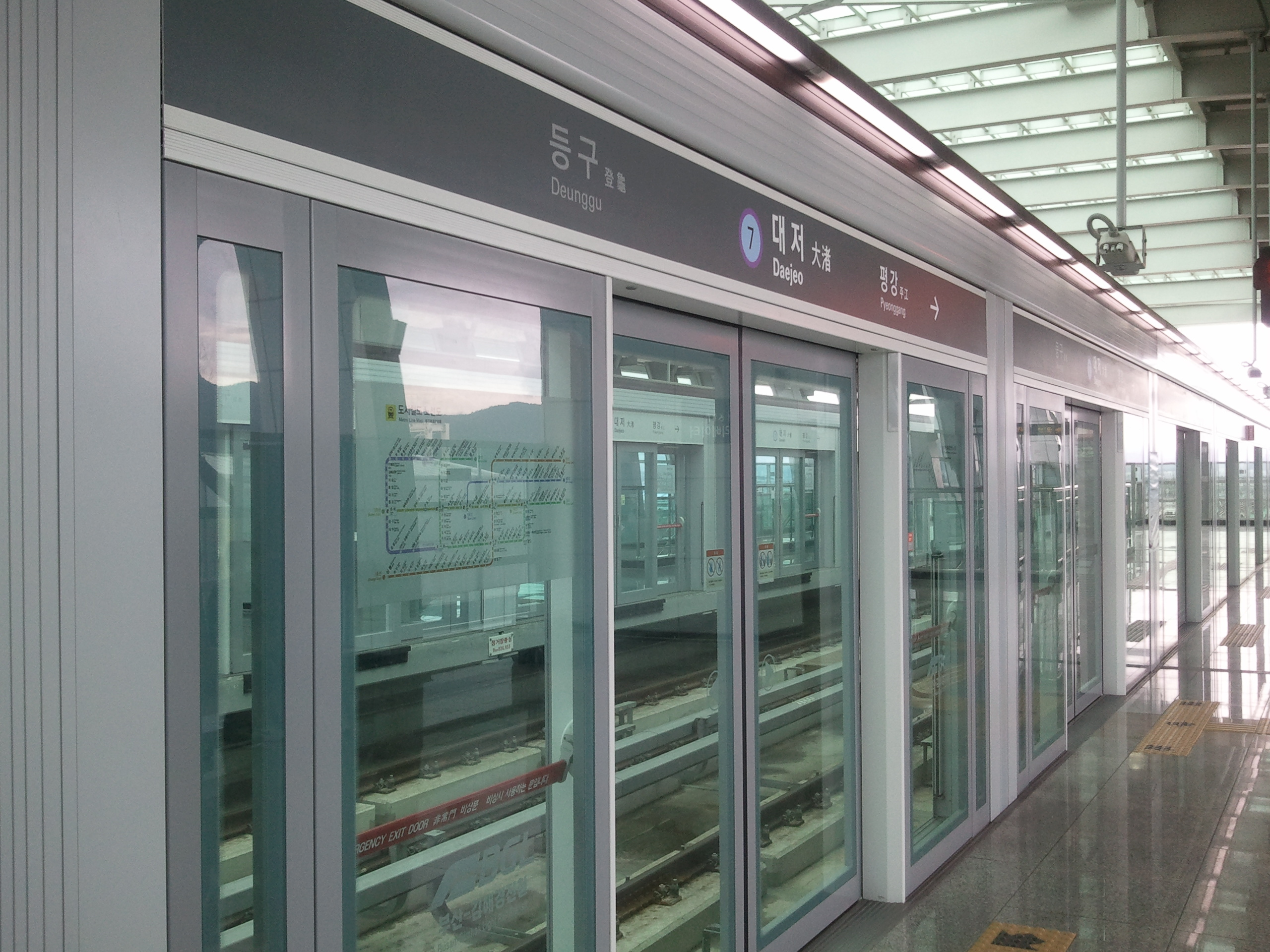
- Daejeo LRT platform

General information
- Location: Daejeo-dong, Gangseo District, Busan; South Korea
- Coordinates: 35°12′47.15″N 128°57′37.8″E
- Operator: Busan–Gimhae Light Rail Transit Operation Corporation
- Line: Busan–Gimhae Light Rail Transit
- Platforms: 2
- Tracks: 2

Construction
- Structure type: Aboveground
- Accessible: Yes

Other information
- Station code: 7

History
- Opened: September 16, 2011
- Former names: Seoyeonjeong (before opening)

Services
Preceding station	Busan Metro	Following station
Deunggu towards Sasang	Busan–Gimhae Light Rail Transit	Pyeonggang towards Kaya University
Location

Daejeo station (Korean: 대저역) is a station of the Busan Metro Line 3 and BGLRT Line located in Daejeo-dong, Gangseo District, Busan, South Korea. It is a southern terminus of Line 3 at this station. During the construction, the Line 3 Station was known as Jungni Station, and Busan-Gimhae Light Rail Station known as Seoyeonjeong Station.

== Station Layout ==
L2; Platforms	Side platform, doors will open on the right
L2; Platforms	Southbound	← Busan–Gimhae LRT toward Sasang (Deunggu)
L2; Platforms	Northbound	Busan–Gimhae LRT toward Kaya University (Pyeonggang) →
L2; Platforms	Side platform, doors will open on the right
L1	Concourse	Faregates, Shops, Vending machines, ATMs, Link to Line 3 station
G	Street Level	Exits
L1	Concourse	Faregates, Shops, Vending machines, ATMs, Link to BGL station
L2; Platforms	Southbound	← Line 3 toward Suyeong (Sports Park)
L2; Platforms	Island platform, doors will open on the left
L2; Platforms	Northbound	→ Line 3 Alighting Passengers Only or toward Daejeo Depot →

== Exits ==
Exit No.	Image	Destinations
1		GS25 Beomeo Station; Bus Stop
2		Daejo Line 3 station
1		Bus Stop
2		Daejo BGL station
