= Gwaebeop Renecite station =

Station of the Busan Metro

2 괘법르네시떼 (강변공원) Gwaebeop Renecite (Gangbyeon Park)
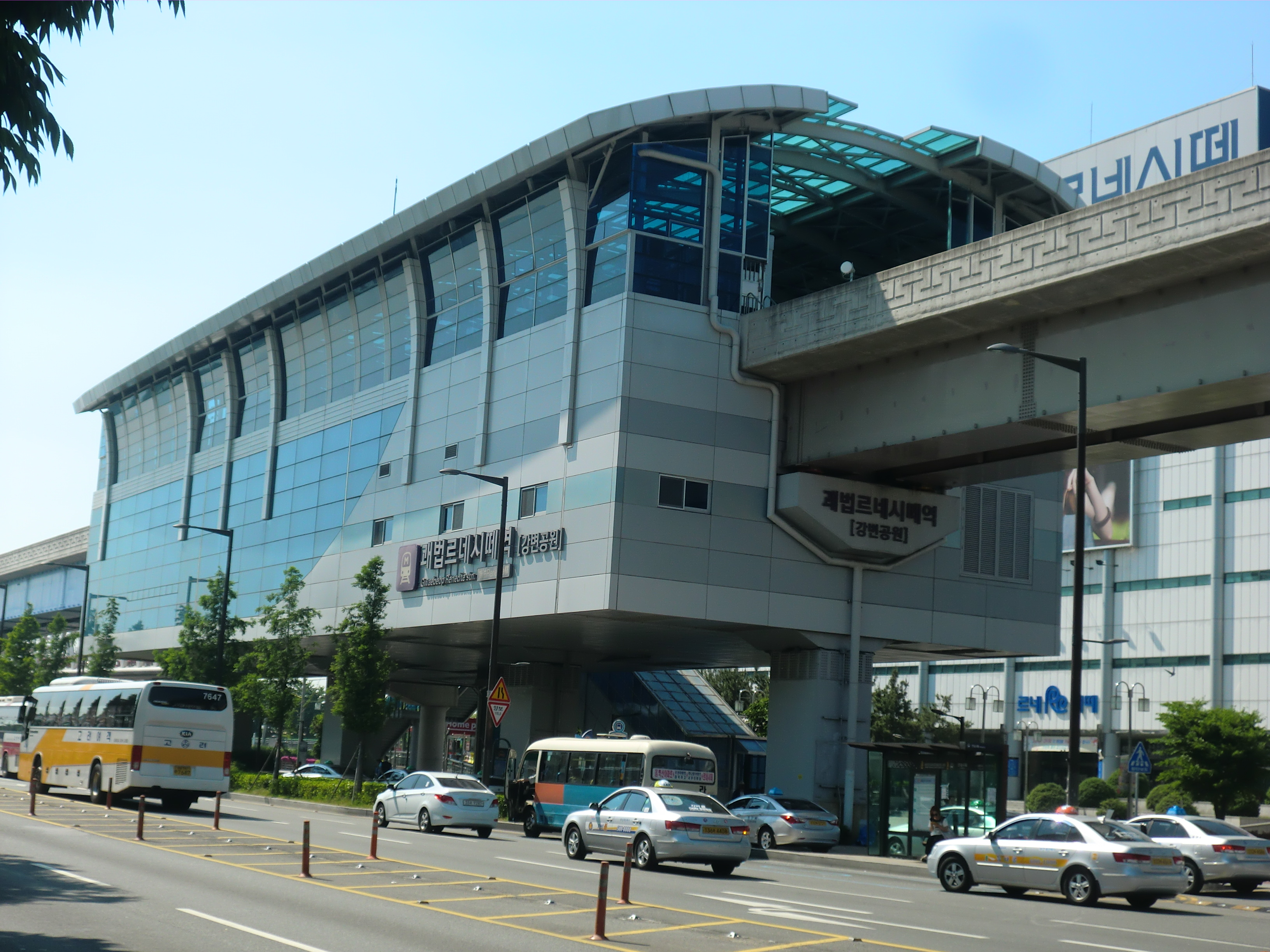
- View station at Gwangjang-ro

Korean name
- Hangul: 괘법르네시떼역
- Hanja: 掛法르네시떼驛
- Revised Romanization: Gwaebeop Reunesitte-yeok
- McCune–Reischauer: Kwaebŏp Rŭnesitte-yŏk

General information
- Location: Gwaebeop-dong, Sasang District, Busan; South Korea
- Coordinates: 35.1633°N 128.9778°E
- Operator: Busan–Gimhae Light Rail Transit Operation Corporation
- Line: Busan–Gimhae Light Rail Transit
- Platforms: 2
- Tracks: 2

Construction
- Structure type: Aboveground

Other information
- Station code: 2

History
- Opened: September 16, 2011

Services
Preceding station	Busan Metro	Following station
Sasang Terminus	Busan–Gimhae Light Rail Transit	Seobusan Yutongjigu towards Kaya University
Location

Gwaebeop Renecite Station (Korean: 괘법르네시떼역) is a station of the BGLRT Line of Busan Metro in Gwaebeop-dong, Sasang District, Busan, South Korea. The subname in parentheses of BGL is Gangbyeon Park where the Samrak Riverside Sports Park is nearby. A riverside bridge is installed from this station to the Samrak Riverside Sports Park.

== Station Layout ==
L2; Platforms	Side platform, doors will open on the right
L2; Platforms	Southbound	← Busan–Gimhae LRT toward Sasang (Terminus)
L2; Platforms	Northbound	Busan–Gimhae LRT toward Kaya University (Seobusan Yutongjigu) →
L2; Platforms	Side platform, doors will open on the right
L1	Concourse	Faregates, Shops, Vending machines, ATMs
G	Street Level

== Exits ==
Exit No.	Image	Destinations
1		Riverside Bridge to Samnak-dong; Nakdong Embankment Cherry Blossom Road; HomePlus Supermarket
2		

== Gallery ==
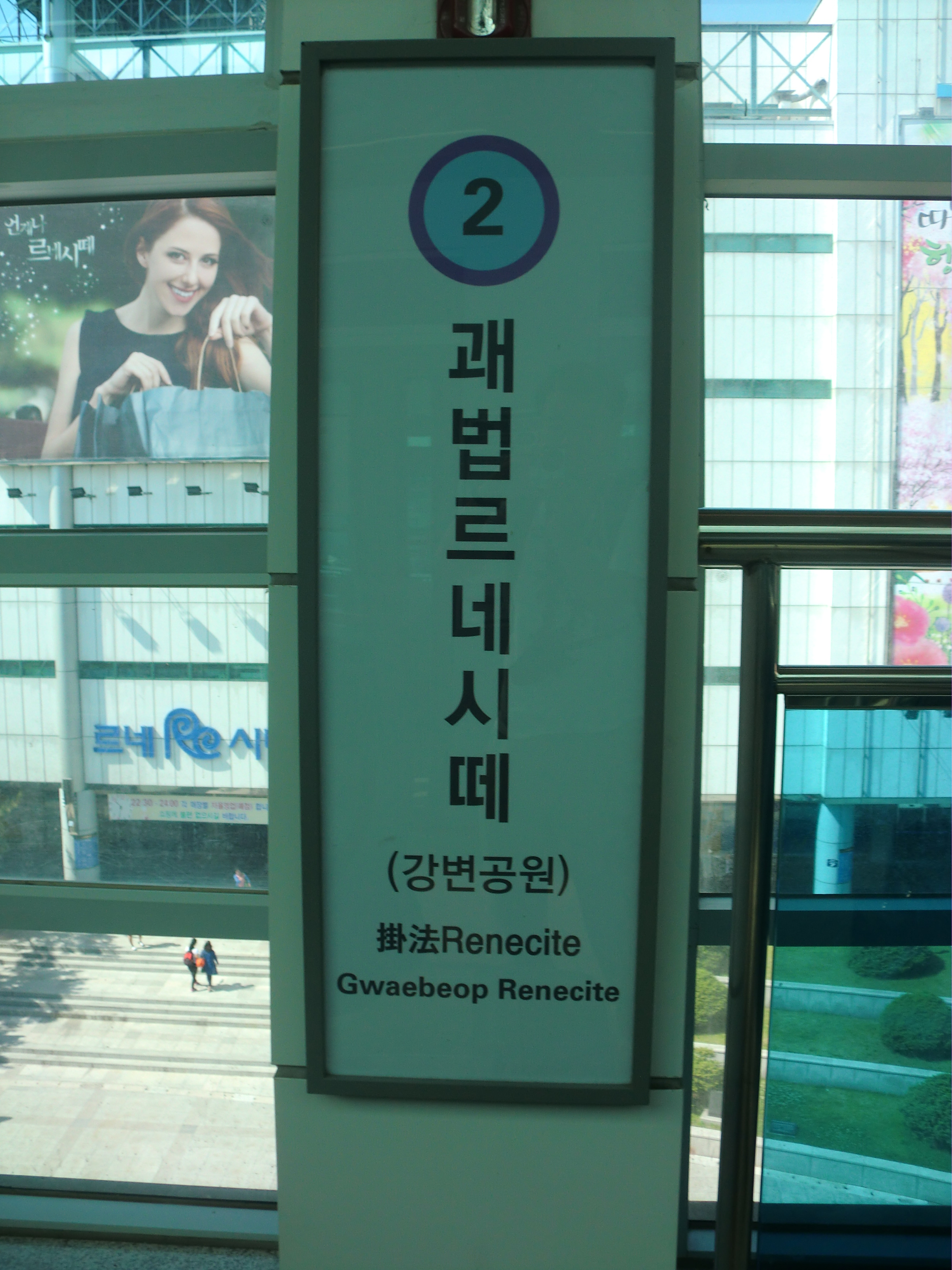
Station Sign

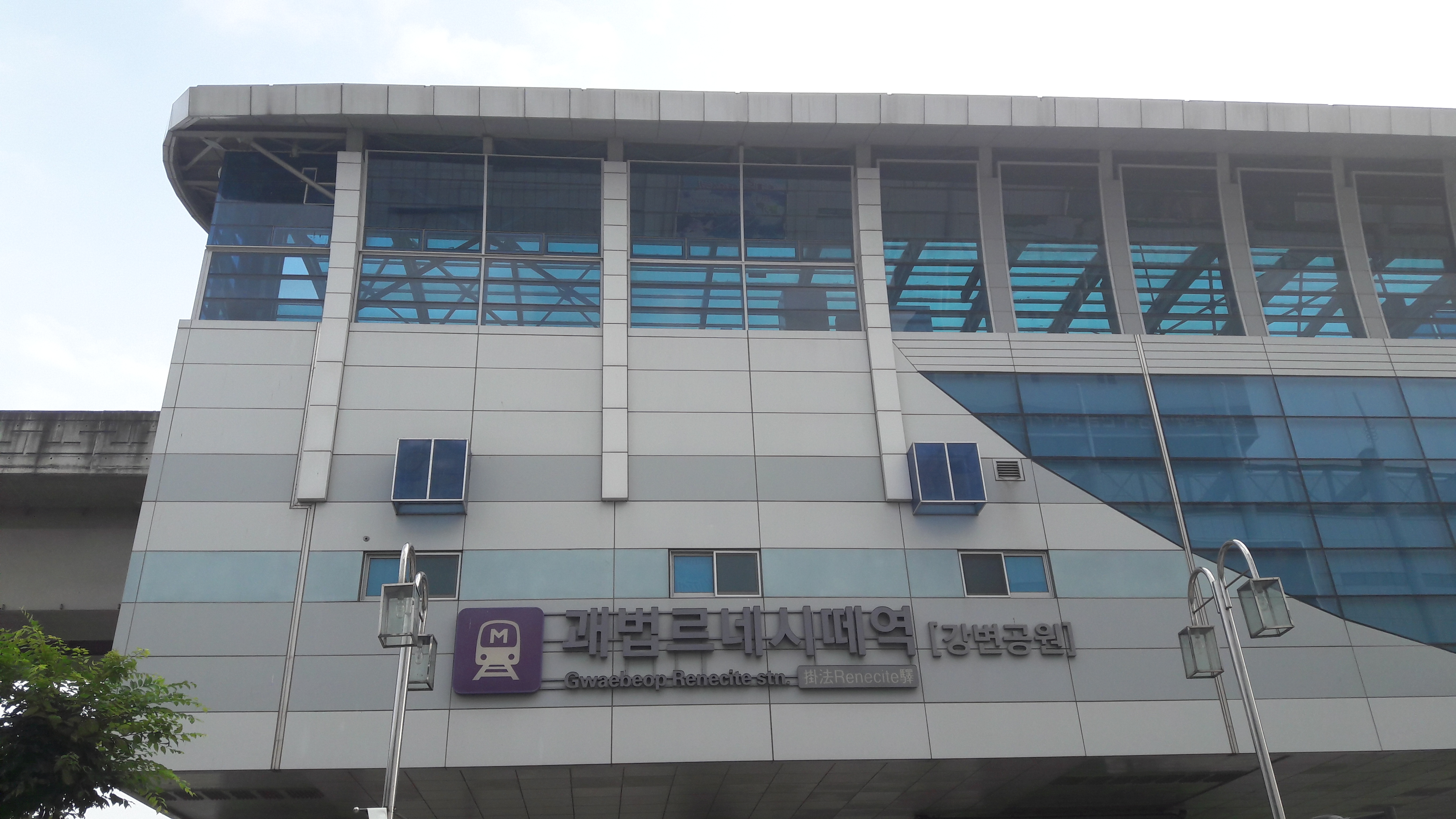
Gwaebeop Renecite Station Outside Sign

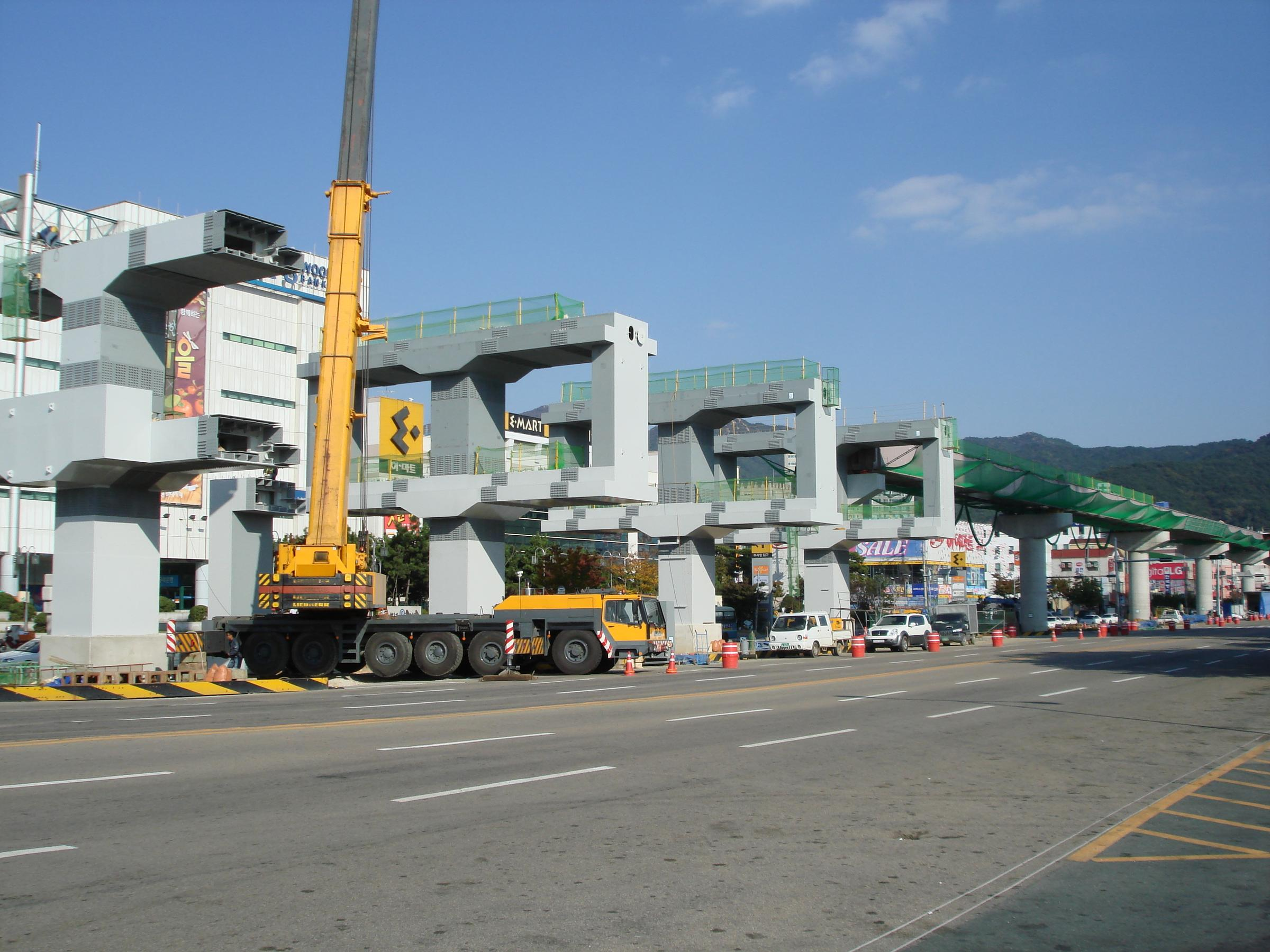
Gwaebeop Renecite Station during construction at the year 2007
