= Busan–Gimhae Light Rail Transit =

Light rail line in southeast South Korea

Busan-Gimhae LRT (BGL)

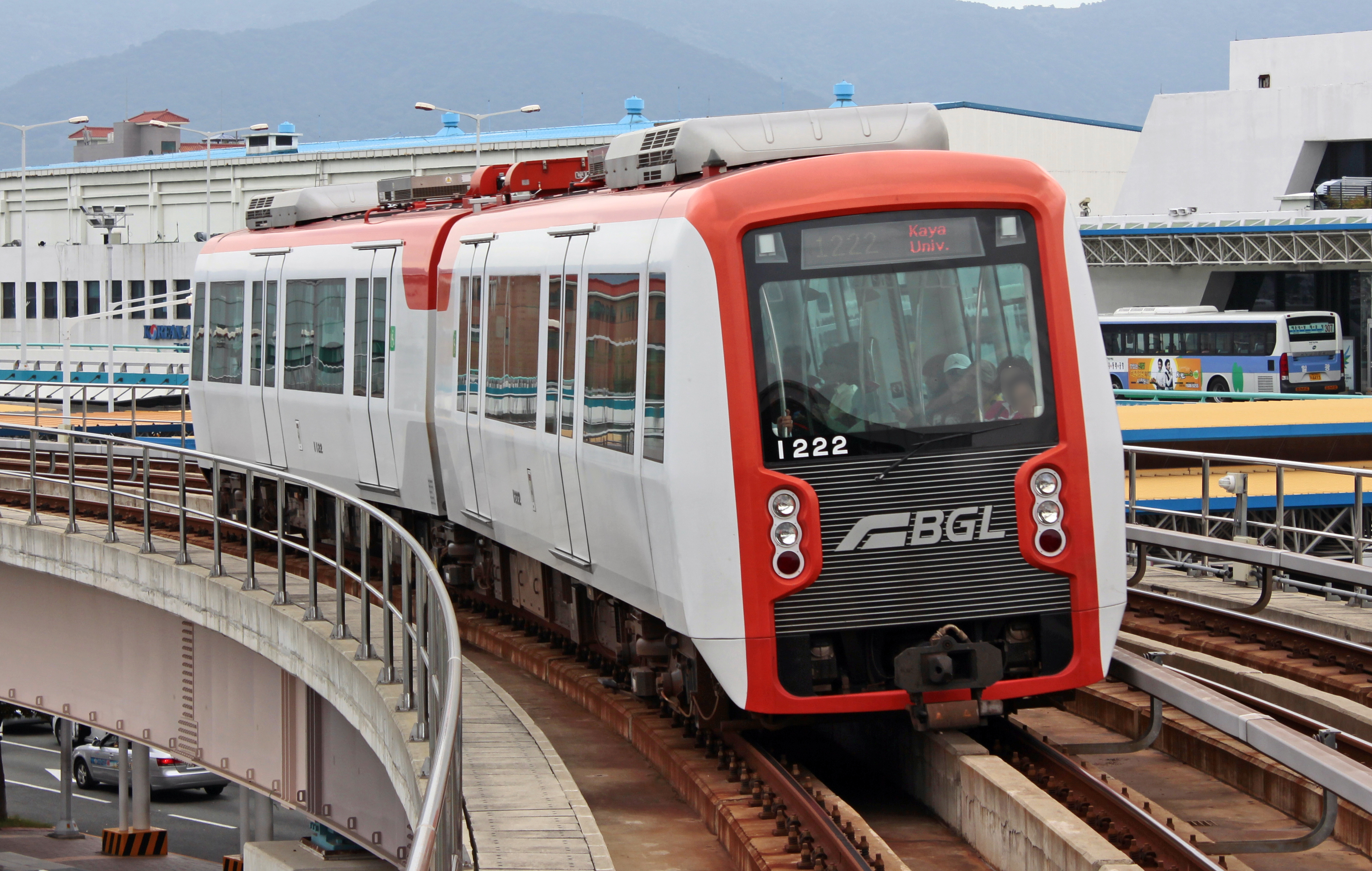

Overview
- Native name: 부산-김해 경전철（釜山-金海輕電鐵） Busan-Gimhae Gyeongjeoncheol
- Status: Operating
- Locale: Busan, South Korea
- Termini: Sasang; Kaya University
- Stations: 21

Service
- Type: Light metro
- System: Busan Metro
- Services: 1
- Operator(s): B&G Metro

History
- Opened: 9 September 2011

Technical
- Line length: 23.9 km (14.9 mi)
- Number of tracks: 2
- Track gauge: 1,435 mm (4 ft 8 1/2 in) standard gauge
- Electrification: 750 V DC third rail

The Busan–Gimhae Light Rail Transit is a light metro system between the cities of Busan and Gimhae in South Korea. The line has 21 stations including Daejeo and Sasang where passengers can transfer to Busan Metro Line 3 and Line 2 respectively. The line thus acts as a connecting rail between both Gimhae and Busan International Airport with two western outreaches of the Busan Metro system.

== Construction ==
Construction of the line started in February 2006, and after repeated delays, it was set to open on 29 July 2011; however, opening of the line was once postponed indefinitely due to noise abatement issues. The line finally opened on 9 September 2011 with one week of free service; revenue service began on 17 September 2011.

The line has a length of 23.9 kilometers (14.9 mi) with 21 stations, and a design capacity of 176,000 passengers per day.

The line is a joint venture between POSCO and Hyundai Rotem, and has a budget of 9,738 billion won. The line is fully automated and uses standard gauge.

== Signalling ==
The Busan–Gimhae Light Rail Transit is currently equipped with Thales SelTrac Communications-based train control (CBTC) moving block signalling system.

== Rolling stock ==
The line uses a dedicated fleet of 2-car trains built by Rotem, a member of Hyundai Motor Group. They are very similar to the trains subsequently built for the Ui LRT in Seoul.

== Stations ==
The line includes Gimhae International Airport Station. This is the station for Busan International Airport.

The stations at Sasang and Daejoe each connect with another line in the Busan urban rail network. Sasang connects with line 2 (green). Daejoe connects with line 3 (red).

Station Number	Station Name English	Station Name Hangul	Station Name Hanja	Busan Metro connecting lines	Distance in km	Total Distance	Location	
1	Sasang (Busan Seobu Intercity Bus Terminal)	사상 (서부터미널)	沙上 (西部터미널)	Busan Metro Line 2	---	0.0	Busan	Sasang
2	Gwaebeop Renecite (Samrak Riverside Park)	괘법르네시떼 (강변공원)	掛法르네시떼 (江邊公園)		0.6	0.6	Busan	Sasang
3	Seobusan Yutongjigu (Geumho Village)	서부산유통지구 (금호마을)	西釜山流通地區 (錦湖村)		2.2	2.8	Busan	Gangseo
4	Gimhae Int'l Airport	공항	空港		0.9	3.7	Busan	Gangseo
5	Deokdu	덕두	德斗		1.7	5.4	Busan	Gangseo
6	Deunggu	등구	登龜		1.7	7.1	Busan	Gangseo
7	Daejeo	대저	大渚	Busan Metro Line 3	1.7	8.8	Busan	Gangseo
8	Pyeonggang	평강	平江		0.8	9.6	Busan	Gangseo
9	Daesa	대사	大沙		1.1	10.7	Busan	Gangseo
10	Buram	불암	佛岩		1.0	11.7	South Gyeongsang	Gimhae
11	Jinae	지내	池內		0.5	12.2	South Gyeongsang	Gimhae
12	Gimhae College (Andong)	김해대학 (안동)	金海大學 (安洞)		0.7	12.9	South Gyeongsang	Gimhae
13	Inje University (Hwalcheon)	인제대 (활천)	仁濟大 (活川)		1.8	14.7	South Gyeongsang	Gimhae
14	Gimhae City Hall	김해시청	金海市廳		1.1	15.8	South Gyeongsang	Gimhae
15	Buwon	부원 (최안과의원)	府院		1.5	17.3	South Gyeongsang	Gimhae
16	Bonghwang (Gimhae Bus Terminal)	봉황 (김해여객터미널)	鳳凰 (金海旅客터미널)		0.8	18.1	South Gyeongsang	Gimhae
17	Royal Tomb of King Suro (Gimhae Health Center)	수로왕릉 (김해보건소)	首露王陵 (金海保健所)		0.5	18.6	South Gyeongsang	Gimhae
18	Gimhae National Museum	박물관	博物館		0.6	20.2	South Gyeongsang	Gimhae
19	Yeonji Park	연지공원	蓮池公園		1.0	21.2	South Gyeongsang	Gimhae
20	Presbyterian University (Hwajung)	장신대 (화정·강일병원)	長神大 (花停)		1.5	22.7	South Gyeongsang	Gimhae
21	Kaya University (Samgye)	가야대 (삼계)	加耶大 (三溪)		0.7	23.4	South Gyeongsang	Gimhae
