= Jang Ji-hun =

Korean baseball player

SSG Landers – No. 66
- Pitcher
- Born: December 6, 1998 (age 27); Gimhae, South Korea
- Bats: Right Throws: Right

KBO debut
- April 29, 2021, for the SSG Landers

Career statistics (through 2025)
- Win–loss record: 4–5
- Earned run average: 4.42
- Strikeouts: 94
- Stats at Baseball Reference

Teams
- SSG Landers (2021–present)

Jang Ji-hun (Korean: 장지훈; born January 6, 1998, in Gimhae, South Gyeongsang) is a South Korean pitcher for the SSG Landers in the Korea Baseball Organization.
