= Jillye-myeon =

- myeon
- Interactive map of Jillye-myeon
- Country: South Korea
- Administrative divisions: 10 ri

Korean name
- Hangul: 진례면
- Hanja: 進禮面
- RR: Jillye-myeon
- MR: Chillye-myŏn

Jillye-myeon (Korean: 진례면) is a small town located near the city of Gimhae, in the province of Gyeongsang, South Korea. As of 2005, the population was c. 8,000.

== Geography ==
Jillye-myeon is primarily situated in a horseshoe-shaped valley, with a range of mountains mostly surrounding it around its eastern, southern, and western sides. The largest of these mountains, on the southwestern side, is Sinan-ri. The larger city of Changwon is immediately on the other side of Sinan-ri, to the west. Gimhae is located about 10 kilometers to the east.

== Culture ==
Jillye-myeon is well noted and often visited for its ceramics-related arts and crafts. Many kilns and pottery shops can be found throughout town. The town is relatively rural, and being situated in a valley, it supports substantial rice agriculture.
