= Hanaro Card =

Smart card for public transport in Busan

Hanaro Card (Korean: 하나로카드) is contactless smart card used in the public transportation system in Busan, South Korea. First used in 1997, the Hanaro Card is now also used for paying at parking lots and toll booths.

The Hanaro system was adopted by Busan City in February 1998. This created the first integrated transport smart payment system in the world.
