= Gangseo District, Busan =

District of Busan, South Korea

Coordinates: 35°12′25″N 128°58′50″E

Gangseo
- Autonomous District
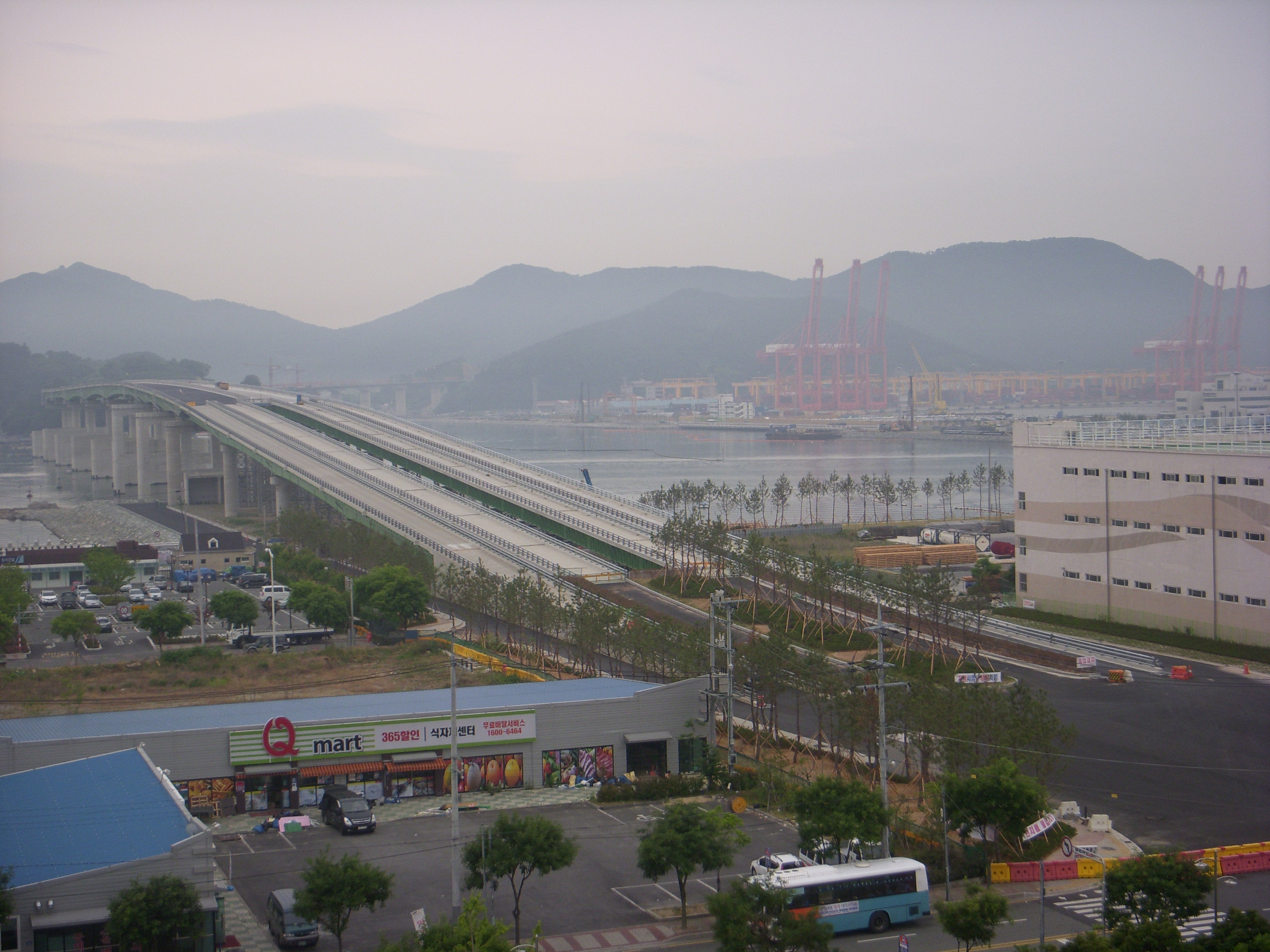

- Flag

- Country: South Korea
- Region: Yeongnam
- Provincial level: Busan
- Administrative divisions: 8 administrative dong

Government
  - Mayor: Park Sang-jun (박상준)

Area
  - Total: 181.05 km^{2} (69.90 sq mi)

Population (2024)
  - Total: 142,902
  - Density: 789.30/km^{2} (2,044.3/sq mi)
  - Dialect: Gyeongsang
- Website: Gangseo District Office

Korean name
- Hangul: 강서구
- Hanja: 江西區
- RR: Gangseo-gu
- MR: Kangsŏ-gu

District Office

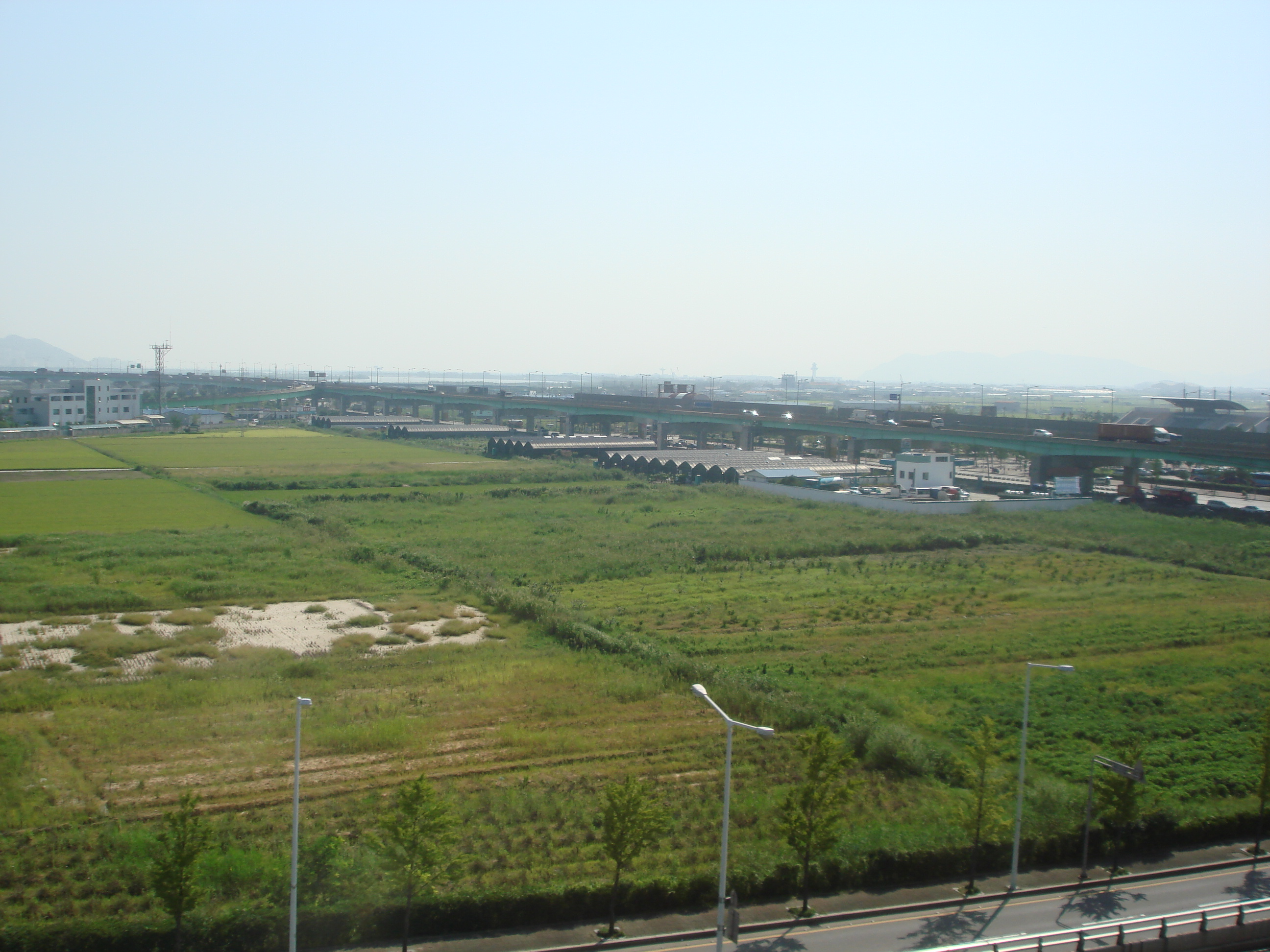
Farmland

Gangseo District (Korean: 강서구) is a gu on the west side of Nakdong River in Busan, South Korea. It has an area of 179.05 km^{2}, and a population of about 66,000; it has a lower population density than Gijang County of Busan. Gangseo-gu was part of Buk-gu from its creation in 1978 to 1989 when it became an independent gu.

Gangseo-gu is the westernmost gu in Busan and it shares a common borders with Gimhae on its north-west side and Jinhae District, Changwon on its south-west side.

Gangseo-gu is the birthplace of the Gaya civilization.

Gimhae International Airport, Heungguk Temple, Myeongwol Temple, as well as the Eulsukdo bird sanctuary are located in Gangseo-gu.

== Administrative divisions ==
Administrative divisions

Gangseo-gu is divided into 22 legal dong. They have been grouped together to form only 7 administrative dong, as follows:

- Daejeo 1-dong
- Daejeo 2-dong
- Gangdong-dong
- Myeongji 1-dong
- Myeongji 2-dong
- Garak-dong (4 legal dong)
  - Jukrim-dong, Sikman-dong, Jukdong-dong, Bongnim-dong
- Noksan-dong (9 legal dong)
  - Songjeong-dong, Hwajeon-dong, Noksan-dong, Saenggok-dong, Gurang-dong, Jisa-dong, Mieum-dong, Beombang-dong, Sinho-dong
- Gadeokdo-dong (5 legal dong)
  - Dongseon-dong, Seongbuk-dong, Nulcha-dong, Cheonseong-dong, Daehang-dong

== See also ==
- Geography of South Korea
