= Gimhae =

City in South Gyeongsang, South Korea

Coordinates: 35°14′03″N 128°52′52″E

- Specific city
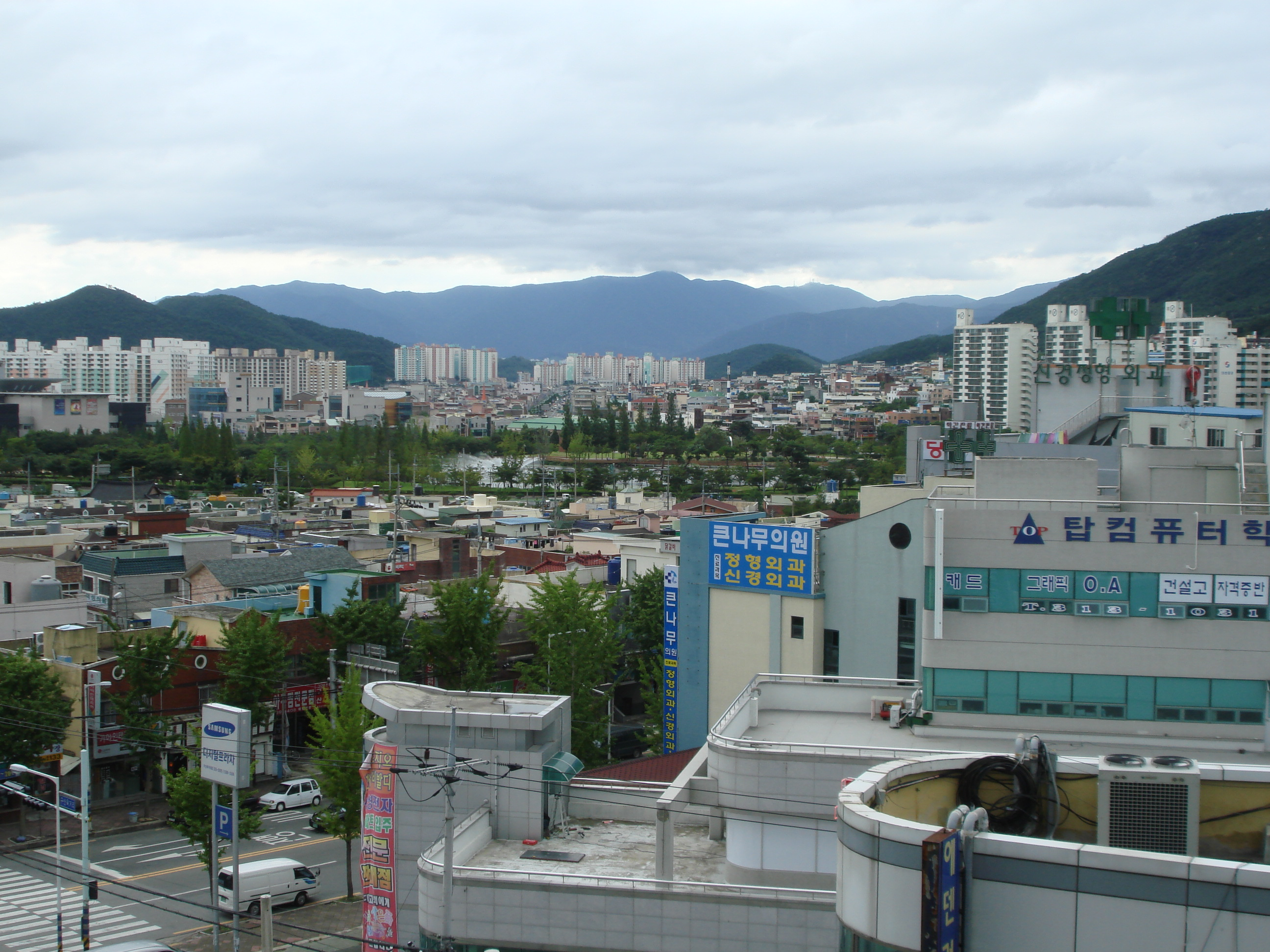
- West-side Gimhae

- Flag Emblem of Gimhae

- Location in South Korea
- Country: South Korea
- Region: Yeongnam
- Administrative divisions: 1 eup, 7 myeon, 9 dong, 0 gu

Area
  - Total: 463.45 km^{2} (178.94 sq mi)

Population (September 2024)
  - Total: 531,966
  - Density: 1,188/km^{2} (3,080/sq mi)
  - Dialect: South Gyeongsang Province

Korean name
- Hangul: 김해시
- Hanja: 金海市
- RR: Gimhae-si
- MR: Kimhae-si

Gimhae (Korean: 김해, pronounced [kim(ɦ)ɛ]) is a city in South Gyeongsang Province, South Korea, situated near the Nakdong River.

It is the seat of the large Gimhae Kim clan, one of the largest Kim clans in Korea, claiming descent from the ancient royal house of Geumgwan Gaya. Gimhae is also the birthplace of the late Roh Moo-hyun, former president of South Korea.

The city has a K League 2 football club called, Gimhae FC 2008, were previously compete in National League from 2008 until 2019 and K3 League from 2020 until 2025. The largest foreign sports club in Gimhae is the Gimhae Semi-Athletic Club (G-SAC) located in the Nae-dong neighbourhood.

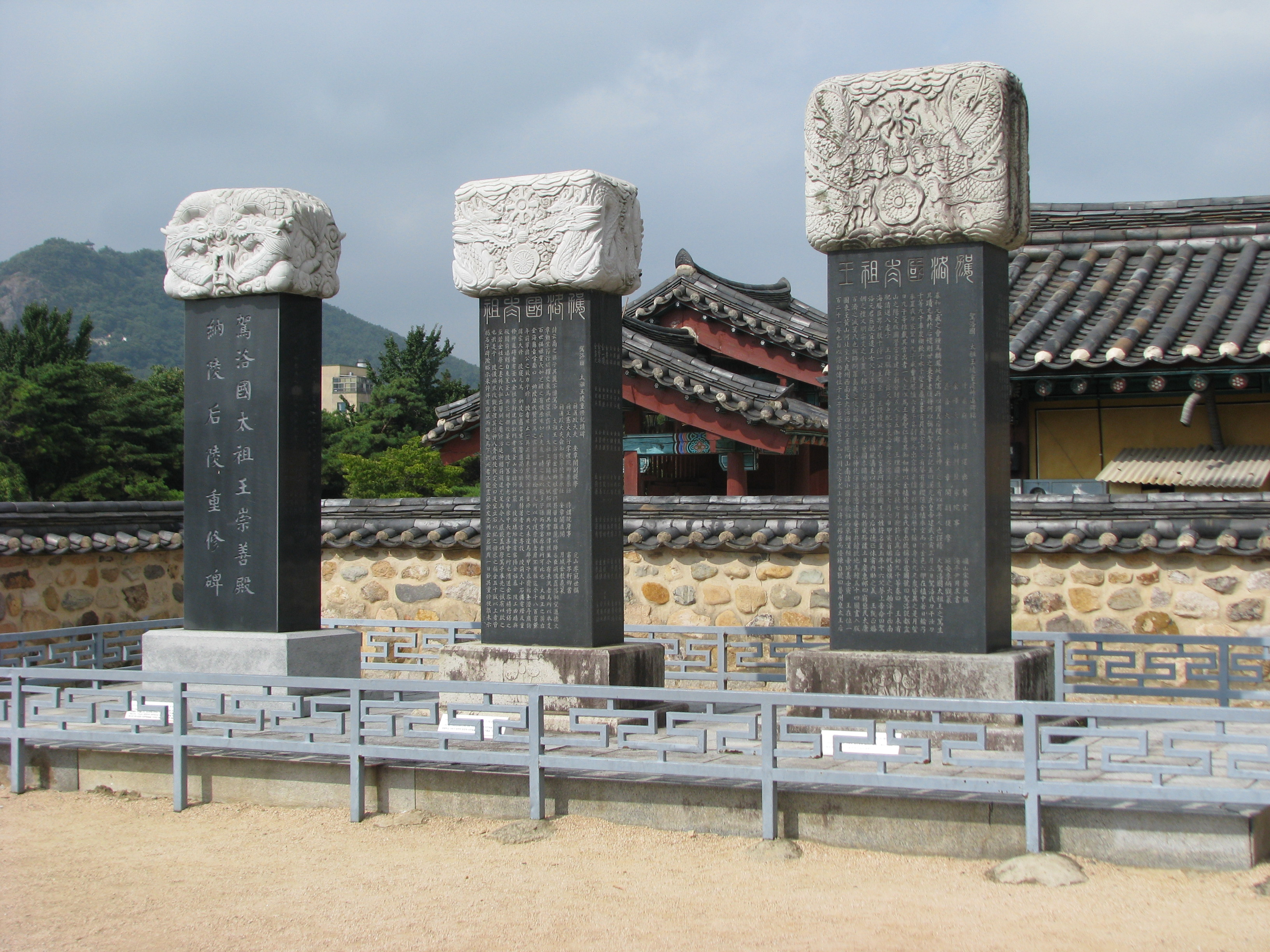
Tombstones in the Royal Tomb of King Suro

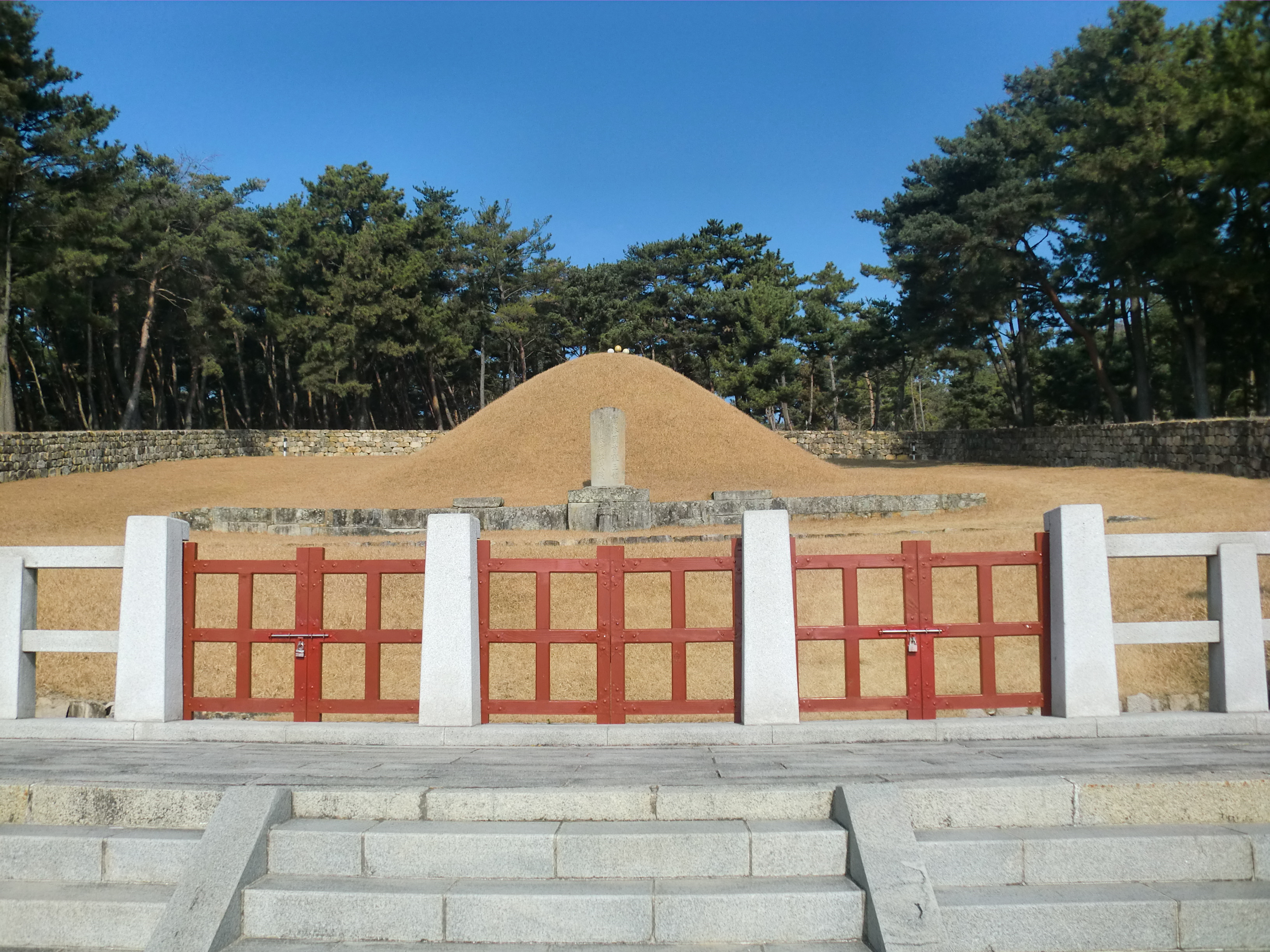
Royal Tomb of King Suro

== Administrative divisions ==
- Jinyeong-eup (13 ri)
- Daedong-myeon (10 ri)
- Hallim-myeon (12 ri)
- Jillye-myeon (10 ri)
- Juchon-myeon (8 ri)
- Saengnim-myeon (8 ri)
- Sangdong-myeon (6 ri)
- Bukbu-dong (3 legal dong)
- Buram-dong (2 legal dong)
- Buwon-dong
- Chilsanseobu-dong (7 legal dong)
- Dongsang-dong
- Hoehyeon-dong (2 legal dong)
- Hwalcheon-dong (2 legal dong)
- Jangyu-dong (3 legal dong)
- Naeoe-dong (2 legal dong)
- Saman-dong (2 legal dong)

== Climate ==
Gimhae has a humid subtropical climate (Köppen: Cwa, bordering on Cfa) with very warm summers and cold winters. Due to the influence of its coastal climate, Gimhae is the mildest region in Korea. The annual average temperature is around 15 °C, and annual average precipitation is 1,200 mm, which is very close to the Korean average of 1,274 mm.

Climate data for Gimhae (2009–2020 normals, extremes 2008–present)
Month	Jan	Feb	Mar	Apr	May	Jun	Jul	Aug	Sep	Oct	Nov	Dec	Year
Record high °C (°F)	18.4 (65.1)	22.3 (72.1)	24.4 (75.9)	28.9 (84.0)	33.6 (92.5)	35.3 (95.5)	37.8 (100.0)	39.2 (102.6)	35.6 (96.1)	31.4 (88.5)	26.6 (79.9)	21.4 (70.5)	39.2 (102.6)
Mean daily maximum °C (°F)	7.4 (45.3)	10.4 (50.7)	14.9 (58.8)	19.9 (67.8)	25.2 (77.4)	27.7 (81.9)	30.2 (86.4)	31.9 (89.4)	27.8 (82.0)	23.1 (73.6)	16.5 (61.7)	9.1 (48.4)	20.3 (68.5)
Daily mean °C (°F)	2.1 (35.8)	5.1 (41.2)	9.3 (48.7)	14.2 (57.6)	19.5 (67.1)	22.7 (72.9)	26.0 (78.8)	27.3 (81.1)	22.7 (72.9)	17.4 (63.3)	11.0 (51.8)	4.0 (39.2)	15.1 (59.2)
Mean daily minimum °C (°F)	−2.2 (28.0)	0.5 (32.9)	4.4 (39.9)	9.4 (48.9)	14.9 (58.8)	19.0 (66.2)	23.0 (73.4)	24.1 (75.4)	19.0 (66.2)	13.1 (55.6)	6.5 (43.7)	−0.4 (31.3)	10.9 (51.6)
Record low °C (°F)	−13.9 (7.0)	−12.4 (9.7)	−3.7 (25.3)	1.7 (35.1)	6.1 (43.0)	11.4 (52.5)	16.6 (61.9)	17.1 (62.8)	10.8 (51.4)	3.3 (37.9)	−4.6 (23.7)	−9.9 (14.2)	−13.9 (7.0)
Average precipitation mm (inches)	26.4 (1.04)	52.1 (2.05)	84.6 (3.33)	128.4 (5.06)	110.6 (4.35)	140.8 (5.54)	291.1 (11.46)	188.0 (7.40)	184.9 (7.28)	89.8 (3.54)	47.0 (1.85)	32.1 (1.26)	1,375.8 (54.17)
Average precipitation days (≥ 0.1 mm)	4.3	6.0	8.2	9.8	8.4	9.6	14.8	12.6	10.0	5.4	6.3	4.8	100.2
Average relative humidity (%)	46.1	50.8	55.3	57.8	62.2	71.8	79.0	75.4	73.2	64.3	58.7	49.6	62.0
Mean monthly sunshine hours	211.3	185.6	216.2	222.4	247.0	196.0	174.7	203.3	173.7	208.4	188.9	206.6	2,434.1
Source: Korea Meteorological Administration

== Transportation ==
=== Airport ===
Gimhae International Airport is just east of Gimhae (in Gangseo District, Busan) and has 9.17 million annual users.

=== Railways ===
Gimhae has two stations on the Gyeongjeon Line; Hallimjeong station (한림정역) and Jinyeong station (진영역). The Busan–Gimhae Light Rail Transit, which opened in September 2011, connects the city to Busan via the airport. It connects to the Busan Metro network at Daejeo (대저), and at Sasang (사상). The closest KTX station from Gimhae is Gupo station in Busan.

== Sports ==
Gimhae FC will compete in K League 2 from 2026 season after last play in 2025 K3 League due to switch from semi-profesional to professional team. Gimhae FC play in Gimhae Sports Complex were open in 11 September 2024 with capacity 15,066.

== Floricultural industry ==
Gimhae has spacious flower gardens. Busan and its neighbouring cities have exported large amounts of flowers. Gimhae farming centre exploited to develop independent Korean roses called Spray.

== Twin towns – sister cities ==
Gimhae is twinned with:

- Ayodhya, India
- Biên Hòa, Vietnam
- Çorum, Turkey
- Munakata, Japan
- Salem, United States
- Wuxi, China
- Lakewood, WA, United States

== Notable former residents ==
- Roh Moo-hyun, (August 6, 1946 – May 23, 2009), South Korean politician and 16th President of South Korea (2003–2008)
- Yoon Sung-hyo (born 1962), South Korean football manager and former football player
- Song Kang-ho (born 1967), South Korean actor (Snowpiercer, Drug King and Parasite)
- Lee Jung-soo (born 1980), South Korean footballer (central defender)
- Lee Min-ki (born 1985), South Korean actor, singer and model
- Yeo Min-ji (born 1993), South Korean women's footballer (Suwon UDC WFC, WK League)
- Yang Sang-guk (born 1983), South Korean comedian

== See also ==
- Administrative divisions of South Korea
- Geography of South Korea
- List of cities in South Korea
- Gimhae International Airport
