= Busan Metro =

Subway system of Busan, South Korea

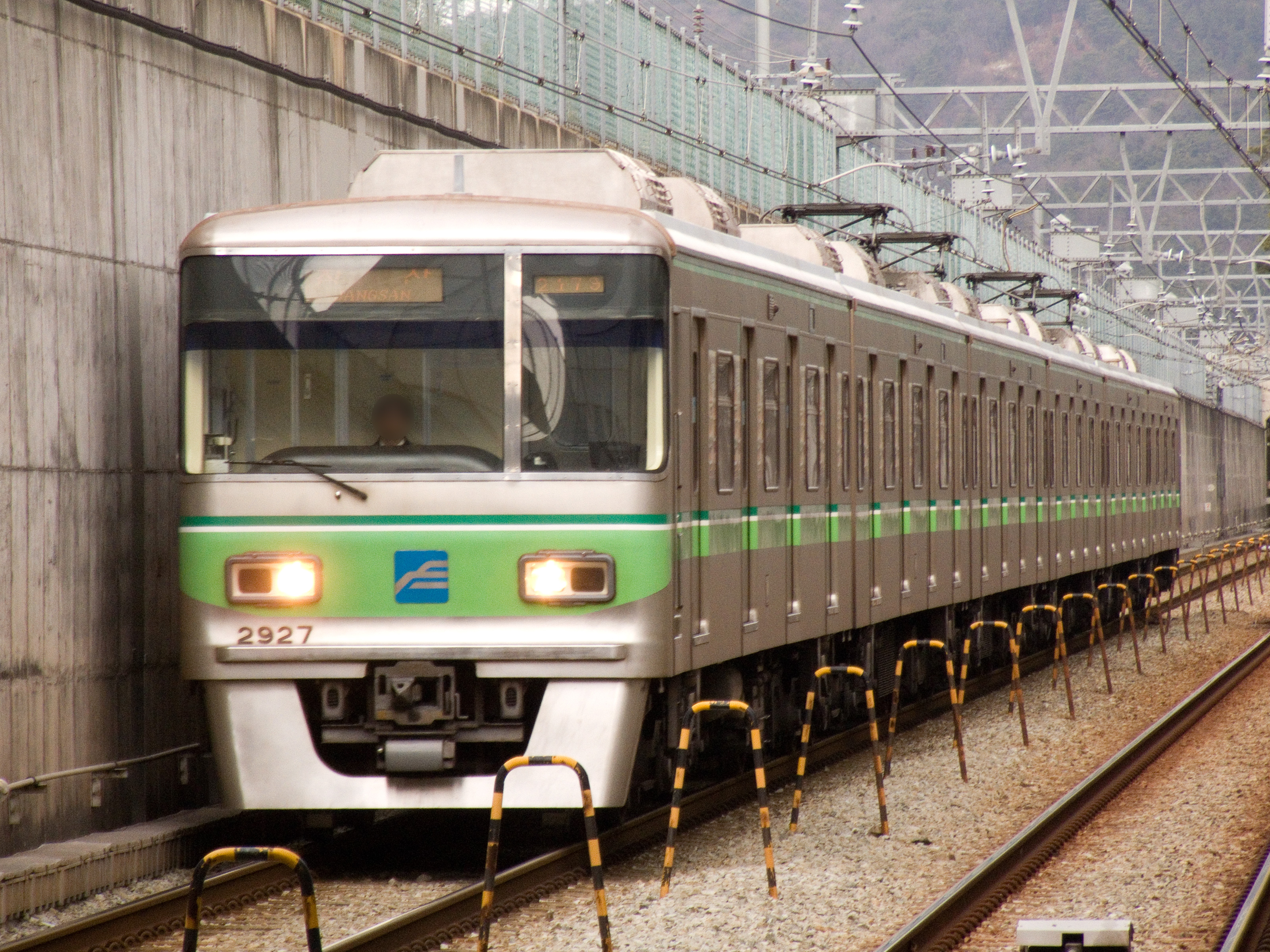
- Train on Busan Metro Line 2

Overview
- Owner: City of Busan
- Locale: Busan, South Korea
- Transit type: Rapid transit, Commuter rail
- Number of lines: 6
- Number of stations: 114 (metro only); 158 (incl. BGL, Donghae Line)
- Daily ridership: 938,000 (2019, metro only)
- Annual ridership: 343,000,000 (2019, metro only)

Operation
- Began operation: 19 July 1985; 41 years ago
- Operators: Busan Transportation Corporation; B&G Metro; Korail

Technical
- System length: 116.5 km (72.4 mi) (metro only); 205.6 km (127.8 mi) (incl. BGL, Donghae Line)
- Track gauge: 1,435 mm (4 ft 8 1/2 in) standard gauge
System map

- Busan Metro
- Hangul: 부산 도시철도
- Hanja: 釜山都市鐵道
- RR: Busan dosi cheoldo
- MR: Pusan tosi ch'ŏlto

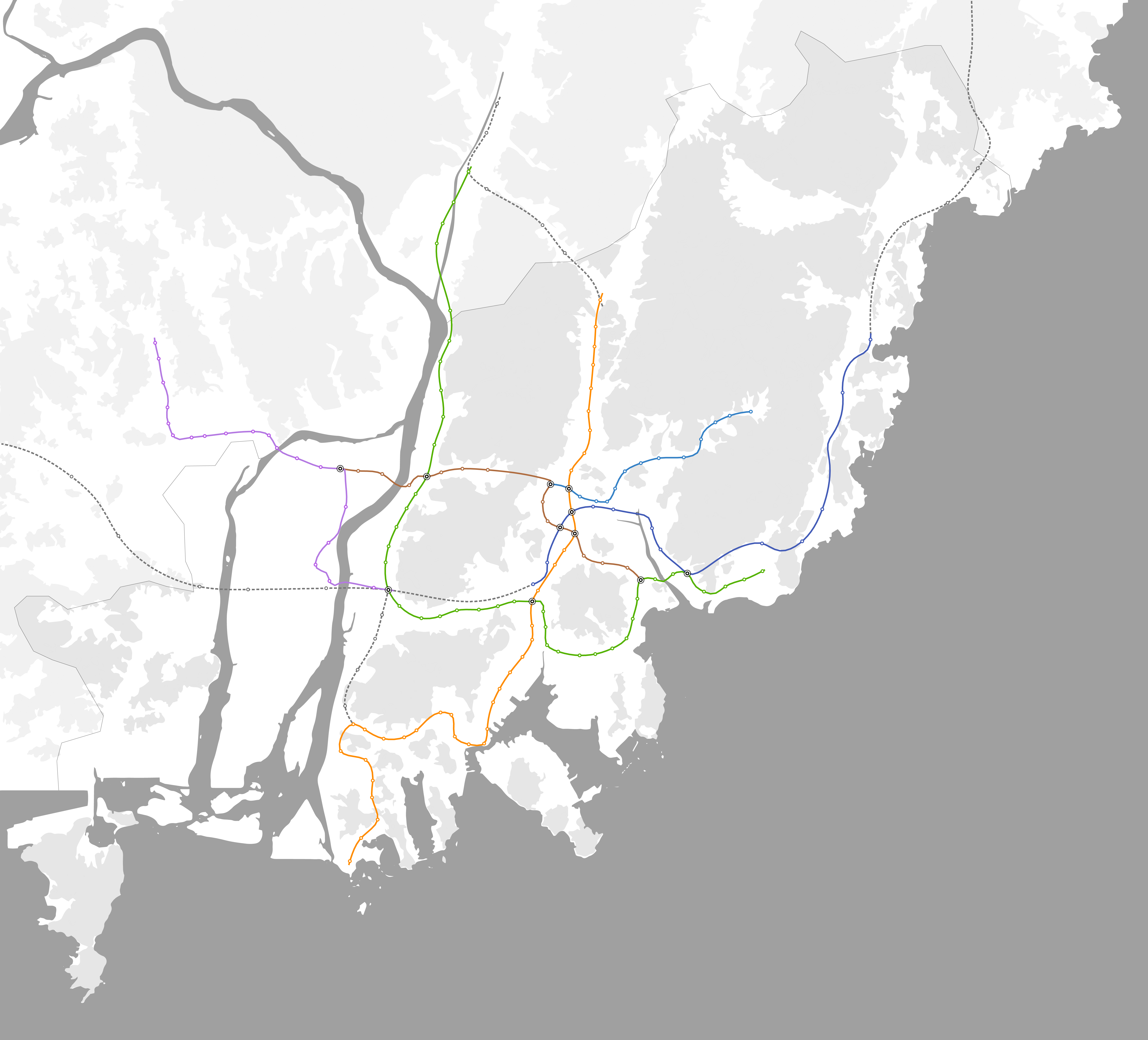
Geographically accurate map of Busan Metro

The Busan Metro (Korean: 부산 도시철도) is the urban rail system operated by the Busan Transportation Corporation of Busan, South Korea. The metro network first opened in 1985 with seventeen stations, making Busan the second city in South Korea and third in the Korean Peninsula (after Seoul and Pyongyang) to have a metro system. The Metro itself consists of 4 numbered lines, covering 116.5 kilometres (72.4 mi) of route and serving 114 stations. Including the BGL and the Donghae Line, the network covers 205.6 kilometres (127.8 mi) of route, serving 158 stations.

All directional signs on the Busan Metro are written in both Korean and English, and the voice announcement in the trains indicating the upcoming station, possible line transfer and exiting side are all spoken in Korean, followed by English. Station transfer announcements are first in Korean, followed by in English, then in Mandarin, and finally in Japanese. Announcements at stations for arriving trains are in Korean, followed by English, then Japanese and Mandarin. All stations are numbered and the first numeral of the number is the same as the line number, e.g. station 123 is on line 1.

The Metro map includes information on which station, and which numbered exit from that station, to use for main attractions. Photography in the Busan Metro is permitted.

== Lines ==
Operator	Line Name English	Line Name Korean	Starting Station	Ending Station	Opening Year	Last extension	Stations	Total Length
BTC	Line 1	1호선	Dadaepo Beach	Nopo	1985	2017	40	40.5 km
BTC	Line 2	2호선	Jangsan	Yangsan	1999	2008	43	45.2 km
BTC	Line 3	3호선	Suyeong	Daejeo	2005	-	17	18.1 km
BTC	Line 4	4호선	Minam	Anpyeong	2011	-	14	12.7 km
Subtotal							114	116.5 km
B&G Metro	Busan–Gimhae Light Rail Transit	부산-김해 경전철	Sasang	Kaya University	2011	-	21	23.4 km
	Donghae Line	동해선	Bujeon	Bugulsan	2016	2025	23	65.7 km
Grand Total							158	205.6 km

=== Line 1 ===
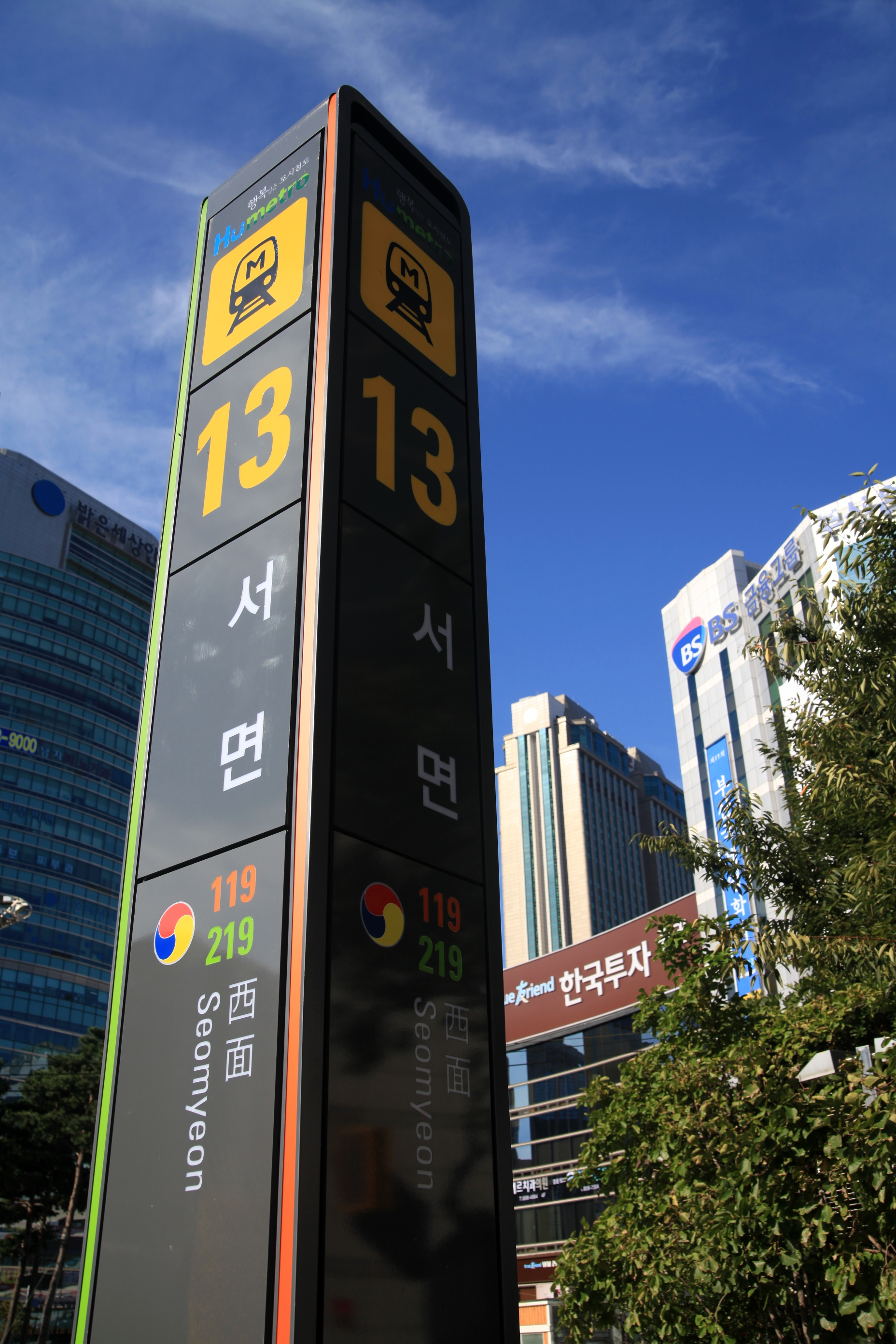
Sign outside Seomyeon station, the transfer station between Line 1 and Line 2

Busan Metro Line 1 (1호선) is the north-south route. It is 39.8-kilometre (24.7 mi) long with 40 stations. The line uses trains that have eight cars each. The total construction cost was 975.1 billion won.

Plans for this line were made in 1979. Two years later, in 1981, construction began on the first phase, between Nopo-Dong (now Nopo) and Beomnaegol, which was finished in July 1985. This stretch was 16.2-kilometre (10.1 mi) long. Further extensions continued southward: a 5.4-kilometre (3.4 mi) extension from Beomnaegol to Jungang-dong (now Jungang) opened in May 1987; a 4.5-kilometre (2.8 mi) extension to Seodaeshin-dong (now Seodaeshin) opened in February 1990; and a 6.4-kilometre (4.0 mi) extension to Shinpyeong opened in June 1994.

The extension of the line further into Saha District from Shinpyeong to Dadaepo Beach 7.3-kilometre (4.5 mi) was finished in mid-April 2017.

=== Line 2 ===
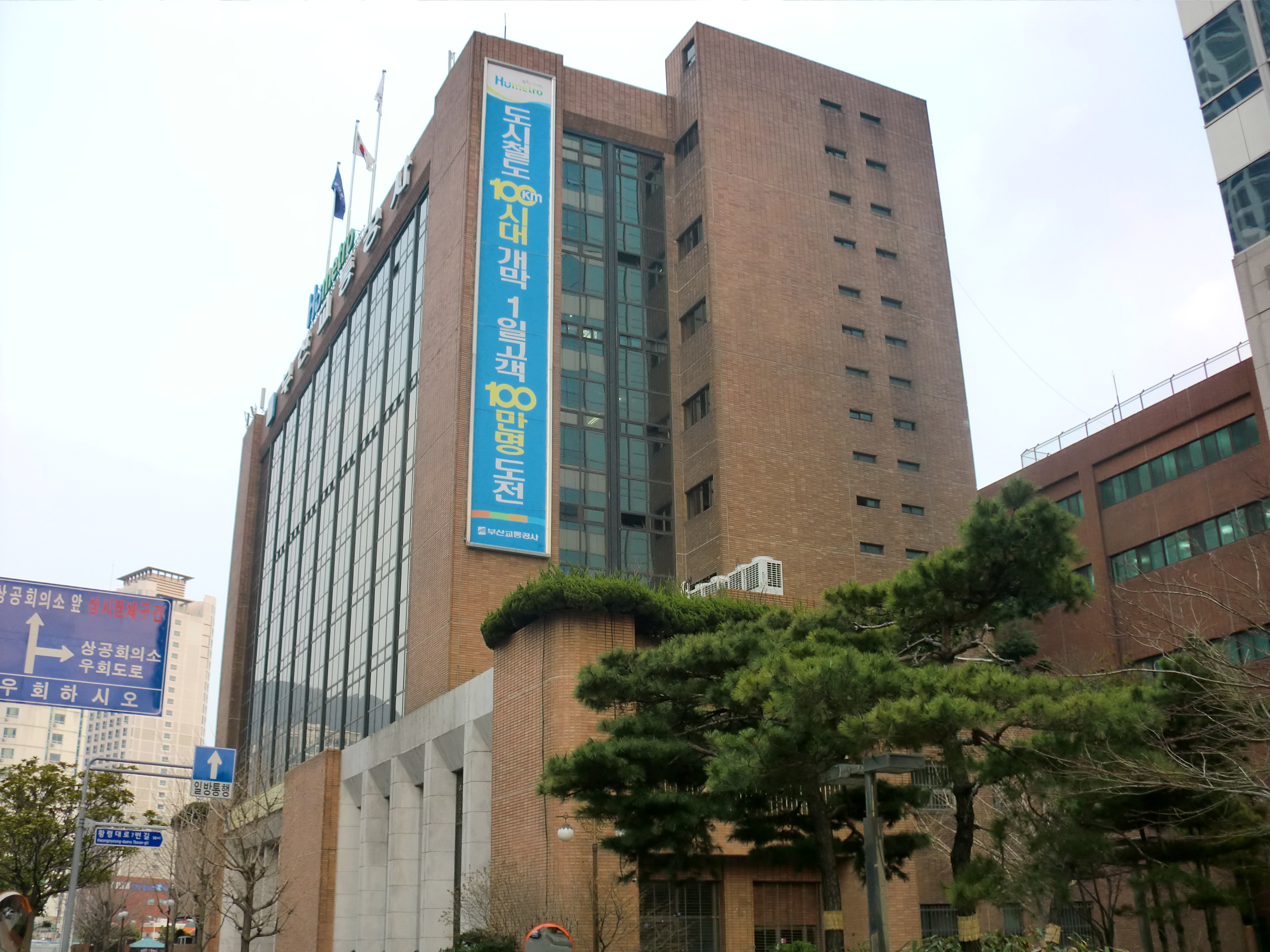
The headquarters of the Busan Transportation Corporation, the operator of Lines 1-4

Busan Metro Line 2 (2호선) crosses Busan from east to west, running along the shores of Haeundae and Gwangalli, and then north toward Yangsan. It is 46.0-kilometre (28.6 mi) long, serving 43 stations. The line uses trains that have six cars each.

Construction on the Phase 1 began in 1991. But this 21.7-kilometre (13.5 mi) route, serving 21 stations between Hopo and Seomyeon, did not open until 30 June 1999. With Phase 2 (planned to be 16.3 kilometres (10.1 mi) in total), the line was first extended 7.7 kilometres (4.8 mi) southeast from Seomyeon to Geumnyeonsan on 8 August 2001. The remainder of Phase 2 was implemented in two stages: Line 2 was extended 1.8 km (1.1 mi) north to Gwangan on January 16, 2002, and finally on 29 August 2002 it was extended 6.8 kilometres (4.2 mi) east to Jangsan.

Phase 3, started in 1998, extends Line 2 north from Hopo more into the city of Yangsan. The phase was originally supposed to add another 11.3 kilometres (7.0 mi) to the line, with an additional seven stations. On 10 January 2003, Line 2 was extended 8 kilometres (5.0 mi) to the current terminus of Yangsan, but with only three of the originally planned seven stations in operation. Pusan National University Yangsan Campus Station, which was the fourth station to open in Phase 3, opened on 1 October 2009. The city of Yangsan subsequently gave up on finishing the extension and building the last three stations.

In 2014, Munjeon station was renamed to Busan International Finance Center–Busan Bank station

An extension of Line 2 towards the eastern extremity of Haeundae District is planned. If this extension opens, then 4 new stations will be added to Line 2.

=== Line 3 ===
Busan Metro Line 3 (3호선) construction began in November 1997. Opening was delayed many times, but the Line 3 finally started service on 28 November 2005, with an 18.3-kilometre (11.4 mi) long stretch serving 17 stations. Line 3 uses 4-car trains. The first phase's estimated construction cost was 1,688.6 billion won, with the second phase split off into Line 4.

Following the "Daegu Subway Fire" in 2003, it was decided during construction to install screen doors to all station platforms on Line 3. This was one of the first lines in Korea and in the world that have screen doors installed in every station. Line 3 significantly improved the metro transportation system by connecting the Suyeong and Yeonsan-dong region, as well as the Yeonsan-dong and Deokcheon region.

=== Line 4 ===
Busan Metro Line 4, also called the Bansong Line, is a rubber-tyred metro system that serves north-central and northeastern Busan. The line was originally planned as an extension of Line 3. Using automated guideway transit technology and extending from Minam to Anpyeong, Line 4 includes 14 stations and 12.7 kilometres (7.9 mi) of route. Originally scheduled to open in 2008, the line opened on 30 March 2011. Of the 14 stations, 8 are underground, 1 is ground-level, and 5 are above-ground. Each train operates with 6 cars, though each car on Line 4 is significantly shorter than the cars used on the other lines in the Busan Metro system.

=== Busan-Gimhae LRT (BGL) ===
The Busan–Gimhae Light Rail Transit is a light metro system that connects the city of Busan to the neighboring city of Gimhae. The line opened on 9 September 2011. It is operated by B&G Metro. The line has 21 stations, including two stations, Daejeo and Sasang, where one can transfer to Line 3 and Line 2 respectively. The line serves as inner-city transit for both Busan and Gimhae, an inter-city network linking Gimhae and Busan, and a new way to get to Gimhae International Airport.

All of the 21 stations are above-ground, and each train has 2 cars.

=== Donghae Line ===
Railway line along the coast being upgraded for commuter service, with trains every 30 min (15 min peak), was extended to Taehwagang Station in Ulsan by 2021.

== Fares ==
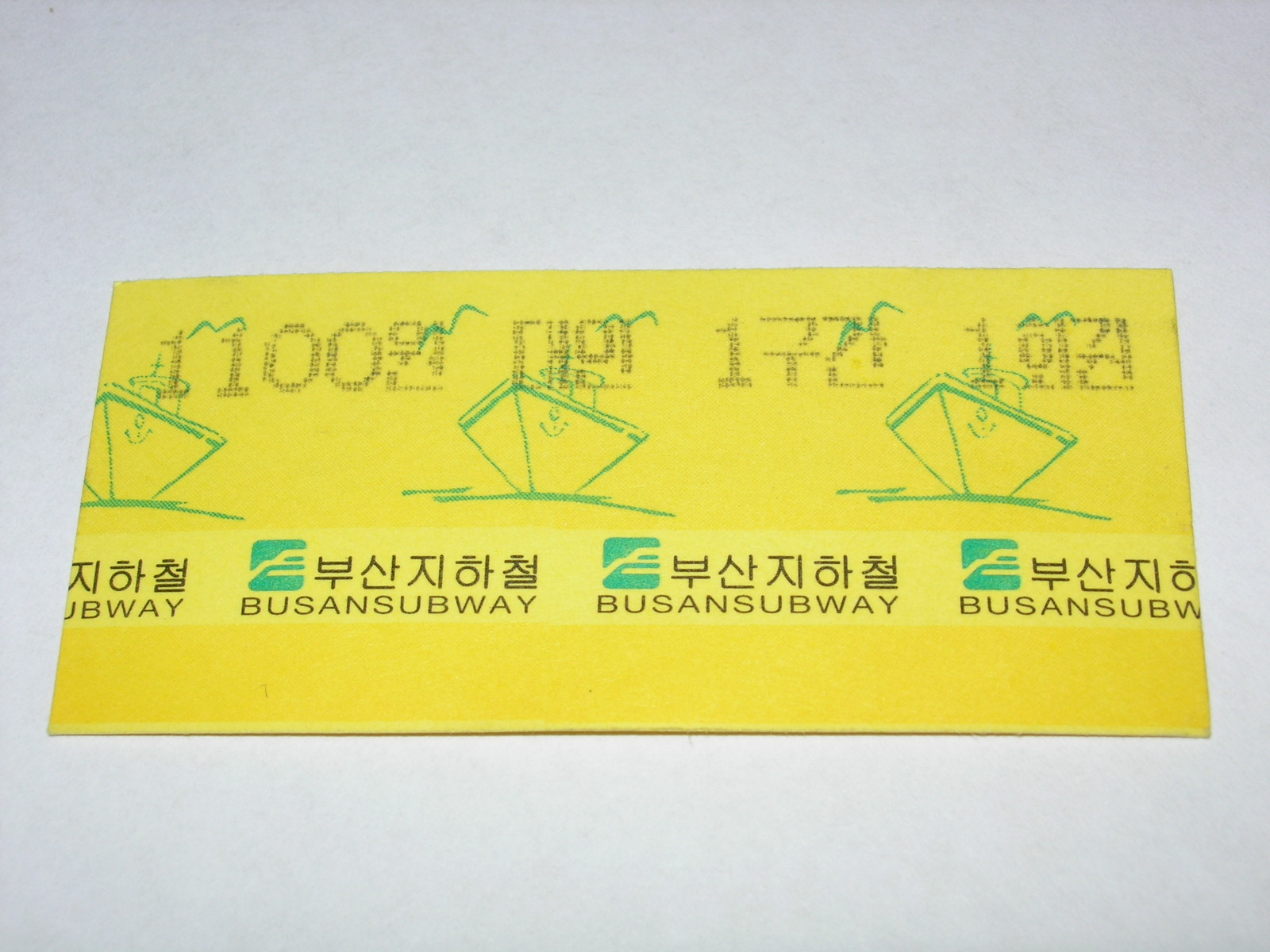
Busan Metro ticket

A single ride fare (as of 1 June 2014) is 1300 won for a destination within less than 10 km (6.2 mi) and 1500 won for any other destinations. Tickets are sold at ticket vending machines with most machines accepting 1000 won notes as well as coins. Tickets are to be kept since they are required to leave the station once reaching destination, and getting caught "jumping the gate" will result in a hefty fine.

The use of a metro pass, either a Hanaro Card (하나로카드) or a Digital Busan Card (디지털부산카드) will offer a fare discount of 10% to adults and 20% to youth of 13-18 of age. Both the Hanaro and the Digital Busan cards, are available in either card format or a more compact, yet slightly more expensive cell phone accessory format. The passes are equipped with a microchip and are scanned by laying them against sensor plates at the entrance and exit of stations. This makes them more efficient than magnetic stripe cards since they can be detected through a wallet or purse. Hanaro Cards are for sale at all stations for 2000 won. All type of passes can have credit added to them in any station at the "Automatic Charge Machine" (교통카드 자동 보충기); the instructions are available in both English and Korean. The passes can also be used to pay for bus fares and for purchases on specially equipped vending machines throughout the city.

== Proposed improvements and expansions ==
Busan Metro (Future)

- An upgrade to the Gyeongjeon Line is under construction, between Bujeon and Masan. The line will have a length of 50 km and 10 stations, and is planned to open in December 2022. As the service will be similar to the Donghae Line, with some characteristics of commuter rail, there are also proposals for these two sections to merge, with a Gyeongjeon-Donghae Line offering service from Masan in Changwon to Taehwagang in Ulsan, passing through Busan.
- The Donghae Line will be further extended from Taehwagang to Bugulsan, with the extension completed by September 2026.
- Busan Metro Line 5 is a light metro connecting Sasang and Hadan, which is planned for completion in December 2026. The line will have 7 stations and a length of 6.9 km. There are further plans for additional expansions to the line to the south-west.
- A light rail line (Yangsan Metro) that connects Nopo of Line 1 to Yangsan Sports Complex of Line 2 and ends further away in Yangsan is under construction. The line is expected to be completed by late 2026.
- Busan Metro Line 2 will be expanded from Jangsan Station to East Busan Tourism Complex in Gijang County by late 2026.

== DMB service ==
On May 25, 2006, TU Media started to serve the entire metro network with S-DMB service. The current S-DMB transmission allow subscriber to receive television and radio reception on hand-held device such as cell-phone. With an investment of 11 billion won TU Media installed 530 signal emitters to provide seamless reception in the entire underground system.

== See also ==
- Rapid transit in South Korea
- List of metro systems
