= Sasang station (Busan Metro) =

Station of the Busan Metro

227 1 사상 (서부터미널) Sasang (Seobu Bus Terminal)
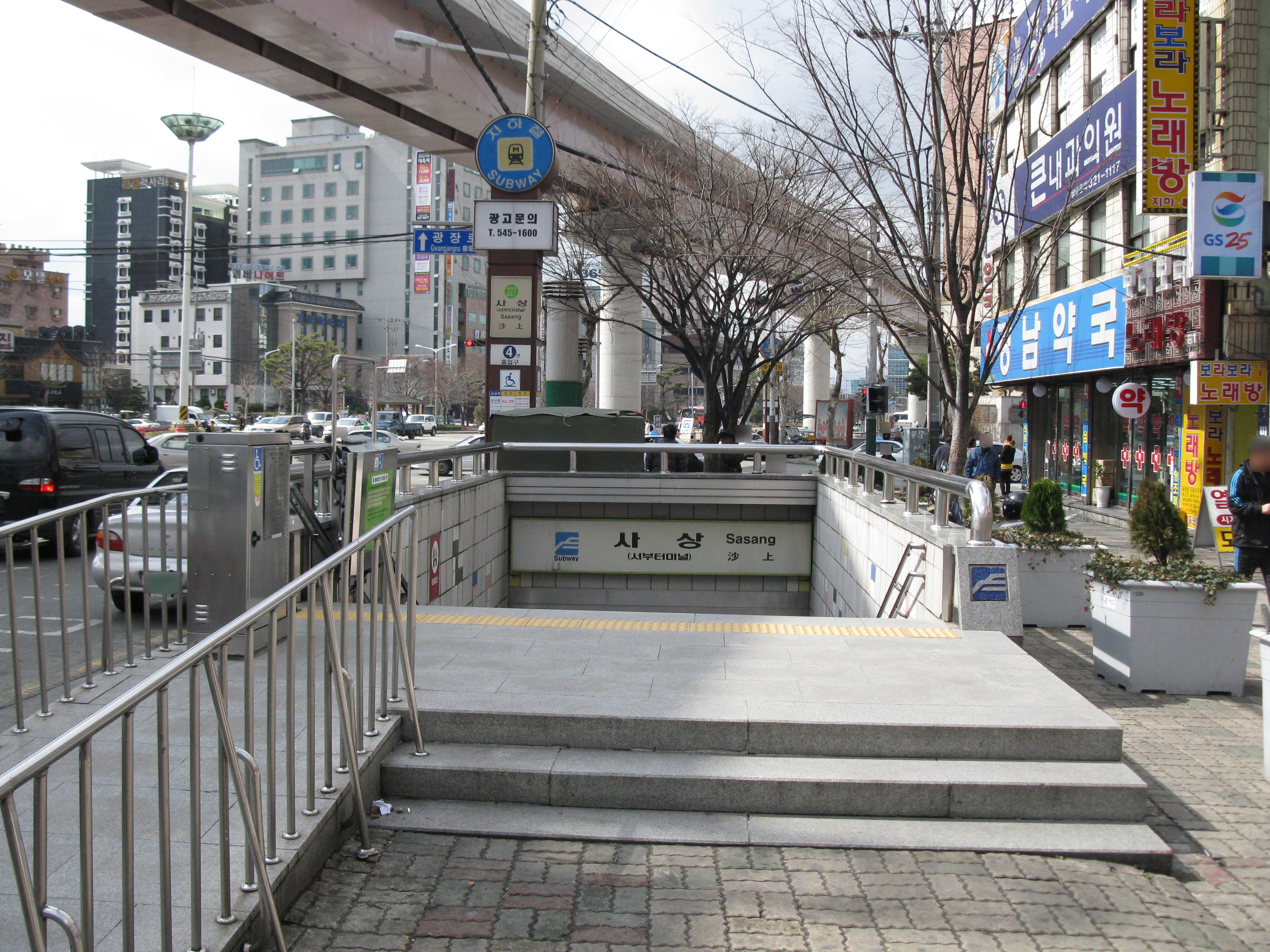
- Line 2 Station Entrance No. 4

General information
- Location: Gwaebeop-dong, Sasang District, Busan; South Korea
- Coordinates: 35°9′43.84″N 128°59′4.82″E
- Operator: Busan Transportation Corporation; Busan–Gimhae Light Rail Transit Operation Corporation
- Lines: Line 2 Busan–Gimhae Light Rail Transit
- Platforms: 2 (Line 2); 2 (BGL)
- Tracks: 2 (Line 2); 2 (BGL)

Construction
- Structure type: Underground (Line 2); Aboveground (BGL)
- Accessible: Yes

Other information
- Station code: 227 (Line 2); 1 (BGL)

History
- Opened: June 30, 1999; 27 years ago (Line 2); September 16, 2011; 15 years ago (BGL)

Services
Preceding station	Busan Metro	Following station
Gamjeon towards Jangsan	Line 2	Deokpo towards Yangsan
Terminus	Busan–Gimhae Light Rail Transit	Gwaebeop Renecite towards Kaya University
Location

Sasang Station is a station on the Busan Metro Line 2 and BGLRT Line located in Gwaebeop-dong, Sasang District; "Line 2 connects emerging sub-centers of Busan - including Deokcheon, Sasang," etc.

The sub-name of the Busan Metro is Seobu Bus Terminal. They connect directly underground via a department store.

The planned Busan Metro Line 5 (Sasang-Hadan Line) will connect to this station.

== Gallery ==
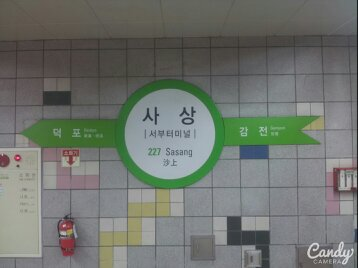
Station Sign (Line 2)

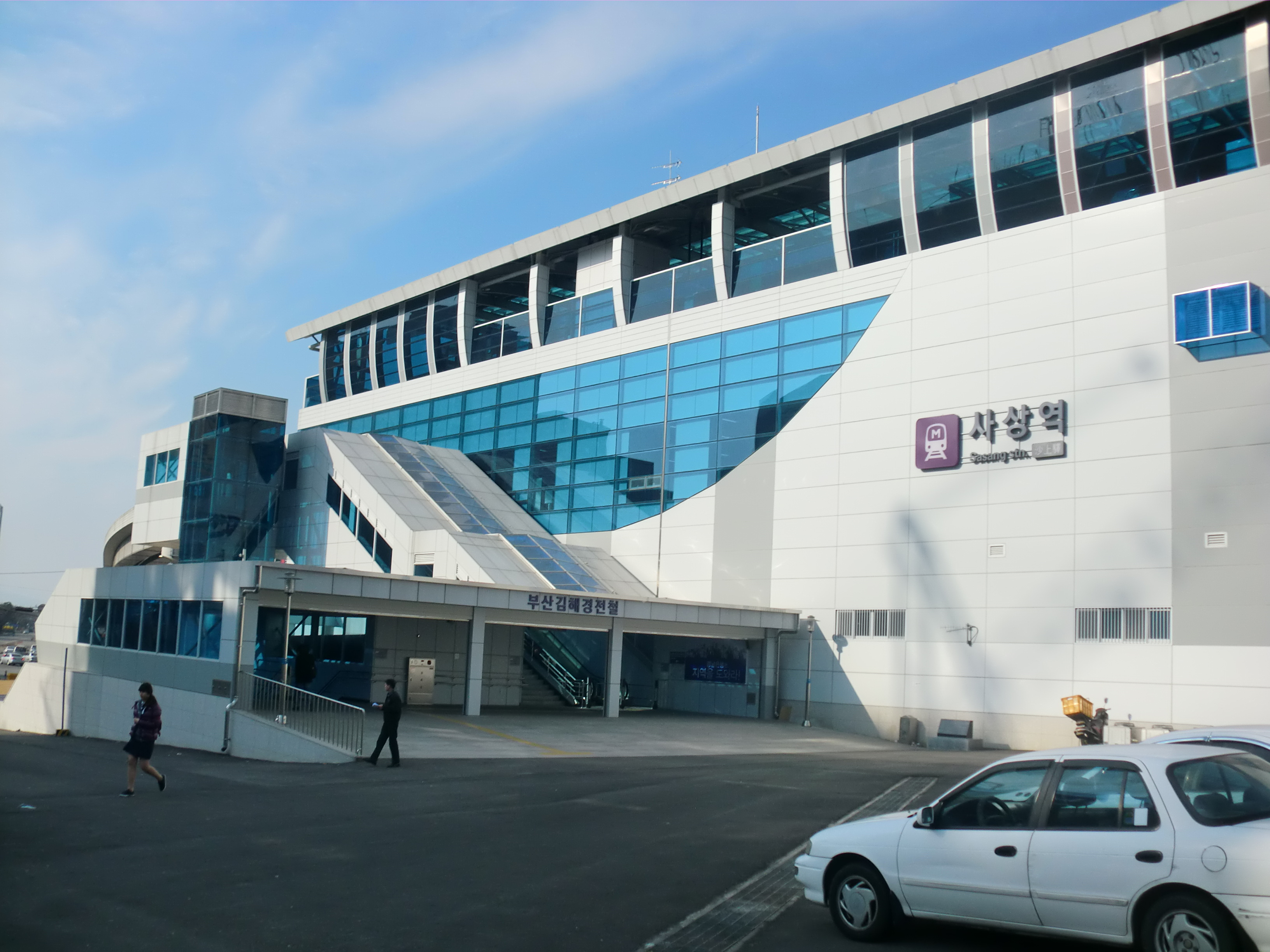
BGL station
