= Busan–Gimhae Light Rail Transit Operation Corporation =

Operator of Busan–Gimhae Light Rail Transit, South Korea

Busan-Gimhae Light Rail Transit Operation Corporation, Ltd.
- Native name: 부산김해경전철운영 주식회사
- Romanized name: Busan-Gimhae Gyeongjeoncheol Unyeong
- Type: Private
- Industry: Rapid transit
- Founded: Gimhae, South Korea (December 13, 2003)
- Founder: Hyundai Development Consortium
- Headquarters: Sinmyeong Train depot, Samgye-dong, Gimhae, South Gyeongsang, South Korea
- Area served: From Gimhae to Busan
- Website: www.bglrt.com/english.web

Busan–Gimhae Light Rail Transit Operation Corporation, also known as B&G Metro, is a private corporation which was established in 2003 to operate the Busan–Gimhae Light Rail Transit in Gimhae, South Gyeongsang, South Korea.

== See also ==
- Busan–Gimhae Light Rail Transit
