= City Hall (disambiguation) =

City Hall is the headquarters of a city or town's administration.

City Hall may also refer to:

== Locations ==
=== Bangladesh ===
- City Hall, Barishal
- City Hall, Bogura
- City Hall, Chattogram
- City Hall, Cumilla
- City Hall, Dhaka
- City Hall, Gazipur
- City Hall, Jashore
- City Hall, Khulna
- City Hall, Mymensigh
- City Hall, Narayanganj
- City Hall, Rajshahi
- City Hall, Rangpur
- City Hall, Sylhet

=== Ireland ===
- City Hall, Cork
- City Hall, Dublin
- City Hall, Galway
- City Hall, Limerick
- City Hall, Waterford

=== Netherlands ===
- City Hall (Delft)
- City Hall, Dordrecht
- City Hall, Groningen
- City Hall (Haarlem)
- City Hall, Kampen
- City Hall, Weesp

=== United Kingdom ===
- City Hall, Bradford, England
- City Hall, Bristol, England
- City Hall, Leicester, England
- City Hall, London (disambiguation)
- City Hall, London, headquarters of the Greater London Authority
- City Hall, Norwich, England
- City Hall, Sunderland, England
- City Hall, Cardiff, Wales
- City Hall, St Davids, Wales
- Belfast City Hall, Northern Ireland
- Hull City Hall, England
- Newcastle City Hall, a music venue in Newcastle upon Tyne, England
- Perth City Hall, Scotland
- Sheffield City Hall, a concert and event venue in Sheffield, England
- Westminster City Hall, England

=== United States ===
==== Arkansas ====
- City Hall (Osceola, Arkansas), listed on the NRHP in Arkansas

==== California ====
- Alameda City Hall, listed on the NRHP in Alameda County, California
- Old City Hall (Berkeley, California), listed on the NRHP in Alameda County, California
- City Hall (Hayward), California
- City Hall (Los Angeles), California
- Oakland City Hall, listed on the NRHP in Alameda County, California

==== Colorado ====
- City Hall (Leadville, Colorado), in National Historic Landmark Leadville Historic District

==== Georgia ====
- City Hall (Atlanta), Georgia
- City Hall (Macon, Georgia)

==== Hawaii ====
- City Hall (Honolulu), Hawaii

==== Illinois ====
- Chicago City Hall, Illinois

==== Indiana ====
- City Hall (Muncie, Indiana), listed on the NRHP in Indiana

==== Iowa ====
- City Hall (Mount Pleasant, Iowa), listed on the NRHP in Iowa

==== Kentucky ====
- City Hall (Somerset, Kentucky), listed on the NRHP in Pulaski County, Kentucky

==== Maryland ====
- City Hall (Baltimore), Maryland
- City Hall (Cumberland, Maryland), listed on the NRHP in Maryland

==== Massachusetts ====
- City Hall (Boston), Massachusetts
- City Hall (Cambridge, Massachusetts)
- City Hall (Chicopee, Massachusetts), listed on the NRHP in Massachusetts
- City Hall (Fall River, Massachusetts)
- City Hall (Salem, Massachusetts), listed on the NRHP in Massachusetts

==== Michigan ====
- City Hall (Bay City, Michigan), listed on the NRHP in Michigan
- City Hall (Detroit), Michigan

==== Minnesota ====
- City Hall (Cloquet), Minnesota

==== Mississippi ====
- Jackson City Hall, listed on the NRHP in Jackson, Mississippi

==== Missouri ====
- City Hall (Columbia, Missouri)
- City Hall (Forest City, Missouri), listed on the NRHP in Missouri
- City Hall (Kansas City), Missouri
- City Hall (St. Louis), Missouri
- City Hall (University City, Missouri), listed on the NRHP in Missouri

==== Montana ====
- City Hall (Anaconda, Montana), listed on the NRHP in Montana

==== Nebraska ====
- City Hall (Lincoln, Nebraska), listed on the NRHP in Nebraska

==== Nevada ====
- City Hall (Las Vegas), Nevada

==== New Hampshire ====
- City Hall (Manchester, New Hampshire)

==== New York (state) ====
- City Hall (Albany), New York
- City Hall (Buffalo), New York
- City Hall (Manhattan), listed on the NRHP in New York
- City Hall (Plattsburgh, New York), listed on the NRHP in New York

==== Ohio ====
- City Hall (Cincinnati), Ohio
- City Hall (Columbus, Ohio)
- City Hall (East Liverpool, Ohio), listed on the NRHP in Ohio

==== Oklahoma ====
- City Hall (Pawhuska, Oklahoma), listed on the NRHP in Oklahoma

==== Pennsylvania ====
- Philadelphia City Hall, Pennsylvania
- City Hall (Reading, Pennsylvania), listed on the NRHP in Pennsylvania
- City Hall (Williamsport, Pennsylvania)

==== Texas ====
- City Hall (Dallas), Texas
- City Hall (Galveston, Texas), listed on the NRHP in Galveston County, Texas
- City Hall (Houston), Texas

==== Virginia ====
- Old City Hall (Richmond, Virginia), listed on the NRHP in Richmond, Virginia

==== Washington (state) ====
- City Hall (Port Townsend, Washington), listed on the NRHP in Jefferson County, Washington

==== Washington, D.C. ====
- City Hall (Washington, D. C.), listed on the NRHP in Washington, D.C.

==== Wisconsin ====
- City Hall (Eau Claire, Wisconsin), listed on the NRHP in Eau Claire County, Wisconsin

==== Wyoming ====
- City Hall (Rock Springs, Wyoming), listed on the NRHP in Wyoming

=== Elsewhere ===
- City Hall (Oranjestad), Aruba
- City Hall (Edmonton), Canada
- Toronto City Hall, Toronto, Canada
- City hall (Hong Kong)
- City Hall, Helsinki, Finland
- City Hall (Kecskemét), Hungary
- City Hall, George Town, Malaysia
- City Hall, Lagos, Nigeria
- City Hall, Singapore, a 1929 national monument in the Central Business District of Singapore
- City Hall, Ljubljana, Slovenia

== Other uses ==
- City Hall (1996 film), a suspense drama film directed by Harold Becker starring Al Pacino and John Cusack
- City Hall (2020 film), a documentary film about the government in Boston, Massachusetts
- The City Hall (TV series), a 2009 South Korean television series
- "City Hall", a song by Tenacious D from their 2001 album Tenacious D
- "City Hall", a song by The Fray from their 2007 album Reason EP
- "City Hall", a song by singer-songwriter Vienna Teng from her 2006 album Dreaming Through the Noise
- "City Hall", a song by Irving Berlin (1932–1936)

== See also ==
- List of city and town halls
- City Hall Station (disambiguation)
- The City Hall Square (disambiguation)
- Town Hall (disambiguation)
