= Hall Station =

Hall Station may refer to:

- Hall Station, Colorado
- Hall Station, West Virginia

== See also ==
- City Hall Station (disambiguation)
