= Town Hall (disambiguation) =

A town hall is the headquarters of a town or city's administration.

Town Hall may also refer to:

== Australia ==
- Adelaide Town Hall, South Australia
- Melbourne Town Hall, Victoria
- Perth Town Hall, Western Australia
- St Kilda Town Hall, Melbourne
- Town Hall railway station, Melbourne
- Sydney Town Hall, New South Wales
- Town Hall railway station, Sydney

== Brazil ==
- Town Hall (Santo Amaro), Bahia

== Estonia ==
- Tallinn Town Hall

== India ==
- Town Hall, Coimbatore, Tamil Nadu
- Town Hall, Mangalore, Karnataka
- Bangalore Town Hall, Karnataka
- C V Rangacharlu Memorial Hall or Mysore Town Hall, Karnataka

== Lithuania ==
- Town Hall, Kaunas
- Town Hall, Vilnius

== Malaysia ==
- Town Hall, Penang, George Town

== Netherlands ==
- Town Hall, De Rijp

== Poland ==
- Town Hall (Orneta), Warmia

== Sri Lanka ==
- Town Hall, Colombo

== United Kingdom ==
- Birmingham Town Hall, England

- Town Hall tram stop, Birmingham

- Brighton Town Hall, England
- Cowbridge Town Hall, Wales
- Hove Town Hall, England
- Leeds Town Hall, England
- Liverpool Town Hall, England
- Manchester Town Hall, England
- Sheffield Town Hall, England
- Sutton Coldfield Town Hall, Birmingham, England

== United States ==
- Town Hall Arts Center, Littleton, Colorado
- Town Hall (Westport, Connecticut), a former town hall
- Town Hall (Castle Hall), Zionsville, Indiana
- Town Hall (Lakeville, Massachusetts)
- Town Hall (Sandwich, New Hampshire)
- The Town Hall (New York City), a performing arts venue
- Town Hall Seattle, a performance space in Seattle, Washington

== Other uses ==
- "Town Hall" (Superstore), a 2018 television episode
- Town Hall, 1962, a 1965 album by Ornette Coleman
- Town Hall 1972, a 1972 album by Anthony Braxton
- Townhall, an American politically conservative website
- TownHall, an Ohio restaurant chain owned by Cleveland businessman Bobby George

== See also ==
- Town Hall Theatre (disambiguation)
- Town hall meeting, a US term for a reception where local and national politicians meet with their constituents
- City Hall (disambiguation)
