= Zionsville Community High School =

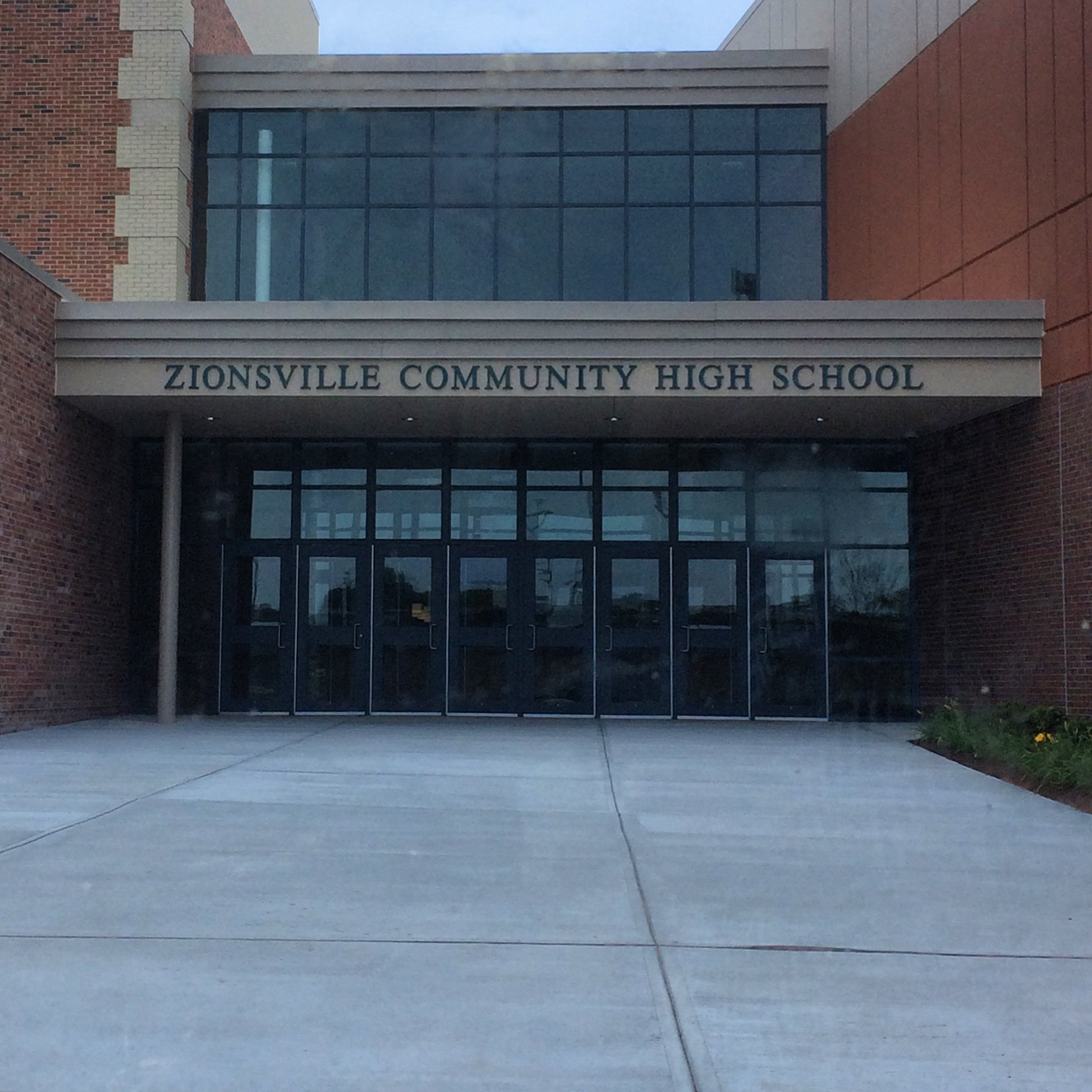
- View of the new ZCHS main entrance circa 2015

Location
- 1000 Mulberry Street; Zionsville, Indiana 46077; United States; 39°57′39″N 86°16′22″W

Information
- Type: Public high school
- Established: 1885; 141 years ago
- School district: Zionsville Community Schools
- NCES District ID: 1802830
- Superintendent: Rebecca Coffman
- CEEB code: 153900
- NCES School ID: 180283000341
- Principal: Karen McDaniel
- Teaching staff: 123.81 (on an FTE basis)
- Grades: 9-12
- Enrollment: 2,338 (2024–2025)
- Student to teacher ratio: 18.88
- Colors: Forest Green and Silver
- Athletics conference: Hoosier Crossroads Conference
- Nickname: Eagles
- Newspaper: Harbinger
- Yearbook: Aerie
- Website: School website

Zionsville Community High School (ZCHS) is a 4-year public high school located in Zionsville, Indiana, United States. It is the only high school in the Zionsville Community School Corporation.

The district includes large portions of Zionsville and a small portion of Whitestown.

== History ==
The high school was established in 1885 and graduated its first class in 1888. At that time it was located in the second-floor chapel of "The Academy", a small, brick, school house built in 1867 on Walnut Hill. Today, that site is the home of Hussey-Mayfield Memorial Public Library. In 1910, it was commissioned as Eagle Township High School. The Chapel building was torn down in 1922 and replaced in 1924. The gymnasium was finished in 1925.

The school remained at that location until 1968 when the first section of the current building was constructed on Whitestown Road, although some residents raised concern that the school did not include a gymnasium. In 1970, the name was changed to Zionsville Community High School, when a new school corporation, Eagle-Union Community School Corporation, was formed by the merger of Eagle and Union township schools. The old Eagle Township High School buildings were torn down in 1978, with the exception of the gymnasium. Called the "Nest", the school continued to use it as the home court of the basketball teams until 1998, when a gym on the new campus opened.

In 2003, the new performing arts center opened, and the freshman center and aquatics center opened in 2005. At the end of the 2009 football season, the original football stadium was torn down and a new multi-purpose stadium opened in 2010.

== Extracurricular activities ==
ZCHS has two competitive show choirs, the mixed-gender "Royalaires" and the all-female "Choralaires". Both Royalaires and Choralaires have won regional-level competitions in their respective divisions, and Choralaires won their division in all four of their 2016 competitions.

=== State championships ===
Indiana High School Athletic Association state championships:

Year	Sport
1987	Football AAA
1996	Football AAA
2002	Boys' Golf
2004	Boys' Golf
2009	Boys' Soccer
2017	Girls' Golf
2017	Girls' Cross Country
2019	Boys' Soccer (3A)
2024	Boys' Golf
2024	Girls' Golf

Indiana Percussion Association state championships:

Year	Class
2015	PSA
2016	PSA
2017	PSA
2021	PSO
2023	PSO

Indiana State School Music Association state championships:

Year	Class
2016	SA
2025	SA

In addition, the school's Quiz Bowl team won the Indiana State Quiz Bowl tournament in 2010 and 2011, as well as the National Academic Championship in 2010 and 2017.

== Notable alumni ==
- Bill Hodges (1961), college basketball coach
- Philip M. Bilden (1982), businessman
- Brad Stevens (1995), President of the Boston Celtics, former NBA and college basketball coach
- Kelly Williamson (1996) Triathlete
- Tom Mastny (1999), MLB pitcher
- Brian Mason (2005), special teams coach for the Indianapolis Colts
- Cory Miller (2006), soccer player
- Kendall Phillips (2007), singer
- Nathan Sprenkel (2009), soccer player
- A. J. Corrado (2010), soccer player
- Dylan Mares (2010), soccer player
- Parker Dunshee (2013), pitcher for the Washington Nationals
- Annika Creel (2015), soccer player
- Jacob Hurtubise (2016), outfielder for the Seattle Mariners
- Gus Hartwig (2020), center for the New York Jets

== See also ==
- List of high schools in Indiana
