= Parker Dunshee =

American baseball player (born 1995)

Free agent
- Pitcher
- Born: February 12, 1995 (age 31); Zionsville, Indiana, U.S.
- Bats: Right Throws: Right

MLB debut
- August 8, 2024, for the Atlanta Braves

MLB statistics (through 2024 season)
- Win–loss record: 0–0
- Earned run average: 19.29
- Strikeouts: 3
- Stats at Baseball Reference

Teams
- Atlanta Braves (2024)

Parker Edward Dunshee (born February 12, 1995) is an American professional baseball pitcher who is a free agent. He has previously played in Major League Baseball (MLB) for the Atlanta Braves.

== Amateur career ==
Dunshee attended Zionsville Community High School in Zionsville, Indiana, where he played baseball, basketball, and football. Undrafted out of high school in the 2013 Major League Baseball (MLB) draft, he enrolled at Wake Forest University where he played college baseball for the Wake Forest Demon Deacons.

In 2014, as a freshman at Wake Forest, he appeared in 27 games in relief, going 4–1 with a 2.17 ERA. As a sophomore in 2015, he went 5–3 with a 2.89 ERA in 71 2/3 innings which were split between starting, closing, and long relief. After the 2015 season, he played collegiate summer baseball with the Chatham Anglers of the Cape Cod Baseball League, and was named a league all-star. In 2016, Dunshee's junior year, he pitched to a 10–5 record with a 3.20 ERA in 16 games (15 starts). After his junior year, he was drafted in the 14th round of the 2016 Major League Baseball draft by the Chicago Cubs. However, he did not sign and chose to return to Wake Forest for his senior year. During his senior year, he started 17 games and went 9–1 with a 3.91 ERA, helping lead Wake Forest to their first super regional appearance since 1999. After his senior year, Dunshee was drafted by the Oakland Athletics in the seventh round of the 2017 Major League Baseball draft.

== Professional career ==
=== Oakland Athletics ===
Dunshee signed with Oakland and made his professional debut with the Rookie-level Arizona League Athletics where he pitched in one game before being promoted to the Vermont Lake Monsters of the Low–A New York-Penn League, where he was named an All-Star. In 38 1/3 innings pitched for Vermont, he did not allow a run. In 2018, he began with the Stockton Ports of the High–A California League and was named an All-Star before being promoted to the Midland RockHounds of the Double–A Texas League in June. In 24 games (22 starts) between the two clubs, he went 13–6 with a 2.33 ERA and a 1.00 WHIP. To begin the 2019 season, he returned to Midland before he was promoted to the Las Vegas Aviators of the Triple–A Pacific Coast League in May. Over 26 games (25 starts) between the two clubs, Dunshee pitched to a 6–7 record with a 4.36 ERA, striking out 124 over 130 innings. After the season, he was selected for the United States national baseball team in the 2019 WBSC Premier 12. Over two starts, he compiled a 1.59 ERA covering 5 2/3 innings.

Dunshee did not play a minor league game in 2020 due to the cancellation of the minor league season caused by the COVID-19 pandemic. To begin the 2021 season, he returned to the Aviators, now members the Triple-A West. After five starts, he was placed on the injured list with a collarbone injury. He was activated in early September. Over ten games (nine starts) with the Aviators for the 2021 season, Dunshee went 1–5 with a 6.65 ERA and 38 strikeouts over 43 1/3 innings.

Dunshee returned to Las Vegas for the 2022 season. Over 31 games (twenty starts), he went 5–11 with a 9.22 ERA and 92 strikeouts in 111 1/3 innings and led the minors in home runs allowed with 38. He made one appearance for Las Vegas in 2023, allowing two runs in an inning of work before he was released on April 14, 2023.

=== San Francisco Giants ===
On April 24, 2023, Dunshee signed a minor league contract with the San Francisco Giants organization. He split the season between the Double–A Richmond Flying Squirrels and Triple–A Sacramento River Cats. In 23 games for Richmond, he logged a 2.56 ERA with 22 strikeouts; in 10 games for Sacramento, he posted a 3.93 ERA with 10 strikeouts. Dunshee elected free agency following the season on November 6.

=== Atlanta Braves ===
On January 31, 2024, Dunshee signed a minor league contract with the Atlanta Braves. In 27 appearances split between the Double–A Mississippi Braves and Triple–A Gwinnett Stripers, he accumulated a 2.30 ERA with 66 strikeouts and 4 saves across 47 innings pitched. On August 8, Dunshee was selected to the 40-man roster and promoted to the major leagues for the first time. He debuted that day against the Milwaukee Brewers, allowing five runs with three strikeouts in 2 1/3 innings. Dunshee was designated for assignment by the Braves on August 14. He cleared waivers and was sent outright to Gwinnett on August 16. Dunshee elected free agency following the season on November 4.

=== Toros de Tijuana ===
On April 23, 2025, Dunshee signed with the Toros de Tijuana of the Mexican League. In two appearances for the team, he struggled to a 67.50 ERA with two strikeouts over 2/3 of an inning. Dunshee was released by Tijuana on May 3.

=== Washington Nationals ===
On May 6, 2025, Dunshee signed a minor league contract with the Washington Nationals and was assigned to the Triple-A Rochester Red Wings. In 33 appearances out of the bullpen for Rochester, he registered a 2–5 record and 5.12 ERA with 33 strikeouts across 38 2/3 innings pitched. Dunshee elected free agency following the season on November 6.
