= Stadhuis RandstadRail station =

Stadhuis RandstadRail station refers to two homonymous stations in the RandstadRail network:

- Stadhuis metro station (Rotterdam), operated by RET and served by metro line E.
- Stadhuis RandstadRail station (Zoetermeer), operated by HTM and served by lines 3, 4 and 34.

== See also ==
- City Hall Station (disambiguation)
