= Town Hall Square =

Town Hall Square may refer to:

== Australia ==
- Town Hall Square, a proposed town square in Sydney

== Austria ==
- Rathausplatz, Vienna

== Canada ==
- Yorkville Town Hall Square, Toronto

== Denmark ==
- City Hall Square, Copenhagen (Danish: Rådhuspladsen)

== Estonia ==
- Raekoja plats, Tallinn
- Raekoja plats, Tartu

== Lithuania ==
- Kaunas Town Hall Square
- Town Hall Square of Vilnius

== Norway ==
- Rådhusplassen, in Oslo

== See also ==
- Town Hall Square Historic District, Sandwich, Massachusetts
- City Hall Square (disambiguation)
