= City Hall Square =

City Hall Square is the name of these places:

- City Hall Square, Copenhagen, a central square in the capital of Denmark
- The City Hall Square, Oslo, a central square in the capital of Norway
- City Hall Square, Pamplona-Iruña, a central square in the capital of Navarre

== See also ==
- City square (disambiguation)
- City Hall (disambiguation)
- Town Hall Square (disambiguation)
