= Philip Bilden =

American businessman (born 1964)

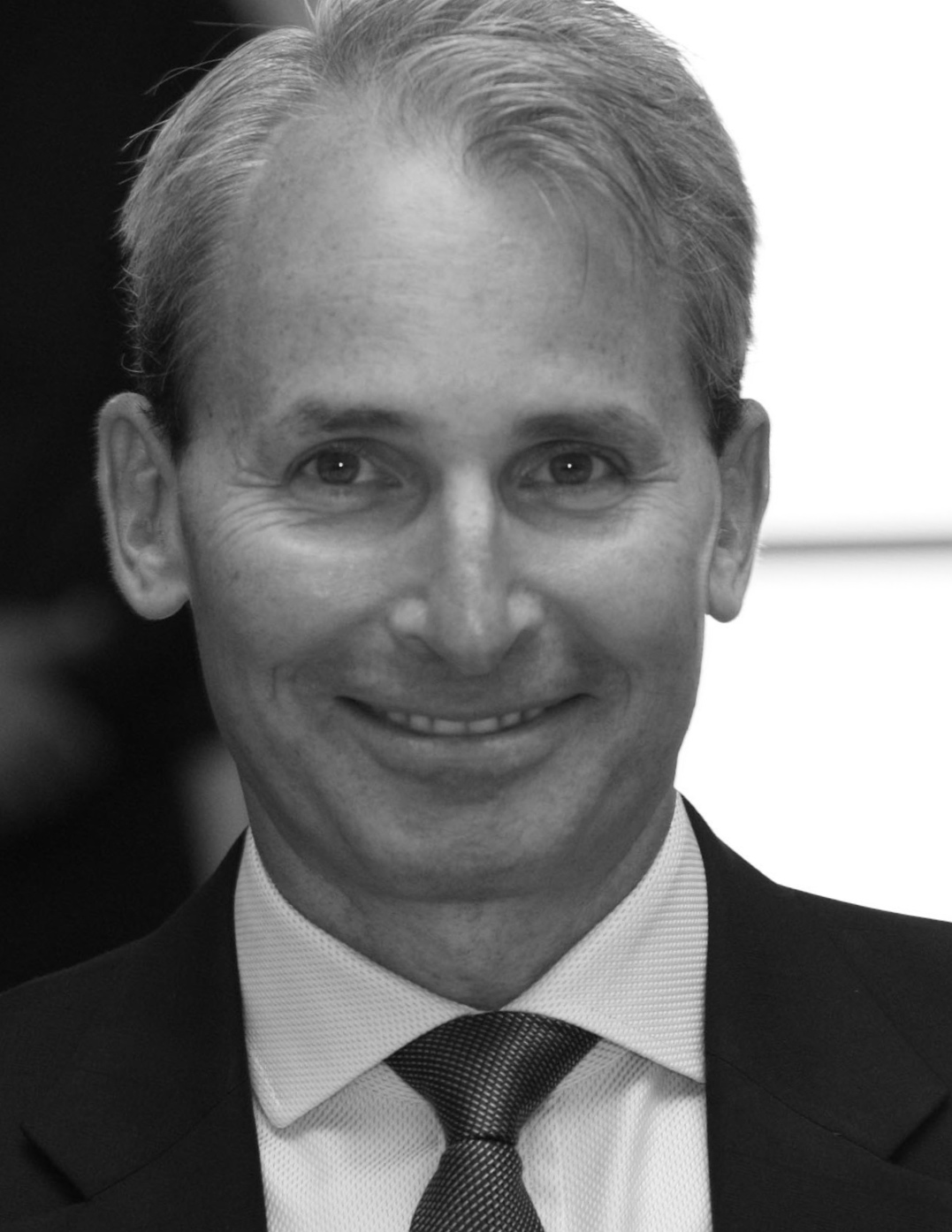

Personal details
- Born: 1964 (age 61–62) United States
- Party: Republican
- Education: Georgetown University (BS); Harvard University (MBA)

Military service
- Allegiance: United States
- Branch/service: United States Army
- Years of service: 1986–1996
- Rank: Captain
- Unit: Defense Intelligence Agency

Philip M. Bilden (born 1964) is an American businessman and private equity & venture capital investor. He was nominated by President Donald Trump to serve as the 76th United States Secretary of the Navy in January, 2017, although he subsequently withdrew himself from consideration. He is a philanthropist and advocate for national security, the U.S. Navy, and cybersecurity. He is the founder and managing partner of Shield Capital, a venture capital firm focused on technologies at the nexus of national security including cybersecurity, autonomy, space, and artificial intelligence.

== Early life and education ==
Philip M. Bilden was born in 1964, the son of a Navy officer with numerous duty stations across the United States. He attended eight American public primary and secondary schools in five states. Bilden lived in Zionsville, Indiana, graduating from Zionsville Community High School in 1982. He was class valedictorian. He was awarded both Army ROTC and Navy ROTC scholarships and opted for the Army scholarship when he enrolled at Georgetown University. Bilden graduated with a Bachelor of Science in Foreign Service, magna cum laude, in 1986 with a concentration in International Politics focused in Soviet Bloc studies and a proficiency in Spanish. He received Georgetown's W. Coleman Nevils Award for U.S. Diplomatic History for his thesis, "Alfred Thayer Mahan's Theory of Sea Power". He graduated as a Distinguished Military Graduate, United States Army Reserve Officers' Training Corps, where he was awarded the President's Cup as the top graduate of the Georgetown Army ROTC brigade. He received his MBA from Harvard Business School in 1991.

== Military service ==
From 1986 to 1996, Bilden served in the U.S. Army Reserve as a military intelligence officer. He was commissioned as a Second Lieutenant and served through the rank of Captain at Strategic Military Intelligence Detachments supporting the Defense Intelligence Agency. He resigned his commission in 1996 upon relocating to Hong Kong. Bilden is the third of seven men in his family to have served over four consecutive generations in the U.S. Navy and U.S. Army since World War II.

== Business leadership and career ==
Bilden is Founder and Managing Partner of Shield Capital, a venture capital firm at the nexus of national security and commercial technology with over $500 million in assets. Bilden oversees all aspects of the firm's governance, investment strategy, fiduciary fund management, capital formation, operations, and administration. Since founding Shield Capital in 2021, Bilden has led the firm's venture capital investment strategy investing into early stage companies with advanced technologies that strengthen U.S. and allied defense capabilities. Shield Capital operates in strategic partnership with aerospace & defense company, L3 Harris Technologies (NYSE: LHX), to pursue early stage investments in dual-use defense and commercial technologies including cybersecurity, artificial intelligence, autonomy, and space intelligence, surveillance, and reconnaissance (ISR). Bilden serves on the Board of Directors of Shield Capital portfolio companies including Seasats, GoSecure, and Authentic8.

Bilden was a co-founding member of the private equity firm HarbourVest Partners, which manages over $150 billion in assets. He began his career in Boston in 1991 and relocated to Hong Kong in 1996 to establish the firm's Asian subsidiary. Bilden was responsible for the firm's investment strategy and execution, capital raising, and client service activities throughout the Asia Pacific region, managing personnel and partnerships in multiple countries and cultures. Throughout his 25-year tenure at HarbourVest Partners, Bilden served in senior leadership roles in the firm's global management, including the firm's six person executive committee responsible for governance. He became a founding member of the firm following the management buyout of HarbourVest's predecessor company in 1997. He became a senior advisor of HarbourVest in January 2012. After 25 years at the firm, Bilden retired in 2016.

Bilden served on the advisory boards of several international private equity partnerships, including funds managed by Archer Capital (Australia), Bain Capital Asia, Brait Capital Partners (South Africa), Castle Harlan Australian Mezzanine Partners (CHAMP), KKR Asia, Latin American Enterprise Fund, Olympus Capital (Asia), Pacific Equity Partners (Australia), TPG Asia, and Unitas Capital (Asia). Bilden served as inaugural Chairman of the Emerging Markets Private Equity Association 2011–2012.

Bilden was awarded the Asia Venture Capital Journal Special Achievement award for "outstanding contribution to private equity in the region" upon completion of his 15th year managing the firm's Asia business. He was named among "Asia's 25 Most Influential People in Private Equity" by Asian Investor.

Bilden has held numerous advisory board and governance positions across industry and national-security institutions. He served as a director of Huntington Ingalls Industries (NYSE: HII), the largest U.S. military shipbuilder, from 2017 to 2022, including as Chairman of HII's Cybersecurity Committee. He served as Chairman and Vice Chairman of the Naval War College Foundation from 2018 to 2023, subsequently becoming Chairman Emeritus, and previously formed and led its Cyber Task Force. He served on the Chief of Naval Operations Executive Panel and has been involved in advisory roles for organizations such as the U.S. Naval Academy Foundation, the U.S. Naval Institute, and academic boards at Georgetown University's School of Foreign Service and Harvard Business School.

== Secretary of the Navy nomination ==
On January 25, 2017, President Trump announced his intention to nominate Bilden to be the United States Secretary of the Navy. Bilden announced his decision to respectfully withdraw from consideration as 76th Secretary of the Navy in a statement issued by the Pentagon on February 26, 2017, noting his inability to serve without materially adverse financial divestiture of private family assets. Bilden outlined key challenges facing the 76th Secretary of the Navy due to a decade of budgetary disinvestment and the increasingly complex security environment facing the U.S. Navy. Bilden advised the next Secretary of the Navy to take urgent action to reverse the Navy and Marine Corps readiness and modernization deficit, develop a strategic plan for the fleet of the future, and partner with the Congress and industry to develop a multi-year procurement plan.

== National security and cybersecurity advocacy & philanthropy ==
Bilden has served on several boards of public policy, non-profit, educational, and philanthropic organizations supporting military veterans, national and regional security, and cybersecurity missions. He previously served as Chairman of the Board of Trustees of the Naval War College Foundation, where he also served as Vice Chairman and as the inaugural Chairman of the Center for Cyber Conflict Studies and the Cyber & Tech Council of Business Executives for National Security. Bilden has been extensively involved in philanthropic work supporting national security education, maritime strategy, and cyber policy. During his tenure as Chairman of the Naval War College Foundation, the organization expanded its mission, and established the Bilden Endowment Fund for the Cyber & Innovation Policy Institute, raised over $20 million in major gifts, and launched new academic chairs in maritime irregular warfare and Arctic studies.

== Views and opinions ==
Bilden's public commentary reflects his long-standing focus on U.S. naval strength, Indo-Pacific security, and strategic competition with China.

He has consistently argued that American strategic interests require a robust and modernized naval fleet, warning that declining ship numbers undermine deterrence and stability in key maritime regions. Bilden has emphasized the need for sustained investment in submarine capabilities, advanced surface combatants, and emerging technologies to maintain U.S. maritime superiority.

Drawing on his experience in Asia, Bilden has frequently highlighted the strategic importance of the Indo-Pacific, describing the region as the central arena of 21st-century geopolitical rivalry. He has voiced concern about China's rapidly expanding naval forces and its assertive behavior in the South China Sea, calling for stronger regional partnerships and a more forward-leaning U.S. presence.

In discussions of defense management, Bilden has advocated for predictable budgets, long-term planning, and acquisition stability, arguing that industrial base disruptions weaken both readiness and innovation.

== Personal life ==
Bilden and his wife, Patricia Bilden, have been married three decades and are residents of Palm Beach, Florida. They attended Georgetown University together and subsequently were married at Holy Trinity Church in Georgetown. Patricia is a retired dermatologist originally from Iowa. The Bildens have three adult children who were educated in Hong Kong for two decades and are fluent in Mandarin Chinese. The Bilden's two sons commissioned from the U.S. Naval Academy and served in the U.S. Navy.
