= Zionsville Community School Corporation =

School district in Indiana, United States

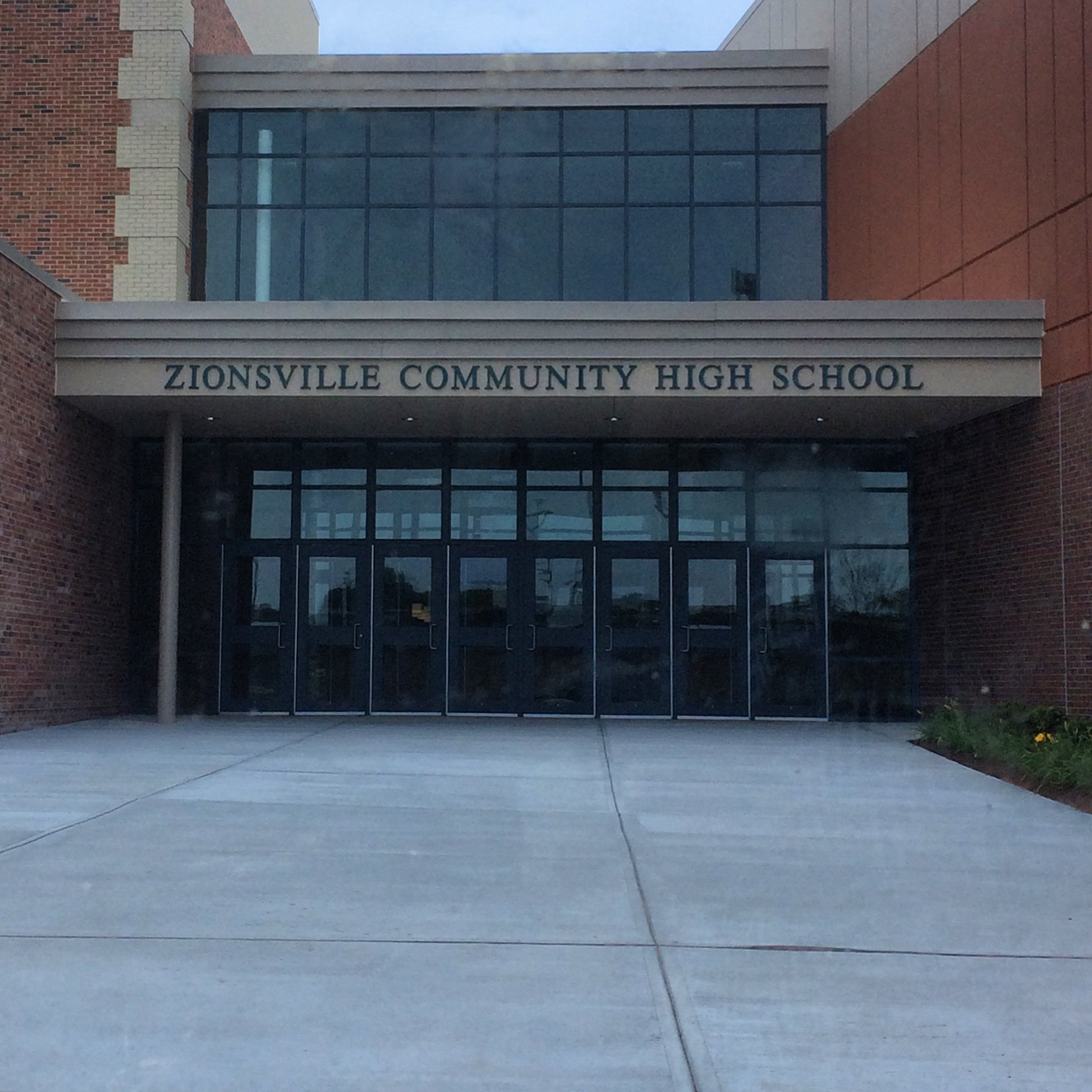
- Zionsville Community High School

Location
- Zionsville, Indiana, USA
- Coordinates: 39°57′42.78″N 86°16′14.09″W

District information
- Schools: 10

Other information
- Website: www.zcs.k12.in.us

Zionsville Community School Corporation is a school district headquartered in Zionsville, Indiana, the largest town in Boone County, Indiana.

The district includes large portions of Zionsville and a small portion of Whitestown.

== History ==
History Of Eagle Elementary School - Eagle Elementary opened 1953 with numerous renovations and additions happening later with the most in 1999

History Of The Old Union Elementary School - The Union School opened in 1938 serving grades 1st-8th. In 1958, it changed to Union Elementary, serving grades 1st-4th. Union Elementary would also feed into Zionsville Junior High and further down the road Zionsville Community High School. After numerous renovations and additions, the small school closed in 2006 in favor of a new facility. The old facility would lay vacant for many years but was used to hold bulk supplies for the district. But in 2019, the facility was demolished.

History Of Union Elementary School - Union Elementary School opened in 2007 serving as the new facility for an existing elementary.

History Of Stonegate Elementary School - Stonegate Elementary School opened in 2003 at the facility that now serves as Boone Meadow Elementary School. In 2005, that facility was converted into Zionsville West Middle School / Boone Meadow Middle School. As well in 2005, a new facility was constructed in the Stonegate subdivision that would serve as the new facility for Stonegate Elementary School. The new Stonegate Elementary opened its doors in 2005.

History Of Boone Meadow Elementary School - Boone Meadow Elementary School opened in 2008 in the same facility that once housed Zionsville West Middle School and Stonegate Elementary School in years prior. Since then, there have been some minor renovations to the school as the middle school inspired floor plan is tricky for an elementary.

History Of Trailside Elementary School - Trailside Elementary School is the newest Zionsville school, opening its doors in 2022. Trailside Elementary's floor plan is an exact copy of the new Union Elementary School.

History Of Pleasant View Elementary School - In 1996, Pleasant View Elementary opened its doors to the public. In 1998, a north section was added to the campus, being used for "upper elementary." In 2007, the north section was used for some high school classes. However, it no longer serves that purpose, and probably didn't for very long.

History Of Zionsville Middle School - In 2001, the Zionsville Middle School we know opened its doors. Before this, Zionsville Middle School was housed in what it is now the high school freshman center.

History Of Zionsville West Middle School - After the new Zionsville Middle School's opening, it quickly hit capacity. A need for a new middle school was needed, so the facility housing Stonegate Elementary was converted into an intermediate school serving grades 5th and 6th. During this time, a much larger facility was being built that would house all four grades. The Zionsville West Middle School under construction was an almost exact copy of the new Zionsville Middle School, but with some changes. The new Zionsville West Middle School would open its doors in 2007.

History Of The Freshman Center - Zionsville Middle School was opened in this facility in 1970, and that served as Zionsville Middle School until 2001 when the new facility was built. The old Zionsville Middle School now served as one of many things, one use that stuck is as the Educational Services Center. In 2005, this facility opened as the Zionsville Community School Freshman Center, connected by a long hallway.

As of 2023 the superintendent of schools of the Zionsville district is Rebecca Coffman, who started with Zionsville schools in 2001. She replaced Scott Robison, who began his term as superintendent circa 2008, and was in that capacity until his retirement in 2023.

== Schools ==
High:

- Zionsville Community High School (Opened 1970)

Middle:

- Zionsville Middle School (Opened 2001)
- Zionsville West Middle School (Opened 2005, New Facility 2007)

Elementary:

- Eagle Elementary School (Opened 1953)
- Pleasant View Elementary School (Opened 1996)
- Stonegate Elementary School (Opened 2004, New Facility 2007)
- Union Elementary School (Opened 2007)
- Boone Meadow Elementary School (Opened 2008)
- Trailside Elementary School (Opened 2022)
- (Old) Union Elementary School (Opened 1938, Closed 2006)
