= Country Showdown =

Annual American country music competition

The Country Showdown is an annual talent contest to find undiscovered country music singers across the United States. It is also the oldest and biggest Country Music Talent Search. As many as 100,000 acts compete in the Country Showdown annually, making it the largest country music talent competition in the United States.

== The competition ==
=== History and sponsorship ===
The annual event was first started in 1982 and created by Paul Stanley of PS Promotions. At the time Wrangler sponsored the event. Wrangler served as sponsor from 1982 - 1986. After 1986 the Showdown switched sponsors to True Value. Various companies co-sponsored the event, including GMC, Dodge, Coca-Cola, and Jimmy Dean. True Value was active in the event sponsorship for 14 years, until in 2000, when Colgate became the event sponsor until 2011.

In 2011 showdown sponsorship shifted again to Texaco where is remained for 3 Seasons

In 2015 the Country Showdown brought on a new President and CEO who shifted the show toward artist development as well as continuing the showcasing opportunities for artists. Radio Stations throughout the United States offer local showcases where artist move onto Regional then Semifinals events before being able to participate in the National Final Event. Each National Final offers artists mentoring sessions with music industry insiders, promoters, producers, artist development and stage development coaches. They also get an opportunity to tour and sing at iconic Nashville Honky Tonks and walk in the footsteps of past artists.

=== Structure ===
The Country Showdown is structured as a four-round, single-elimination tournament, with each round representing a larger geographic area than the one before it.

The opening round is the local round; it is typically sponsored by a local country radio station (approximately 450 stations hold local contests for the Country Showdown as of the early 2010s) in the spring. The winners of the local contests then move onto the state championships, whose winners in turn advance to one of five regional finals (Southwest, Southeast, Midwest, Northeast and West). The winners of each regional final advance to the national final, held at the Ryman Auditorium in Nashville, Tennessee, in January of each year. The National Final is taped in front of a live audience and later televised as a 1-hour-long program, and is broadcast on syndication in March and April. The act which is crowned victorious wins a grand prize of $100,000, along with the title of "Best New Act in Country Music", and a chance at notability which would help them to further their musical career.

=== Judging ===
Throughout the competition the same judging criteria are used to ensure a fair competition in each level. There are five different aspects the judges use to decide the winner: marketability, originality of performance, vocal and instrumental abilities, stage presence, and overall charisma. Additional points can be awarded if the contestants perform original music.

The judges for the January 14, 2010, National Final were: Fred Foster, Cris Lacy, Brian Mansfield, Jim Catino, Fletcher Foster, and Rod Essig. The judges are music business executives from Sony Music, Atlantic Records, Warner Music, and Creative Artists Agency. Brian Mansfield, though not a music executive, is a correspondent from Nashville, who works for the USA Today. Judges in the past have included Autumn House, Carole Ann Mobley, Patti Page, and Beverly Keel.

== Past Showdowns ==
=== 2015 Showdown ===
The Five Finalists in the 2015 Texaco Country Showdown were Eli Tellor, Nate Kenyon, Marie Wise Hawkins, The Brothers Roberson, and JB Aaron. This season was the 33rd season and was Hosted By LeAnn Rimes at The Ryman Auditorium, and was seen Nationally on ABC T.V. The winner of title "Best New Act In Country Music, and The $100,000 grand prize winner was The Brothers Roberson.

=== 2012 Showdown ===
The five finalists in the 2012 Texaco Country Showdown were Poor Man's Poison, Kate and Corey, The Brothers Roberson, Deidre Thornell, and Kassie and Ben. The event was hosted by Jewel. Poor Man's Poison won the $100,000 grand prize.

=== 2011 Showdown ===
The five finalists for the 2011 Texaco Country Showdown were Kendall Phillips who represented radio station WFMS of Indianapolis, Indiana; Carin Mari who represented radio station KBVC of Buena Vista, Colorado; Reggie Shaw who represented KRGI of Grand-Island, Nebraska; Greg Scudder who was representing KNTY of Sacramento, California; and Jaclyn North who represented KHOZ of Harrison, Arkansas.

The showdown was hosted by LeAnn Rimes and held at the Ryman Auditorium on January 13, 2011. Each contestant gave performances that proved them worthy of being a national contender. The $100,000 winner was Jaclyn North who was representing the Southeast regional.

=== 2010 Showdown ===
The finalists for the 2010 Showdown consisted of Kendall Phillips, Casey Lee Smith, Whisky Row, Terry Lee Spenser, and Karla Davis. The final competition to determine the winner was held at the Ryman Auditorium, and was hosted by former Country Showdown contestant LeAnn Rimes (who hosted for the 4th consecutive year). Contestants gave a tribute to past contestant, country music singer Garth Brooks who himself is a former Country Showdown contestant. The judges crowned Karla Davis the 2010 Showdown Winner.

=== 2009 Showdown ===
LeAnn Rimes hosted the finale for the 2009 Showdown. The finalists included: Matt Reeves, LiveWire, Johnny Bulford, and Korey Blake. In the end, Johnny Bulford took home the grand prize.

=== 2008 Showdown ===
Rimes also hosted the 2008 Showdown, which showcased performances by two-time National Finalists: Carrie Joy, Trevor Panczak, Christy Sugget, Nash Street, and Eldon Johnson. Regional Finalists were: Veronica Valencia (KUBB Country 96.3), Lesley Valadez, Emily Byers (97.3). The winner of that year's competition was Nash Street.

== Notable contestants and winners ==
Many contestants of the Showdown have gone on to have music careers, mostly in the country music genre. Tracy Byrd, Tracy Lawrence, Carrie Underwood, Mark Chesnutt, Jason Aldean, Ashton Shepherd, Jeff Bates, Katrina Elam, Toby Keith (as an Easy Money band member), and Brad Paisley all are contestants who won their local region of the Showdown. State and regional winners that are known in the country music business are Neal McCoy, Billy Dean, Sara Evans, Billy Ray Cyrus, Chris Young, Erika Jo, Miranda Lambert, John Michael Montgomery, Bobby Pinson, Chad Brock, LeAnn Rimes, Troy Gentry of Montgomery Gentry, Wayne Hancock, and Rick Trevino. Some other notable contestants include: Garth Brooks, Tim McGraw and Martina McBride.

== Country Showdown and reality television ties ==
Several Country Showdown contestants have also appeared American Idol, a reality television contest that differs from the Country Showdown in that is broader in scope and decides its winners through viewer votes. Contestants can appear on Idol either before or after their performance in the Country Showdown.

American Idol season 4 winner Carrie Underwood had previously won a local contest in the Country Showdown.

The most Recent Idol Winner who was a former showdown contestant is Maddie Poppe, who won the Sixteenth Season of idol. Maddie competed on the 33rd Texaco Country Showdown and advanced to the Midwest Regionals in 2014 at the Northern Lights Casino in Walker Minnesota where she was up for "Best Act in the Midwest". A title that was taken by Eli Tellor that year.

A notable act that went from the Showdown to appear on American Idol is Shelby Dressel. After her band earned 5th place at the Showdown, Dressel tried out for season 9 of American Idol and was cut when the top-24 contestants were decided. Another act that appeared with the Country Showdown and also American Idol is Kendall Phillips, who was a 2010 and 2011 national finalist for the Showdown. Unlike Dressel, Phillips appeared on American Idol before she tried out for the Showdown.

Phillips felt that American Idol prepared her for the Showdown. She said,"My experience on American Idol was good, definitely a learning process. There is so much going on behind the scenes that people don't even know about — numerous auditions before the 'televised judging', late hours, re-taping, interviews ... I really didn't know what to expect at 16, but I learned a lot about what goes in to a reality television show and the music industry. I am still grateful for the doors that Idol opened for me, but it's such a game of luck and it's a very strenuous process. Although, nothing in the music industry is without stress." Phillips competed on American Idol during the 2005 season and competed in the Hollywood rounds. Some other notable contestants who were involved in both programs include: Carrie Joy Andreas, Deanna Freeman,

Jaclyn North, the 2011 Country Showdown winner, also auditioned for Season 9 of American Idol, being cut in the Hollywood rounds.

Nashville Star, another reality contest (this one focused on country music), has also featured former Country Showdown contestants, most famously Chris Young and Miranda Lambert.
