= Poor Man's Poison =

American music group

- Origin: Hanford, California, U.S.
- Genres: Alternative country; indie folk; gothic country
- Years active: 2009 – 2014; 2019 – present
- Label: Independent
- Members: Ryan Hakker; Michael Jacobs; Tommy McCarthy; Dustin Medeiros
- Website: poormanspoison.net

Poor Man's Poison is an American music group from Hanford, California. The lineup since its creation consists of guitarists Ryan Hakker and Michael Jacobs, mandolinist Tommy McCarthy and double bassist Dustin Medeiros; all members share vocal duties, although Hakker usually acts as lead vocalist.

The band was originally formed in 2009 from the remnants of Done For Good, another band by Hakker, McCarthy and Medeiros; after a hiatus in 2014, they reformed in 2019, this time more focused on releasing studio singles rather than producing albums or performing live. Mostly defined by their acoustic sound, they have been categorized as various genres, including alternative country, indie folk and gothic country; Medeiros has claimed that the band "cannot be pinned down in one specific category".

== History ==
Ryan Hakker and Dustin Medeiros were friends since middle school, and had both been friends with Tommy McCarthy since high school. A previous band, Done For Good, included Hakker as singer, Medeiros as drummer, and McCarthy as guitarist. Done For Good came to an end after releasing a single album, due to Medeiros developing permanent tinnitus, which made him unable to play drums or "any excessively loud music". As a result, Hakker, Medeiros, and McCarthy, joined by guitarist Mike Jacobs, whom had known Hakker and Medeiros since high school and worked with Hakker in previous bands, and formed Poor Man's Poison in 2009, with McCarthy switching to the mandolin and Medeiros to the double bass.

They released three studio albums and one live album at the Fox Theatre in Hanford between 2009 and 2014, before temporarily splitting up. When the band got back together in 2019, they decided to focus on releasing singles instead of full albums due to their success on streaming platforms.

In September 2012, Poor Man's Poison won the "Best New Act in Country Music" at the Country Showdown in Nashville. They have also performed at Guantanamo Bay for US troops and opened for the Charlie Daniels Band.

Started in 2021, their side project named "Dr. Villain", led by Dustin Medeiros and Ryan Hakker, their single "This is the End" was released. In November 2023, Dr. Villain released a 3 track EP named "Welcome to the Show." with the songs "Welcome to the Show" "Running out of Options" and "Vamos! (Dr. Villain Experience)".

== Band members ==
- Ryan Hakker – lead vocals, guitar
- Michael Jacobs – vocals, guitar
- Tommy McCarthy – vocals, mandolin
- Dustin Medeiros – vocals, double bass

== Discography ==
=== Studio albums ===
- The Cycle (2006) (As the band, Done for Good)
- Poor Man's Poison (2009)
- Friends with the Enemy (2011)
- Providence (2014)

=== EPs ===
- In the End (2021)
- The Great Big Lie (2023)
- Welcome to the Show (2023) (Dr. Villain, a side project with just Ryan and Dustin)
- Promised Land (2025)

=== Live albums ===
- Live at the Fox (2012)

=== Singles ===
- "Hell's Coming With Me" (2019)
- "Let Us All Down" (2020)
- "Feed The Machine" (2020) (cover by Egor Grositskiy)
- "Every Day is Exactly the Same" (2021)
- "The Woods" (2024) (Collaboratory single with Travis Brooks)
- "Ireland Sky" (2024) (Collaboratory single with The violinist Travis Brooks)
- "If We Were Vampires" (2022) (Collaboratory with Motel Drive)
- "This Is The End" (2021) (As Dr. Villain, a side project with Ryan and Dustin)
