= City Hall Station =

City Hall Station or City Hall station may refer to:

== Asia ==
=== South Korea ===
- City Hall station (Busan Metro), a metro station in Busan
- City Hall station (Daejeon Metro), a metro station in Daejeon
- City Hall station (Seoul), a subway station in Seoul
- City Hall–Yongin University station, a people-mover station in Yongin
- Bucheon City Hall station, a subway station in Bucheon, Gyeonggi
- Gimhae City Hall station, a light metro station in Buwon-dong, Gimhae
- Hanam City Hall station, a subway station in Hanam, Gyeonggi
- Incheon City Hall station, a subway station in Incheon
- Siheung City Hall station, a railway station in Siheung, Gyeonggi
- Suwon City Hall station, a subway station in Suwon, Gyeonggi
- Uijeongbu City Hall station, a light metro station in Uijeongbu

=== Singapore ===
- City Hall MRT station, a mass rapid transit station in the Downtown Core district of Singapore

=== Taiwan ===
- Taichung City Hall metro station, a mass transit station in Taichung, Taiwan
- Taipei City Hall Bus Station, a multi-use transportation complex in Taipei, Taiwan
- Taipei City Hall metro station, a mass rapid transit station in Taipei, Taiwan
- Xindian City Hall Station, former name of Xindian District Office metro station in New Taipei City

== North America ==
=== Canada ===
- City Hall/Bow Valley College station, a light rail transit station in Calgary, Alberta
- Broadway–City Hall station, an underground rapid transit station in Vancouver, British Columbia
- Kitchener City Hall station, a light rail transit station in Kitchener, Ontario

=== United States ===
- City Hall station (PATCO), a commuter rail station in Camden, New Jersey
- 15th Street/City Hall station, a subway station in Philadelphia, Pennsylvania
- City Hall station (Rochester), a former subway station in Rochester, New York
- Gresham City Hall station, a light rail transit station in Gresham, Oregon
- Old City Hall station, a light rail station in Tacoma, Washington

==== New York City Subway ====
- Brooklyn Bridge–City Hall station (IRT Lexington Avenue Line) at Park Row in Manhattan; serving the 4, 5, 6, and <6> trains
- City Hall station (IRT Lexington Avenue Line), the loop station closed 1945; underneath the public area in front of City Hall in Manhattan
- City Hall station (BMT Broadway Line) at Murray Street and Broadway in Manhattan; serving the N, R, and W trains
- City Hall station (IRT Second Avenue Line), a former elevated station in Manhattan

== See also ==
- City Hall (disambiguation)
- Hall Station (disambiguation)
