= Kate and Corey =

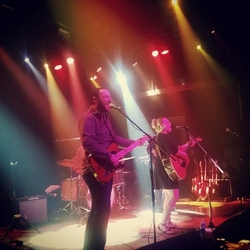
- Kate and Corey Performing at Terminal West in Atlanta, GA - 2014

Background information
- Origin: Atlanta, GA, Buffalo, NY
- Genres: Roots Rock; Singer/Songwriter; Americana
- Years active: 2010–present
- Website: Official site

Kate and Corey are a Singer/Songwriter and Roots Rock band from Atlanta, Georgia. The band consists of Kate Coleman on vocals and guitar and Corey Coleman on vocals and guitar.

In 2011, they independently released their debut album, "You're Gonna Like Us".

In 2015, they released their first full band recording, the EP "Somewhere Else Tonight".

== History ==
Kate and Corey was started in 2010 in Buffalo, New York.

They began dating and decided to quit their respective bands to pursue music together.

At first they performed on the streets of Buffalo, New York and quickly progressed into bars, restaurants and eventually concert venues.

In 2012 they competed in the 31st Annual Texaco Country Showdown, the longest-running talent competition in the nation. They won the local (Olean, NY), New York State, and Northeastern Regional portions in the competition, and were one of the 5 finalists in the nationally televised final competition at the Ryman Auditorium in Nashville, TN, an honor previously shared by Garth Brooks, Martina McBride, Sara Evans, Miranda Lambert, Brad Paisley, Neal McCoy, and Billy Ray Cyrus. The event was hosted by Jewel.

In 2012 they relocated to Atlanta, Georgia and quickly began gaining a following in the Southeast.

In 2013 they were married in Buffalo, NY

In 2014 they were listed as one of ten "Atlanta Bands You Need To Know About" by Atlanta Music Guide, and were nominated by the 2014 Georgia Music Awards for Best Americana group

In 2015 they released their first full band EP, "Somewhere Else Tonight"

== Discography ==
=== Albums ===
- You're Gonna Like Us (2011)

=== EPs ===
- Somewhere Else Tonight (2015)

=== Singles ===
- Getting Out of Here (2014)
- People Wave (2014)
- Reckless Guess (2014)
- On The Side (2014)
- I Don't Understand (2014)
