= City Hall (Muncie, Indiana) =

- U.S. National Register of Historic Places
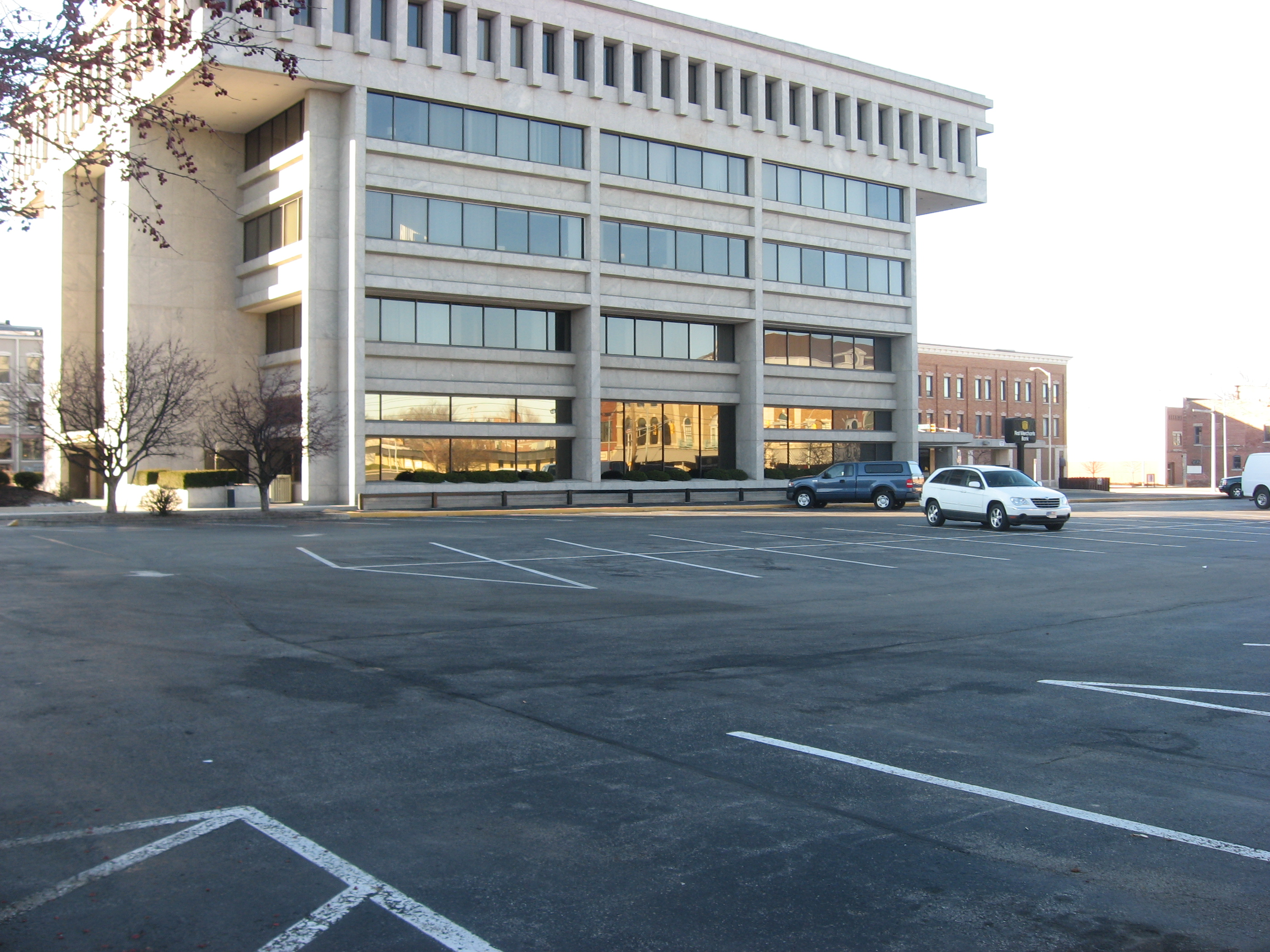
- Former location of City Hall, January 2012

- Location within Indiana Location within the United States
- Location: 220 E. Jackson St., Muncie, Indiana
- Coordinates: 40°11′34″N 85°23′4″W
- Area: less than one acre
- Built: 1925
- Architect: Hauck & Smenner
- Architectural style: Renaissance
- MPS: Downtown Muncie MRA
- NRHP reference No.: 88002114
- Added to NRHP: November 14, 1988

City Hall was a historic city hall building located at Muncie, Indiana. It was built in 1925, and was a three-story, L-shaped, Renaissance Revival style brick building with terra cotta detailing. It has been demolished.

It was added to the National Register of Historic Places in 1988.
