= Kendall Phillips =

American singer-songwriter

- Born: December 28, 1988 (age 36); Indianapolis, Indiana
- Origin: Zionsville, Indiana, US
- Genres: Country, pop, country pop
- Occupation: Singer-songwriter
- Instrument(s): Vocals, guitar, piano
- Years active: 2006–present
- Website: www.kendallphillips.com

Kendall Phillips (born December 28, 1988) is an American country singer-songwriter. She is most recently known for being a 2010 and 2011 National Finalist in the Colgate Country Showdown and for being a contestant on the 5th and 15th seasons of American Idol, being eliminated in the Hollywood rounds in each season.

In 2007 Phillips was featured in Chicken Soup for the Soul's Chicken Soup For the American Idol Soul. Later that year Kendall's music video for her single "It's You" made the Top 64 videos on CMT's Music City Madness and was featured on CMT.com.

In late December 2012 Kendall signed with sponsor, Alpha Energy, partnering with NASCAR and Turner Motorsports driver, Ben Rhodes for upcoming events in 2013. Shortly after, Kendall signed a deal with HMG Nashville and celebrity publicist, Jackie Monaghan for the release of the lead single off her upcoming album, "You Should Know". "You Should Know" released to radio in the United States and Canada in January 2013.
