= Town Hall (Castle Hall) =

- U.S. National Register of Historic Places
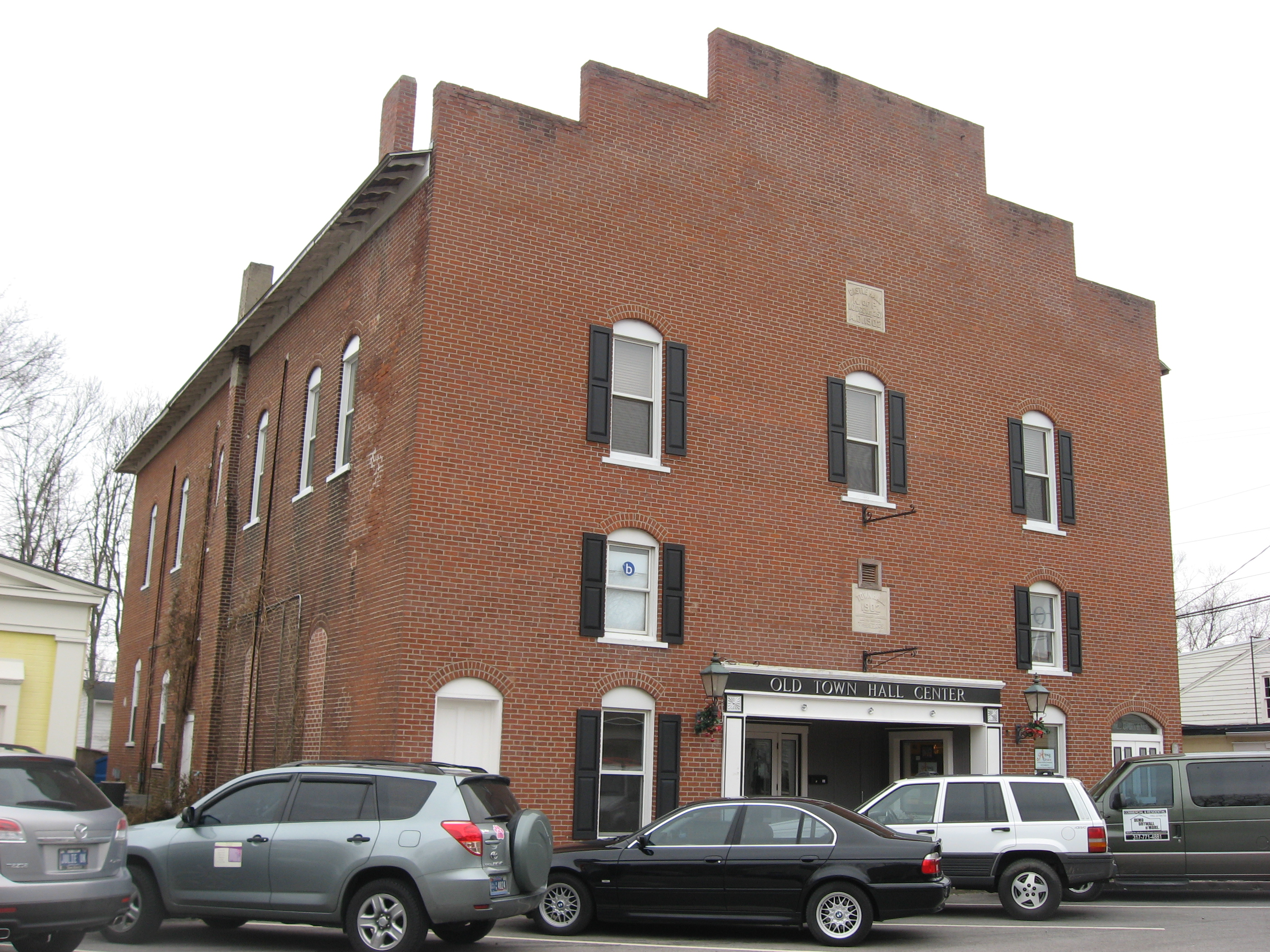
- Zionsville Town Hall, March 2011

- Location within Boone County, Indiana Location within Indiana Location within the United States
- Location: 65 E. Cedar St., Zionsville, Indiana
- Coordinates: 39°57′5″N 86°15′40″W
- Area: less than one acre
- Built: 1902
- Built by: J. F. Wild & Company
- NRHP reference No.: 83000115
- Added to NRHP: June 9, 1983

Town Hall (Castle Hall), also known as the Zionsville Town Hall, is a historic town hall located at Zionsville, Indiana. It was built in 1902, and is a two-story, rectangular red brick building measuring 54 feet wide and 80 feet deep. It features a stepped gable end. The interior was remodeled in 1935 to house a movie theater. The building also housed a local chapter of the Knights of Pythias.

It was listed on the National Register of Historic Places in 1983.
