= City Hall (Reading, Pennsylvania) =

- U.S. National Register of Historic Places
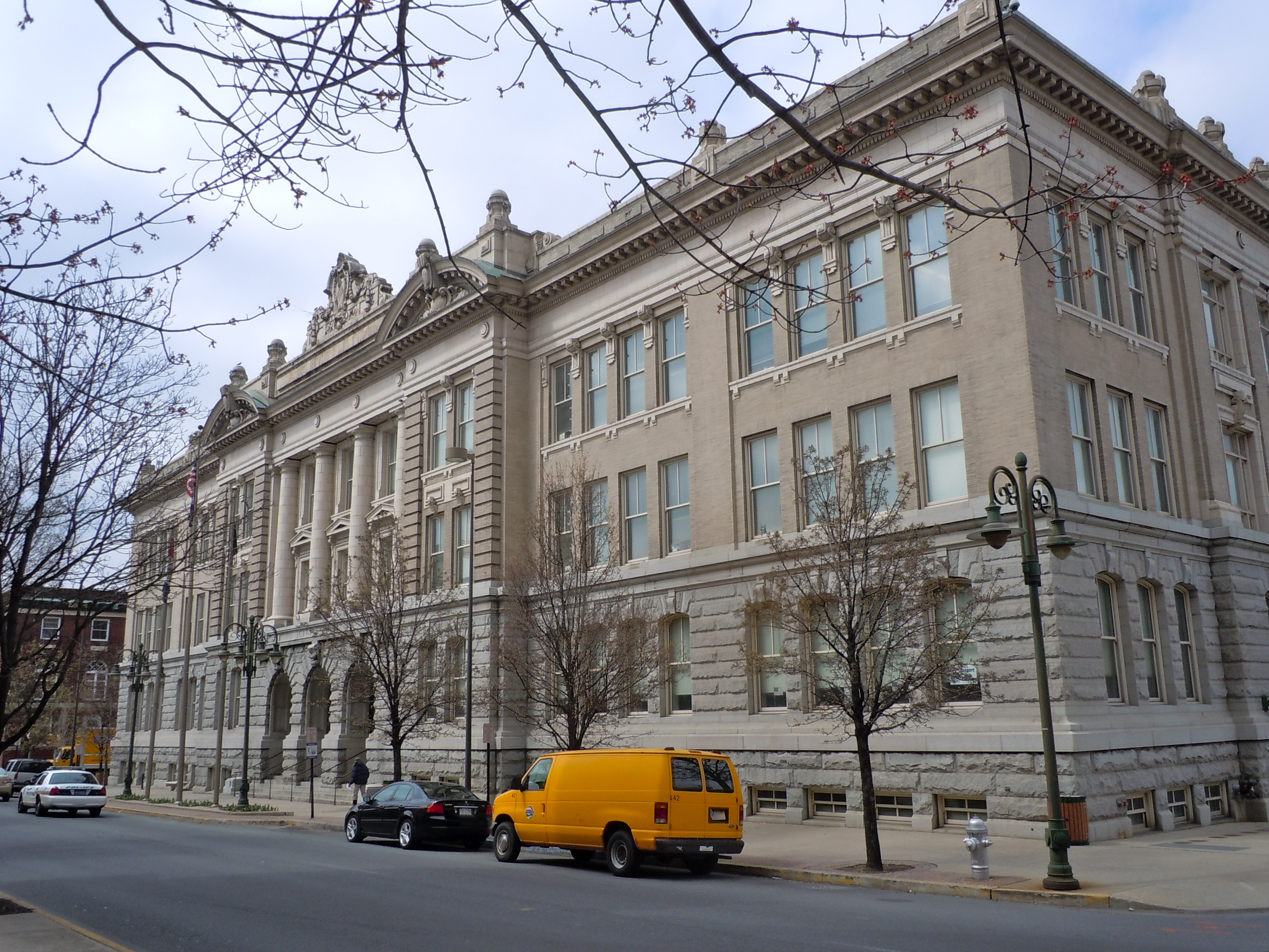
- Reading City Hall, April 2011

- Location within Pennsylvania Location within the United States
- Location: 8th & Washington Sts., Reading, Pennsylvania
- Coordinates: 40°20′16″N 75°55′18″W
- Area: 6.3 acres (2.5 ha)
- Built: 1904
- Architect: Davis & Davis
- Architectural style: Beaux Arts, Italianate
- NRHP reference No.: 82003760
- Added to NRHP: April 13, 1982

City Hall, originally known as Boy's High School, is a historic city hall located Reading, Berks County, Pennsylvania. It was built in 1904, as the high school for boys, and converted to use as a city hall in 1929. It is a three-story, with basement, granite and gray brick building in the Beaux Arts style. It features terra cotta decorative elements and measures 210 feet by 201 feet.

It was listed on the National Register of Historic Places in 1982.
