= Dordrecht City Hall =

Coordinates: 51°48′49″N 4°39′52″E

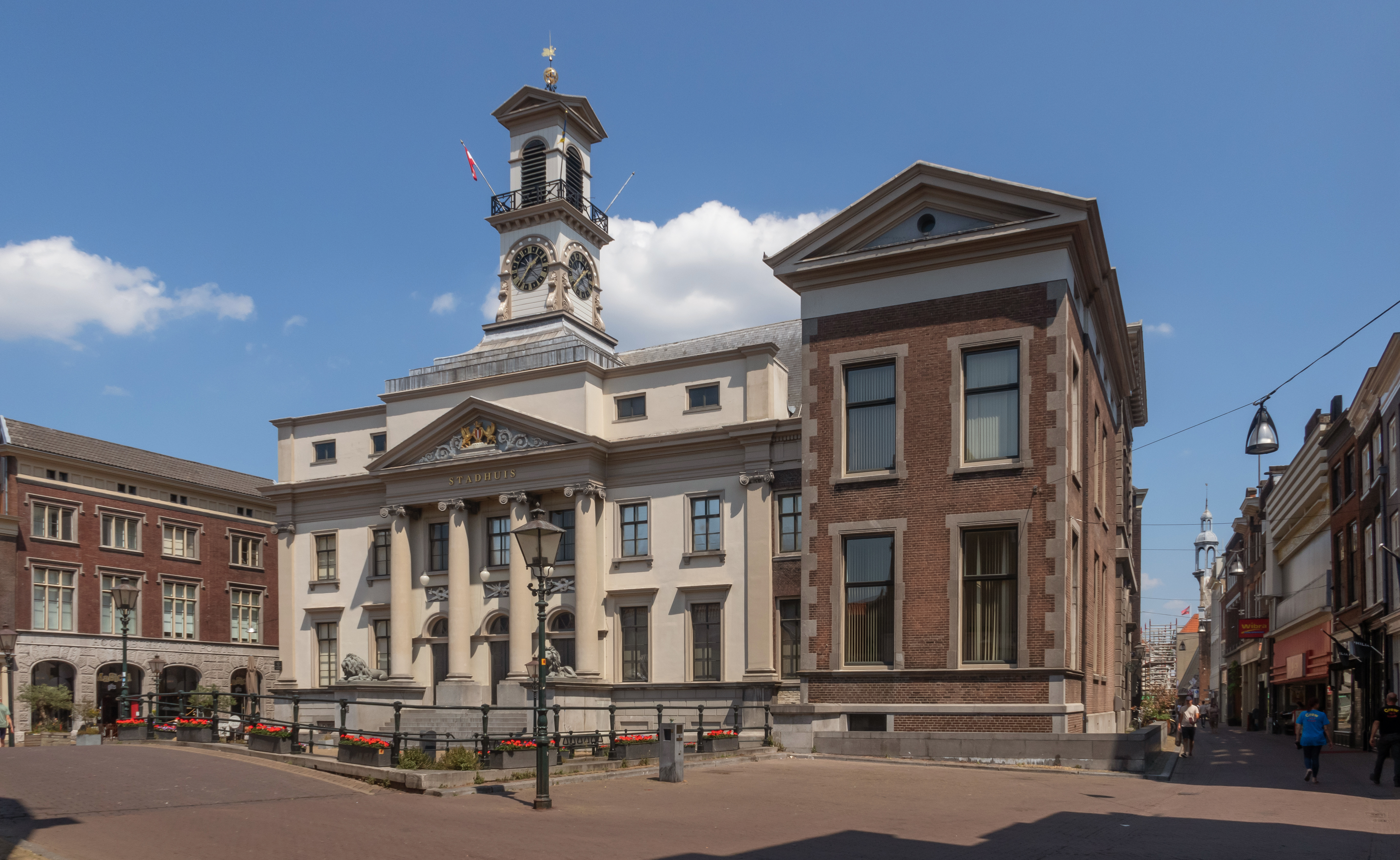
Old City Hall of Dordrecht on the Stadhuisplein.

The City Hall in Dordrecht is a renaissance building decorated in neoclassic style on the Stadhuisplein and over one of the city harbors; the Voorstraathaven. It is the seat of the city's government, which first received city rights in 1220, and today it is still the place where residents often hold their civic wedding ceremonies.

== History ==
The town hall was built in the 14th century as a cloth hall, rebuilt in 1544 and given a fashionable neoclassic facade in 1635-43, in order to match the prestigious Amsterdam City Hall built in the same period. The 17th century look of the building was preserved during several restorations, but in 1835 a wooden tower was added to the top of the building.

The lions at either side of the steps were made in 1841 by the Ironworks IJzergieterij L.J. Enthoven en Co, of The Hague. The right side of the building stretches over the Voorstraathaven with gothic arches dating from the 14th century, as is the cellar with its sculpted 14th century keystones in the vaulted ceilings. The clocks in the building were made by Pieter van Dormer en Sloterdijck in 1449 and by Gregorius Waghevens in 1514.

The current use of the building is mostly for events and visitors. The municipal offices moved in 1975 to the Stadskantoor on the Spuiboulevard.
