= City Hall (Pawhuska, Oklahoma) =

- U.S. National Register of Historic Places
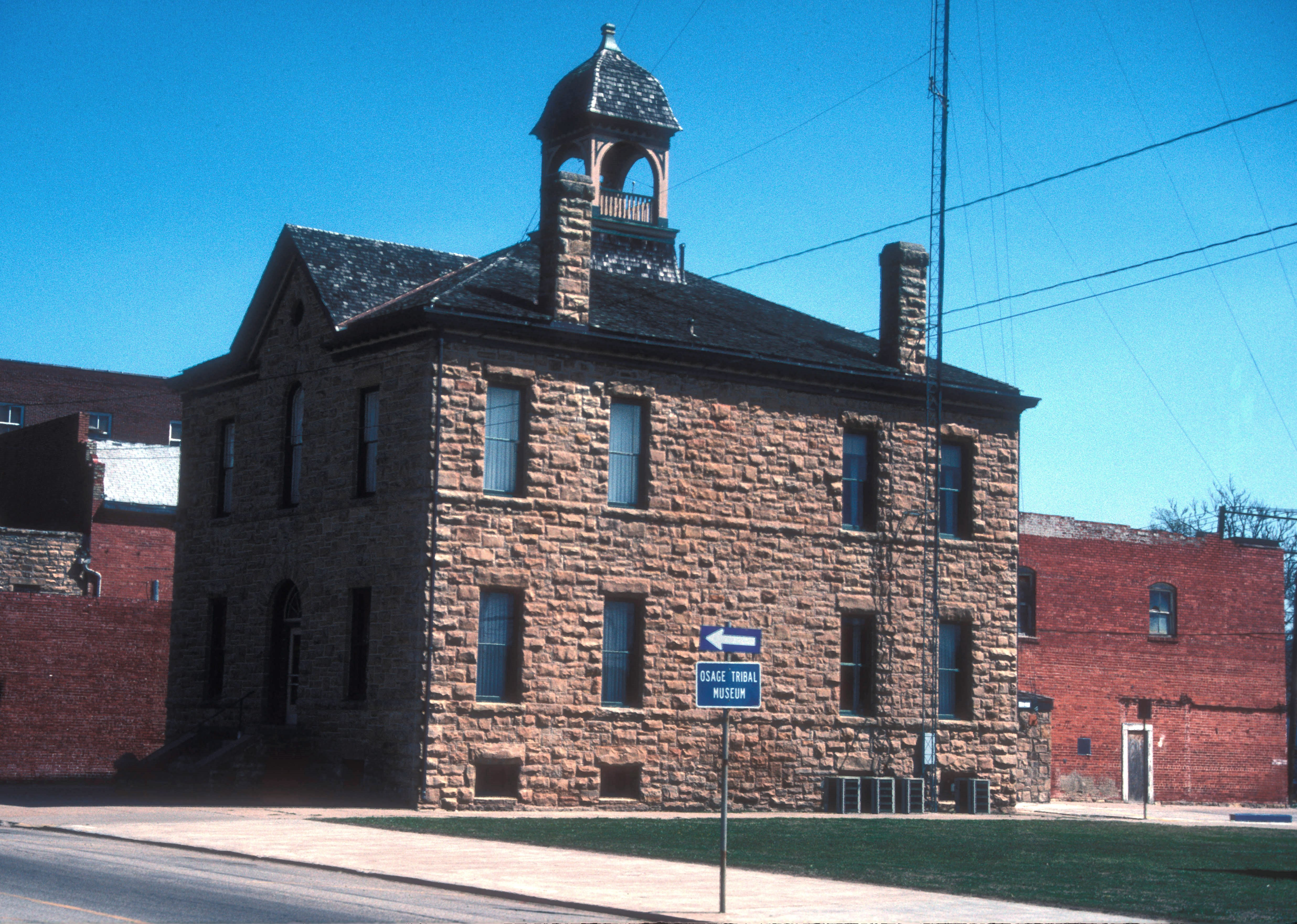

- Location within Oklahoma
- Location: Main and Grandview Ave., Pawhuska, Oklahoma
- Coordinates: 36°39′47″N 96°20′27″W
- Area: less than one acre
- Built: 1894
- NRHP reference No.: 76001574
- Added to NRHP: January 1, 1976

The City Hall of Pawhuska, Oklahoma, also known as the Osage Council House, was built in 1894. It was listed on the National Register of Historic Places in 1976.

It was built in 1894 to serve as the main government building of the Osage Nation. It replaced a previous Council House building which burned.

It is a two-story 38 by 52 feet (12 m × 16 m) building, with a 60 feet (18 m) tall belltower.

In 1974 it was home of city offices on the first floor, and the police department in the basement level. A chamber room for the City Council is on the second floor.

It is located at Main and Grandview Avenue.
