= City Hall (Rock Springs, Wyoming) =

- U.S. National Register of Historic Places
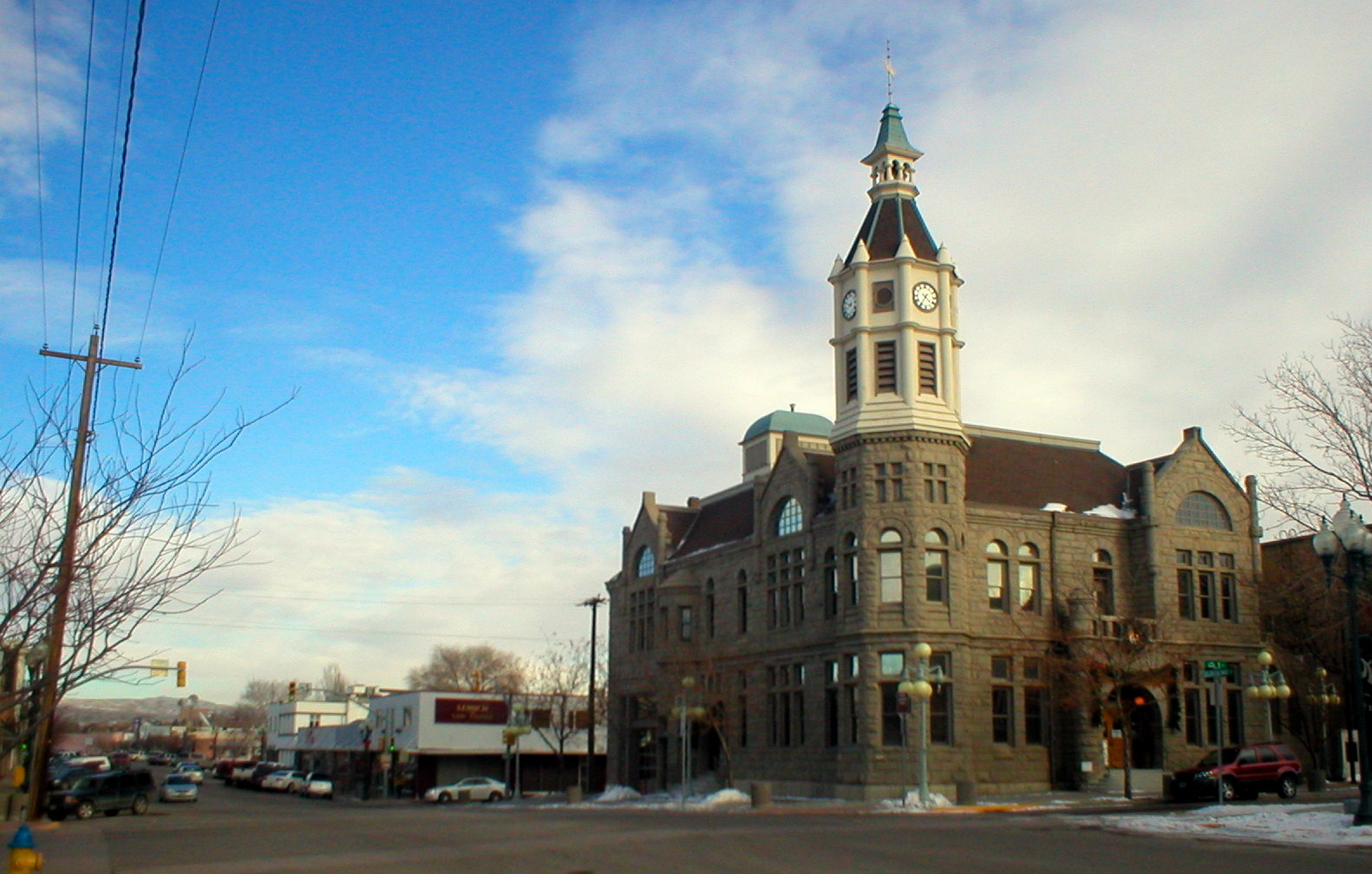

- Location within Wyoming Location within the United States
- Location: 4th and B Sts., Rock Springs, Wyoming
- Coordinates: 41°35′6″N 109°13′14″W
- Area: 0.5 acres (0.20 ha)
- Built: 1894
- Architect: Kern, Martin Didicus; Et al.
- Architectural style: Romanesque, Richardsonian Romanesque
- NRHP reference No.: 80004053
- Added to NRHP: May 15, 1980

The City Hall of Rock Springs, Wyoming, located at 4th and B Sts. in Rock Springs, is a gray sandstone building that was built in 1894. It includes Richardsonian Romanesque architecture in a design by Salt Lake City architect M.D. Kern. It has an irregular plan within 90.9-by-71.9-foot (27.7 m × 21.9 m) dimensions. It was listed on the National Register of Historic Places in 1980.

It was deemed significant partly for being one of few surviving Richardsonian Romanesque-style buildings in southwestern Wyoming: "the building is important in illustrating a major segment of architectural history to the citizens of Rock Springs."
