= Hall Station, West Virginia =

Hall Station
- Unincorporated community
- Location within the state of West Virginia Hall Station (the United States)
- Coordinates: 39°3′33″N 80°7′18″W
- Country: United States
- State: West Virginia
- County: Barbour
- Elevation: 1,391 ft (424 m)
- Time zone: UTC-5 (Eastern (EST))
  - Summer (DST): UTC-4 (EDT)
- GNIS ID: 1697076

Hall Station was an unincorporated community in Barbour County, West Virginia, United States.
