= City Hall (Oranjestad) =

Cultural heritage monument in Aruba

City Hall Eloy Arends House
- Stadhuis
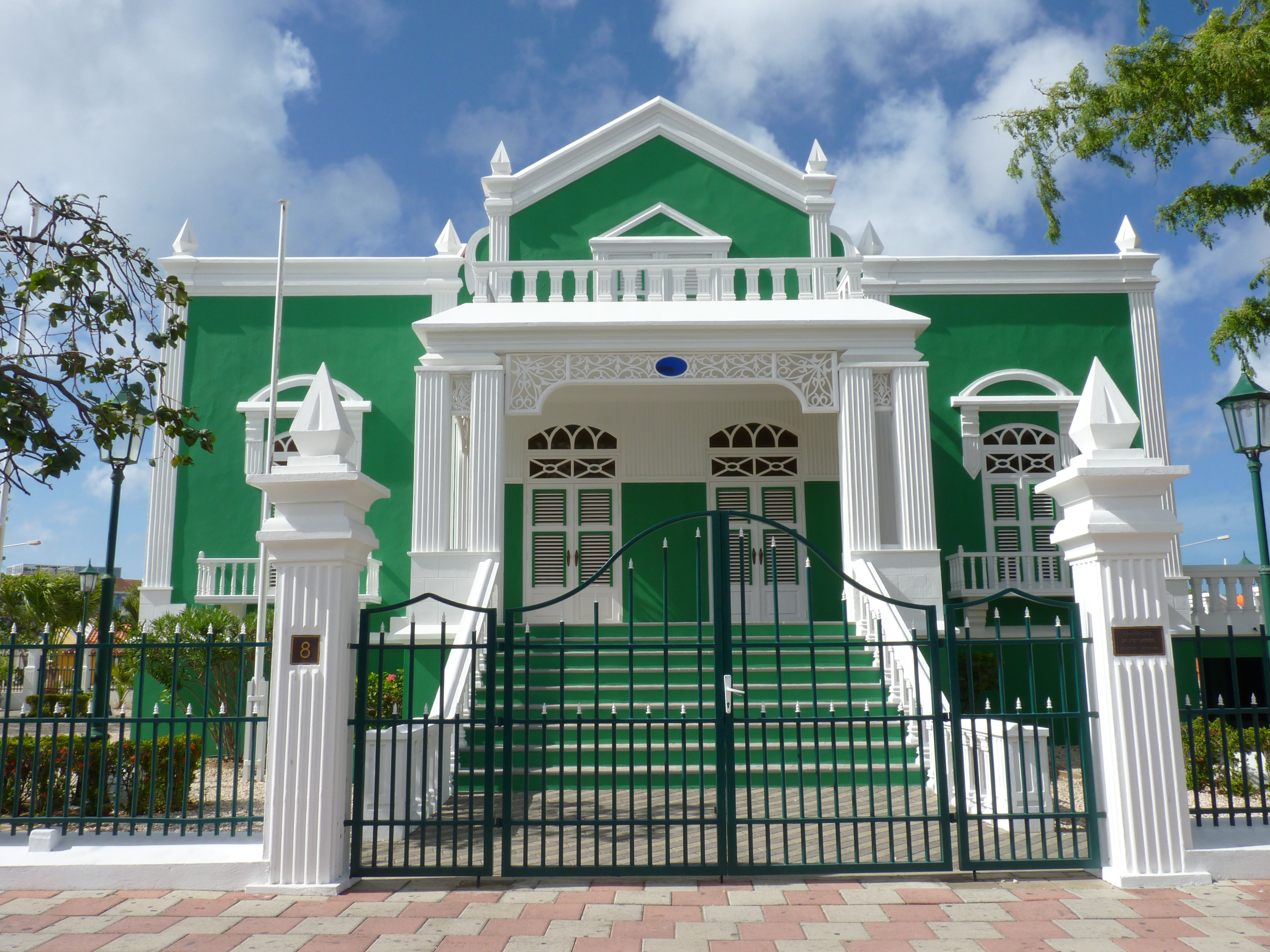
- Interactive map of the City Hall; Eloy Arends House area

General information
- Architectural style: Neo-Baroque
- Location: Wilhelminastraat 8, Oranjestad, Aruba
- Coordinates: 12.51854°N 70.03600°W
- Current tenants: Civil registration
- Construction started: 1922
- Inaugurated: 1925
- Owner: Monuments Fund Aruba

Design and construction
- Architect: Chibi Wever

City Hall (also known as the Eloy Arends House; Dutch: Stadhuis) is home to the civil registration of Oranjestad, Aruba. The building used to be a doctor's office and residential home of Eloy Arends. Aruba is only subdivided in regions and zones for administrative and statistical purposes, therefore, it is not a city hall defined as the seat of municipal government. The city hall is used for civil registrations, passports and marriages.

== History ==
Jacobo Eloy Maria Arends was a medical doctor in Aruba. In 1922, he announced his engagement with Maria Monica Laclé. According to tradition, a house was constructed for the couple prior to the marriage. The house was built on a 1,545 square metres (16,630 sq ft) lot in the centre of Oranjestad. The architect was Chibi Wever and the design was influenced by South American Neo-Baroque. In 1925, the couple married, and Laclé was allowed to see the house. The house uses sliding doors to allow for flexible usage of the interior space.

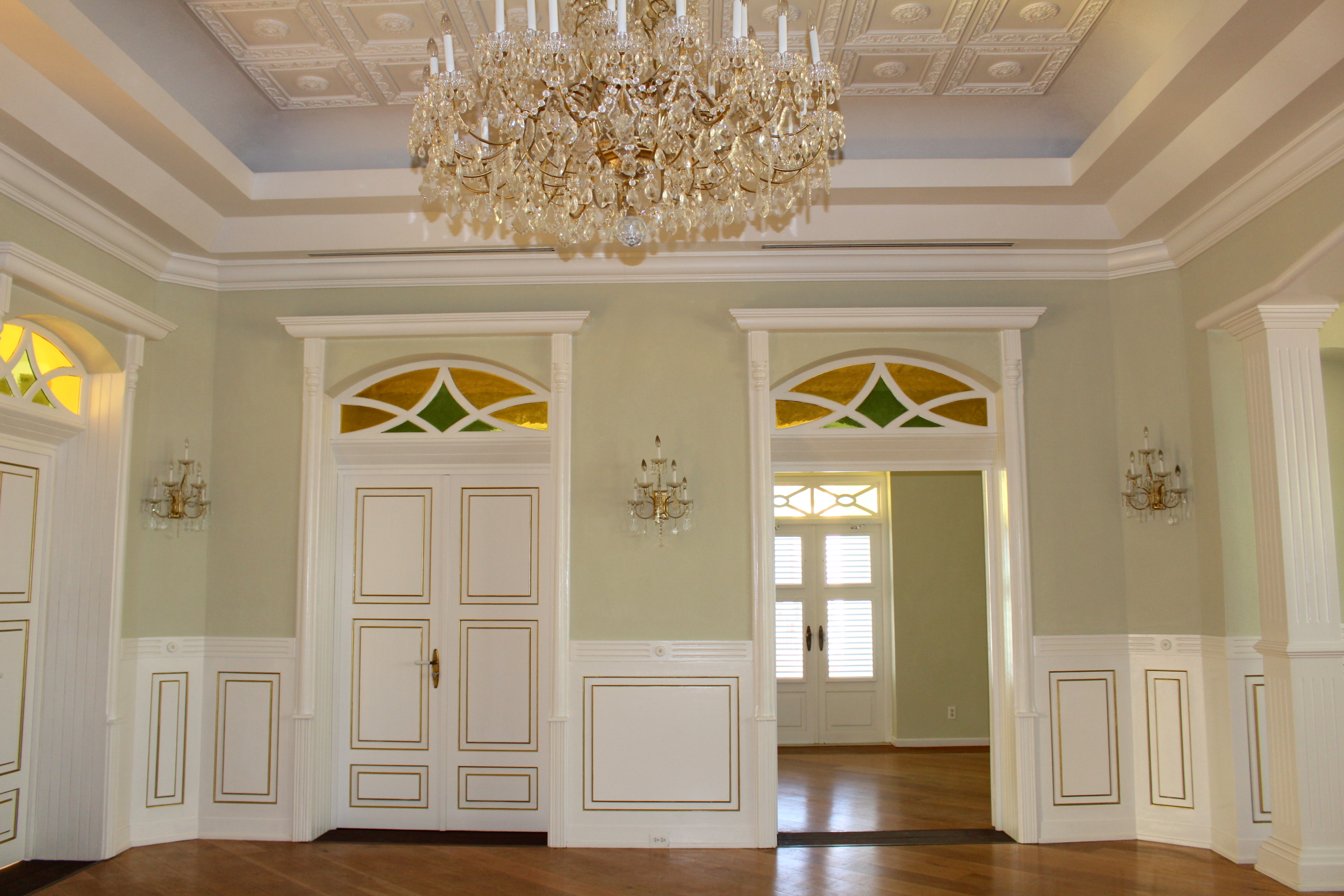
The big hall

In 1960, Arends died, and the house became property of his son Jesus Eloy Arends. At first it was used as a dentist's office. Later, it was in use as restaurant, but became vacant in 1980 in a neglected state. In 1985, it served as the headquarters of People's Electoral Movement (MEP), In January 1988, it was sold to the Government of Aruba. The purchase of the house was controversial, and the renovation was postponed. In the meantime, it became used by homeless people. In 1993, a fire severely damaged the building.

In 1997, the Eloy Arends House was restored, and became home to the civil registration. In 1999, ownership was transferred to the Monuments Fund Aruba. In 2014, another major restoration took place. The City Hall also developed in a popular place for tourists to get married.
