= Town Hall Square, Sydney =

Proposed public square in Sydney, Australia

Town Hall Square
- Owner: City of Sydney
- Location: Sydney CBD, New South Wales, Australia
- Public transit: Town Hall; Town Hall; Gadigal; Town Hall (Park Street), Hyde Park, Museum station, St James station
- Interactive map of Town Hall Square
- Coordinates: 33.8733223°S 151.2066366°E

Town Hall Square is a proposed public square in Sydney opposite Sydney Town Hall, at the corner of George and Park streets. The City of Sydney council, led by Clover Moore, has proposed the project, which builds on proposals dating to the 1980s. The site is occupied by seven buildings, including a Woolworths supermarket, retail stores and a pub, which would be demolished.

In February 2026 the council endorsed the project. It was supported by the Australian Institute of Architects.

It has been opposed by the Shop, Distributive and Allied Employees Association, business groups including Business Sydney, premier Chris Minns, and the NSW Opposition.

In September, planning minister Paul Scully blocked the City of Sydney council from approving Town Hall Square, pending advice from the Independent Planning Commission (IPC). The IPC later advised the project was of state significance.

== History ==
There is a long history of proposed square projects in Sydney. Some were partly conceived, and some were built in non-central locations.

Since 1982, there have been plans to redevelop the area opposite Town Hall into a city square.

Successive lord mayors acquired land for the site over decades. In 1985, the City of Sydney purchased the Woolworths building.

The building at 532-540 George Street (Former Bebarfalds, 'Woolworths building') was constructed in 1929. The building in its present form was comprehensively altered in 1966/1967 and the building is stripped of the original style. Most orignial internals have previously been removed and some of the offices are vacant. The building is not a rare or an architecturally distinguished example of the style or an important work of the architect.

Between 1922 and 1932, Park Street was widened on the south side between Pitt Street and George Street. The original Coronation Hotel was demolished and the current building was named after the original. The current Coronation Hotel is not the original building of the same name. The City of Sydney have owned the building since 1988. The hotel is not as intact or architecturally distinct as other similar or nearby buildings.

The 2026 plan was informed by prior plans and studies such as Sustainable Sydney 2030, the Gehl Architects Public Space Public Life 2007 and 2020 studies, the Town Hall Precinct Public Domain Plan Streetscapes Study (Draft) 2020 by Hassell, and the Gehl Architects 2017 Town Hall Precinct Urban Design Study. The City of Sydney's 2021 Town Hall Precinct Public Domain Plan included Town Hall Square as a public space project opportunity.

== 2026 proposal ==
Plans for a town square were approved for fast-tracking by the council in 2025, with the project to be started from 2028. In February 2026, the City of Sydney council passed a motion enabling construction works on the square to begin. A head designer was planned to be appointed for the project in February 2026.

In March, Moore confirmed that the council had acquired all buildings that were slated for demolition.

In September 2026, Paul Scully referred the project to be examined by the Independent Planning Commission for potential state significant development approval.

In October, the IPC published advice that the project was of state significance.

The estimate cost of the project is about $94 million, and the City of Sydney has allocated a total project budget of up to $150 million.

=== Design ===
The project is slated to include eucalypts, moving water, seating and circular paving patterns to provide an outdoor venue for events within a 4,200 metres (13,800 ft) space. The square will have an Aboriginal name.

Many of the existing basements of the site would be utilised for deep soil planting.

The design anticipates redevelopment of adjacent buildings on the south of the square. The 'edge condition' of the two neighbouring buildings to the south of the square was considered inconsistent in plan alignment by the design report. One of the buildings, a modernist office tower built for the Sydney County Council at 570 George Street, is a listed heritage item.

There are no proposed underground connections with Town Hall railway station. Significant impacts on state railway infrastructure was not expected, as the underground entrance to Woolworths was planned to be walled off. Any design changes to the station were left up to Transport for NSW.

=== Support ===
City of Sydney Lord Mayor Clover Moore is a proponent of the square.

The City of Sydney council voted to endorse the project and progress the proposal, with a vote of 9–0.

In August 2026, the Australian Institute of Architects lended its support to the project.

The Tourism & Transport Forum (TTF) supported the project and designs released in August 2026.

=== Opposition ===
The Shop, Distributive and Allied Employees Association retail workers union opposes the project. At the 2026 New South Wales Labor Party conference at Sydney Town Hall, Bernie Smith of the Shop, Distributive and Allied Employees Association union moved a motion to oppose the square. Smith claimed it was Clover Moore's retirement project and argued the ALP was not the Association of Landscapers and Pavers, but for the people who work.

Business Sydney opposes the proposed square. Executive Director Paul Nicolaou wrote to Yasmin Catley and John Graham to oppose the project.

In September 2026, Clinton Maynard at 2GB urged premier Chris Minns to intervene with the council to prevent development of the square.

Chris Minns does not support the project. He described it as too expensive, disruptive, and said businesses would have to close down. The NSW Opposition backed the opposition of the Minns government.

The Daily Telegraph has published a number of articles opposing the proposal.

Nicolaou welcomed the decision to refer the to the IPC for assessment.
