= Town Hall Theatre =

Town Hall Theatre may refer to:

- Town Hall Theatre (Centerville), Ohio, a theatre company and venue
- Town Hall Theatre (Galway), Ireland, an event venue
- The Town Hall (New York City), an event venue
