= Hall Station, Colorado =

- locale
- Interactive map of Hall Station, Colorado
- Coordinates: 38°50′18″N 103°52′11″W
- Country: United States
- State: Colorado
- Counties: Lincoln
- Elevation: 5,525 ft (1,684 m)
- Time zone: UTC-7 (MST)
  - Summer (DST): UTC-6 (MDT)
- ZIP code: 80833 (Rush)
- Area code: 719
- GNIS feature ID: 195178

Hall Station is a small rural locale in Lincoln County, Colorado, United States on the northeast corner of the intersection of State Highway 94 (milepost 45) and County Road 11. Hall Station is a 101 by 211 ft (30 by 64 m) grass/dirt area, suitable for parking, and fenced on three sides. Despite the name, the nearest railroad is 39 miles (62 km) east and 52 miles (84 km) west. Hall Station is located on Highway 94 two miles (3 km) south of the Elbert County line between the Highway 94 bridge crossings of Little Horse Creek (milepost 43) and Horse Creek (milepost 46). The nearest U.S. Post Office is in Rush (ZIP Code 80833).
