= Gimhae City Hall station =

Station of the Busan Metro

14 김해시청 Gimhae City Hall
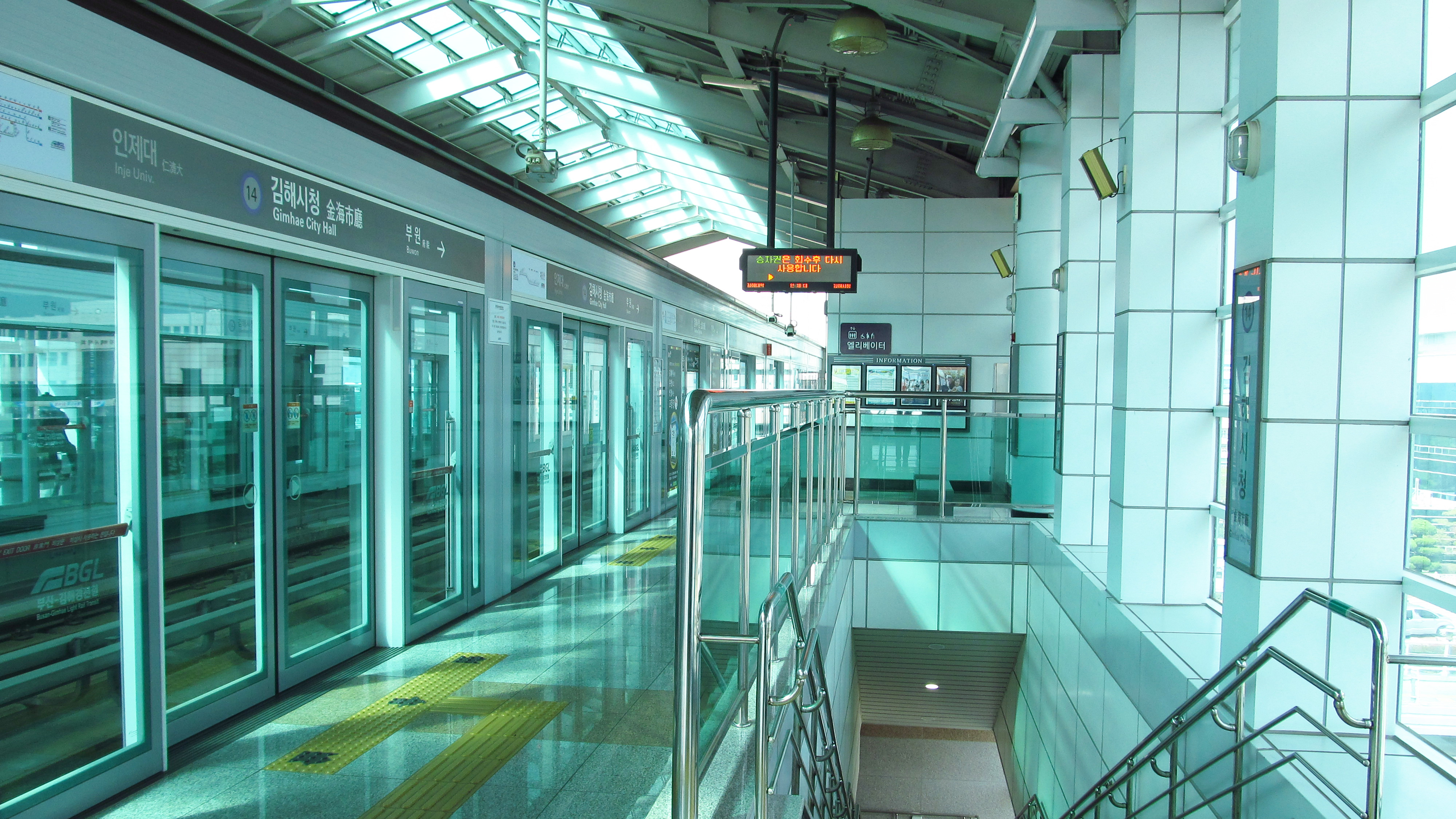

Korean name
- Hangul: 김해시청역
- Hanja: 金海市廳驛
- Revised Romanization: Gimhae Sicheong-yeok
- McCune–Reischauer: Kimhae Sich'ŏng-yŏk

General information
- Location: Buwon-dong, Gimhae; South Korea
- Coordinates: 35.2272°N 128.8903°E
- Operator: Busan–Gimhae Light Rail Transit Operation Corporation
- Line: Busan–Gimhae Light Rail Transit
- Platforms: 2
- Tracks: 2

Construction
- Structure type: Aboveground
- Cycle facilities: Yes
- Accessible: Yes

Other information
- Station code: 14

History
- Opened: September 16, 2011

Services
| Preceding station | Busan Metro | Following station |
|---|---|---|
| Inje University towards Sasang | Busan–Gimhae Light Rail Transit | Buwon towards Kaya University |
Location

Gimhae City Hall Station (Korean: 김해시청역) is a station of the BGLRT Line of Busan Metro in Buwon-dong, Gimhae, South Korea.

== Station Layout ==
| L2; Platforms | Side platform, doors will open on the right |
| L2; Platforms | Southbound | ← Busan–Gimhae LRT toward Sasang (Inje University) |
| L2; Platforms | Northbound | Busan–Gimhae LRT toward Kaya University (Buwon) → |
| L2; Platforms | Side platform, doors will open on the right |
| L1 | Concourse | Faregates, Shops, Vending machines, ATMs |
| G | Street Level |

== Exits ==
| Exit No. | Image | Destinations |
|---|---|---|
| 1 | | Gimhae City Vehicle Registration Office; Bus Stop |
| 2 | | Bus Stop |
