= Mount Pleasant City Hall (Iowa) =

- City Hall
- U.S. National Register of Historic Places
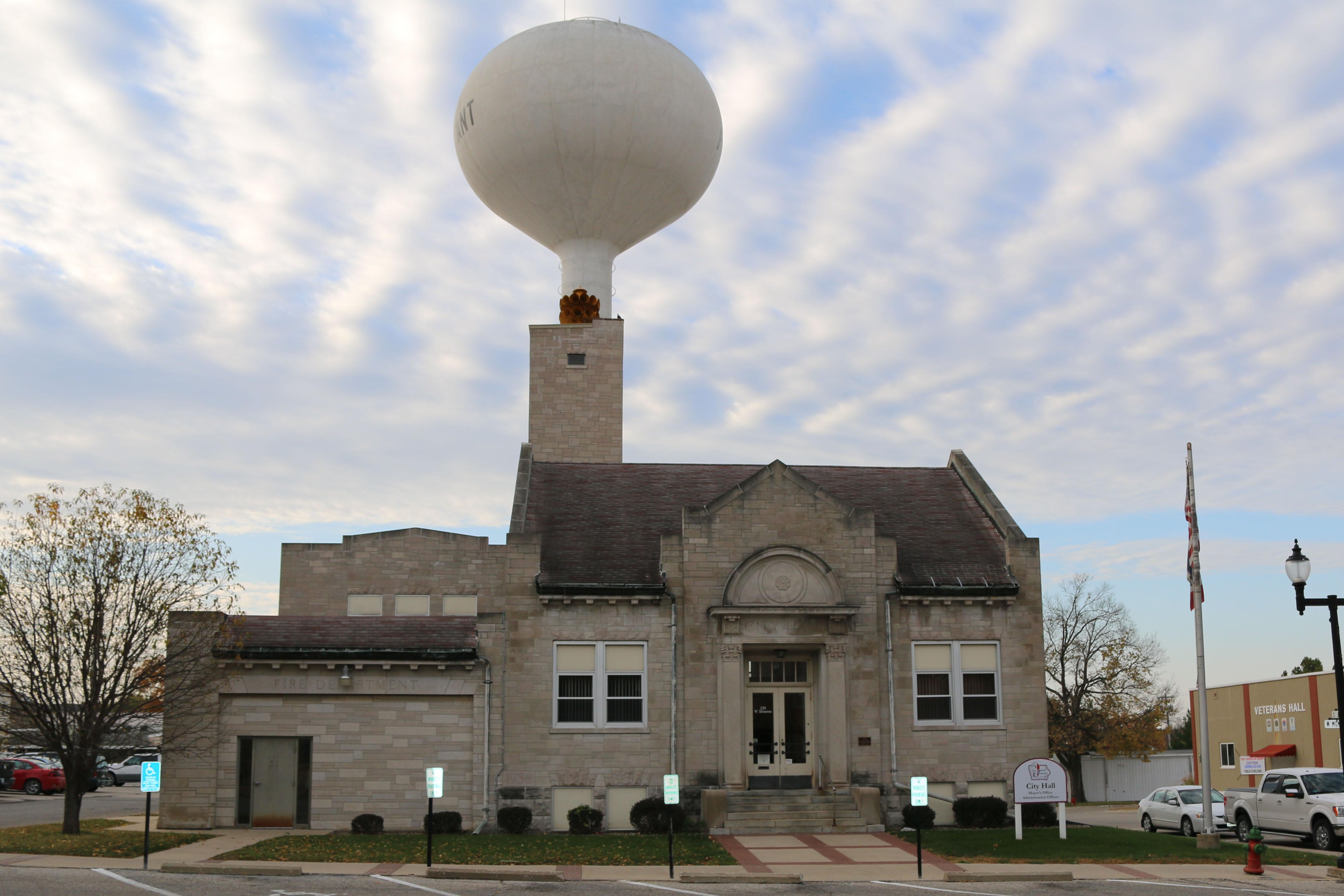

- Location within Iowa Location within the United States
- Location: 220 W. Monroe; Mount Pleasant, Iowa
- Coordinates: 40°57′59.8″N 91°33′20.7″W
- Area: less than one acre
- Built: 1936
- Built by: K.A. Bergdahl
- Architect: William Weibley
- Architectural style: Colonial Revival
- MPS: Mount Pleasant MPS
- NRHP reference No.: 91001120
- Added to NRHP: September 6, 1991

Mount Pleasant City Hall is the official seat of government of the city of Mount Pleasant, Iowa, United States.

From 1936 through 2016, Mount Pleasant City Hall was located at 220 W. Monroe Street, in a building listed on the National Register of Historic Places. This 1½-story stone structure was designed by Burlington, Iowa architect William Weibley, and constructed by local builder K.A. Bergdahl. It is an eclectic combination of Colonial Revival styles. For the most part it reflects Georgian Revival aesthetics with its symmetrical facade and the pilasters that flank the main entrance. The stepped ends of the gable roof and the projecting gable above the main entrance reflect the Dutch Revival influence. The random ashlar stone used in its construction was salvaged from the Seeley Memorial YMCA-high school that was destroyed in a 1932 fire. The city hall's construction in 1936 was a Works Progress Administration project. The east wing, which has been altered from its original appearance, originally housed the city's police and fire departments before they moved to their own buildings. City hall was listed on the National Register of Historic Places in 1991.

In 2016, Mount Pleasant City Hall relocated to 306 E. Monroe Street, about 5 blocks east of its previous location. It has been located there ever since, in a building that previously functioned as the Mount Pleasant High School, and which now also contains the Mount Pleasant Public Library. The original building at 220 W. Monroe Street is now under private ownership.
