= City Hall Square, Pamplona-Iruña (Spain) =

Udaletxe Plaza
- Square
- Plaza Consistorial
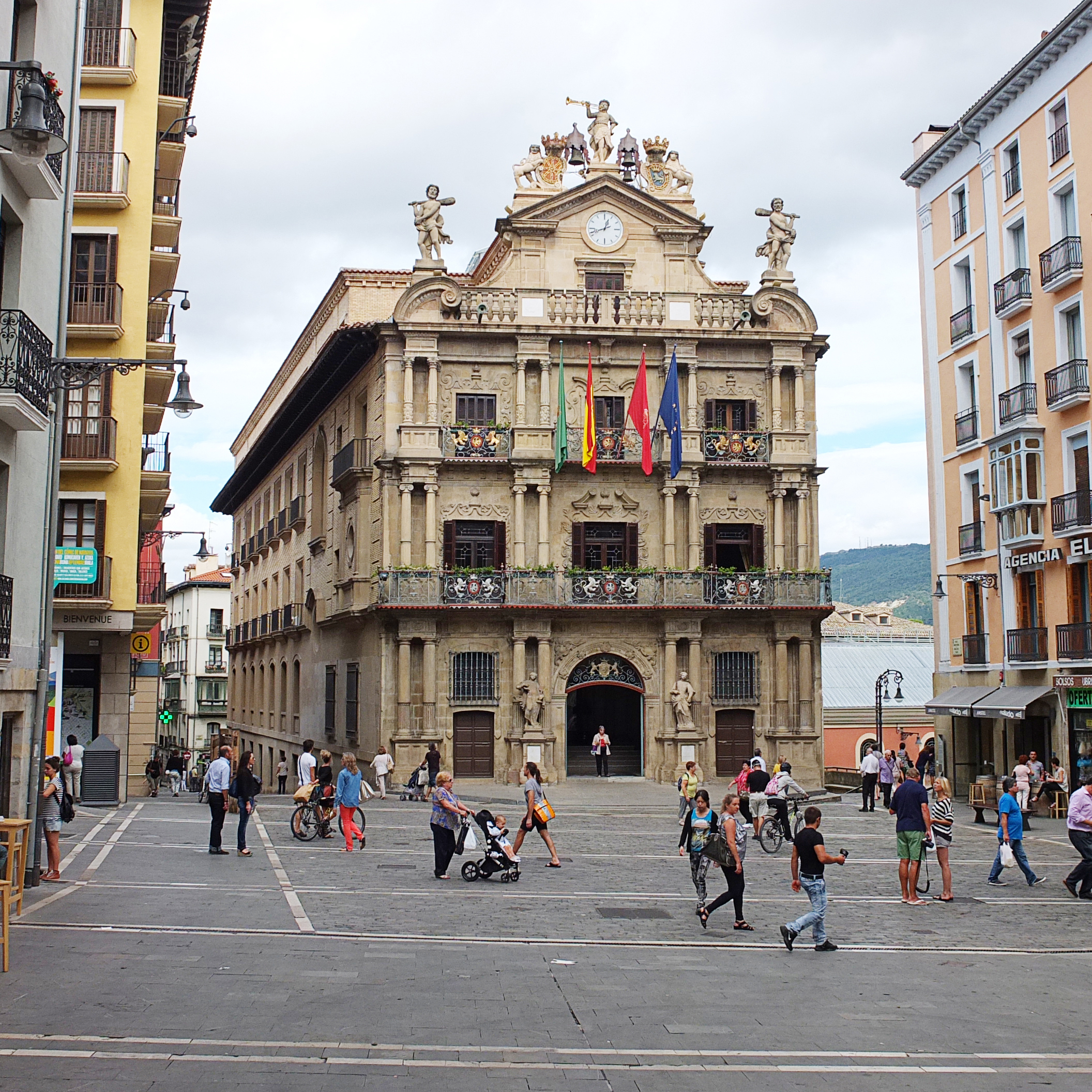
- The square at street level
- Location: Casco Antiguo/Alde Zaharra, Pamplona-Iruña, Navarre, Spain
- Interactive map of Udaletxe Plaza
- Coordinates: 42.818323°N 1.644018°W

Pamplona's Plaza Consistorial (in Spanish), also known in Basque as Udaletxe Plaza (“City Hall Square”), is a town square located adjacent to the Pamplona-Iruña City Hall in the heart of the Old Town of Pamplona-Iruña, Navarre, Spain.

The plaza is best known for its central role in the Festival of San Fermín. It serves as the stage for the festival’s lively opening ceremony, the txupinazo, on July 6th, and its emotional closing event, the Gaixoa Ni or Pobre de Mí, on July 14th. Each morning during the festival, the encierro—one of San Fermín's most iconic and perilous traditions—passes directly through the square, drawing thousands of spectators and participants into the heart of the Old Town.

== History ==
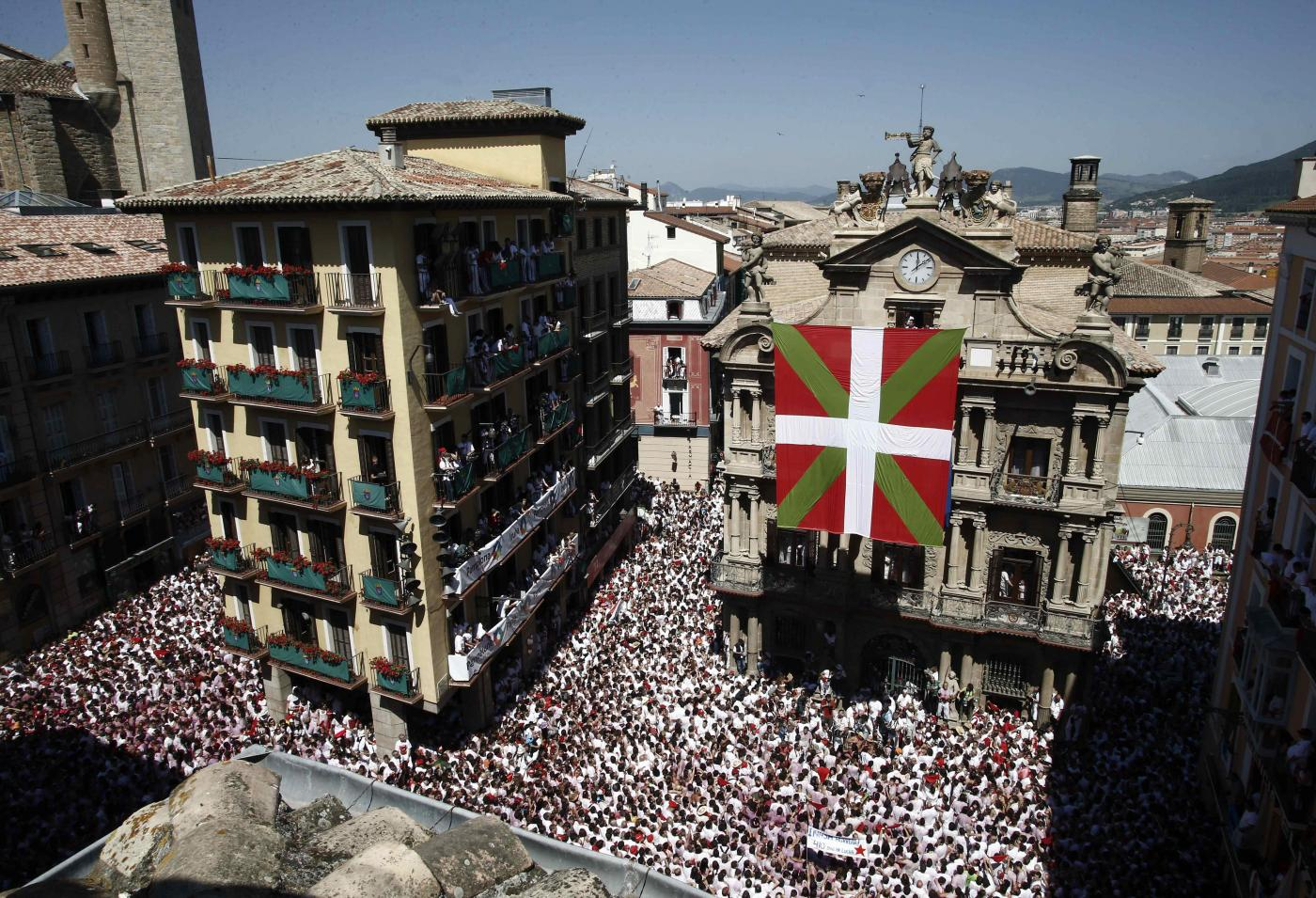
The square during 2013 San Fermin where four people unfurled a giant ikurrina, which delayed the txupinazo by 20 minutes and for which they were accused of public disorder.

The origins of Plaza Consistorial trace back to the Middle Ages. In 1423, King Charles III of Navarre sought to end the persistent hostilities among Pamplona-Iruña’s three independent burgos—Nabarreria, San Zernin (San Cernín), and San Nikolas (San Nicolás). To unify these rival jurisdictions, he issued the Batasun Pribilegioa (Privilegio de la Unión), a royal charter that merged the three into a single municipality governed by a common council, with shared taxes and a unified coat of arms. As part of the agreement, the internal fortifications separating the burgos were ordered demolished, though the city’s external defensive walls were preserved.

On the open ground where the three boroughs once converged, the new City Hall was constructed—a building that remains in use today. Alongside it, the square was established as a civic center.

== Location ==
It is located in the confluence between Santo Domingo, Mercaderes, San Zernin/San Cernin, Berria/Nueva, Zapateria and Calceteros streets, at 450 m (1,480 ft).

== See also ==
- Pamplona-Iruña
- Festival of San Fermin
