= Zionsville, Indiana =

- Town
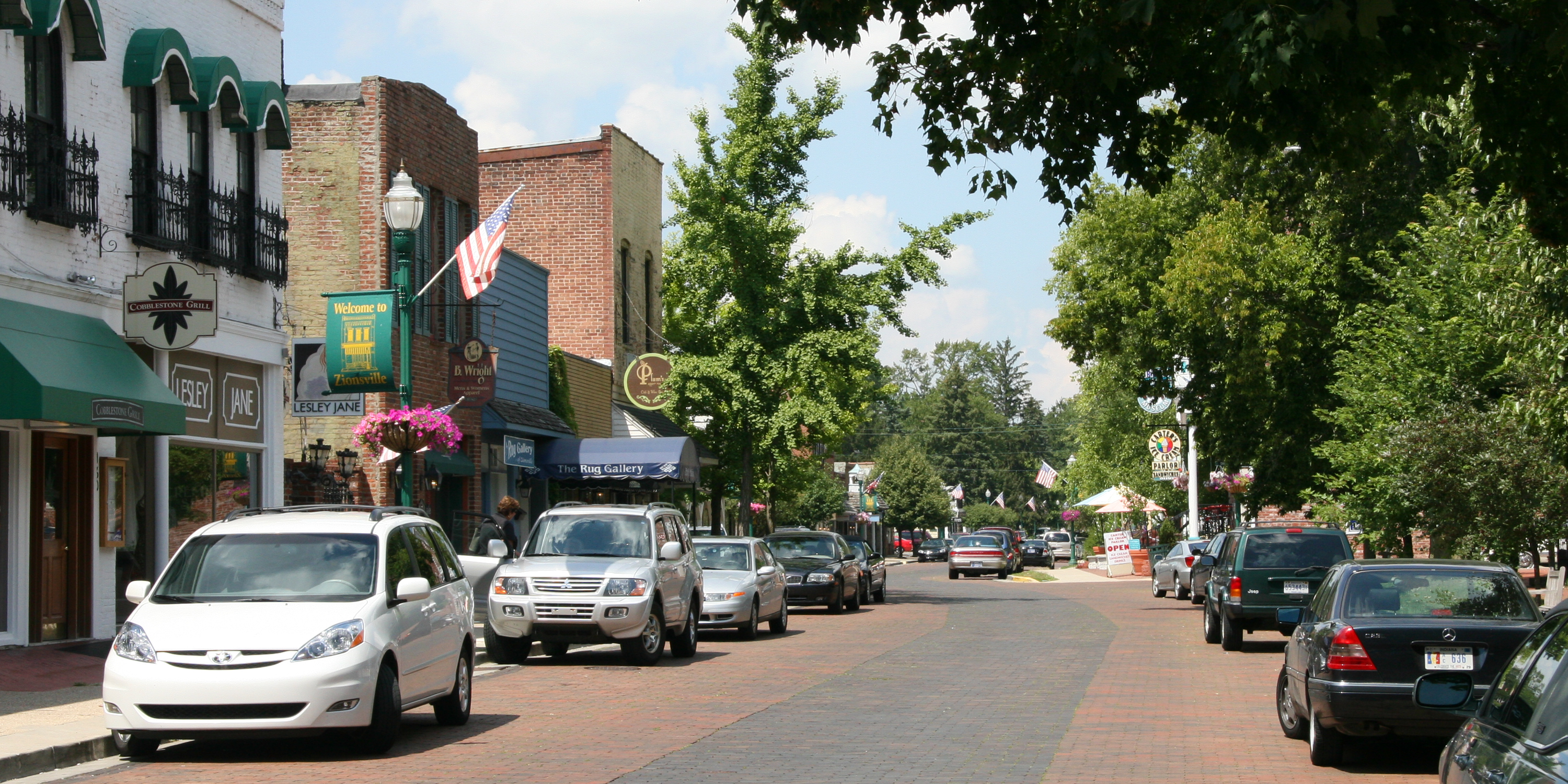
- Looking north along Main Street, 2008

- Flag Logo

- Location of Zionsville in Boone County, Indiana.
- Coordinates: 39°59′23″N 86°19′06″W
- Country: United States
- State: Indiana
- County: Boone
- Townships: Eagle, Union, Perry
- Established: 1852
- Incorporated: 1866

Government
  - Mayor: John Stehr (R)

Area
  - Total: 67.34 sq mi (174.41 km^{2})
  - Land: 67.22 sq mi (174.09 km^{2})
  - Water: 0.12 sq mi (0.32 km^{2})
- Elevation: 919 ft (280 m)

Population (2020)
  - Total: 30,603
  - Estimate (2025): 33,624
  - Density: 455.3/sq mi (175.79/km^{2})
- Time zone: UTC-5 (Eastern (EST))
  - Summer (DST): UTC-4 (EDT)
- ZIP code: 46077
- Area code: 317
- FIPS code: 18-86372
- GNIS feature ID: 2397761
- Website: zionsville-in.gov

Zionsville is a suburban town located in the southeast area of Boone County, Indiana, United States, northwest of Indianapolis. The population was 14,160 at the 2010 census and 30,693 at the 2020 census.

== History ==
Zionsville was laid out in 1852 when the railroad was extended to that point. It was named for William Zion, a pioneer settler.

Abraham Lincoln made a whistle-stop speech in Zionsville in 1861 when traveling to his inauguration. Later, after his assassination in 1865, the train carrying Lincoln's body passed through Zionsville on its circuitous route to his final rest in Springfield, Illinois.

In 1866, Zionsville was incorporated as a town.

Town Hall (Castle Hall) was listed on the National Register of Historic Places in 1983.

In the 1920s, the town was known as "The Dahlia City" due to the success of two nurseries in the area in growing the flower. Starting in 2019, the Zionsville Cultural District brought the name back to promote the city, in conjunction with giving away free flowers to grow and the painting of a mural.

== Geography ==
Zionsville is located approximately 15 miles (24 km) northwest of Downtown Indianapolis. According to the 2010 census, Zionsville has a total area of 10.298 square miles (26.67 km^{2}), of which 10.26 square miles (26.57 km^{2}) (or 99.63%) is land and 0.038 square miles (0.10 km^{2}) (or 0.37%) is water.

In 2010, Zionsville annexed 39.5 square miles (102.30 km^{2}) of land in Eagle and Union townships. This increased the area of the town to 49.7 square miles (128.72 km^{2}) and added 9,159 residents as of 2013. In 2014, Zionsville gained an additional 3.9 square miles (10.10 km^{2}) of area as a result of annexing portions of Perry Township, bringing the current area of the town to 53.63 square miles (138.90 km^{2}).

=== Climate ===
The climate in this area is characterized by hot, humid summers and cold winters. According to the Köppen Climate Classification system, Zionsville has a humid continental climate, abbreviated "Dfa" on climate maps. Its inclusion in this climatic type is because of its four distinct seasons, large ranges between high summer temperatures and low winter temperatures, and enough precipitation to exclude arid or semi-arid classification.

== Demographics ==
Historical population
Census	Pop.	Note	%±
1860	365		—
1870	956		161.9%
1880	855		−10.6%
1890	825		−3.5%
1900	765		−7.3%
1910	840		9.8%
1920	957		13.9%
1930	1,131		18.2%
1940	1,314		16.2%
1950	1,536		16.9%
1960	1,822		18.6%
1970	1,857		1.9%
1980	3,948		112.6%
1990	5,281		33.8%
2000	8,775		66.2%
2010	14,160		61.4%
2020	30,603		116.1%
2025 (est.)	33,624		9.9%
U.S. Decennial Census

=== 2020 census ===
As of the 2020 census, Zionsville had a population of 30,603. The population density was 455.3 inhabitants per square mile (175.8 inhabitants/km^{2}).

The median age was 39.9 years. 29.2% of residents were under the age of 18 and 14.5% of residents were 65 years of age or older. For every 100 females there were 97.1 males, and for every 100 females age 18 and over there were 92.7 males age 18 and over.

82.9% of residents lived in urban areas, while 17.1% lived in rural areas.

There were 10,645 households in Zionsville, of which 41.8% had children under the age of 18 living in them. Of all households, 69.3% were married-couple households, 10.4% were households with a male householder and no spouse or partner present, and 17.0% were households with a female householder and no spouse or partner present. About 18.9% of all households were made up of individuals and 9.2% had someone living alone who was 65 years of age or older. The average household size was 2.78 and the average family size was 3.06.

There were 11,187 housing units, of which 4.8% were vacant. The homeowner vacancy rate was 1.0% and the rental vacancy rate was 8.7%.

Racial composition as of the 2020 census
Race	Number	Percent
White	26,470	86.5%
Black or African American	587	1.9%
American Indian and Alaska Native	60	0.2%
Asian	1,330	4.3%
Native Hawaiian and Other Pacific Islander	10	0.0%
Some other race	310	1.0%
Two or more races	1,836	6.0%
Hispanic or Latino (of any race)	1,128	3.7%

=== Income and poverty ===
According to the 2016-2020 American Community Survey, the median income for a household in the town was $137,265, and the per capita income was $66,898. 3.8% of the population were estimated to be below the poverty line. The median value of owner-occupied housing units in the town was $406,800.

Males had a median income of $92,833 versus $65,622 for females.

=== 2010 census ===
As of the census of 2010, there were 14,160 people, 5,129 households, and 3,872 families living in the town. The population density was 1,380.1 inhabitants per square mile (532.9/km^{2}). There were 5,539 housing units at an average density of 539.9 per square mile (208.5/km^{2}). The racial makeup of the town was 94.0% White, 1.2% African American, 0.1% Native American, 2.7% Asian, 0.5% from other races, and 1.4% from two or more races. Hispanic or Latino of any race were 2.1% of the population.

There were 5,129 households, of which 44.1% had children under the age of 18 living with them, 66.9% were married couples living together, 6.5% had a female householder with no husband present, 2.1% had a male householder with no wife present, and 24.5% were non-families. 22.0% of all households were made up of individuals, and 8.8% had someone living alone who was 65 years of age or older. The average household size was 2.75 and the average family size was 3.25.

The median age in the town was 39.6 years. 31.6% of residents were under the age of 18; 4.6% were between the ages of 18 and 24; 23.2% were from 25 to 44; 29.6% were from 45 to 64; 10.9% were 65 years of age or older. The gender makeup of the town was 48.7% male and 51.3% female.

=== 2000 census ===
As of the census of 2000, there were 8,775 people, 3,063 households, and 2,407 families living in the town. The population density was 1,512.9 inhabitants per square mile (584.1/km^{2}). There were 3,169 housing units at an average density of 546.4 per square mile (211.0/km^{2}). The racial makeup of the town was 97.78% White, 0.33% African American, 0.11% Native American, 1.07% Asian, 0.32% from other races, and 0.39% from two or more races. Hispanic or Latino of any race were 0.97% of the population.

There were 3,063 households, out of which 45.5% had children under the age of 18 living with them, 70.5% were married couples living together, 6.8% had a female householder with no husband present, and 21.4% were non-families. 19.1% of all households were made up of individuals, and 7.5% had someone living alone who was 65 years of age or older. The average household size was 2.80 and the average family size was 3.23.

In the town, the population was spread out, with 31.7% under the age of 18, 4.2% from 18 to 24, 27.8% from 25 to 44, 25.6% from 45 to 64, and 10.7% who were 65 years of age or older. The median age was 38 years. For every 100 females, there were 93.1 males. For every 100 females age 18 and over, there were 86.8 males.

The median income for a household in the town was $81,770, and the median income for a family was $95,359. Males had a median income of $62,334 versus $35,823 for females. The per capita income for the town was $35,049.

== Government ==
Zionsville has utilized a mayor-council government since 2015, and is one of only two Indiana "towns" with a mayor. The current mayor, John Stehr, was elected in 2023, succeeding Emily Styron. The town council consists of 7 members, currently 6 Republicans and 1 Democrat.

=== List of mayors ===
No.	Portrait	Mayor	Term of office	Election	Party
1		Jeff Papa	June 2, 2015 – January 1, 2016	—	Republican
2		Tim Haak	January 1, 2016 – January 1, 2020	2015	Republican
3		Emily Styron	January 1, 2020 – January 1, 2024	2019	Democratic
4		John Stehr	January 1, 2024 – Incumbent	2023	Republican

== Education ==
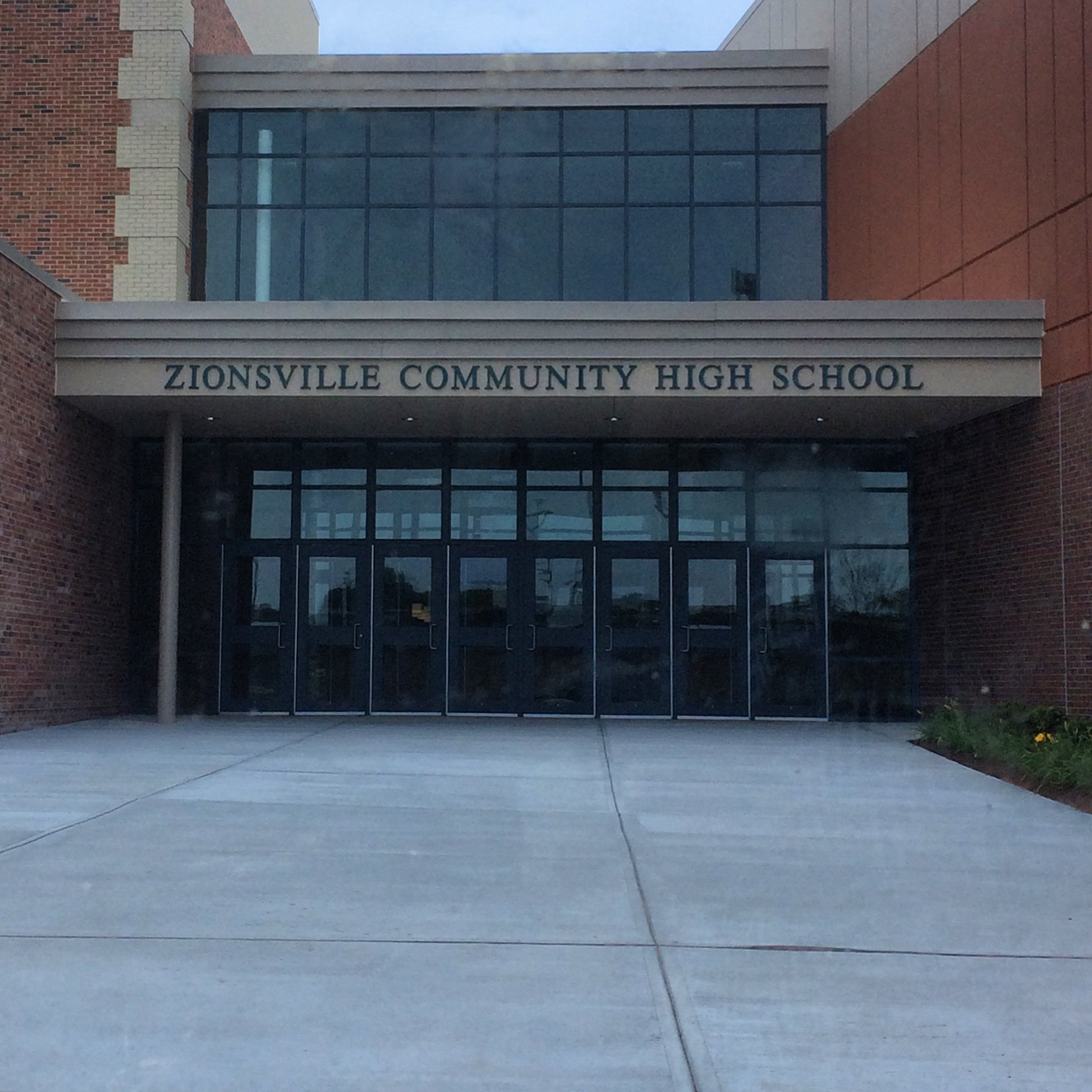
Zionsville Community High School

Zionsville Community Schools covers much of the town. Other parts of Zionsville are in the Lebanon Community School Corporation.

List of schools - Zionsville Community School Corporation

- Zionsville Community High School
- Zionsville Middle School
- Zionsville West Middle School
- Eagle Elementary School
- Pleasant View Elementary School
- Stonegate Elementary School
- Union Elementary School
- Boone Meadow Elementary School
- Trailside Elementary School

The Lebanon district's comprehensive high school is Lebanon Senior High School.

The town has a lending library, the Hussey-Mayfield Memorial Public Library.

== Cultural features ==
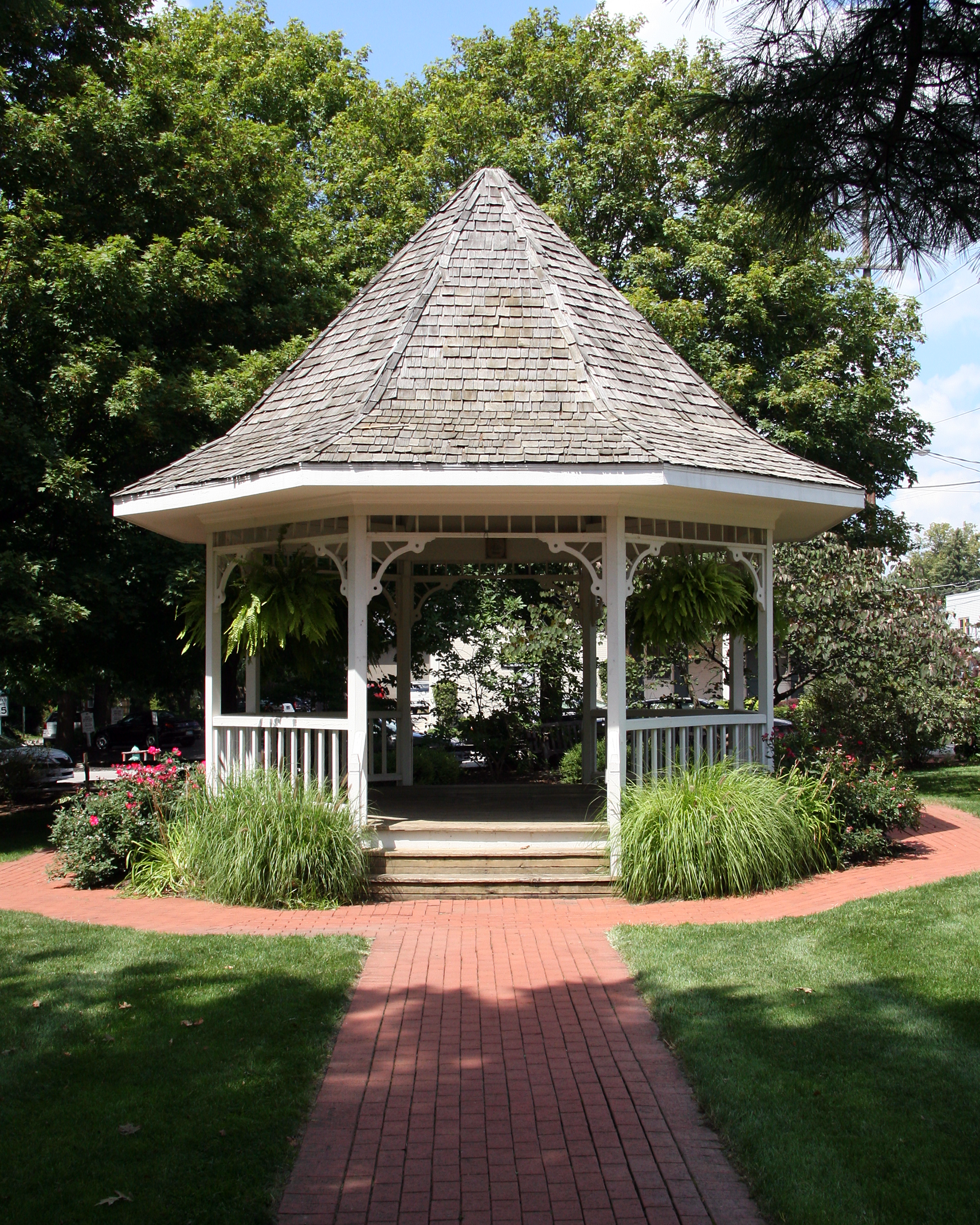
Gazebo at the site of the town's first railroad depot. Located in Lincoln Park.

Zionsville is home to the SullivanMunce Cultural Center, which includes the P.H. Sullivan Museum, Munce Art Center, a genealogy center, and a welcome center. It features a collection of artifacts related to the town's history and hosts numerous programming and events throughout the year.

One of Zionsville's seasonal attractions, the July Fourth fireworks show hosted by the local Lion's Club, brings in people from across Indiana. Unlike many of the Independence Day celebrations in major cities, the Zionsville fireworks show has no music integrated into the performance, although there are concerts before the display. There is also the Fall Festival which has a parade featuring sports teams, organizations from Zionsville and surrounding communities, and the Middle and High School marching bands. There is also a festival at the Lion's Park with attractions like rides, games, and food. It lasts for one weekend in September.

Zionsville contains the Goldman Union Camp Institute (or GUCI), a Jewish camp that is part of the URJ (Union for Reform Judaism).

== Transportation ==
=== Highways ===
- Interstate 65
- Interstate 465
- Interstate 865
- US 52 - concurrent with Interstate 65, 465, and 865
- US 421
- State Road 32
- State Road 267

=== Railroads and trails ===
The Lafayette and Indianapolis Railroad line traversing Zionsville was owned and operated by a number of companies from its inception in 1852 until it was abandoned in 1976. In the 1990s, Zionsville re-purposed portions of the former railroad line as a shared use path. It is currently known as Big-4 Rail Trail.

== Notable people ==
- Albert B. Anderson, federal judge
- Mark Baltz, NFL official
- Jeff Belskus, CEO of Hulman & Company and president of Indianapolis Motor Speedway
- Brandon Bernstein, American drag racer
- Antoine Bethea, former Indianapolis Colts and Arizona Cardinals safety
- Gary Brackett, former Indianapolis Colts linebacker
- Tom Carnegie, former announcer of the Indianapolis 500
- Dallas Clark, former Indianapolis Colts tight end
- Donald Cline, former fertility doctor
- Austin Collie, former Indianapolis Colts wide receiver
- Austin Croshere, former NBA player
- Dan Dakich, former Bowling Green State University basketball coach
- Ryan Diem, former Indianapolis Colts offensive tackle
- Jared Fogle, former Subway spokesman
- Danny Granger, former Indiana Pacers and Miami Heat small forward
- Stéphan Grégoire, race car driver
- Arthur G. Hansen, former president of Georgia Institute of Technology and Purdue University
- Grace Hartzel, fashion model
- Bill Hodges, college basketball coach, notably of the Indiana State Sycamores
- John-Michael Liles, Carolina Hurricanes NHL defenseman
- Tom Mastny, Cleveland Indians pitcher
- Derrick McKey, former NBA player
- Rob Morris, former Indianapolis Colts linebacker
- Elise Nieshalla, 58th Auditor of Indiana
- Nancy Noel, artist
- Chuck Pagano, former Indianapolis Colts head coach
- Metta World Peace, former Indiana Pacers Forward
- Kendall Phillips, country music singer
- Jerraud Powers, former Indianapolis Colts defensive back
- Jeff Saturday, former Indianapolis Colts and Green Bay Packers center
- David Shumate, poet
- Hunter Smith, former Indianapolis Colts punter
- Rik Smits, former Indiana Pacers center
- John Stehr, former WTHR news anchor, current Mayor
- Lance Stephenson, former NBA player
- Brad Stevens, Boston Celtics president of basketball operations
- Hardress Nathaniel Swaim, federal judge
- Jacob Tamme, former Indianapolis Colts and Denver Broncos tight end
- Jack Trudeau, former NFL quarterback
- Kelly Williamson, triathlete
- Todd Witsken, professional tennis player
