= Jangyu, Gimhae =

Area of Gimhae, South Korea

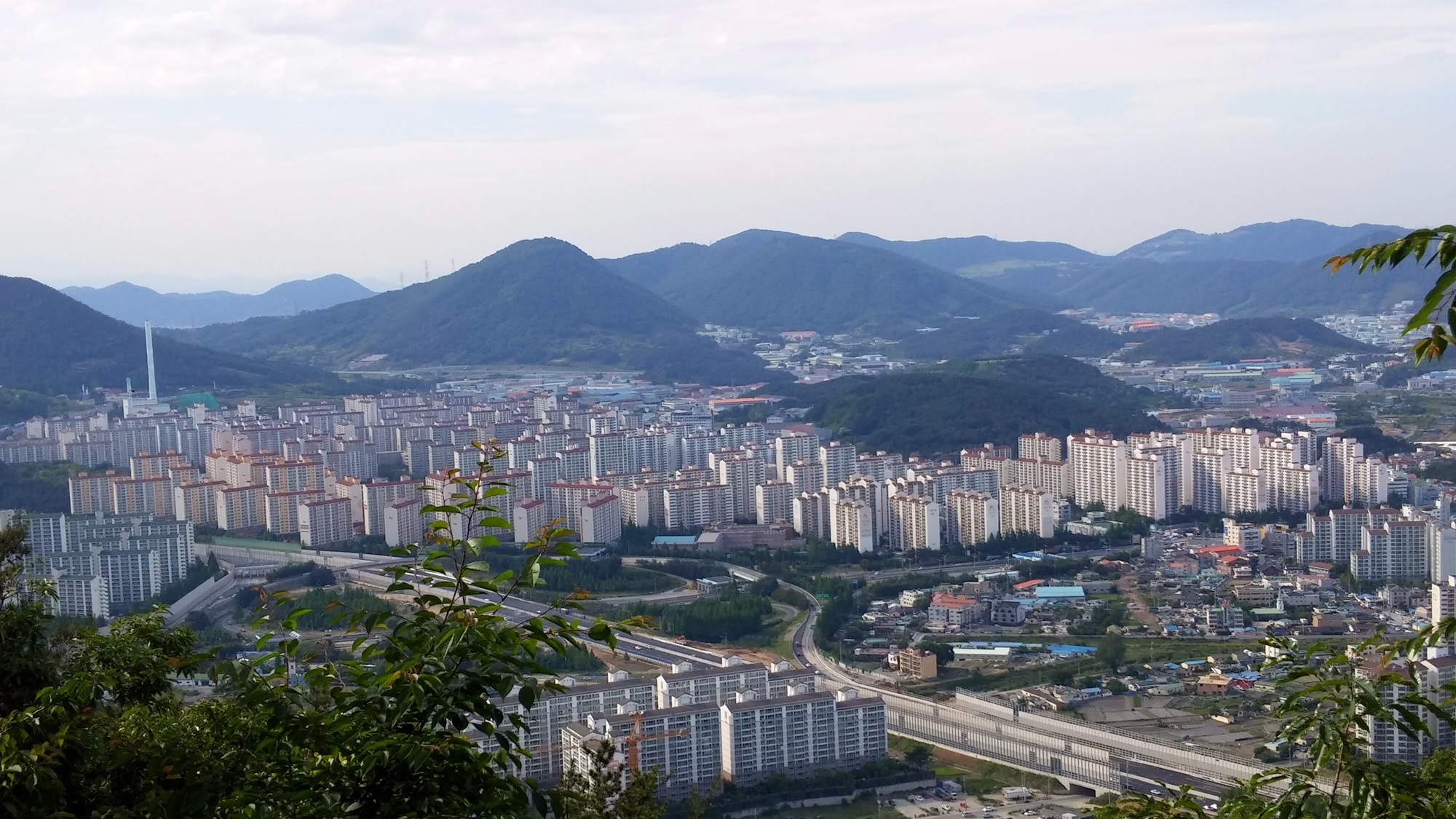
Jangyu urban area viewed from Ballyongsan

Jangyu (Korean: 장유; Hanja: 長有) is an area located at the southern tip of Gimhae, South Gyeongsang Province, South Korea. Currently, three administrative dongs (Jangyu 1, 2, and 3-dong) govern a total of 12 legal dongs. The total area spans 55.18 km^{2}, with Jangyu 1-dong covering 13.51 km^{2}, Jangyu 2-dong covering 19.72 km^{2}, and Jangyu 3-dong covering 21.97 km^{2}.

To the north, it borders Jillye-myeon and Juchon-myeon of Gimhae. To the south, it is adjacent to Jinhae District, Changwon and Gangseo District, Busan with Guramsan Mountain between them. To the west, it borders Seongsan District, Changwon across the mountain Bulmosan, and to the east, it borders Chilsanseobu-dong of Gimhae and Gangseo-gu, Busan across the Joman-gang River. The Yulha-cheon and Daecheong-cheon streams flow through the urban center of Jangyu. Ballyongsan Mountain sits in the heart of Jangyu, while Yongjibong Peak, Bulmosan Mountain, and Guramsan Mountain form a continuous mountain ridge along the western and southern boundaries.

The toponym 'Jangyu' (長遊) first appeared during the Geumgwan Gaya period, when Jangyu-chon (長遊村) village was formed at the western foot of Bulmosan Mountain. During the Goryeo dynasty, villages named Jangyu-chon (長遊村), Yuha-chon (柳下村), and Jeeulmi-hyang (齋乙彌鄕, Jeolmi-hyang) were established. In the Joseon dynasty, the area was referred to as Yuha-myeon (柳下面) and Yudeongya-myeon (柳等也面). In 1885, during the reign of Emperor Gojong, Jangyu-myeon was officially established, which was subsequently divided into 8 ris of Jangyu-myeon and 4 ris of Sunam-myeon (水南面) in 1888. It became part of Gimhae County (Gimhae-gun), Gyeongsangnam-do in 1896. During the Japanese colonial period in 1914, Sunam-myeon was merged into Jangyu-myeon following the administrative district reorganization (Bugunmyeon tongpyehap).

In 1996, the Korea Land Corporation launched a project to develop the Jangyu New Town in Jangyu-myeon, Gimhae. Following the massive influx of apartment residents since the 2000s, the population experienced rapid growth. Consequently, the Gimhae Municipal Government initiated preparations in 2007 to convert Jangyu-myeon into urban dongs. The population surpassed 100,000 in 2008 and 120,000 in 2010, outgrowing the entire populations of cities like Miryang and Sacheon. On July 1, 2013, Jangyu-myeon was officially reorganized into three administrative dongs—Jangyu 1, 2, and 3-dong—and its 12 legal ris (里) were simultaneously converted into 12 legal dongs (洞).

Namhae Expressway Branch 2, which connects with National Route 58, and Local Route 1020 run through the urban center, with the Jangyu IC located in the middle of the city providing direct connectivity between the highway and local roads. Local Route 1030 (part of Namhaean-daero), the Bulmosan Tunnel, and Daecheong IC on Namhae Expressway Branch 3 serve as critical links connecting Gimhae Jangyu with Changwon.

Key commercial hubs in the Jangyu area include Jangyu Central Market, established in 1960, and the Gimhae Agricultural and Marine Products Wholesale Market, which opened in 2005. The Gimhae Municipal Government operates the Jangyu Branch Office to oversee the area's administration. Additionally, public safety and security are managed by the Jangyu District Office under the Gimhae Seobu Police Station, while fire and rescue services are handled by the Gimhae Seobu fire Station

== History ==
=== Gaya Period ===
The name 'Jangyu' originates from Jangyu Hwasang (長遊和尙) Heo Bo-ok (許寶玉), who was the brother-in-law of King King Suro (Garakguk) and the older brother of Queen Heo Hwang-ok. Turning his back on wealth and honor, Jangyu Hwasang entered Bulmosan Mountain to practice asceticism. As he never returned to the secular world, people remarked that he was living in "Jangyu" (長遊, meaning enjoying great freedom). The mountain where Jangyu Hwasang built the Jangyu-sa (長遊寺) Temple was originally named Jangyu-san Mountain (長遊山, currently Taejeongsan Mountain).

=== Goryeo and Joseon Dynasties ===
Following the establishment of Gimhae-bu (金海府) in 971 (the 22nd year of King Gwangjong's reign during the Goryeo dynasty), villages such as Jangyu-chon (長遊村), Yuha-chon (柳下村), and Jeeulmi-hyang (齋乙彌鄕, Jeolmi-hyang) were formed on the western slopes of Jangyu-san Mountain. According to Feng shui, Yuha-chon was named after its auspicious geography called Yuji-aengso (柳技鶯巢, resembling a nightingale's nest built on a willow branch), which was believed to grant numerous descendants and see six lineages pass the imperial civil service examinations. Jeeulmi-hyang originated from 'Jelmi Village', a special administrative village that existed in Neongdong Village, Sammun-dong (formerly Sammun-ri, Jangyu-myeon) since the late Silla period. The name is presumed to have derived from 'Jeol-myeo' or 'Jeol-mi', meaning a mountain climbing up to a temple ('Jeol' in Korean).

During the mid-Joseon period, when the area belonged to Gimhae Dohobu (金海都護府) of Gyeongsang-do, it was called Yudeongya-myeon (柳等也面), and was colloquially referred to in native Korean as 'Baedeuri', 'Baenadeuri', or 'Beodeungi'. The names 'Baedeuri' and 'Baenadeuri' stemmed from the historical period when the Joman-gang River had high water levels, allowing boats to come and go at a ferry terminal in front of the village. This was later transliterated via Chaja orthography into 'Beodeungi' and 'Yuha' (柳下), both meaning "beneath the willow trees." From 1616 (the 8th year of King Gwanghaegun's reign) to 1656 (the 7th year of King Hyojong's reign), a special military administrative outpost called Sinmun-jin (新門鎭) or Somo-jin (召募鎭, a temporary enlistment outpost) was stationed at Jingol Village (鎭谷, Jingok) in Yongsan Village, Sinmun-dong (formerly Sinmun-ri, Jangyu-myeon). In the yeojidoseo (與地圖書), compiled between 1757 and 1765 during the reign of King King Yeongjo, Yudeongya-myeon was recorded as part of Gimhae-jin Gimhae Dohopeobu. The Hoguchongsu (戶口總數), published in 1789 during the 13th year of King King Jeongjo's reign, specified that Yudeongya-myeon governed 18 lower-level administrative ris: Bukpo (北浦), Hason (下孫), Bugok (釜谷), Yudeongya (柳等也), Naedeok (內德), Waedeok (外德), Geomulso (巨勿所), Sinmun (新門), Geonlim (件林), Daecheong (大淸), Jemyeo (濟旀), Sangjeom (上店), Sagijeom (沙器店), Deokjeong (德亭), Jeokhang (赤項), Gwandong (寬洞), Jangyu (長遊), and Taejang (台長).

The area's name was changed to Yuha-myeon (柳下面) in 1810 (the 10th year of King King Sunjo), but reverted to Yudeongya-myeon in 1879 (the 16th year of King Gojong). In 1885 (the 22nd year of King Gojong), Jangyu-myeon was officially established. Later, in 1888, it was subdivided into 8 ris of Jangyu-myeon (Bugok (釜谷), Yuha (柳下), Naedeok (內德), Mugye (茂溪), Daecheong (大淸), Sammun (三文), Sinmun (新文), Gwandong (寬洞)) and 4 ris of Sunam-myeon (水南面) (Yulha (栗下), Jangyu (長有), Eungdal (應達), Suga (水佳)). Following the introduction of the 23-bu system in 1895, it became part of Gimhae-gun under Jinju-bu, and was subsequently reassigned to Gyeongsangnam-do Gimhae-gun when the 13-do system was implemented in 1896.

=== Japanese Colonial Period and Modern Era ===
During the reorganization of administrative districts during the Japanese colonial period in 1914, Sunam-myeon was absorbed into Jangyu-myeon through the municipal mergers. After national liberation, it remained a part of Gimhae-gun, Gyeongsangnam-do, until May 10, 1995, when the consolidation of Gimhae City and Gimhae County formed the unified Gimhae City's Jangyu-myeon. Amid the development of the Busan-Gyeongnam Racecourse (now Let's Run Park Busan Gyeongnam] in the 1990s, Gadong Village in Suga-ri, Jangyu-myeon was integrated into Beombang-dong, Gangseo-gu, Busan on January 12, 2000; conversely, Jangjeon Village, which previously belonged to Gangseo-gu, Busan, was incorporated into Jangyu-myeon. On July 1, 2013, Jangyu-myeon was officially split into three administrative dongs (Jangyu 1, 2, and 3-dong), elevating its 12 legal ris (里) into 12 legal dongs (洞).

== Geography ==
Extreme Cardinal Points of Gimhae
Direction	Legal Division	Extreme Point Coordinates
Easternmost	Daedong-myeon Wolchon-ri	35°16′16″N 129°0′48″E
Westernmost	Jinyeong-eup Jwagon-ri	35°18′12″N 129°0′48″E
Southernmost	Jangyu-dong	35°9′10″N 128°49′44″E
Northernmost	Saengnim-myeon Doyo-ri	35°23′21″N 128°51′59″E

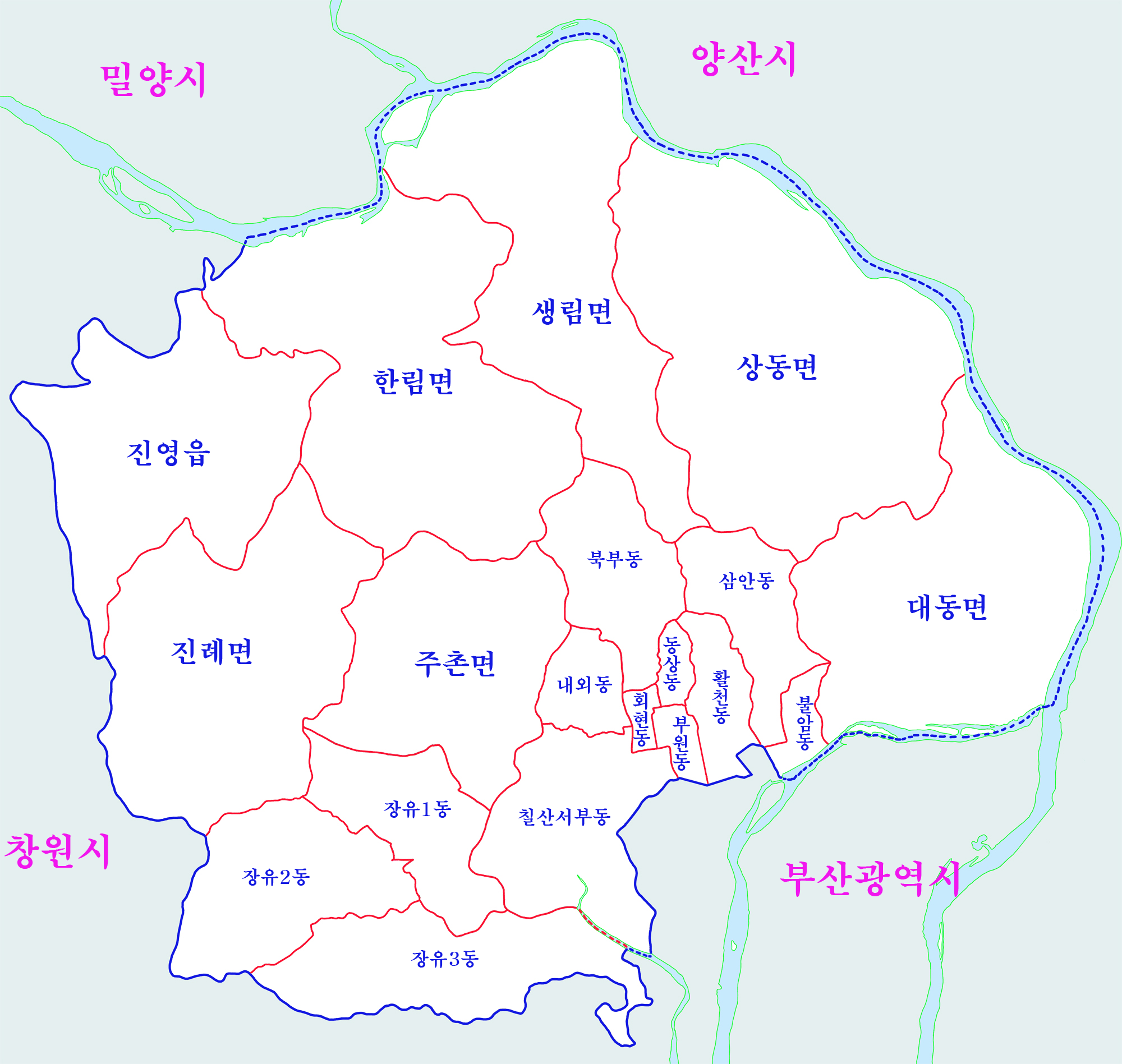
Administrative map of Gimhae. The Jangyu area is located at the southern tip of the city.

Jangyu-dong is situated at the southern end of Gimhae. The area of Jangyu 1-dong is 13.51 km^{2}, Jangyu 2-dong is 19.72 km^{2}, and Jangyu 3-dong is 21.97 km^{2}, totaling 55.18 km^{2}. It shares borders with Jillye-myeon and Juchon-myeon of Gimhae to the north, Jinhae-gu, Changwon and Gangseo-gu, Busan to the south across Guramsan Mountain, Seongsan-gu, Changwon to the west across Bulmosan Mountain, and Chilsanseobu-dong of Gimhae and Gangseo-gu, Busan to the east across the Joman-gang River. Within its jurisdiction, local streams such as Daecheong-cheon and Yulha-cheon flow through the urban core. The Gimhae Municipal Government is currently executing an ecological restoration initiative for these two streams. The upstream portion of Daecheong-cheon forms the Jangyu Daecheong Valley, a highly popular summer vacation spot. The Korea Tourism Organization has highlighted it as the "representative valley of Gimhae."

Ballyongsan Mountain, standing 236 meters tall, is located in the middle of the city, stretching across parts of Daecheong-dong, Gwandong-dong, and Sinmun-dong.

According to the Gimhae Urban Management Plan Decision (Modification) official gazette published by the Governor of Gyeongsangnam-do in October 2008, the designated residential zone in Jangyu-myeon at the time was 6,206,142 m^{2}, commercial zone was 1,672,992 m^{2}, industrial zone was 1,779,938 m^{2}, and green zone was 44,945,184 m^{2}, with no areas designated as managed, agricultural, or environmental conservation zones.

=== Administrative Divisions ===
The legal dongs governed by the respective administrative dongs of Jangyu 1, 2, and 3-dong are listed below:

List of Legal Dongs by Administrative Dong

Jangyu 1-dong

- Naedeok-dong
- Mugye-dong
- Bugok-dong
- Sinmun-dong
- Yuha-dong

Jangyu 2-dong

- Daecheong-dong
- Sammun-dong

Jangyu 3-dong

- Gwandong-dong
- Suga-dong
- Jangyu-dong
- Yulha-dong
- Eungdal-dong

== Population and Conversion to Urban Dongs ==
According to demographic data recorded by Gimhae City as of late December 2020, the population of Jangyu 1-dong stood at 57,416, Jangyu 2-dong at 36,753, and Jangyu 3-dong at 72,208, accumulating to a combined total of roughly 166,000 residents. Since a significant portion of Jangyu's residents commute to workplaces in other areas including Changwon, traffic conditions along the Changwon Tunnel on Local Route 1020—the primary commuting corridor at the time—were heavily cited as a decisive factor capable of shifting public votes during the 2011 South Korean by-elections.

The Jangyu New Town project, initially undertaken by the Korea Land Corporation in 1996, saw massive residential move-ins throughout the 2000s. The population exceeded 100,000 in 2008 while still categorized as a myeon, and surpassed 120,000 by 2010, eclipsing the total populations of nearby administrative cities like Miryang and Sacheon. Anticipating that rural myeon-level administrations would struggle to keep up with the soaring administrative demand, Gimhae City initiated preparations for a formal transition into urban dongs in 2007, despite facing pushback from some residents concerned about the reduction of rural-area tax benefits. Initial blueprints proposed splitting the region into four dongs, which was scaled down to a two-dong plan by 2012. However, accommodating civil criticisms against the two-dong division, the city council evaluated a new plan in late 2011 to partition the area into three dongs: Jangyu 1-dong centered on Bugok-ri and Mugye-ri, Jangyu 2-dong centered on Sammun-ri, and Jangyu 3-dong centered on Yulha-ri. This three-dong proposal officially passed the city council on July 24, 2012, confirming the structural split.

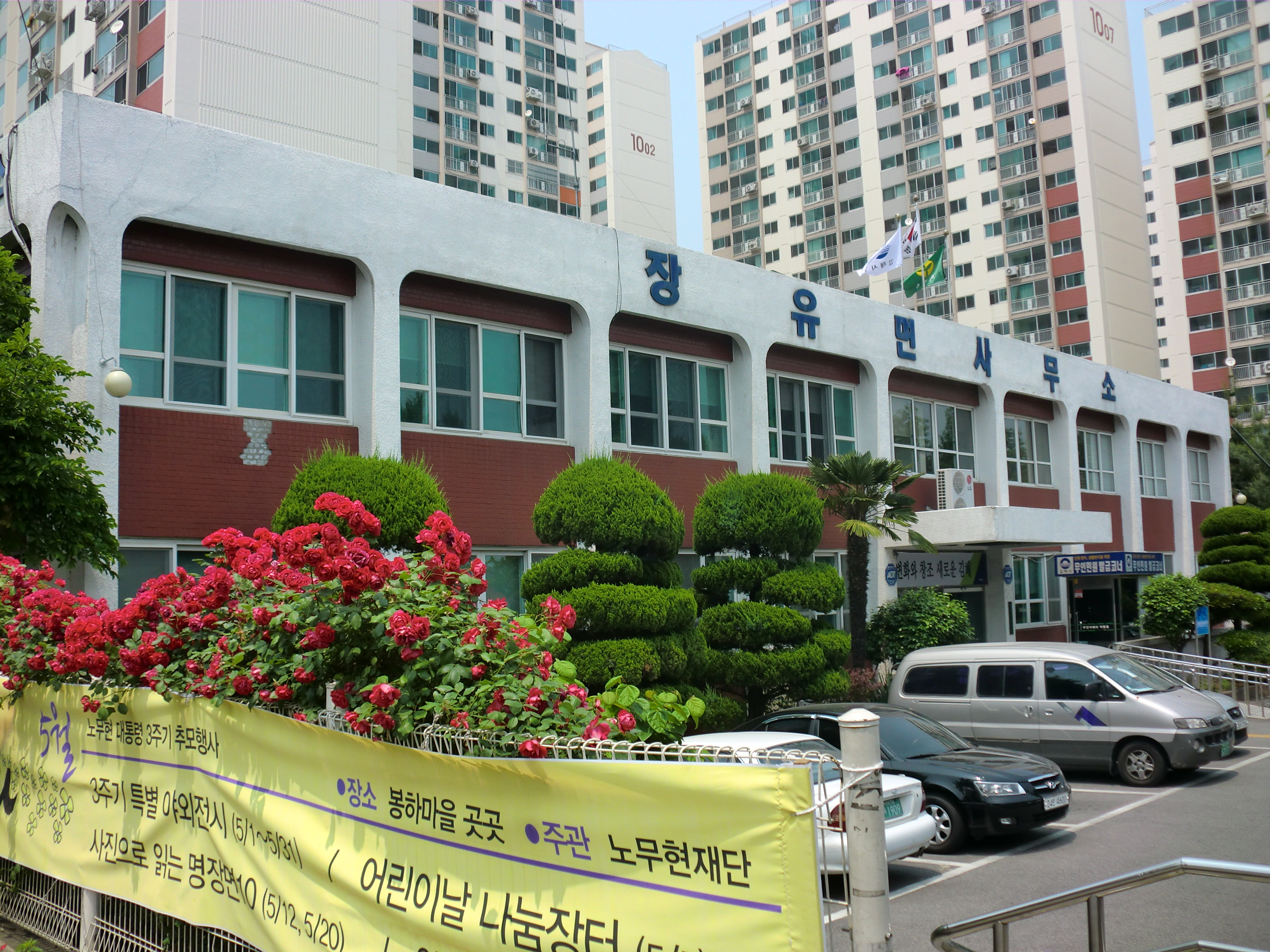
The old Jangyu-myeon office building photographed in 2012. This facility was demolished and rebuilt as the Jangyu 1-dong Community Center.

== Transportation ==
The Namhai Expressway Branch 2 and Local Route 1020 cross through the urban area, with the Jangyu IC positioned directly at the city center to link the highway to local routes. Both arteries interface with National Route 58, which serves as a vital transport link between central Gimhae and Jangyu. Due to heavy gridlocks at the Changwon Tunnel during peak hours on Local Route 1020, Local Route 1030 (part of Namhaean-daero) and the Bulmosan Tunnel were opened as private toll roads in 2012 to siphon traffic away. The remaining segments were completed on December 5, 2015, extending direct vehicle accessibility into Busan. Furthermore, a six-lane wide-area highway connecting Sinmun-dong with the Busan New Port hinterland highway opened in 2014. The Namhae Expressway Branch 3, opened on January 13, 2017, also integrates into the area via the Daecheong IC.

Directly following the initial construction of Jangyu New Town, complex distance surcharges applied to taxi commutes between central Gimhae and Jangyu. In 2003, 38 villages across 7 ris inside Jangyu-myeon were exempted from this extra fare policy, and the surcharge framework was eliminated for the entirety of Jangyu-myeon in 2004.

Regarding Gimhae's intra-city bus services, Route 21 originates from the Oedong Gimhae Intercity Bus Terminal, crossing the Yulha District to loop back at Jangyu-dong, alongside Route 21-1 which runs through Juchon-myeon (terminating near the Jangyu Nonghyup Bank in Mugye-dong). Route 3-1 deploys out of the Oedong depot via Chilsanseobu-dong, Sinmun-dong, and Yulha-dong before turning back. Route 23 links the Mugye depot to Suga-dong via Yulha-dong, whereas Route 24 services the area between the Mugye depot and the Gwandong-dong Seyoung Richel Apartments. Routes 25 and 26 operate as mirrored circular routes connecting prime targets in Jangyu New Town and Yulha New Town, basing their turnaround loops at the Lotte Water Park in Sinmun-dong. Furthermore, Routes 58, 59, 97, and 98 navigate through Jangyu to link central Gimhae with Changwon, and Route 44 connects Jinyeong-eup and Oedong via Jangyu. Intercity express options 220 and 221 operate as shared-fare seat-buses operated jointly with Busan city bus operator Taeyoung Bus to link Jangyu to Hadan Station (Busan Metro Line 1). Changwon city transit Route 170 additionally links Jangyu directly with metropolitan Changwon.

For intercity long-distance buses, no dedicated terminal building currently exists; instead, an outdoor street-side transit stop in front of the head office of Jangyu Nonghyup serves as the improvised boarding platform (see the Jangyu Intercity Bus Terminal page for details). Because travelers must wait exposed to weather on the pavement, criticisms persist regarding the necessity of an indoor station matching the district's high population. Although a formal commercial plot had been reserved for an intercity terminal within the Mugye Urban Development Zone as early as December 2004, private construction financing has yet to materialize.

On the rail network, Jangyu StationJangyu Station on the Busan New Port Line is located in Naedeok-dong, but it is closed to active passenger operations. However, it is scheduled to serve as a passenger stop along the upcoming Bujeon–Masan Double Track Railway

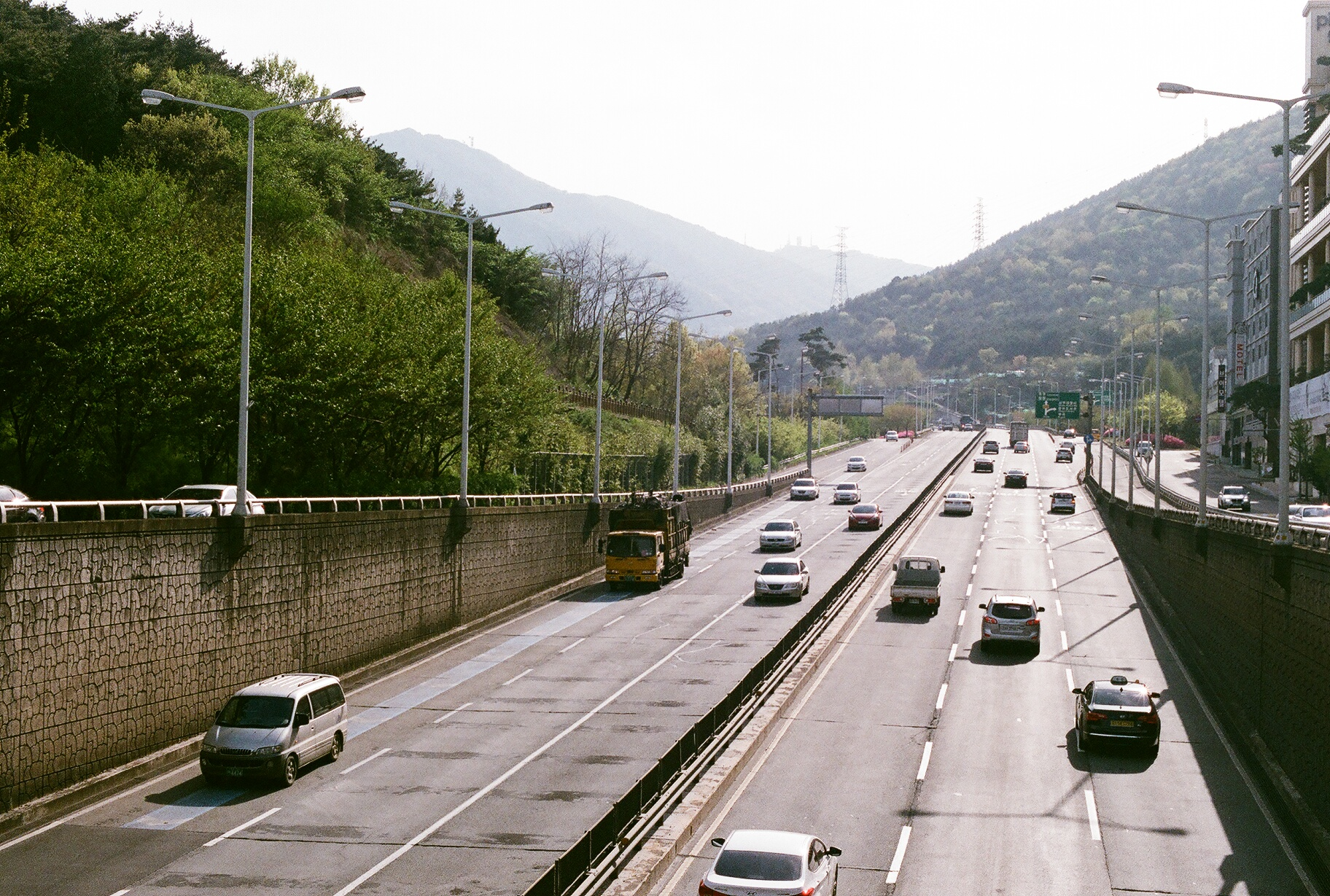
Local Route 1020, near Daecheong Underpass.

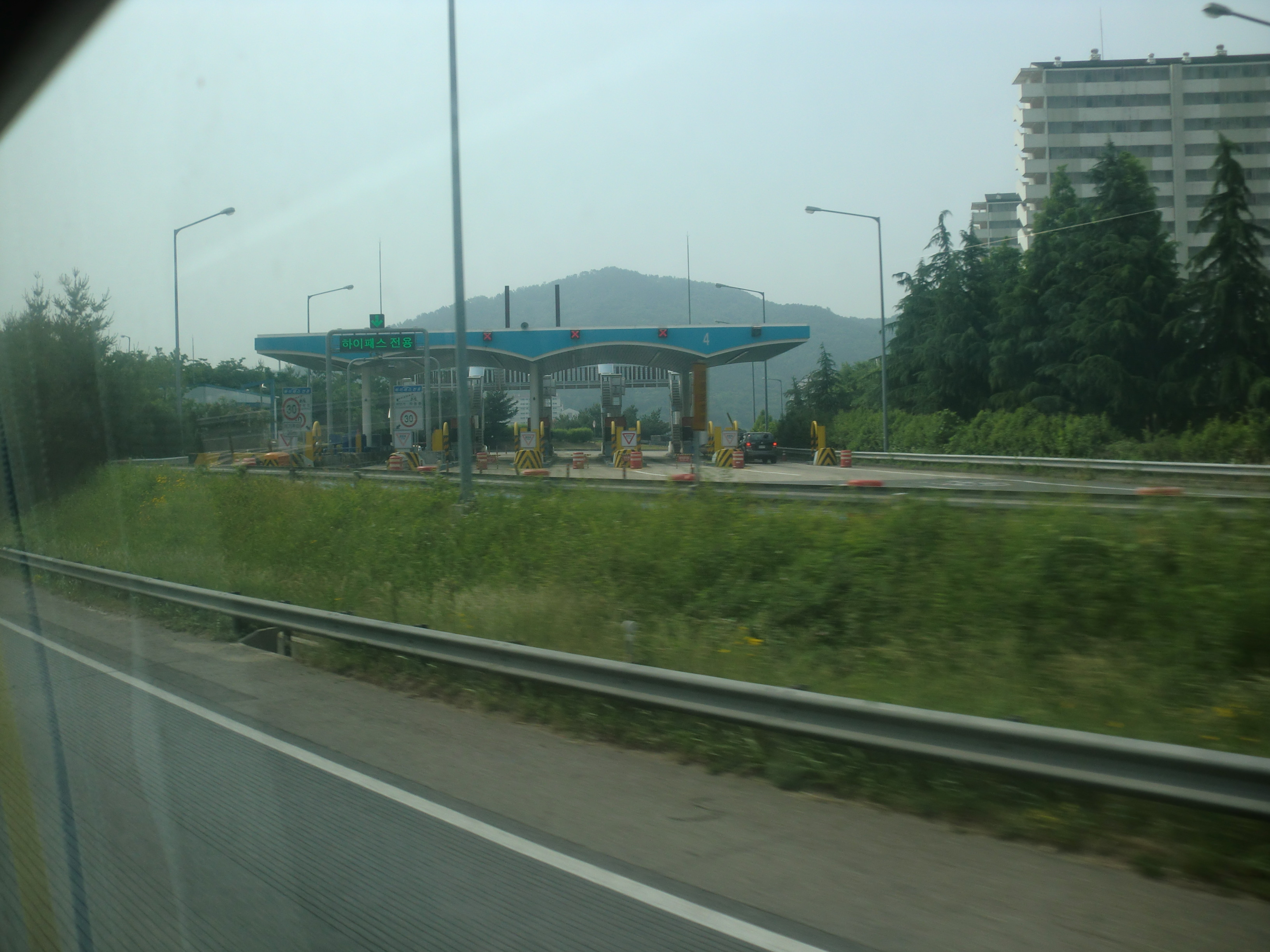
Jangyu IC exit toward Changwon, which connects directly to the local route.

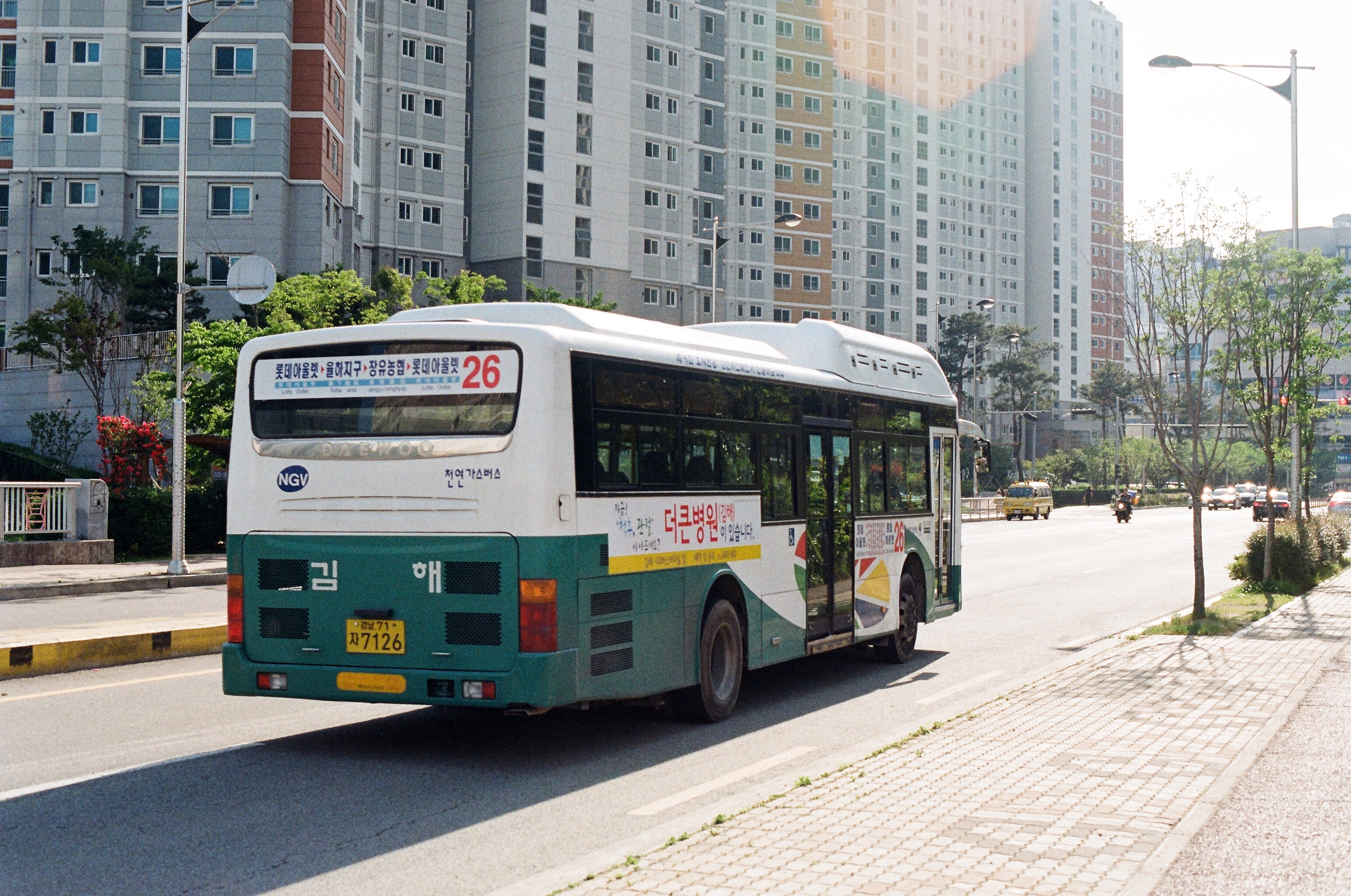
Gimhae city bus Route 26.

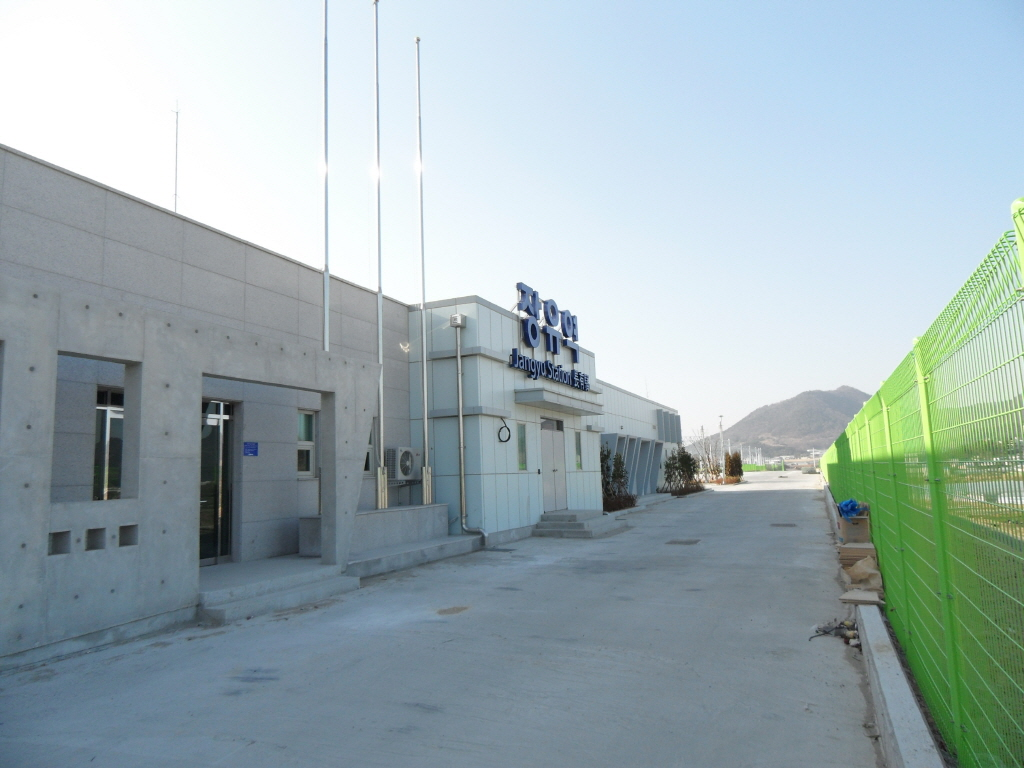
The station building of Jangyu Station on the Busan New Port Line.

== Environment ==
=== Streams ===
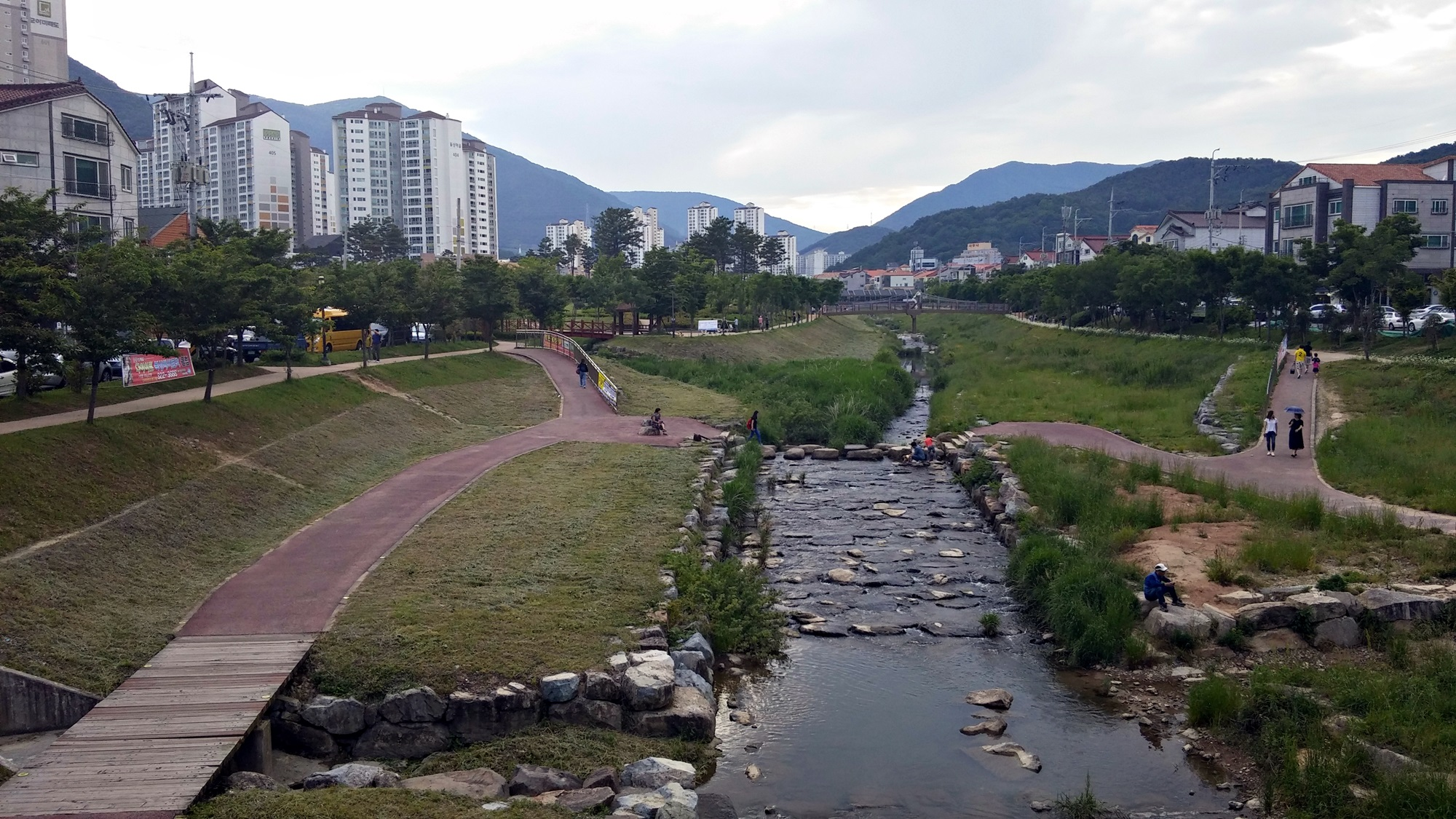
Yulha-cheon

Jangyu features the Yulha-cheon and Daecheong-cheon streams, both of which empty into the Joman-gang River. The Gimhae Municipal Government constructed the Jangyu "Walking Green Road" riverside path system linking Yulha-cheon, Daecheong-cheon, and Joman-gang. The shortest of the three available options spans 10.6 km, taking off from Joman-gang via Daecheong-cheon, passing close to Daecheong High School and Ballyongsan Park before looping into Yulha-cheon. A secondary path extends 12 km from Joman-gang up through Daecheong Valley, Baekryeonam Hermitage in Gwandong-dong, and Palpan Village before joining Yulha-cheon, while the longest variant stretches 13.5 km from the lower reaches of Daecheong Valley down to Yulha-cheon. While the Yulha-cheon paths are well-developed, citizens have filed complaints over excessive brightness from its night lighting arrays. The city faced some criticism for moving forward with the installation without consulting neighboring apartment complexes.

Beginning in 2021, Gimhae City has spearheaded an ecological restoration initiative for the Mugye Brook. The project targets two main segments spanning a combined length of 1.1 km: a 0.3 km stretch along Mugye 1-cheon near the Daecheong-cheon Bridge and a 0.8 km stretch along Mugye 2-cheon around Yongdusan Mountain. It was selected on October 7, 2020, during Gyeongsangnam-do's public bidding process for 2021 ecological stream restorations, allowing the municipality to secure 186 million KRW in national and provincial funds to launch basic and architectural design phases in January 2021.

=== Mountains ===
Ballyongsan Mountain rises at the center of Jangyu, surrounded to the west and south by a contiguous mountain system consisting of Yongjibong, Bulmosan, and Guramsan. Yongjibong Peak serves as an intersection where the Naknam Vein runs east-west and the Shin-naknam Vein branches north-south, giving it a reputation as a "pivotal peak of Gyeongsangnam-do's main mountain ranges." Yongjibong and Bulmosan delineate the geographic border between Changwon and Jangyu, sheltering the Daecheong Valley and the artificial Jangyu Waterfall between their ridges.

== Economy and Commerce ==
Commercial growth in Jangyu originally began around the 'Jangyu Central Market' in Mugye-dong—which started operating in 1960—alongside the commercial strip that formed around the intersection in front of the nearby Jangyu Nonghyup Bank branch. Initially running as a traditional five-day market opening on days ending in 3 and 8, the Jangyu Central Market transitioned to a permanent daily operation in 2012.

Large-scale shopping districts that emerged post-New Town development include neighborhood commercial strips represented by the Bugok-dong Core Shopping Center (officially 'Core Multi-Living Center'), the central commercial zone in Daecheong-dong, and neighborhood shopping sectors in Yulha-dong. Lotte Mart has been operating its Jangyu branch in Daecheong-dong since August 2004. However, due to the density of motels and nightlife establishments in these zones, neighborhood friction remains a point of local concern.

Around 2010, following residential expansions in Yulha New Town, the 'Yulha Cafe Street' took shape along the Yulha-cheon stream (administered legally under Gwandong-dong). This cafe district garnered media attention for hosting a storefront operated by the family of prominent actor Gang Dong-won.

Separately, Gyeongsangnam-do and the Lotte Shopping forged an agreement in 1996 to establish the 'Gimhae Tourism and Distribution Complex' in modern-day Sinmun-dong (then Sinmun-ri, Jangyu-myeon). Development faced structural delays due to revisions in planning, only gaining traction in late 2007. Amid these shifts, the Gimhae Agricultural and Marine Products Wholesale Market opened inside the complex in 2005, followed by the opening of Lotte Premium Outlets Gimhae in December 2008, drawing 30,000 visitors and recording 1.4 billion KRW in sales on its opening day. In March 2012, construction broke ground on the Gimhae Lotte Water Park, which opened to the public in May 2014.

== Education ==
Educational Institutions in Jangyu (As of April 1, 2019 / Unit: Institutions)
Classification	Jangyu 1-dong	Jangyu 2-dong	Jangyu 3-dong	Total
Kindergartens	7	7	13	27
Elementary schools	5	4	6	15
Middle schools	3	2	3	8
High schools	1	2	2	5

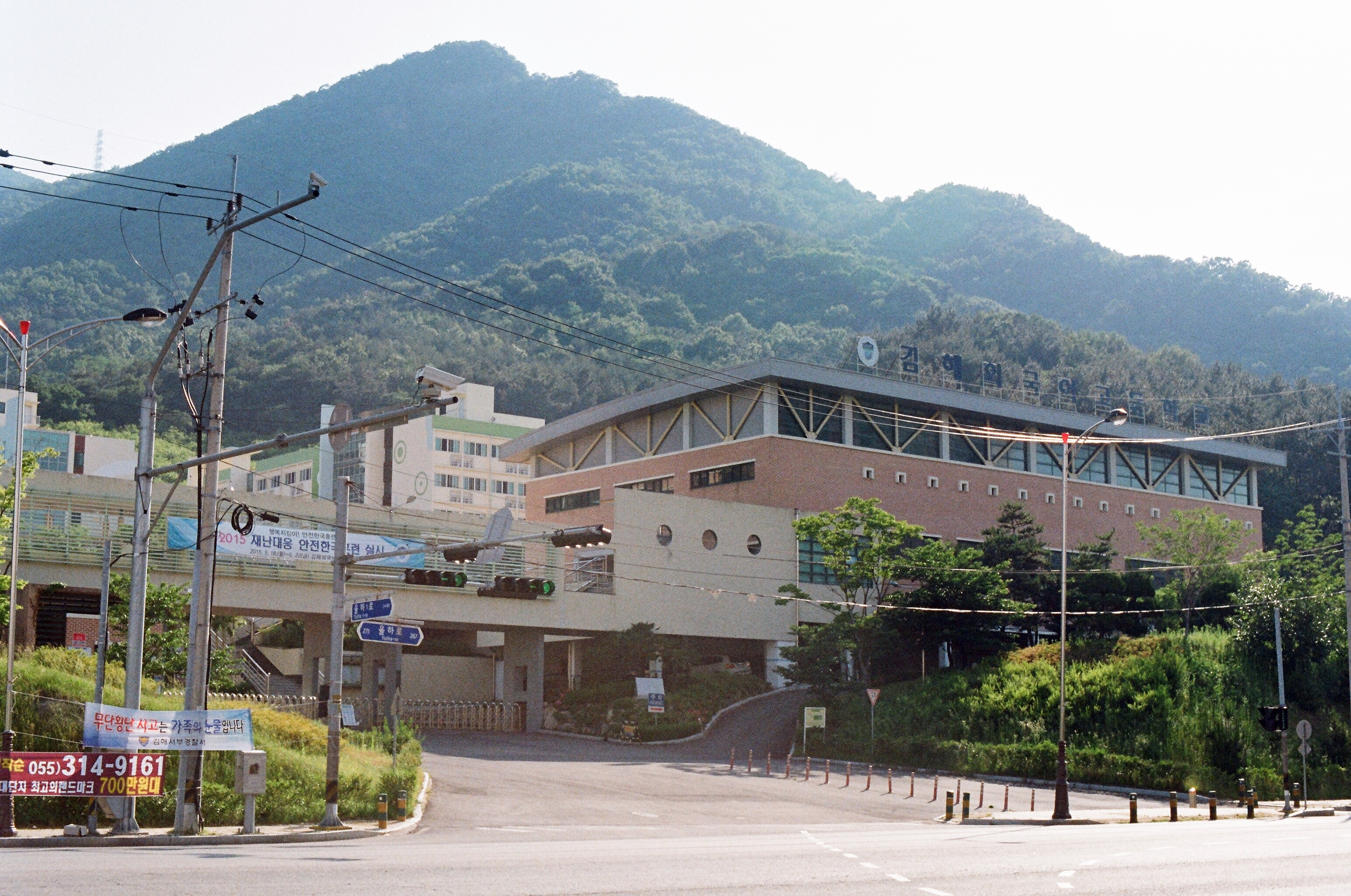
Main gate of Gimhae Foreign Language High School

As of April 1, 2019, the educational institutions in Jangyu include 27 kindergartens, 15 elementary schools, 8 middle schools, and 5 high schools. Initial municipal goals to build a private high school on the reserved educational plot next to Deokjeong Elementary School fell through due to a lack of private school foundations bidding on the site. Public kindergarten infrastructure originally consisted only of subsidiary preschools attached to newly built elementary schools, prompting long-standing parents' requests for expansions to address the shortage relative to the child population. The area's first standalone public preschool, 'Jangyu Kindergarten', launched in 2012; however, admissions remain highly competitive, with a November 2014 drawing showing 408 children applying for a mere 67 openings, intensifying local requests for more standalone public facilities.

In 2003, after Gimhae City offered school plots to the Gyeongsangnam-do Office of Education and volunteered to absorb municipal costs for building access roads and sewer plumbing, plans were locked in to build a public foreign language high school. This led to the launch of Gimhae Foreign Language High School, the area's primary specialized high school, in March 2006. In 2009, Gimhae Daecheong High School was selected under the boarding high school project by the Ministry of Education, Science and Technology, inaugurating its on-campus student dormitory in 2011.

== Population and Households ==
=== Jangyu-myeon Era ===
Population Trends (1990–2012)

Population Trend of Jangyu-myeon
1990	11,663
1995	11,638
2000	16,945
2001	20,821
2002	47,490
2003	55,838
2004	74,045
2005	85,319
2006	90,873
2007	97,199
2008	103,746
2009	118,792
2010	124,399
2011	127,933
2012	133,444

Household Trend of Jangyu-myeon
1990	3,119
1995	3,274
2000	5,119
2001	6,395
2002	15,272
2003	18,057
2004	23,863
2005	27,047
2006	28,823
2007	30,906
2008	33,076
2009	38,218
2010	39,877
2011	41,039
2012	43,411

Source: Statistics Korea (KOSIS) National Statistics Portal, Gimhae City Public Data Platform

=== Jangyu Branch Office Era ===
Population Trends (2013–2018)

Population Trend of Jangyu Branch Office
2013	141,633
2014	145,938
2015	146,377
2016	147,040
2017	151,081
2018	153,107

Household Trend of Jangyu Branch Office
2013	46,165
2014	48,167
2015	48,475
2016	44,143
2017	51,327
2018	52,736

Source: Gimhae City Public Data Platform

== Public Infrastructure ==
=== Branch Offices and Community Centers ===
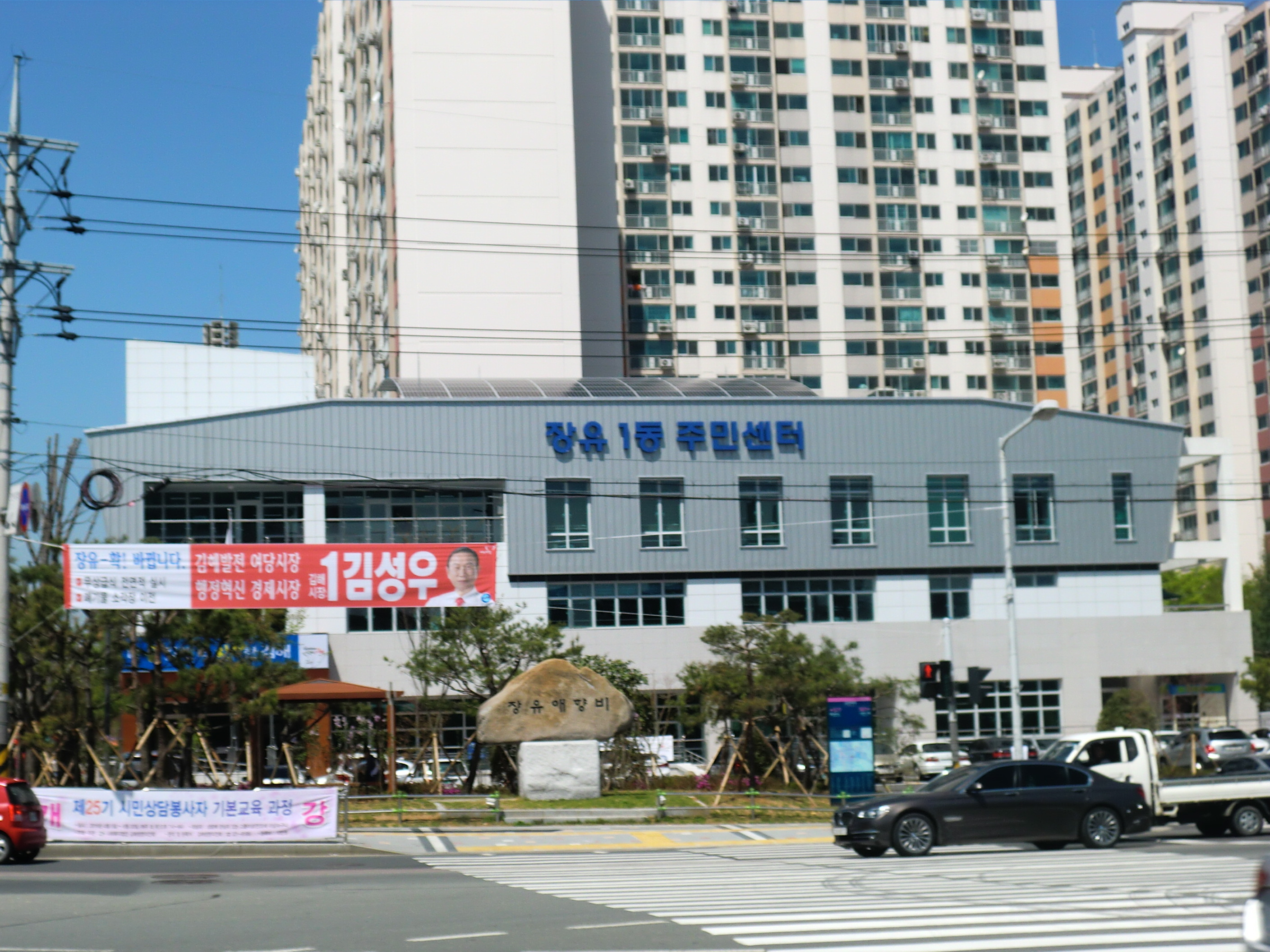
The newly built community center in 2015

In April 2005, reflecting local consensus to support residents who previously traveled directly to the central city hall for permits, Gimhae City secured approvals from the Ministry of Government Administration and Home Affairs to establish the Jangyu Branch Office inside the Jangyu Incineration Plant administrative block, launching localized public permit and code enforcement processing.

At the time of the official urban dong transition on July 1, 2013, Jangyu 2-dong inaugurated its operations inside a newly built facility completed that year. Conversely, Jangyu 1-dong utilized the historical myeon office building, and Jangyu 3-dong used the Yulha Relics Exhibition Hall as temporary office locations. Construction on the permanent Jangyu 3-dong Community Center concluded in April 2014, opening to the public on April 28; while opening ceremonies were deferred out of respect for the Sinking of MV Sewol tragedy, a formal opening event was eventually held on July 2, 2014, combined with the first anniversary of the area's conversion into urban dongs.

In December 2014, the city demolished the aging myeon building used by Jangyu 1-dong to build a modern replacement, which officially launched its public services in December 2015.

=== Public Safety and Policing ===
The 'Gimhae Seobu Police Station Jangyu District Office' handles long-term safety operations over the entire Jangyu jurisdiction. Tracing its lineage, military and civilian colonial gendarmerie outposts were first positioned in the area during the Japanese colonial era, which became the Jangyu Substation of the Gimhae Police Station on August 15, 1945. The outpost relocated into newly constructed buildings within Mugye-ri in 1968 and 1995, renamed the Southern District Office in August 2003, and reverted to the Jangyu District Office in September of that year. It moved into its current headquarters in Daecheong-dong in 2011.

Nevertheless, population growth has triggered recurring calls to establish additional precinct offices. During the 2011 municipal reorganization evaluations, the planned installation of distinct police stations or substations for each new dong was cited as an advantage of the administrative split. In 2013, an active inspector attached to the Seobu station published an op-ed piece via the Gyeongdomin Ilbo, emphasizing that precinct expansions would likely be delayed until at least 2017 and calling for active public interest from Jangyu residents. Media coverage from the Gyeongnam Shinmun in 2014 confirmed that the Gimhae Seobu Police Station had formally petitioned national headquarters to build a new Yulha District Office by 2015.

Meanwhile, institutional talks to found an independent secondary police department started in 2005, breaking ground in June 2007 on a site across from the Jangyu Cultural Center in Daecheong-dong. The branch opened its doors in December 2008. Following the opening of the Gimhae Seobu Police Station, the preexisting central headquarters was renamed the Gimhae Jungbu Police Station, and the Jangyu District Office was reassigned under Seobu control. Beyond the immediate Jangyu area, the Seobu command actively manages public safety across the western reaches of Gimhae, covering Chilsanseobu-dong, Jinyeong-eup, Hanlim-myeon, Juchon-myeon, and Jillye-myeon.

=== Fire and Rescue Services ===
Fire operations were originally anchored at a single installation: the 'Gimhae Fire Station Jangyu 119 Safety Center' in Daecheong-dong, which covered the entire region. Mirroring the complaints raised regarding police coverage, population increases drove demands for an independent departmental headquarters. Following the line-of-duty death of a firefighter attached to the Saengnim 119 Safety Center while combating a factory blaze in Saengnim-myeon, the Gyeongsangnam-do Fire Department announced plans to establish the Gimhae Seobu Fire Station.

In May 2015, the Gyeongsangnam-do Policy Planning Office announced via a press conference that the Gimhae Seobu Fire Station would govern 5 safety centers across 3 operational divisions, while the existing central station would be renamed the Gimhae Dongbu Fire Station. Two months later on July 2, the Seobu command officially launched, utilizing the Jangyu 119 Safety Center facility in Sammun-dong as its temporary department headquarters. The Seobu station's territory covers Jangyu along with Jinyeong-eup, Juchon-myeon, Jillye-myeon, and Hanlim-myeon.

With the subsequent population surge in Yulha New Town, the Yulha 119 Safety Center opened in January 2021 to handle emergency response across the Jangyu 3-dong administrative sector.

=== Energy and Utilities ===
A solid waste municipal incinerator (Jangyu Waste Incineration Plant) located in Bugok-dong along the northern side has been operating since June 2001. The facility incinerates waste gathered across the entirety of Gimhae, not just the local district. While no residential housing directly bordered the incinerator upon its completion, apartment complexes were built nearby within a year, initiating long-term public frictions. Public pushback demanded its closure and relocation prior to the completion of its 15-year operational lifespan approaching in 2016. During the June 4 local elections in 2014, then-Gimhae Mayor Kim Maeng-gon campaigned on an official pledge to shut down the plant by late 2016; however, the promise went unfulfilled, relocation talks were tabled, and the plant remained operational after structural safety assessments concluded it could run safely until 2021.

Adjacent to the incinerator, the Korea District Heating Corporation completed a major facility in November 2001, providing central district heating infrastructure across almost the entirety of the Jangyu New Town developments.

== Cultural and Leisure Facilities ==
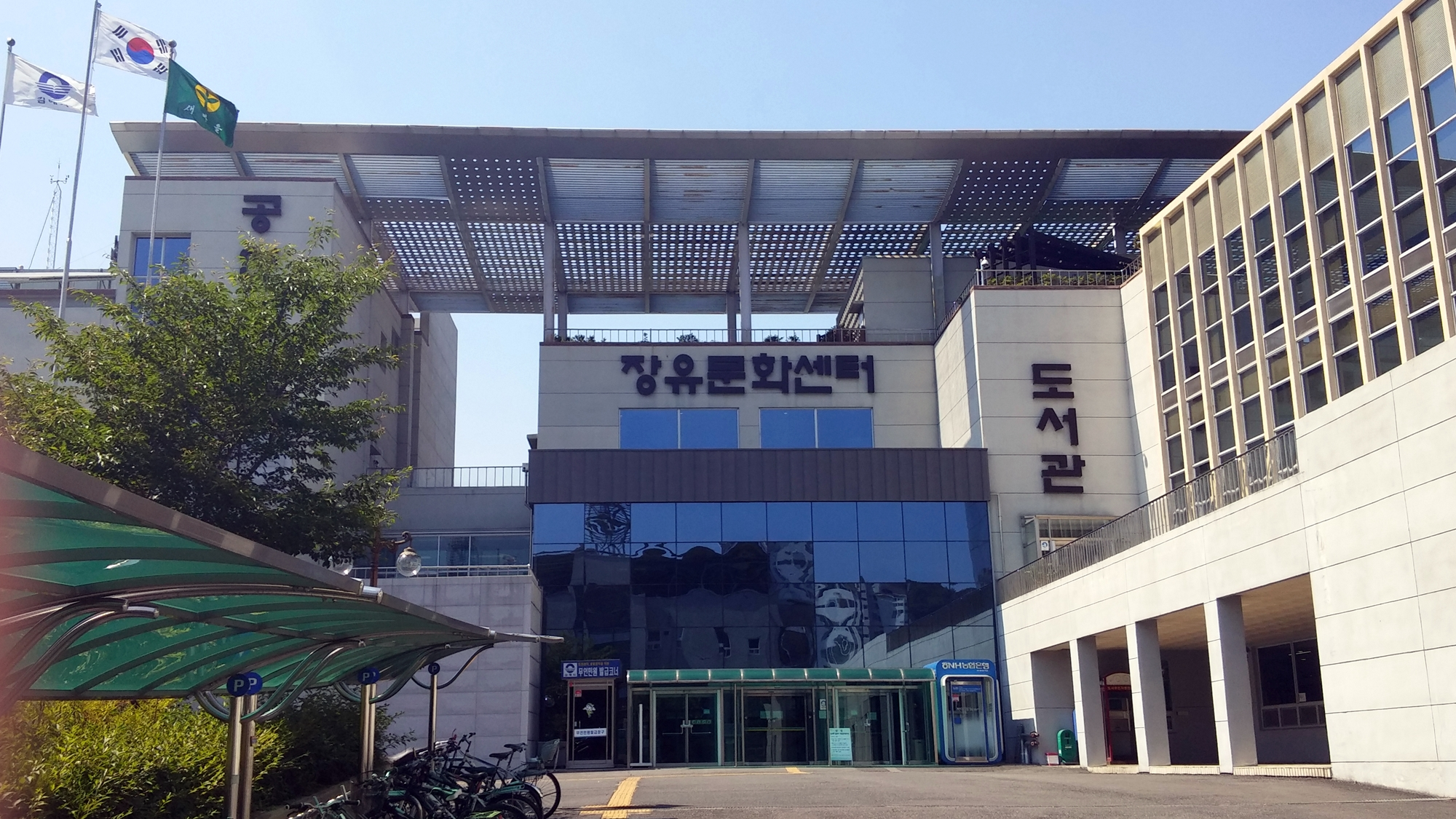
Jangyu Cultural Center

There are three public libraries operating in the region. The Jangyu Cultural Center, equipped with a library and a performance hall, opened in Daecheong-dong in 2002. Additionally, the Gimhae Miracle Library, a specialized children's library, opened in Yulha-dong in 2011, followed by the launch of the Gimhae Seobu Culture Center in 2018.

For sports parks, the 'Jangyu Sports Center', featuring an indoor swimming pool and gymnasium facilities, opened in Sammun-dong in 2004. The 'Jangyu Sports Park', equipped with an artificial turf field and other amenities, opened in Bugok-dong in 2005. In 2013, an artificial multipurpose field was installed in front of the Jangyu Sports Center and has since been operating under the name 'Jelmi Multipurpose Field'. In Gwandong-dong, the Yulha Sports Park and Yulha Gymnasium were established, with the gymnasium entering official operations in May 2015.

Meanwhile, with the goal of turning Ballyongsan Mountain, located in the heart of the city, into a leisure and relaxation space, the Gimhae Municipal Government launched a project in 2006 to develop parks divided into five distinct districts: Chunhwagok, Daecheong, Sinmun, Juklim, and Sammun. However, unlike the original goal of completion by 2008, the project faced delays due to budget shortages, resulting in only the Chunhwagok District being completed in 2011. In 2010, the city formulated a plan to build a wood culture experiential facility within the park, which officially opened in November 2015. Separately, there had been a blueprint since 1997 to develop a sports park on Yongduan Mountain, spanning across Mugye-dong and Naedeok-dong, under the tentative name 'Yongdu Sports Park'. However, due to a lack of participation from private enterprises in the early 2000s, the project was ultimately scrapped.

== See Also ==
- Jangyu-dong
