= Jangyu =

Jangyu (Korean: 장유) can refer to:

- Jangyu, Gimhae a general area in Gimhae, South Korea
- Jangyu-dong an administrative district in Gimhae, which is also part of the Jangyu area
