= Jangyu-dong =

Coordinates: 34°59′N 126°45′E

- Neighbourhood
- Interactive map of Jangyu-dong
- Country: South Korea
- Province: South Gyeongsang Province
- City: Gimhae
- Divisions: 3 haejeongdong, 12 beopjeongdong

Area
  - Total: 54.6 km^{2} (21.1 sq mi)

Population
  - Total: 123,867
  - Density: 2,270/km^{2} (5,880/sq mi)

Korean name
- Hangul: 장유동
- Hanja: 長有洞
- RR: Jangyu-dong
- MR: Changyu-dong

Jangyu-dong (Korean: 장유동) is a dong in Gimhae, South Gyeongsang Province, South Korea. On July 1, 2013, Jangyu-myeon was upgraded to a dong. It is the site of the new city of Jangyu. It is located in the historical Nakdong River valley of southern Korea, where part of the Gaya confederacy was once located before being absorbed into Silla, one of the Three Kingdoms of Korea.

Rapid development in this area in the form of housing construction began in the early 2000s in order to take pressure off the neighboring cities of northern Gimhae and Changwon, the provincial capital. Gimhae Foreign Language High School is located in the area. Because of the rapid development, a lot of money has been focused into expanding the cities population. There is an Outlet in the city that is run by the Lotte Corporation, as well as a newly opened water park known as Gimhae Lotte Water Park (김해롯데워터파크) that opened in the Summer of 2014. The water park is the largest in Korea.

Among residents in surrounding areas, Jangyu is known for its increasingly popular cafe district, and Jangyu Water Fall, a man-made waterfall.

== See also ==
- Geography of South Korea
- List of cities in South Korea
