= Hadan station =

Hadan station (Korean: 하단역) may refer to:

- Hadan station (Busan Metro), in Busan, South Korea
- Hadan station (Pyongui Line), in Chŏngju, North Korea
