= Gimhae Foreign Language High School =

Coordinates: 35°10′15″N 128°48′19″E

- 김해외국어고등학교 / 金海外國語高等學校
- Gimhae, Gyeongnam; South Korea

Information
- Type: Public, Boarding school
- Motto: 세계적 지도자의 꿈을 키운다 (Cultivating Global Leaders' Dreams!)
- Established: 2006
- Principal: Kim Young-chul (김영철)
- Faculty: 46
- Grades: 10-12
- Enrollment: 450

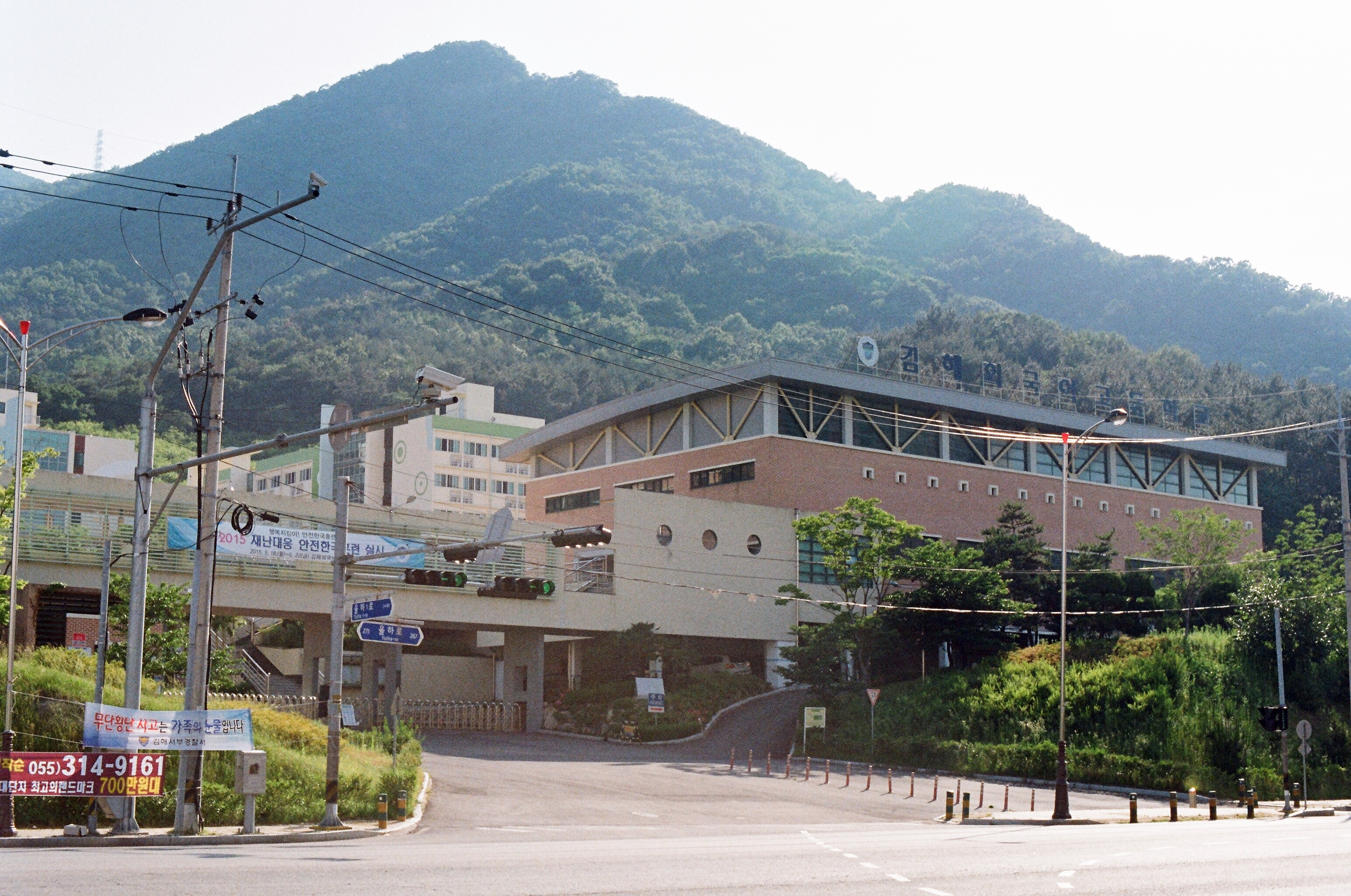
Gimhae Foreign Language High School

Gimhae Foreign Language High School (GIMFL; Korean: 김해외국어고등학교; Hanja: 金海外國語高等學校) is a public, coeducational, college preparatory high school founded in 2006 with the stated aim of "helping students achieve their dreams in becoming future global leaders". It is the only public foreign language school in South Gyeongsang Province province, South Korea, and was co-founded by the Office of Gyeongnam Education and Gimhae city. The school sits at the foot of a flora covered hillside. It is located in the new town of Jangyu, which belongs to Gimhae city and is only a short distance from Busan, and Changwon.

Each summer the Office of Gyeongnam Education and Gimhae city fund full scholarships for special activities such as touring the Ivy League universities of the United States.

Like most schools in Korea, GIMFL's school year begins in March, the second semester begins in September, and graduation takes place in February.

== Admissions ==
Students can gain admission to GIMFL by demonstrating ability in a variety of areas, although the most common way students are accepted is through passing GIMFL's own admissions exams, which include an English test and a brief interview. GIMFL applicants are generally in the top 4% of their middle schools. All GIMFL students are selected on their merit, with approximately a 6:1 placement ratio.

== Faculty ==
GIMFL's faculty is composed of teachers selectively screened from other public schools within Gyeongnam Province, 5 of which [of whom] hold a PhD. degree, 10 who hold a master's degree, and 4 who have studied abroad in the United States, Canada, or England.

The school also employs native speaking, professional teachers for the non-Korean languages.

== Academics ==
Students study core courses such as mathematics, science, history, and the arts, as well as intensive language study of Korean, English, Japanese, and Chinese.

== Extracurricular activities ==
Students have a wide variety of extracurricular activities to choose from including the Model United Nations club of GIMFL known as GMUN, debate club, music courses such as band and orchestra, theater club, the Global Leaders Program, SAT classes led by native English speakers, and mountain hikes.
