= Bonghwang station =

Station of the Busan Metro

16 봉황 (김해여객터미널) Bonghwang (Gimhae Passenger Terminal)
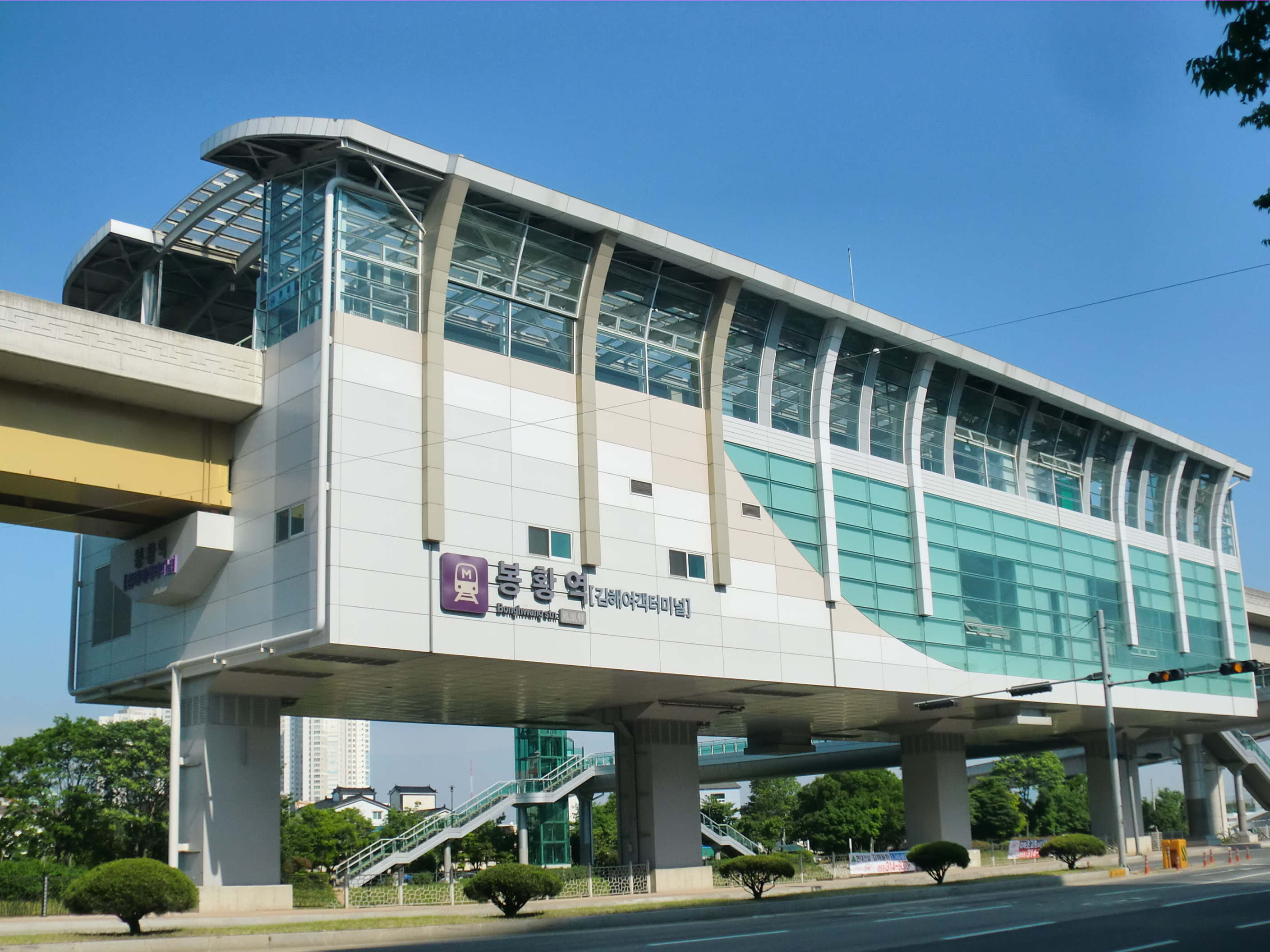

Korean name
- Hangul: 봉황역
- Hanja: 鳳凰驛
- Revised Romanization: Bonghwang-yeok
- McCune–Reischauer: Ponghwang-yŏk

General information
- Location: Jeonha-dong, Gimhae; South Korea
- Coordinates: 35.2274°N 128.8742°E
- Operator: Busan–Gimhae Light Rail Transit Operation Corporation
- Line: Busan–Gimhae Light Rail Transit
- Platforms: 2
- Tracks: 2

Construction
- Structure type: Aboveground

Other information
- Station code: 16

History
- Opened: September 16, 2011

Services
Preceding station	Busan Metro	Following station
Buwon towards Sasang	Busan–Gimhae Light Rail Transit	Royal Tomb of King Suro towards Kaya University
Location

Bonghwang Station (Korean: 봉황역) is a station of the BGLRT Line of Busan Metro in Jeonha-dong, Gimhae, South Korea. The station is located at the riverside.

== Station Layout ==
L2; Platforms	Side platform, doors will open on the right
L2; Platforms	Southbound	← Busan–Gimhae LRT toward Sasang (Buwon)
L2; Platforms	Northbound	Busan–Gimhae LRT toward Kaya University (Royal Tomb of King Suro) →
L2; Platforms	Side platform, doors will open on the right
L1	Concourse	Faregates, Shops, Vending machines, ATMs
G	Street Level	Exits

== Exits ==
Exit No.	Image	Destinations
1		Miryang Pork Soup; Gimhae Bus Terminal
2		
