= Royal Tomb of King Suro station =

Station of the Busan Metro

17 수로왕릉 (김해보건소) Royal Tomb of King Suro (Gimhae Health Center)
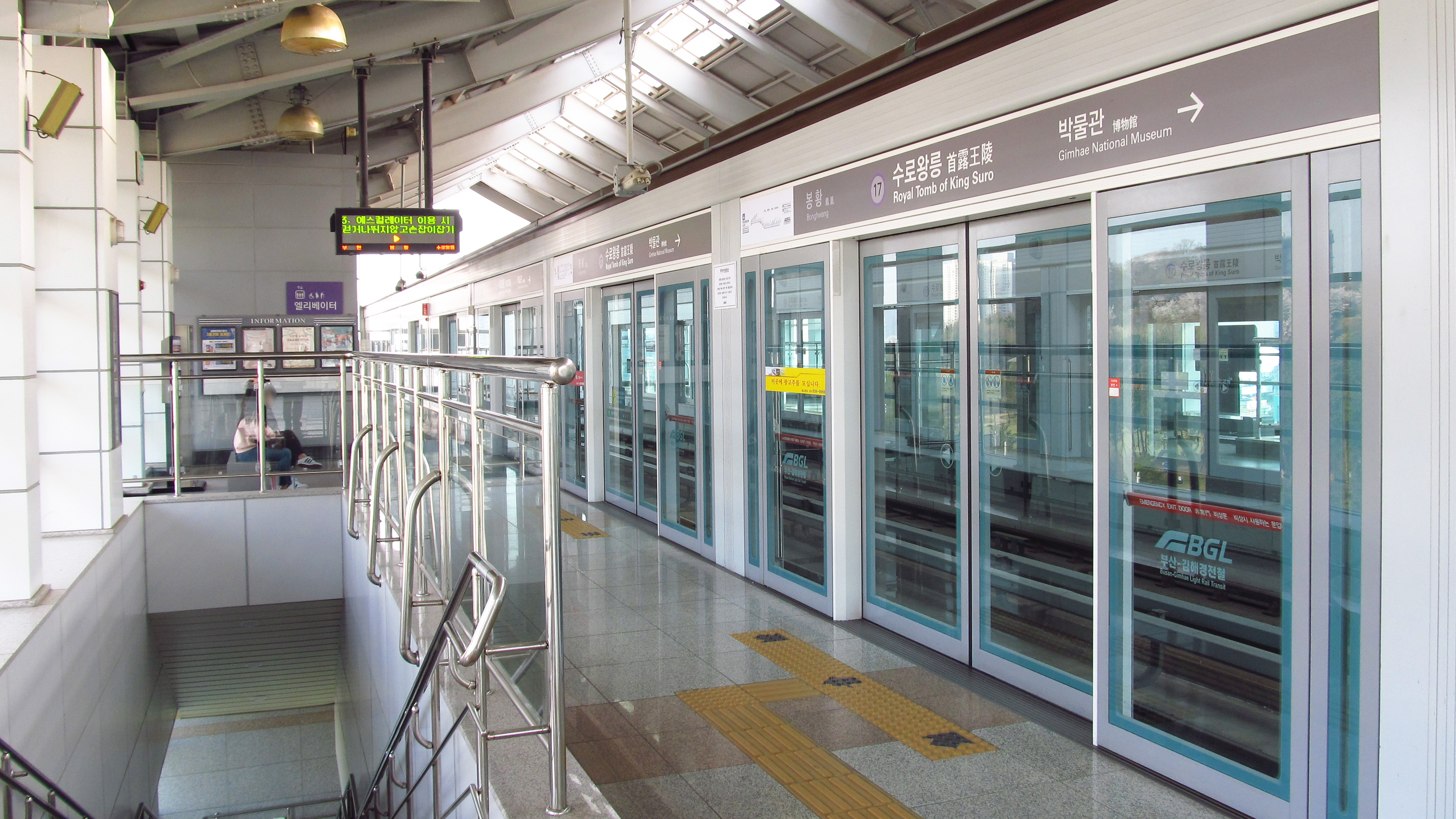

Korean name
- Hangul: 수로왕릉역
- Hanja: 首露王陵驛
- Revised Romanization: Surowangreung yeok
- McCune–Reischauer: Surowangrŭng yŏk

General information
- Location: Oe-dong, Gimhae; South Korea
- Coordinates: 35.2329°N 128.8720°E
- Operator: Busan–Gimhae Light Rail Transit Operation Corporation
- Line: Busan–Gimhae Light Rail Transit
- Platforms: 2
- Tracks: 2

Construction
- Structure type: Aboveground

Other information
- Station code: 17

History
- Opened: September 16, 2011

Services
Preceding station	Busan Metro	Following station
Bonghwang towards Sasang	Busan–Gimhae Light Rail Transit	Gimhae National Museum towards Kaya University
Location

Royal Tomb of King Suro Station (Korean: 수로왕릉역; Hanja: 首露王陵驛) is a station of the BGLRT Line of Busan Metro in Oe-dong, Gimhae, South Korea.

== Station name ==
The station subname is formerly known as Gimhae Terminal, where the station was near at the Gimhae Bus Terminal. During the construction of the Gimhae Health Center where the station is nearby, the station subname was renamed into Gimhae Health Center.

== Station Layout ==
L2; Platforms	Side platform, doors will open on the right
L2; Platforms	Southbound	← Busan–Gimhae LRT toward Sasang (Bonghwang)
L2; Platforms	Northbound	Busan–Gimhae LRT toward Kaya University (Gimhae National Museum) →
L2; Platforms	Side platform, doors will open on the right
L1	Concourse	Faregates, Shops, Vending machines, ATMs
G	Street Level	Exits

== Exits ==
Exit No.	Image	Destinations
1		Gimhae City Social Welfare Center
2		Jalan Kaki Dari King Suro Station
