= Gimhae International Airport station =

Station of the Busan Metro

Coordinates: 35.1720°N 128.9490°E

4 공항 Gimhae Int'l Airport
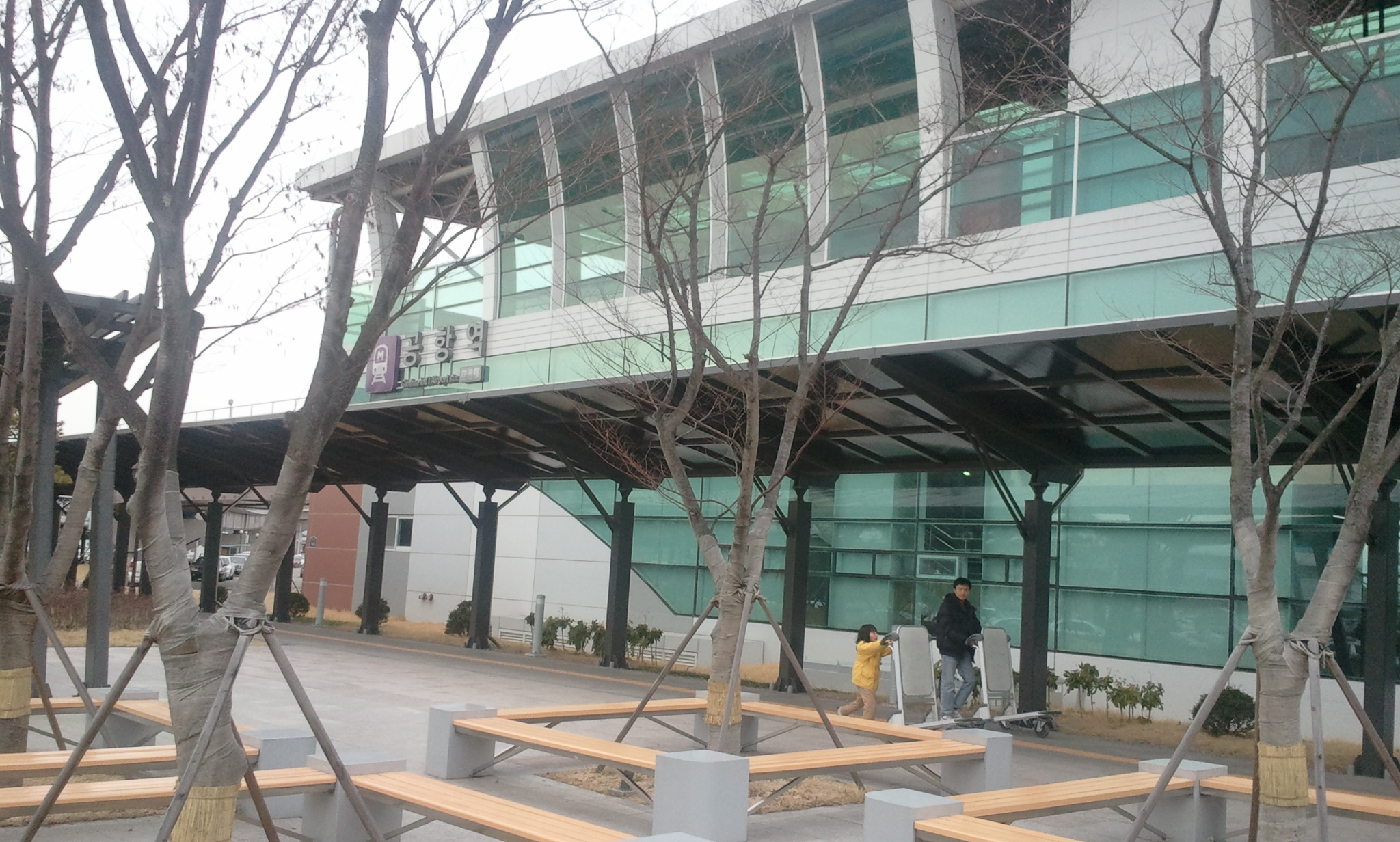

Korean name
- Hangul: 공항역
- Hanja: 空港驛
- Revised Romanization: Gonghang-yeok
- McCune–Reischauer: Konghang-yŏk

General information
- Location: Daejeo-dong, Gangseo District, Busan; South Korea
- Operator: Busan–Gimhae Light Rail Transit Operation Corporation
- Line: BGLRT Line
- Platforms: 2
- Tracks: 2

Construction
- Structure type: Aboveground

Other information
- Station code: 4

History
- Opened: September 16, 2011

Services
Preceding station	Busan Metro	Following station
Seobusan Yutongjigu towards Sasang	Busan–Gimhae Light Rail Transit	Deokdu towards Kaya University
Location

Gimhae International Airport Station (Korean: 공항역; Hanja: 空港驛) is a station of the BGLRT Line of Busan Metro in Daejeo-dong, Gangseo District, Busan, South Korea.

BGLRT connects Gimhae and Busan International Airport with two western outreaches of the Busan Metro system. Gimhae International Airport Station thus as the name implies acts as the embarkation/disembarkation point for rail passengers for Busan International Airport near Gimhae. BGLRT connects with other lines in the Busan Metro at Daejeo (Metro Line 3) and Sasang (Metro Line 2).

== Station Layout ==
L2; Platforms	Side platform, doors will open on the right
L2; Platforms	Southbound	← Busan–Gimhae LRT toward Sasang (Seobusan Yutongjigu)
L2; Platforms	Northbound	Busan–Gimhae LRT toward Kaya University (Deokdu) →
L2; Platforms	Side platform, doors will open on the right

L1; Concourse	Faregates, Shops, Vending machines, ATMs

G	Street level

== See also ==
- Gimhae International Airport
