= Deokdu station =

Metro station in Busan, South Korea

5 덕두 Deokdu
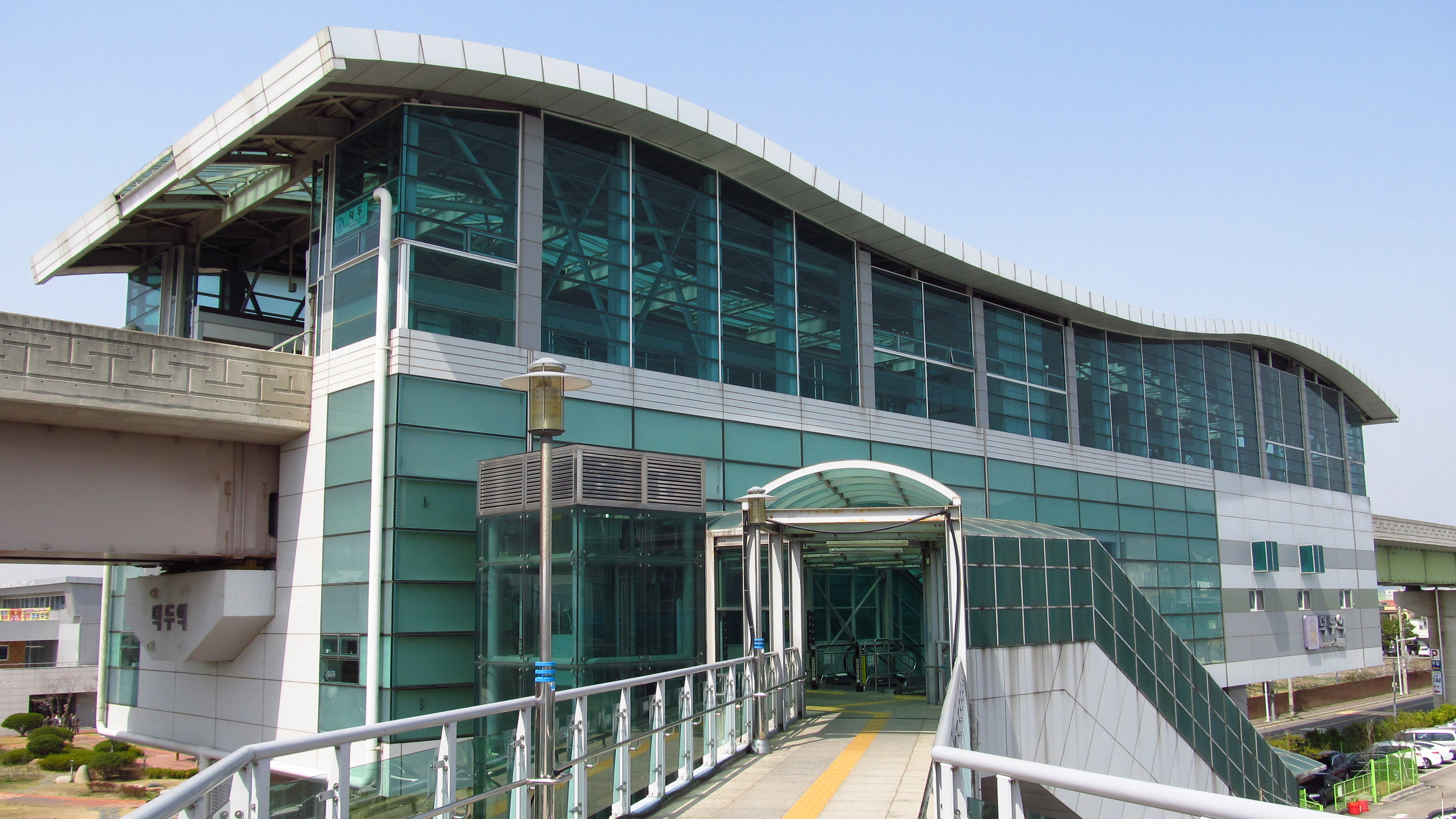

Korean name
- Hangul: 덕두역
- Hanja: 德斗驛
- Revised Romanization: Deokdu-yeok
- McCune–Reischauer: Tŏktu-yŏk

General information
- Location: Daejeo-dong, Gangseo District, Busan; South Korea
- Coordinates: 35°10′55″N 128°57′15″E
- Operator: Busan–Gimhae Light Rail Transit Operation Corporation
- Line: Busan–Gimhae Light Rail Transit
- Platforms: 2
- Tracks: 2

Construction
- Structure type: Aboveground

Other information
- Station code: 5

History
- Opened: September 16, 2011

Services
Preceding station	Busan Metro	Following station
Gimhae International Airport towards Sasang	Busan–Gimhae Light Rail Transit	Deunggu towards Kaya University
Location

Deokdu Station (Korean: 덕두역) is a station of the BGLRT Line of Busan Metro in Daejeo-dong, Gangseo District, Busan, South Korea.

== Station Layout ==
L2; Platforms	Side platform, doors will open on the right
L2; Platforms	Southbound	← Busan–Gimhae LRT toward Sasang (Gimhae International Airport)
L2; Platforms	Northbound	Busan–Gimhae LRT toward Kaya University (Deunggu) →
L2; Platforms	Side platform, doors will open on the right

L1; Concourse	Faregates, Shops, Vending machines, ATMs

G	Street level

== Vicinity ==
- Exit 1: Bogwangsa
- Exit 2: Busan Gangseo Police Station Airport Police Box
