= Gimhae National Museum station =

Station of the Busan Metro

18 박물관 Gimhae National Museum
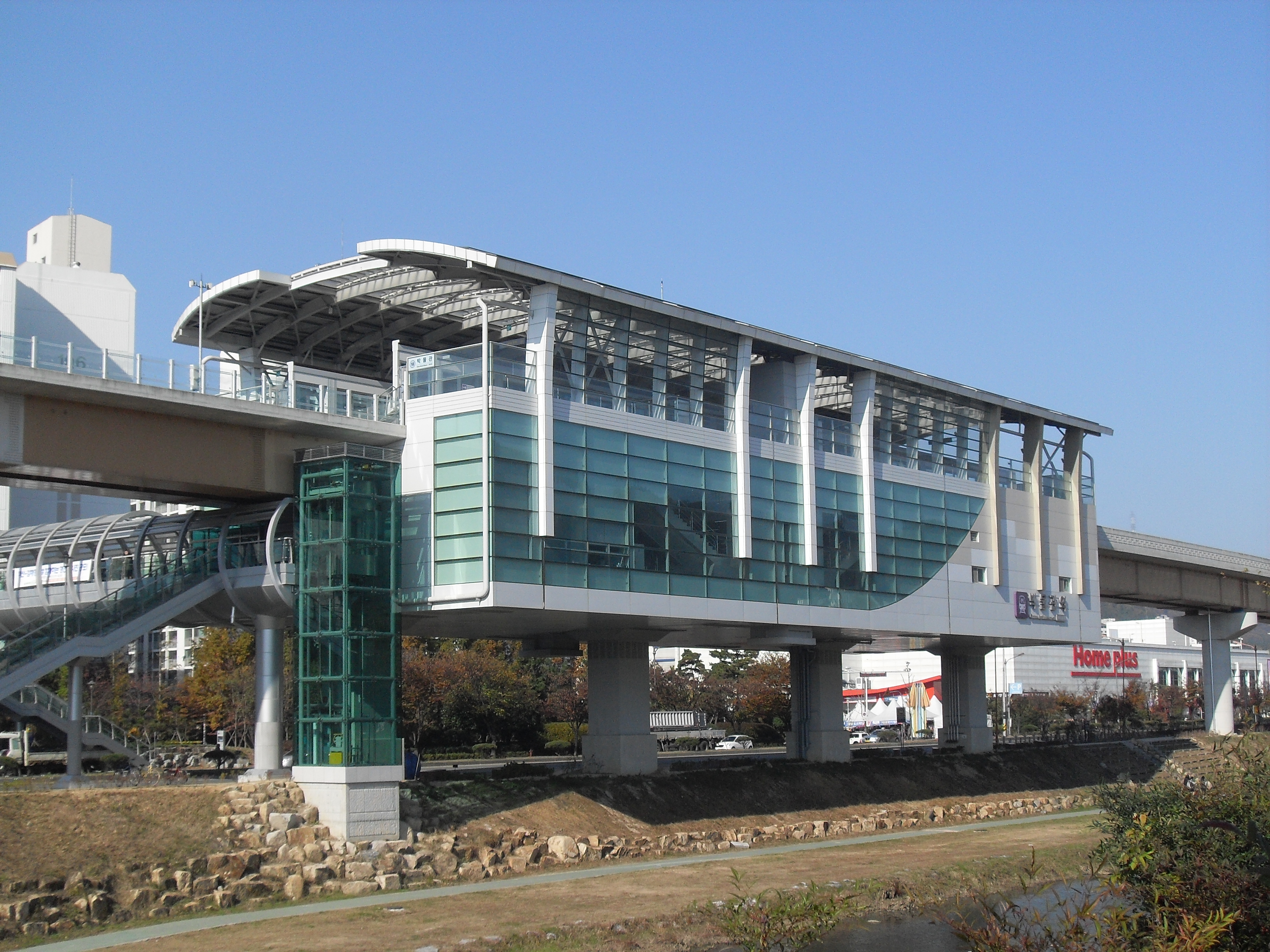

Korean name
- Hangul: 박물관역
- Hanja: 博物館驛
- Revised Romanization: Bakmulgwan-yeok
- McCune–Reischauer: Pakmulgwan-yŏk

General information
- Location: Nae-dong, Gimhae; South Korea
- Coordinates: 35.2402°N 128.8718°E
- Operator: Busan–Gimhae Light Rail Transit Operation Corporation
- Line: Busan–Gimhae Light Rail Transit
- Platforms: 2
- Tracks: 2

Construction
- Structure type: Aboveground

Other information
- Station code: 18

History
- Opened: September 16, 2011

Services
Preceding station	Busan Metro	Following station
Royal Tomb of King Suro towards Sasang	Busan–Gimhae Light Rail Transit	Yeonji Park towards Kaya University
Location

Gimhae National Museum Station (Korean: 박물관역) is a station of the BGLRT Line of Busan Metro in Nae-dong, Gimhae, South Korea.

== Station Layout ==
L2; Platforms	Side platform, doors will open on the right
L2; Platforms	Southbound	← Busan–Gimhae LRT toward Sasang (Royal Tomb of King Suro)
L2; Platforms	Northbound	Busan–Gimhae LRT toward Kaya University (Yeonji Park) →
L2; Platforms	Side platform, doors will open on the right
L1	Concourse	Faregates, Shops, Vending machines, ATMs
G	Street Level	Exits

== Exits ==
Exit No.	Image	Destinations
1		Hyundai 1st APT
2		Bus Stop
