= Yeonji Park station =

Station of the Busan Metro

19 연지공원 Yeonji Park
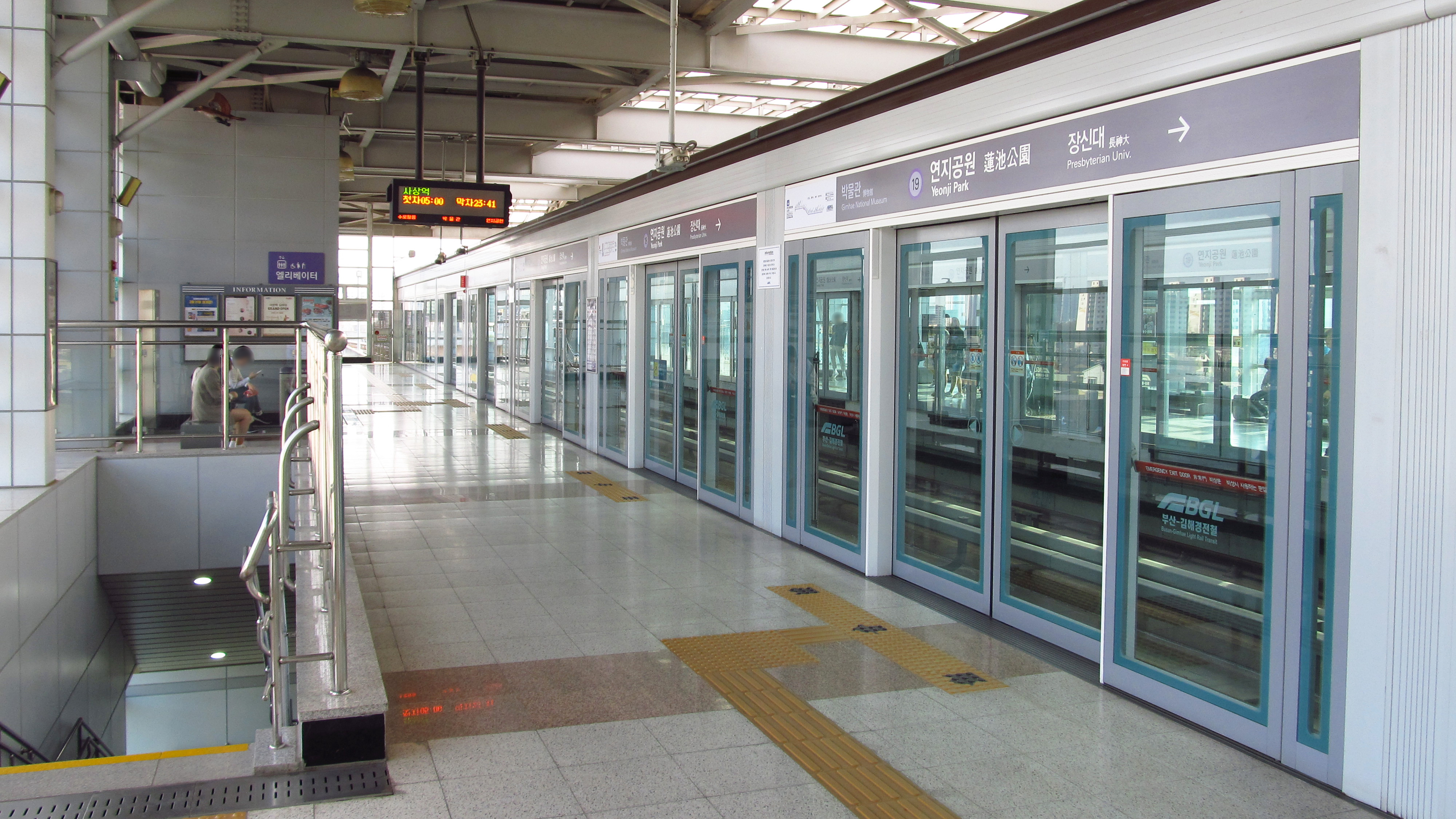

Korean name
- Hangul: 연지공원역
- Hanja: 蓮池公園驛
- Revised Romanization: Yeonji gongwon yeok
- McCune–Reischauer: Yŏnji kongwŏn yŏk

General information
- Location: Gusan-dong]], Gimhae; South Korea
- Coordinates: 35.2497°N 128.8692°E
- Operator: Busan–Gimhae Light Rail Transit Operation Corporation
- Line: Busan–Gimhae Light Rail Transit
- Platforms: 2
- Tracks: 2

Construction
- Structure type: Aboveground

Other information
- Station code: 19

History
- Opened: September 16, 2011

Services
Preceding station	Busan Metro	Following station
Gimhae National Museum towards Sasang	Busan–Gimhae Light Rail Transit	Presbyterian University towards Kaya University
Location

Yeonji Park Station (Korean: 연지공원역; Hanja: 蓮池公園驛) is a station of the BGLRT Line of Busan Metro in Gusan-dong, Gimhae, South Korea. The station name comes from Yeonji Park where the station is nearby.

== Station Layout ==
L2; Platforms	Side platform, doors will open on the right
L2; Platforms	Southbound	← Busan–Gimhae LRT toward Sasang (Gimhae National Museum)
L2; Platforms	Northbound	Busan–Gimhae LRT toward Kaya University (Presbyterian University) →
L2; Platforms	Side platform, doors will open on the right
L1	Concourse	Faregates, Shops, Vending machines, ATMs
G	Street Level	Exits

== Exits ==
Exit No.	Image	Destinations
1		Samcheonri Bicycle Gusan; Goldeunbug
2		Keopiyam; Korean BBQ
