= Presbyterian University station =

Station of the Busan Metro

20 장신대 (화정·강일병원) Presbyterian Univ. (Hwajeong·Kangil Hospital)
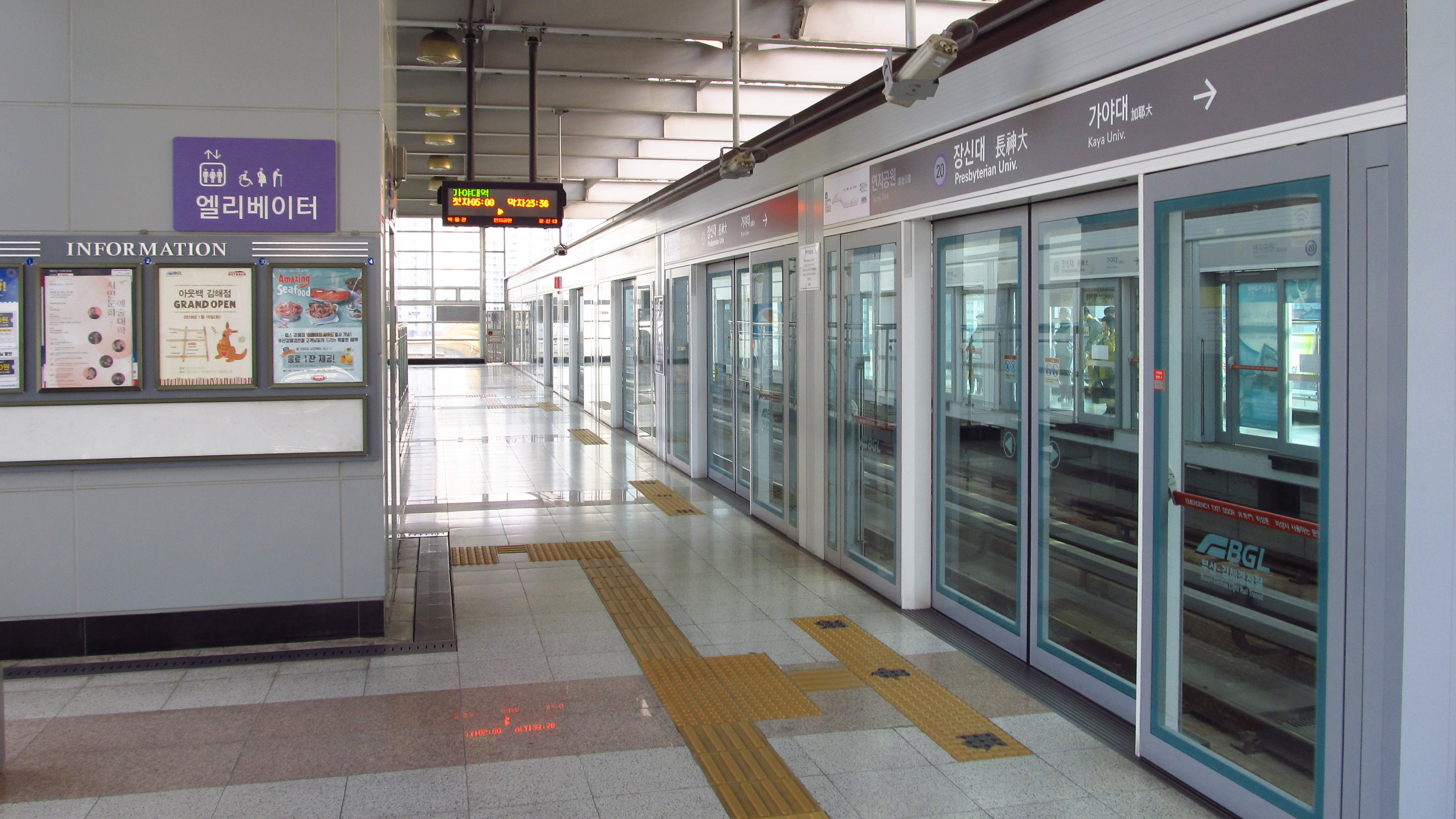

Korean name
- Hangul: 장신대역
- Hanja: 長神大驛
- Revised Romanization: Jangsindae yeok
- McCune–Reischauer: Changsintae yŏk

General information
- Location: Samgye-dong, Gimhae; South Korea
- Coordinates: 35.2596°N 128.8671°E
- Operator: Busan–Gimhae Light Rail Transit Operation Corporation
- Line: Busan–Gimhae Light Rail Transit
- Platforms: 2
- Tracks: 2

Construction
- Structure type: Aboveground

Other information
- Station code: 20

History
- Opened: September 16, 2011

Services
Preceding station	Busan Metro	Following station
Yeonji Park towards Sasang	Busan–Gimhae Light Rail Transit	Kaya University Terminus
Location

Presbyterian Univ. Station (Korean: 장신대역; Hanja: 長神大驛) is a station of the BGLRT Line of Busan Metro in Samgye-dong, Gimhae, South Korea. The station name comes from Busan Presbyterian University located at 900 meters from this station. At this station, there are no direct city bus routes.

== Station Layout ==
L2; Platforms	Side platform, doors will open on the right
L2; Platforms	Southbound	← Busan–Gimhae LRT toward Sasang (Yeonji Park)
L2; Platforms	Northbound	Busan–Gimhae LRT toward Kaya University (Terminus) →
L2; Platforms	Side platform, doors will open on the right
L1	Concourse	Faregates, Shops, Vending machines, ATMs
G	Street Level	Exits

== Exits ==
Exit No.	Image	Destinations
1		Won Grandmother Bossam Gimhae North Branch; Top Mart Samgye
2		KF Gimhae Samgye; Grilled duck restaurant
