= Kaya University station =

Station of the Busan Metro

21 가야대 (삼계) Kaya Univ. (Samgye)
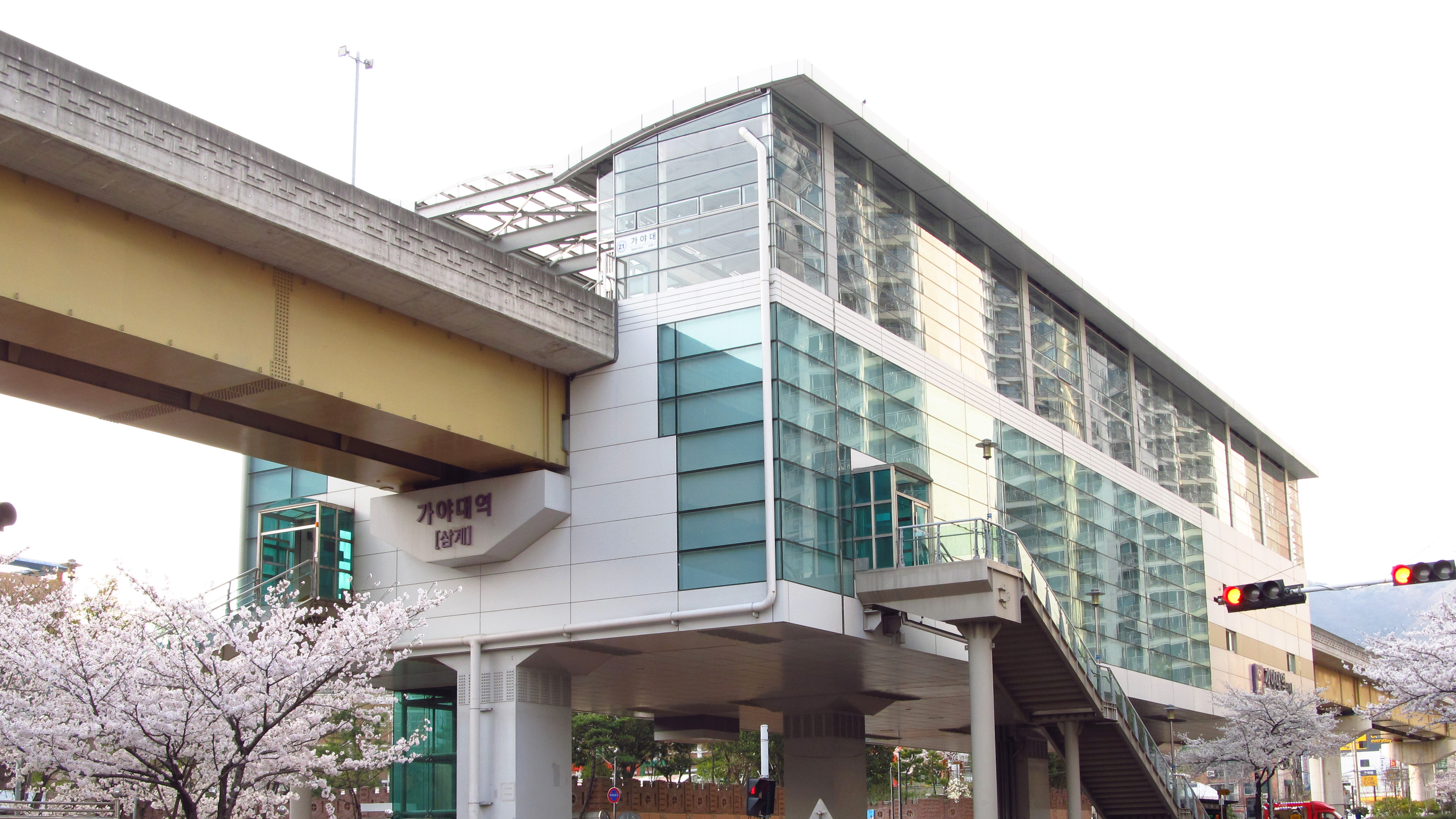

Korean name
- Hangul: 가야대역
- Hanja: 加耶大驛
- Revised Romanization: Gayadaeyeok
- McCune–Reischauer: Kayataeyŏk

General information
- Location: Samgye-dong, Gimhae, South Gyeongsang; South Korea
- Coordinates: 35.16237°N 128.98597°E
- Operator: Busan–Gimhae Light Rail Transit Operation Corporation
- Line: Busan–Gimhae Light Rail Transit
- Platforms: 2
- Tracks: 2

Construction
- Structure type: Aboveground
- Accessible: Yes

Other information
- Station code: 21

History
- Opened: September 16, 2011
- Former names: Sinmyeong Station (before opening)

Services
Preceding station	Busan Metro	Following station
Presbyterian University towards Sasang	Busan–Gimhae Light Rail Transit	Terminus
Location

Kaya University Station is a station of the BGLRT Line of Busan Metro located in Samgye-dong, Gimhae, South Gyeongsang. The station is the northern terminus of the BGLRT Line. The subname in parentheses is Samgye.

== Features ==
Before the opening, the station name was Shinmyeong Station, and at the beginning of the opening, the Gimhae City Hall tried to change the station name to Samgye Station and Gaya University Entrance, but it was abandoned. In the beginning, the location of Gaya University was going to be located at the point where Gaya-ro and Haebancheon-ro meet, that is, across the street from Shinmyeong Elementary School and Dongwon Apt. As a result, the apartments in Buyeong Complex 2 and Hwajeong Village Apartment Complex became close to each other, and the apartment complex 5 and Prugio Apartment Complex and Ian Apartment Complex became farther away. It can be seen by looking at the distance between stations that the reverse position change seems to be anomalous. For example, the distance between Gimhae National Museum station and Yeonji Park station is about 1100m, and the distance between Yeonji Park Station and Presbyterian University Station is about 1200m, while the distance between Presbyterian University and Kaya University station has been reduced from 1150m, originally planned to 850m. In addition, because of the circulation line of the vehicle base, if it is not a stationary train in Sasang station, the next day's trains will change and operate.

== Station Layout ==
L2; Platforms	Side platform, doors will open on the right
L2; Platforms	Southbound	← Busan–Gimhae LRT toward Sasang (Presbyterian University)
L2; Platforms	Northbound	Busan–Gimhae LRT Alighting Passengers Only →
L2; Platforms	Side platform, doors will open on the right
L1	Concourse	Faregates, Shops, Vending machines, ATMs
G	Street Level	Exits

== Exits ==
Exit No.	Image	Destinations
1		Takoyaki restaurant
2		Buseong Village Complex 2 Northern Buyeong 7th Apartment
